= History of Madurai =

History of the Indian city

Madurai is a major tier II city in the state of Tamil Nadu, India. It is the administrative headquarters of the Madurai District and is a Hindu pilgrimage centre. The recorded history of Madurai extends to about 2000 years, and in that time, it has become a major economic, religious and cultural centre.

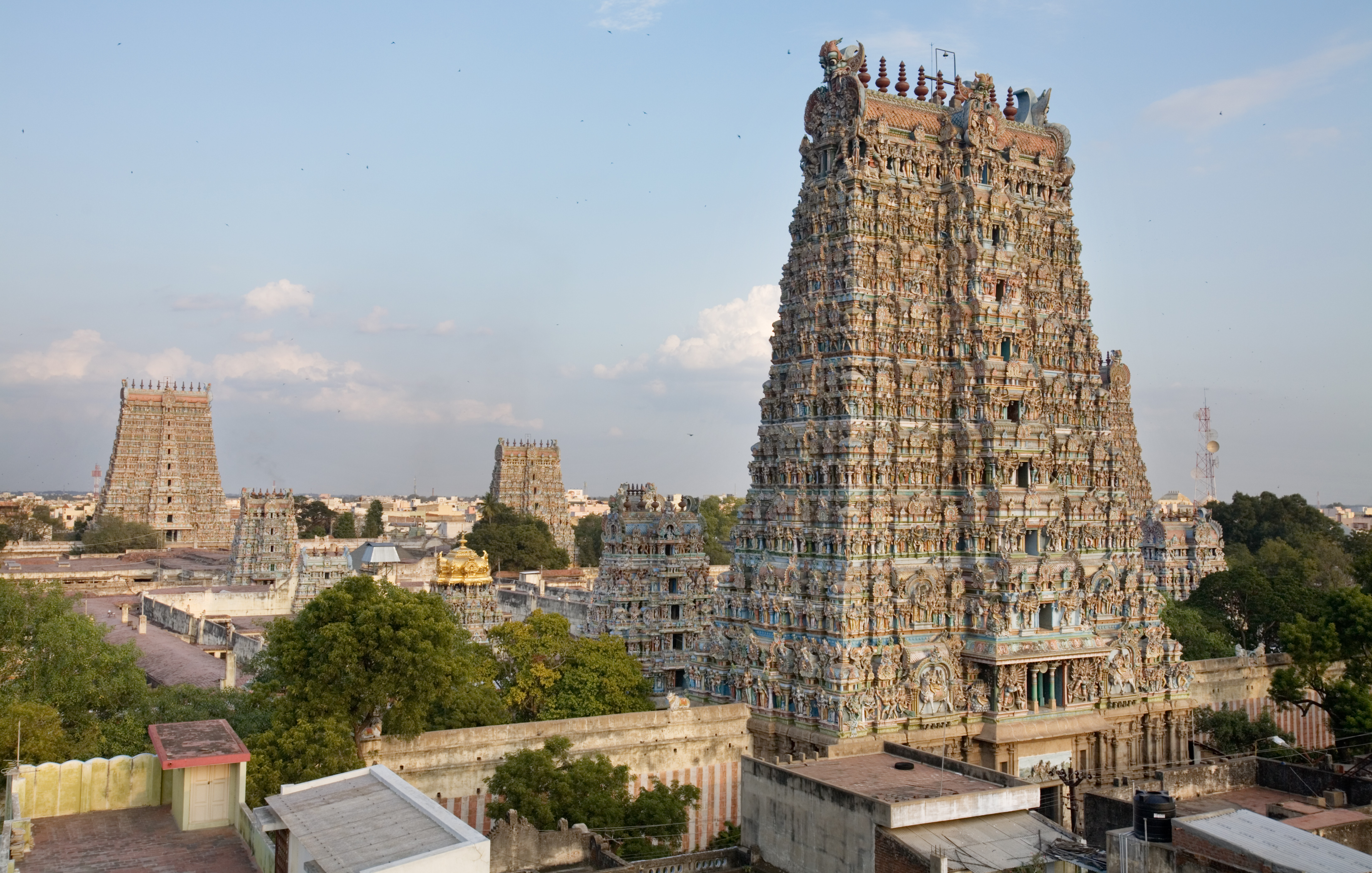
The Meenakshi Temple at Madurai.

Madurai was first inhabited by modern humans in the early Holocene, around 10000 years ago. Several tools and artifacts belonging to the Paleolithic and the Mesolithic, point towards a hunter-gatherer culture in the area, which appears to have been sparsely populated. Madurai's recorded history began around 2500 years ago, and the area has evolved into a major settlement over the centuries. It served as the seat of the Early Pandyas, and is mentioned in the Cilappatikaram and other works of the Sangam literature. Madurai is also described by Greek and Roman scholars of the period. After the Kalabhras defeated the Pandyas, they subsequently occupied Madurai.

In the late 6th century CE, the city was conquered by the later Pandyas. The city was later ruled by the Imperial Cholas, with the Pandyas as their subordinates. Successively, Madurai became the capital of the Imperial Pandyas, and under their rule, the city's economy underwent advancement. In the early 14th century CE, Madurai was invaded by Malik Kafur, and then multiple times consecutively by the Delhi Sultanate. Civil wars broke out between the Pandyas too, and the city was devastated by the invasions and riots. Later, rebelling factions of the Delhi Sultanate established the Madurai Sultanate, centred around the city.

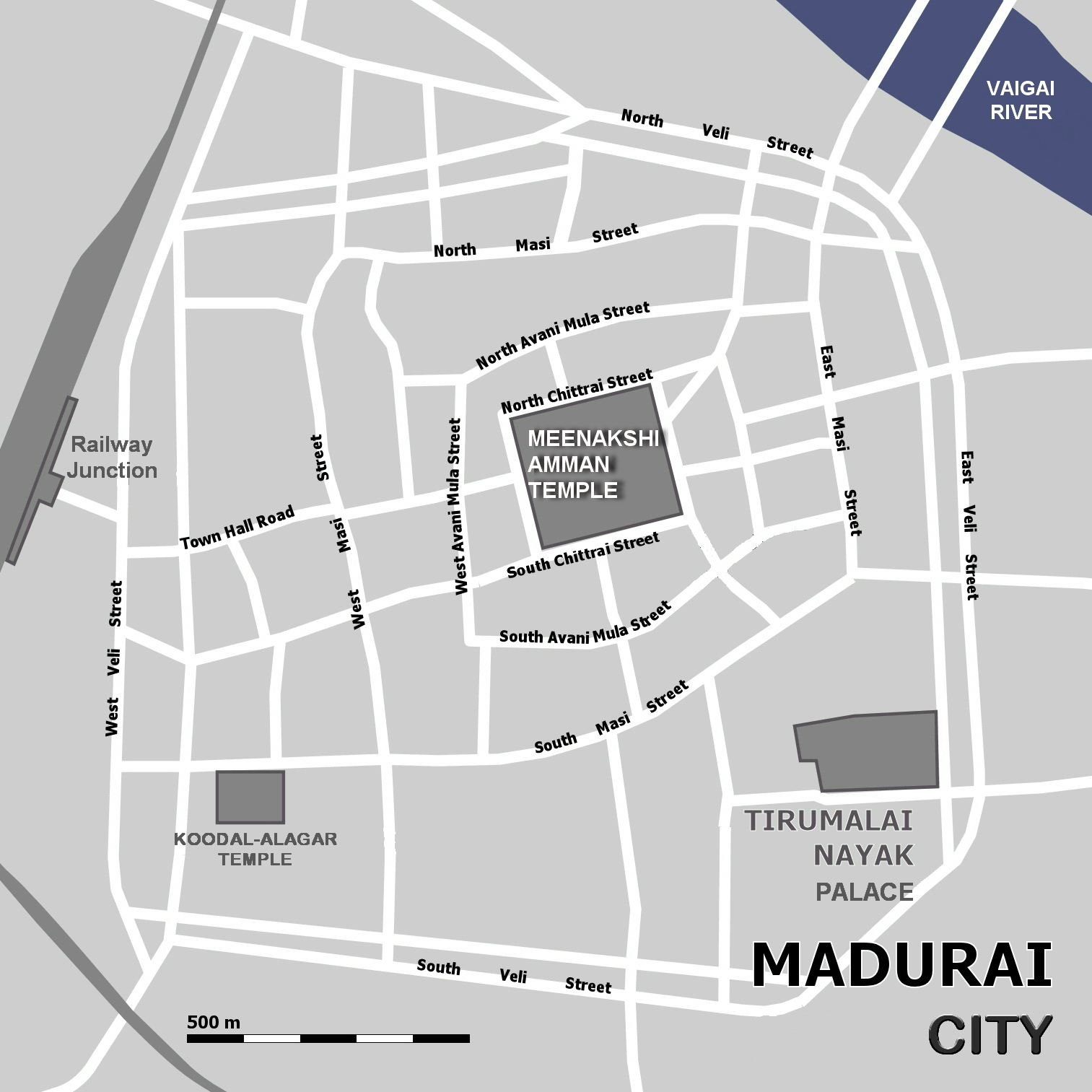
Map of Madurai, with some important landmarks

Then, Madurai was conquered by the Vijayanagara Empire under Kumara Kampana, who actuated renovations of the city. The Vijayanagara rulers appointed the Nayakas as the governors of the city. In a transient period of rule, the Nayakas declared their independence, and established Madurai as their capital. The city was expanded and renovated by the Nayaks. After a relatively brief period of rule under the Carnatic Nawab (aided by the East India Company, against the French East India Company), Madurai was officially ceded to the British East India Company in 1801 CE. Madurai later came under the rule of the British Raj, which developed the economy and expanded the city. After the independence of India in 1947 CE, Madurai came under the Madras state, and later under the state of Tamil Nadu. Madurai was, as of 2011, the third largest metropolis in Tamil Nadu, and is a major centre of industry, education, culture, and religion.

== Prehistory ==
=== Early Holocene ===
Madurai and its vicinity has been inhabited by Homo sapiens since the Upper Paleolithic and the Mesolithic period. Quartzite tools belonging to the Upper Paleolithic period were found in the banks of the Vaigai, immediately north to the old town of Madurai, by the British archaeologist Robert Bruce Foote. Other sites to the south of Madurai have been dated to the Mesolithic period. Megaliths, dolmens, and menhirs dated to the Neolithic are found in Manamadurai and Perumal Malai, all of them in the vicinity of Madurai.

In the upper Gundar basin, around 20 km southwest to Madurai, 109 Microlithic sites have been identified. Located near Tirumangalam and Usilampatti, these exhibit clear signs of Mesolithic habitation. Blades, hammerstones, chips, flakes and other lithic artifacts dated to the Mesolithic have been collected, and the stone toolkit of these peoples indicates the use of microlithic technology.

The environment around Madurai was in contrast with the present-day conditions. Humid conditions prevailed in the area during the early Holocene, and the semi-arid conditions of the present gradually came into being in the middle Holocene. The fauna included many Mesolithic wild animals; bones representing the Nilgiri tahr and the Zebu were found. Flora represented in the records include the Dioscorea yams and the Acacia caesia (Eenkai). The hunter-gatherer groups of the period had movement and foraging strategies similar in some ways to that of the Paliyans, who presently inhabit the area.

The Neolithic sites show development in technology; these people exhibit the use of macrolithic technology. Ringstones (or maceheads), made of gneiss and perforated with bores are also found, dating to the Neolithic. Hammerstones, buried urns, and megalithic tombs of this period are also found.

=== Iron Age (1000 BCE - 300 BCE) ===
The Iron Age in the region is marked by a shift towards iron technology; numerous iron swords, iron frames, and other tools and artifacts were found at sites surrounding Madurai. Potsherds, bowls, jars and black and red pottery collected at these sites show signs of gradual urbanization. Bones exhibiting signs of butchering and charring, were also discovered, along with bones of sheep and goats. Wootz steel, a kind of high carbon crucible steel, was also developed around this period, due to refinement in steel production methods.

== Early historic period (600 BCE - 300 CE) ==
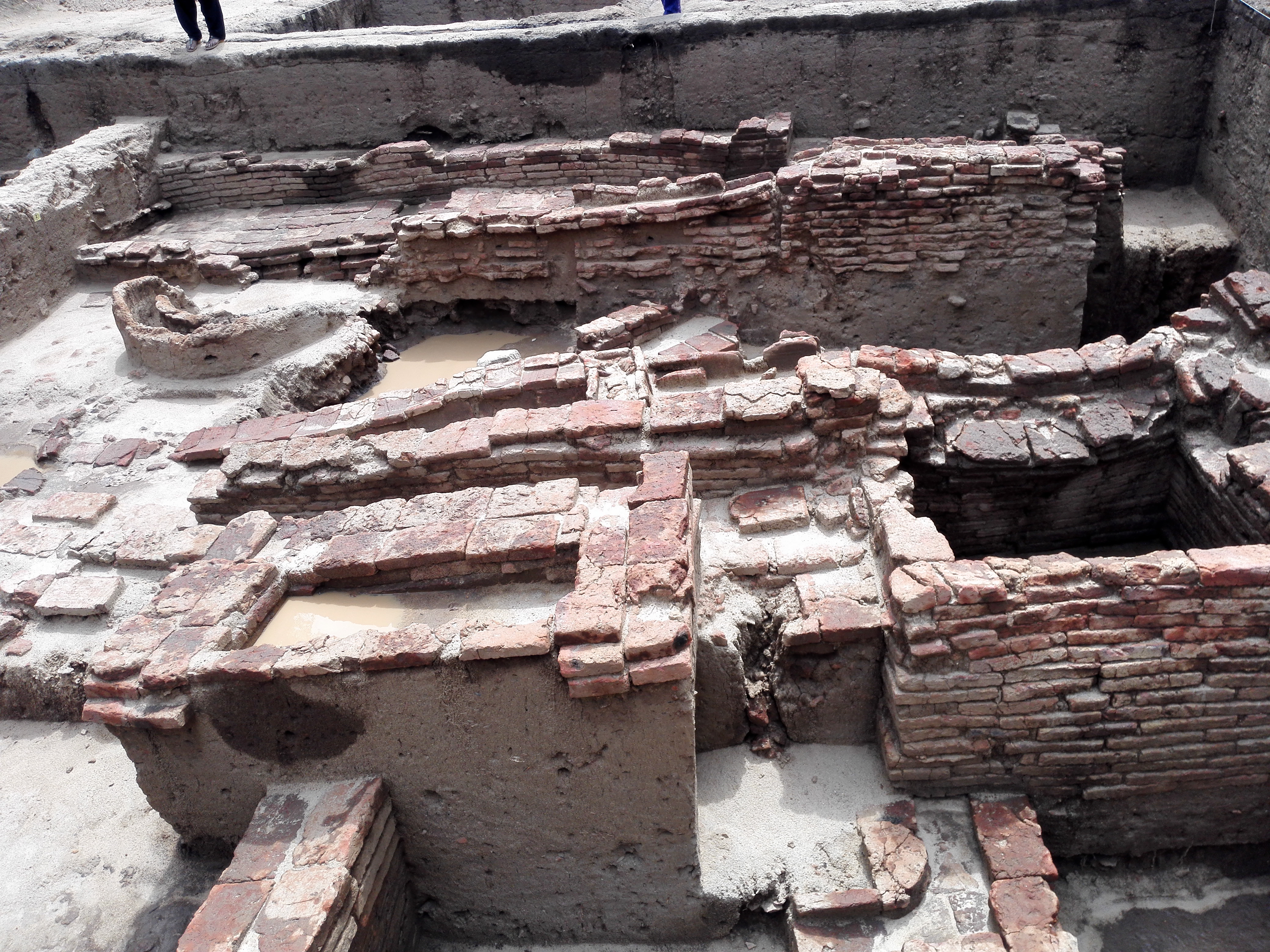
Archaeological remains at Keeladi

The recorded history of Madurai is roughly dated to the 3rd century BCE. The Sangam period settlement site of Keeladi, dating back to the 6th century BCE, is located about 12 kilometres southeast of Madurai. Inscriptions of the Pandya king Netunceliyan I (c. 2nd century BCE) are found in Mangulam, a village located 25 kilometres from Madurai.

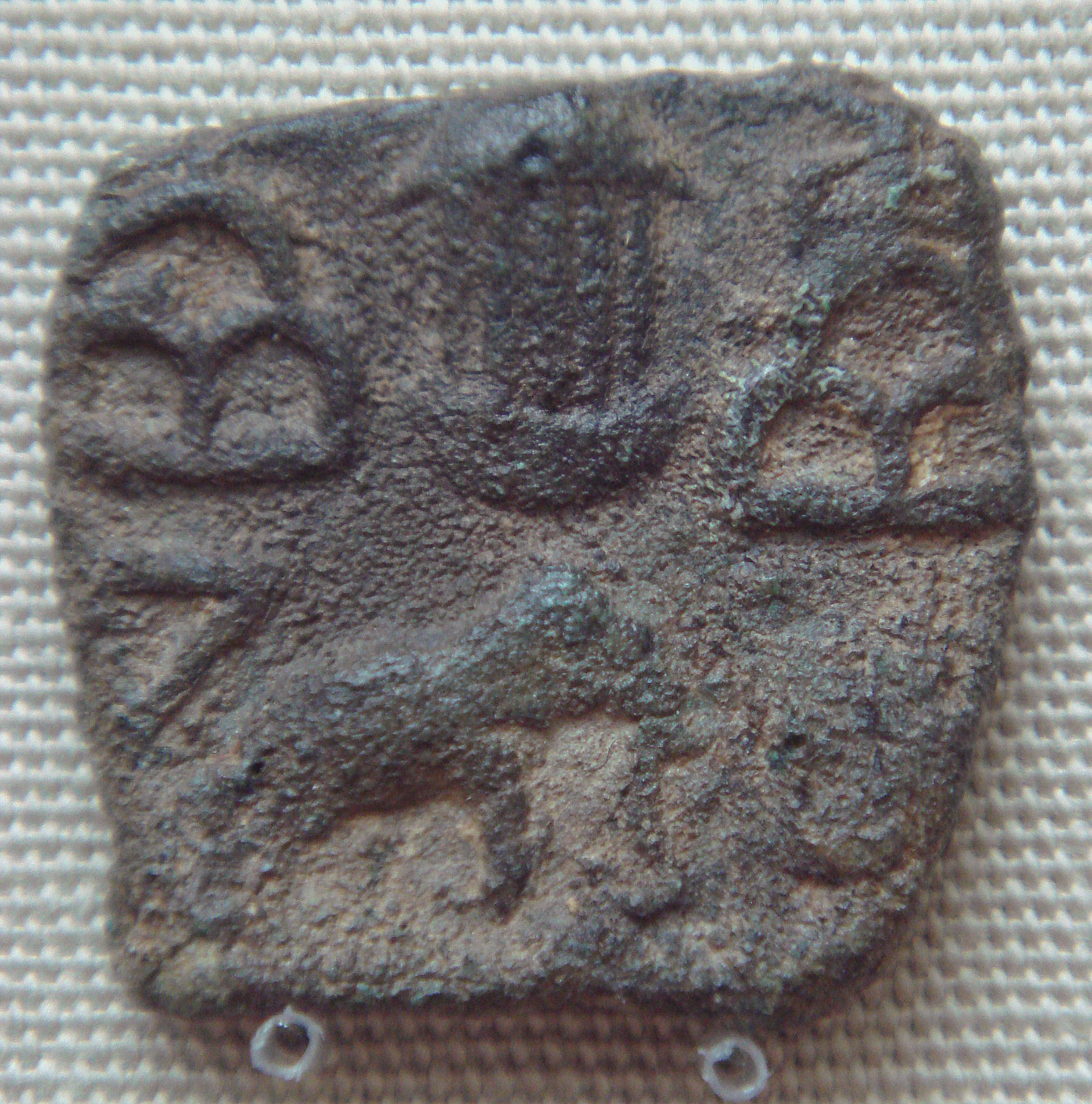
Pandya coin depicting a temple between hills, and an elephant. Sri Lanka, c. 1st century CE.

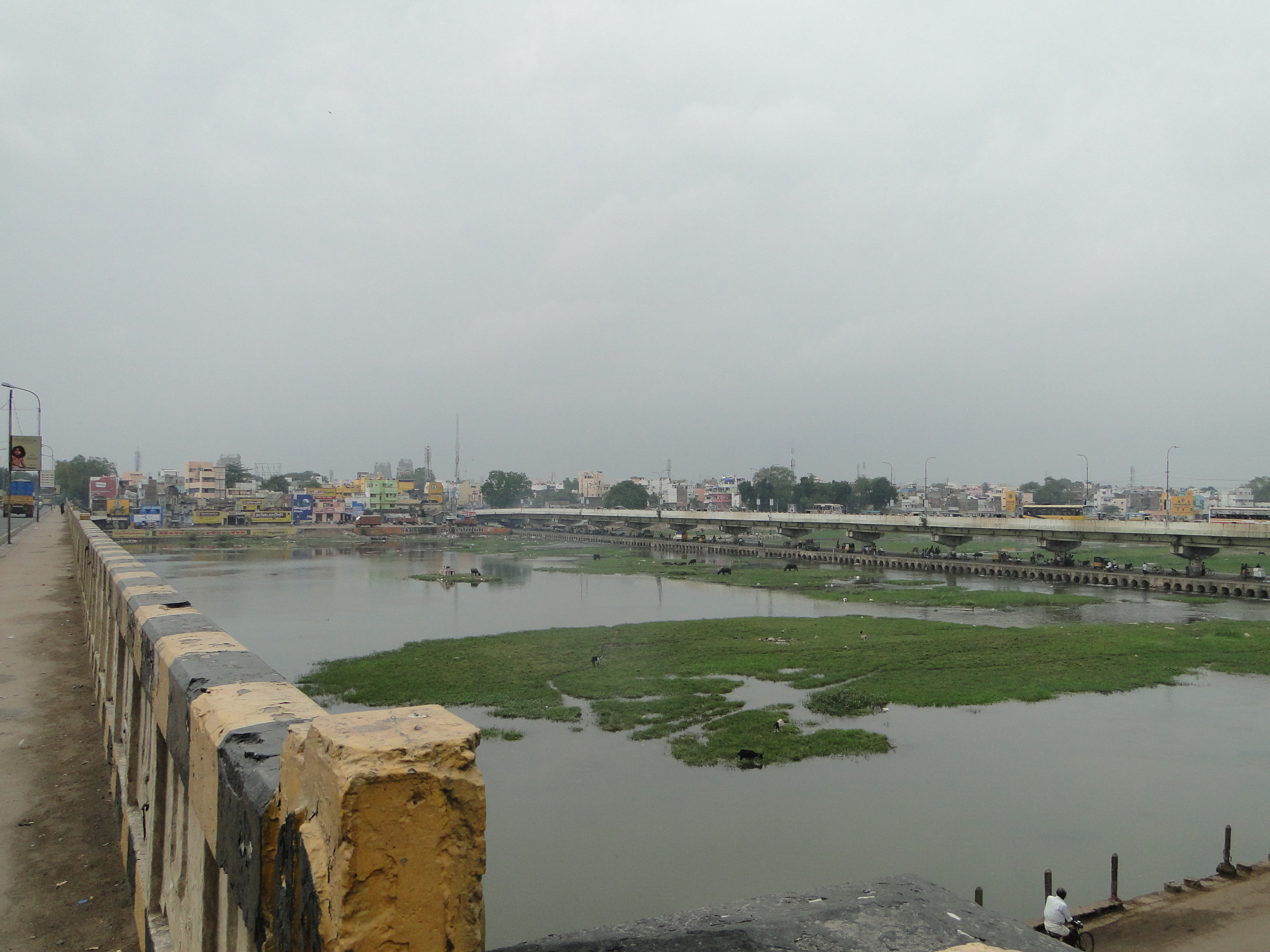
The Vaigai flowing through Madurai.

The Greek explorer Megasthenes may have visited Madurai during the 3rd century BCE; the city was mentioned as "Methora" in his accounts. The view is contested by some scholars who believe "Methora" refers to the north Indian city of Mathura, as it was an established city in the Mauryan Empire. Megasthenes reports an oral tradition of a deity venerated in "Methora", which, according to some scholars, serves as an early precursor to the legend of Meenakshi as Madurai's tutelary deity. The story begins with a male deity, whose only daughter was given an army, and a territory to rule. Her name, reports Megasthenes, was "Pandia", which she got from her kingdom's name. The god himself finally married her, unable to find a suitable spouse for her. The Pandyas did exist during this time, as evidenced by Ashoka's Major Rock Edict No., 2, so it is possible that Megasthenes did refer to Madurai. Madurai is also mentioned in Kautilya's (370–283 BCE) political treatise Arthashastra. Madurai is described in the Sri Lankan chronicle Mahavamsa, as "Madura", ruled by a Pandya contemporary of Prince Vijaya. Madurai is mentioned in the works of Roman historians Pliny the Younger (61 – c. 112 CE), Ptolemy (c. 90 – 168 CE), those of the Greek geographer Strabo (64/63 BCE – c. 24 CE), and in the Periplus of the Erythraean Sea. The country of the Pandyas was described as Pandya Mediterranea (the Pandyan inland) by Ptolemy, and the Pandyas themselves were mentioned as Modura Regia Pandionis (the Madurai-ruling Pandyans). The second book of the Tamil epic Silappatikaram (c. 5th century CE) is set in Madurai. Maturaikkāñci, another Sangam work dated to the 3rd century CE, describes the social life of people in ancient Madurai under the Pandyas, and in the broader Tamil realm. Further, the Sangam work Kalittokai refers to Madurai as "Koodal", "Mādakoodal", and as "Nānmādakoodal", and mentions the Vaigai bordering the northern rampart walls of the city. Another Sangam work, the Paripāṭal, describes Madurai (referring to the city as Koodal) and the Vaigai (referring to the river as Vaiyai) too. Many festivals were celebrated in Madurai, including the festival of Margali, during the Tiruvādhirai asterism.

=== Madurai in the Cilappatikaram ===
The Cilappatikaram describes Madurai, its environment and the lifestyle of its people. When approaching from the north (i.e., Uraiyur), Madurai is said to be located to the left of Sirumalai, near Tirumalkunram (Alagar Koil). Madurai is described as a busy city, with "smoke rising from kitchens and the broad bazaar where cooks fried cakes in pans, and the smoke of sacrificial offerings, along with the scent of flowers growing on the banks of Vaigai, including jasmine, creating a fragrant atmosphere". The city is described as surrounded by a moat, with flags set upon the city-fortress of Madurai. It had narrow passages leading from the moat into the fortress defended by Yavana soldiers; in its bazaar were:

[...] covered carts and other vehicles, ornamented chariots, coats of mail, attractive goads, gloves used in warfare, efficacious medicines, curved bludgeons, white furry fans, pig-faced shields, leather shields, shields with a picture of the forest on them, machines fitted with spears, workers in copper, bronzeworkers, newly-made ropes, garland-makers, saws made of steel, instruments for ivory cutting, burning incense pastes, and flower-work, which were so rich and innumerable [...] the wealthy street unpenetrated by enemies, full of groups of dealers in superior diamonds [...] Emeralds, semi-precious stones, gold, pearls, corals […]

— Ilango Adigal, translated by V R Ramachandra Dikshitar, The Silappadikaram (1939), Urkankadai, Canto-XIV, p. 199-208.

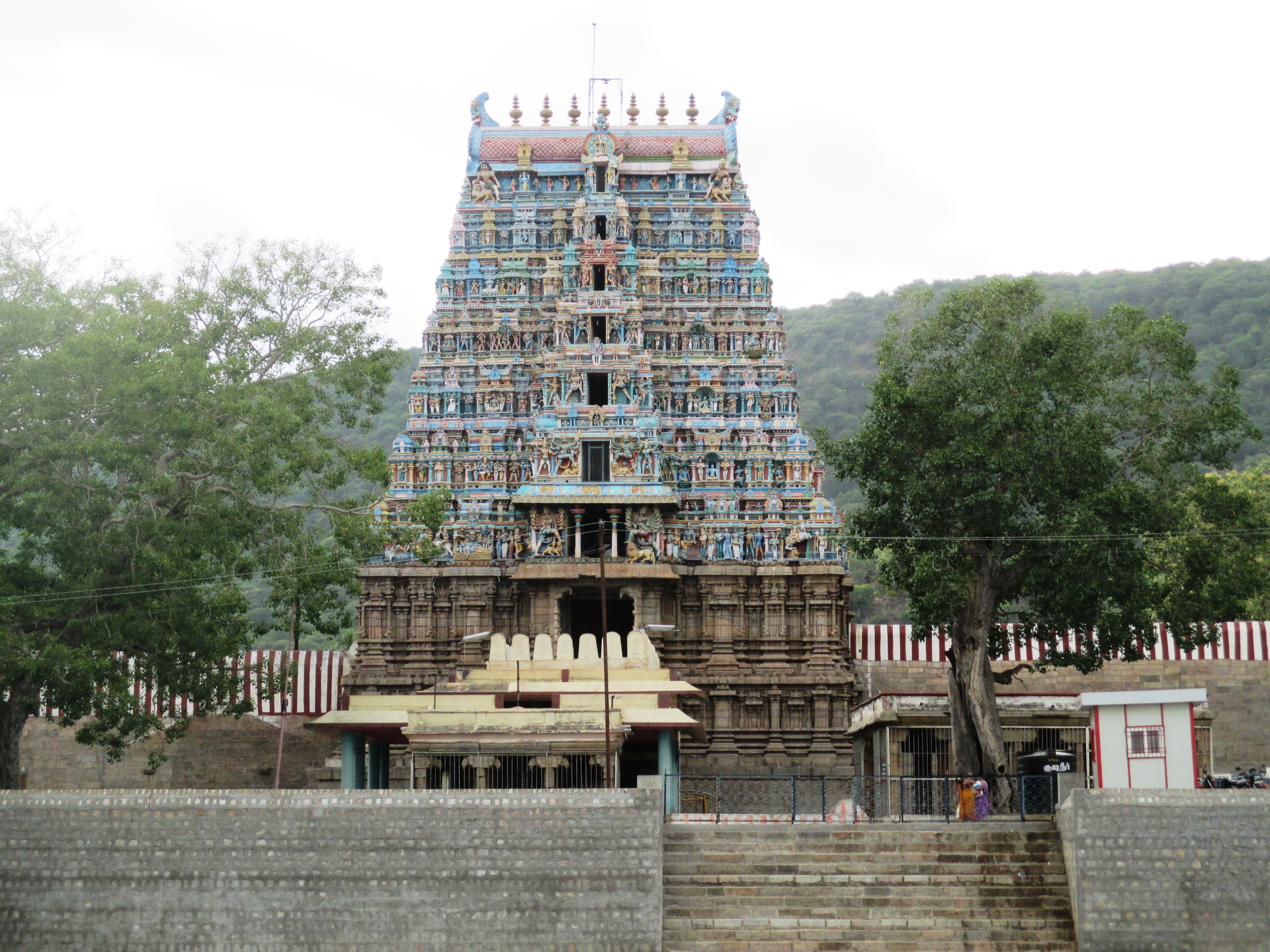
The Kallalagar Temple, Madurai.

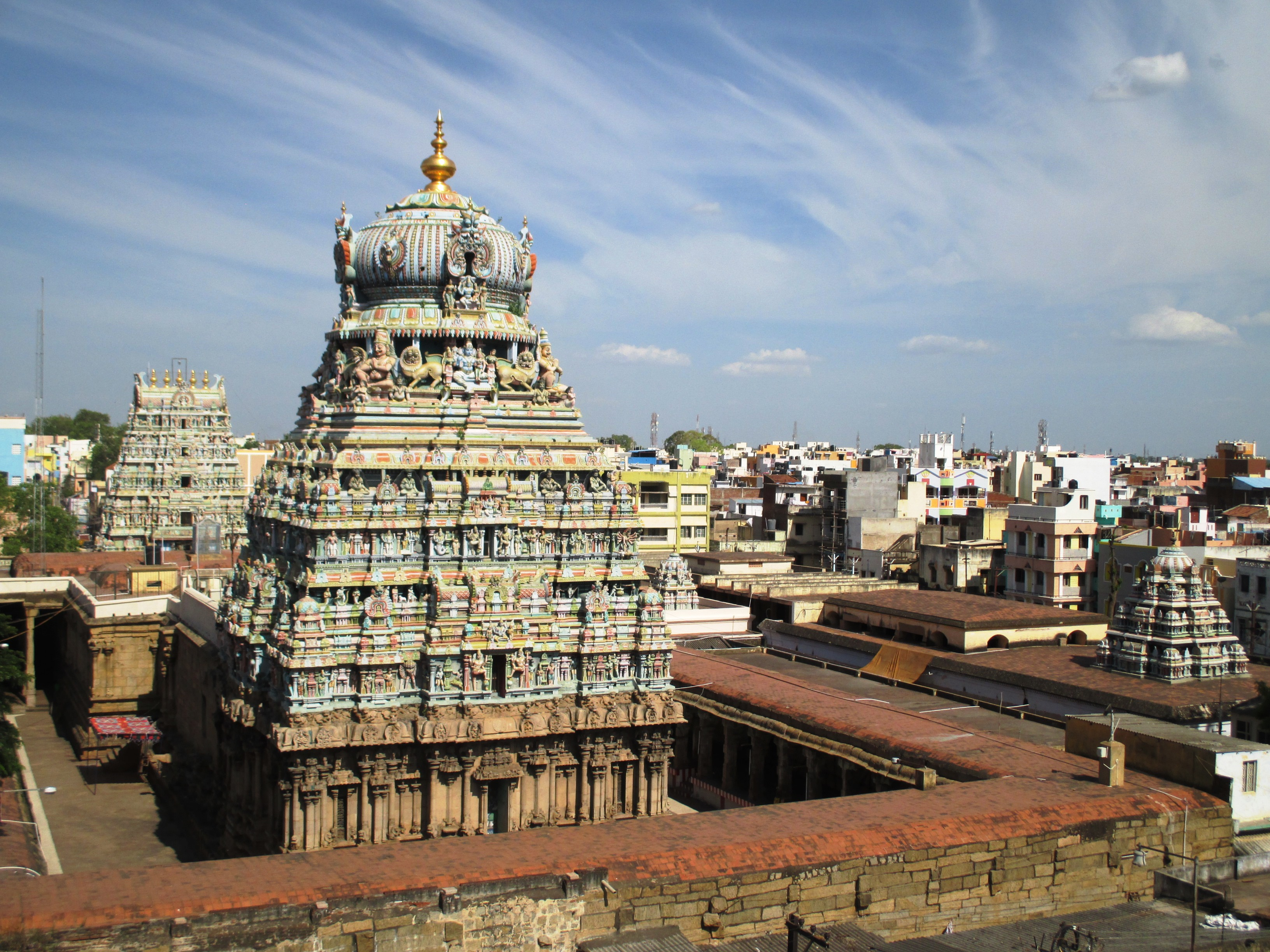
The Koodal Azhagar Temple, Madurai.

The tutelary goddess of Madurai, as described by the Cilappatikaram, was Madurāpati, who seems to have been another precursor to Meenakshi. Some attributes of the latter have been noted to be similar to that of Madurāpati, including a golden lotus in her hand, and her position as the family deity of Pandyas. The Kallalagar Temple is referenced in the Cilappatikaram, as the abode of Tirumal (Vishnu).

=== Maturaikkanchi ===
The Maturaikkanci describes a well-structured administration in Madurai. Madurai is described as the capital city of the Pandyas, with fortified gates, and towers over them, a deep moat, a high rampart, two crowded bazaars, broad streets, mansions and markets. The city's gateways were high enough to allow elephants to pass through them, and the residences of the people had pillared halls and decorated walls. Stucco images and statues were also set on the walls. The king had a palace. In its courtyard, musk deer and swan were kept. The walls were plastered and decorated with mural paintings of flowers and ornamental designs. The king had ministers, officials and judges.

Patrolmen and soldiers watched the streets, collected tolls and protected the traders from theft. The city had many temples; families carried offerings to the gods in these temples, and inside these temples were musicians playing various styles of music, according to the Maturaikkanci.

People of various cultures and languages lived in the city, and people belonging to the same occupation resided together. Various flags were hoisted in the city, and musical instruments such as the parai were used to herald information and to make announcements. The city was busy with a great influx of artisans and traders. Madurai is described to have been active throughout the night too, with markets operating actively as during the daytime. The people wore either embroidered garments of silk, or cotton clothes. They wore necklaces of pearls, bangles of seashells, gem-set gold rings, flower garlands and anklets. They wore flowing garments, flowers on their tufts of hair, ornate headdresses, and anklets with inlaid pearls and gemstones.

=== Madurai in the Paripāṭal ===
Seventeen poems of the Paripātal are dedicated to the Vaigai, and 4 others are dedicated to Madurai. The Paripātal talks of the people of Madurai enjoying themselves in the banks of the Vaigai, and engaging in water sports in the river. It describes the Pandya king resorting to the river too. The city of Madurai is described by the deployment of a simile as follows:

Like the lotus blossomed from the navel of Māyōn [Vishnu] is the eminent city [Madurai];
the petals of the flower, its streets;
the precious pericarp, the palace of the lord;
the pollen of the blossom,
the inhabitants, speakers of pure Tamil;
the bees living on pollen, those living on gifts.
Unlike the dwellers of Vanchi and Kōḻi
[the capitals of the Cheras and the Cholas respectively],
who awake at the crowing of the cock,
the inhabitants of our excellent city [Madurai]
wake from their protected sleep
with the resounding recitations of the four Vedas
born from the breath of the One born from the flower, Brahma.

— Paripāṭal, as translated by Holly Baker Reynolds in 'The City as a Sacred Center', Madurai: Kōyil Nakar

The poem, comparing Madurai to the lotus blossoming from the navel of Vishnu, has imparted a cosmogonic symbolism to the city, according to Holly Baker Reynolds. The Paripāṭal also describes the city to be "greater" than the rest of the world, in poetic significance:

When the world on one plate against Madurai on the other [plate of a weighing scale]
is measured by poets and scholars [to determine their value of knowledge],
the plate of the world diminishes [in value] and rises high,
while the city of the southern king [Pandyas], Nāṉmāṭakūṭal [Madurai], stays valuable.

— Madurai [fragmented poem 6], Paripāṭal (translated)

The work then describes the lifestyle of the city's people, who are mentioned to have spent their leisure, and to have offered prayers on the banks of the Vaigai. People raced in the river using simple rafts, and lovers united on the riverbank. Some women dropped figurines of crabs and fishes as offerings into the river. Sevvel (Murugan) and Māyōn (Vishnu) are referred to as the primary deities, with songs composed in praise of them. The Pandyan army is described to be like the floods in the Vaigai, "uncontrollably rushing forward". People are described to have lived in separate quarters, and are said to have worn flower garlands, ornamental chains and headdresses.

== Kalabhra dynasty (300–590 CE) ==
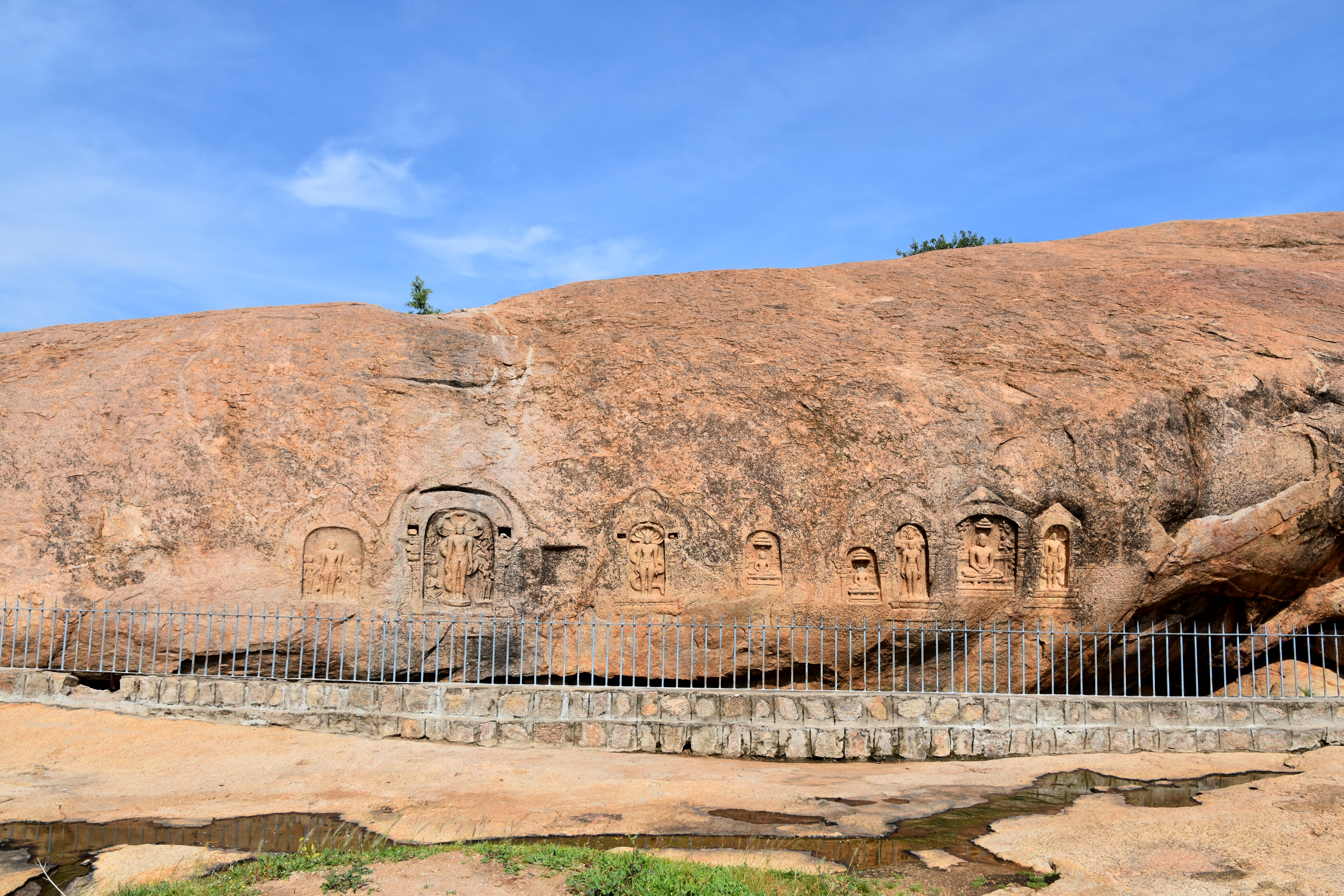
Jain sculptures at Samanar Hills, Kilakuyilkudi.

After the Sangam age, most of present-day Tamil Nadu, including Madurai, came under the rule of the Kalabhra dynasty. Many Pallava and Pandya records describe how the Kalabhras defeated the Cholas, Pandyas, and Cheras and established their rule. Jainism and Buddhism attained prominence in this period. A Dravida sangam is said to have been established by the Jain monk Vajranandi, a pupil of Pujyapada, at Madurai, in 470 CE. Murthi Nayanar, a Saiva saint, is speculated to have lived in Madurai in this period. Literary works, like the Manimekalai, are assigned to this period. The Kalabhra dynasty was finally overthrown by the Pandya dynasty around 590 CE.

== Pandya dynasty (590–1100 CE) ==
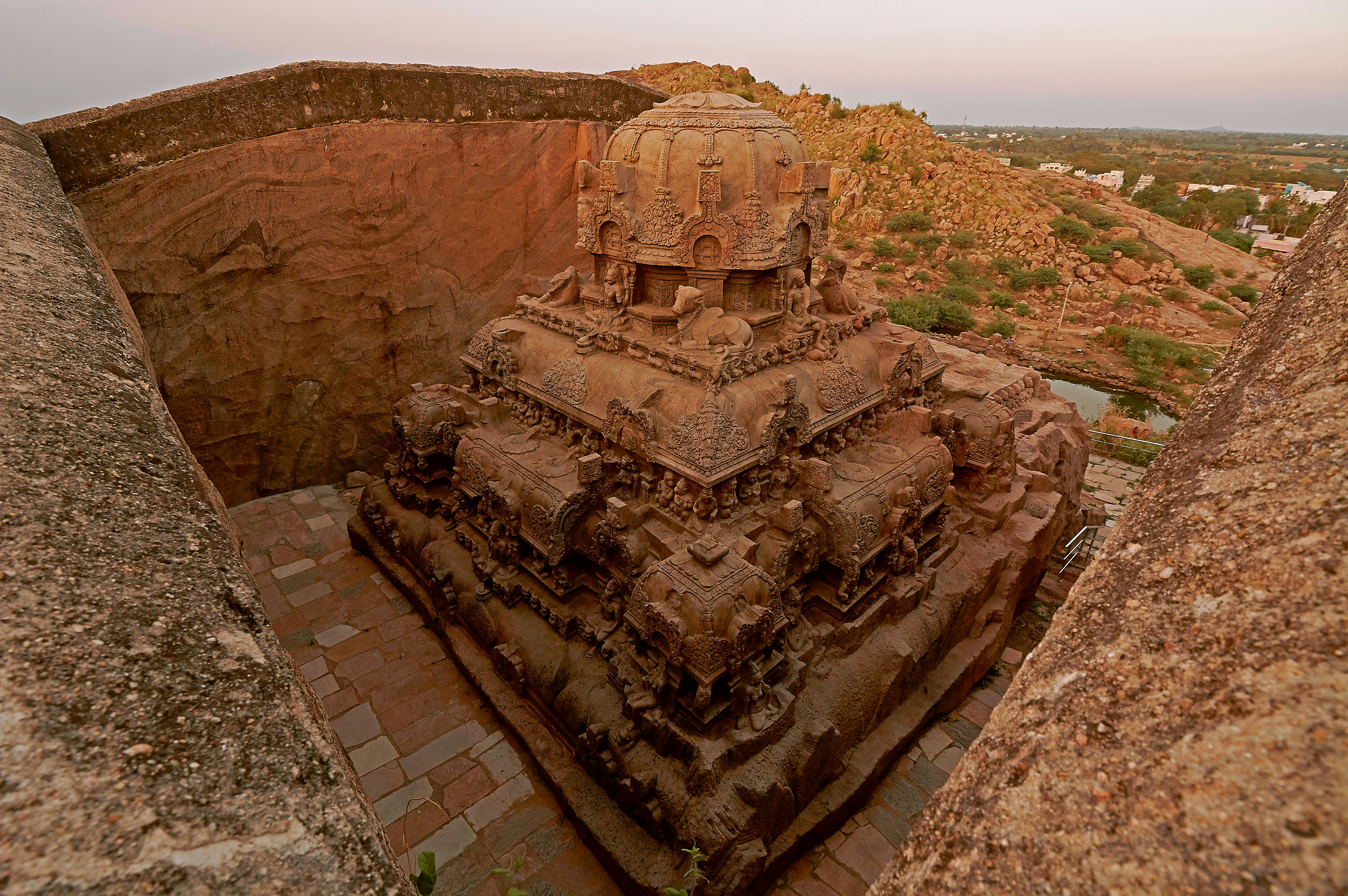
Vettuvan Koil, Kalugumalai, Thoothukudi. Built by the Pandyas, c. 8th century CE.

The Kalabhra dynasty was expelled by the Pandyas under Kadunkon, who lived around 590 CE. The Bhakti saint Sambandar sings in praise of the Sokkanāthar (Siva) of Madurai, and refers to him as "Aalavai annal", the great god of Aalavai. As another sobriquet for Madurai, Aalavai can either refer to the mythological snake Vasuki (source of the poison "Halahala"), which belonged to Shiva, encircling the city, or to the water-filled moats surrounding it (with "Aal" meaning "water"). Arikesari Maravarman is arguably the best known ruler of this period. He is said to have been victorious in battles with the Pallavas and the Cheras, among many others. Arikesari is also identified with Koon Pandyan, mentioned as a contemporary of Sambandar.

Kadunkon's other descendant, Maravarman Rajasimha I, is reported to have renovated the city of Madurai, in his time. By the 7th century CE, Madurai (Note: As "Koodal" (Tamil; lit., "assembly")) had become the sole capital of the Pandyas, who had ruled from Korkai too until the 5th century. (Note: As mentioned in the Cilappatikaram.) Pandya Kochadaiyan Ranadhira's title, "Madhura[i]-karunātakan", conferred upon him on his victory over the Western Chalukyas (the Karnātaka), is indicative of the evolution of Madurai as the Pandya homeland by this time. The Velvikudi grant of Nedunjadaiyan is a major source of information about this period. Periyalvar, a Vaishnava bhakti saint, is generally considered to have won in a religious disputation in the Madurai court of the Pandya Srimara Srivallabha. Successive rulers expanded the Pandya territory, and by the start of the 9th century, they controlled much of the ancient Tamilakam, until they were checked on their north by the growing Cholas.

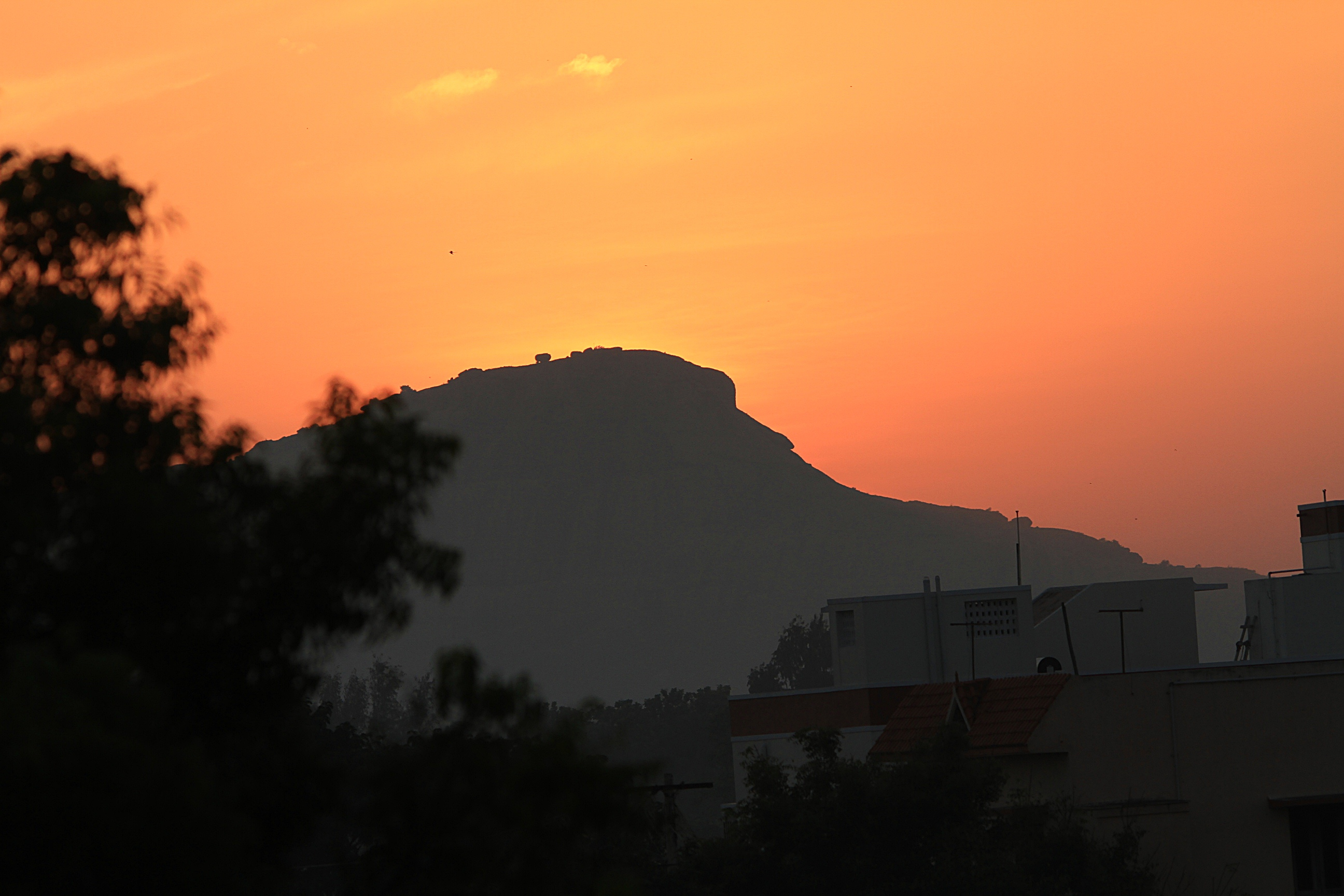
Yanaimalai, Madurai.

Yanaimalai, in northeast Madurai, is heavily referenced by other works of this period. Two inscriptions, dating to c. 770 CE, belonging to the reign of Maranjadaiyan Nedunjadaiyan (son of Maravarman Rajasimha I, and issuer of the Velvikudi grant) were discovered at the Yanaimalai Narasingam temple. Yanaimalai accommodated Jains too; figures of Mahavira, Parsvanatha, Bahubali, and Yakshi Ambika were sculpted on the hill, by around 850 CE. The inscriptions are carved in the Vatteluttu and in the Tamil Grantha scripts.

== Chola dynasty (910–1100 CE) ==
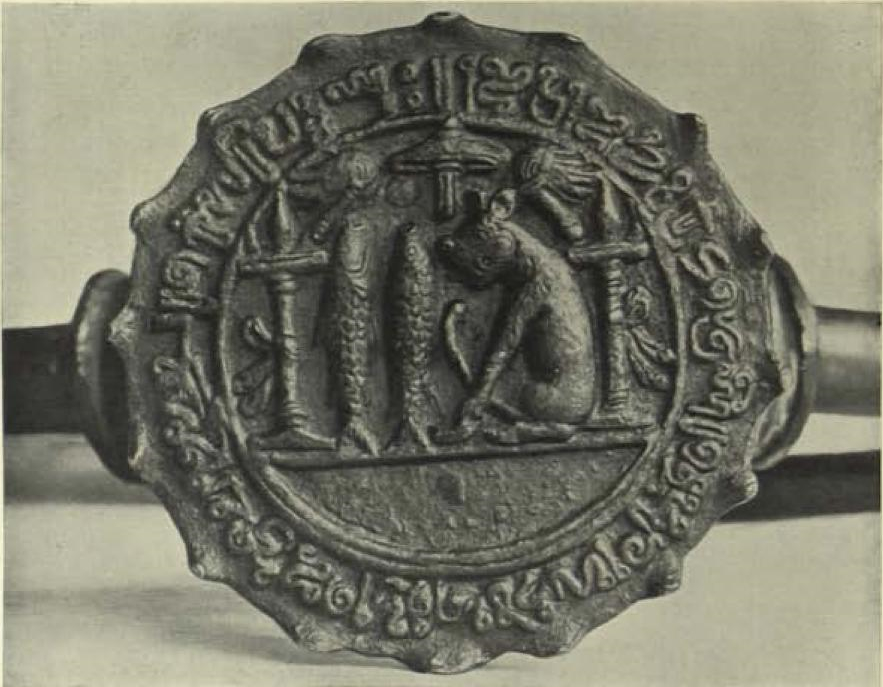
Royal seal of Rajaraja I, depicting the emblems of the Cholas (tiger), and the Pandyas (twin fishes) as a sign of overlordship over both of them. Larger Leiden Plates, c. 1006 AD.

The Pandyas were subjugated by the Chola dynasty during the early 9th century, and Madurai remained under the control of the Cholas until the early 13th century, when the second Pandyan empire was established with Madurai as its capital. Parantaka I was the first Imperial Chola to capture Madurai (and to assume the title "Matiraikkonda", literally "the conqueror of Madurai"), and with some struggle, the Cholas, under Rajaraja I, finally managed to subdue the Pandyas. To keep the Pandyas under control, the Cholas appointed members of their own royal family as viceroys of these Pandyan provinces, known by their title "Chola-Pandya". The Pandyas ruled as rebelling subordinates to these Cholas, from Madurai.

The Cholas constructed many palaces and made donations to the temples of the city. Rajendra I constructed a palace here, and Chola inscriptions of this period refer to thrones, gardens, chambers, ramparts and halls of the city. Kulothunga III worshipped the deity of Aalavai (Madurai), and made gifts to the temple.

== Imperial Pandyas (1100–1300 CE) ==
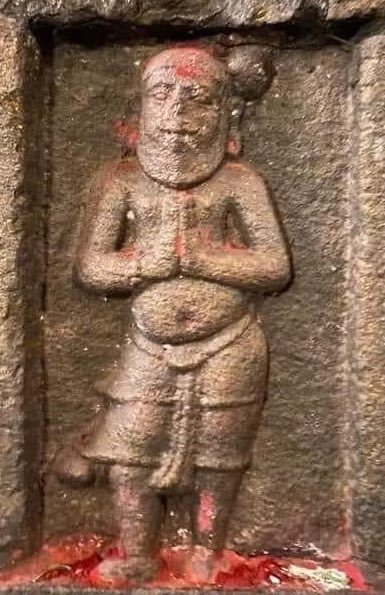
Bas-relief of a king, identified to be that of Jatavarman Sundara Pandyan I

From the start of Kulottunga I's reign, the Pandyas started to rebel against the Cholas. With the Pandyan Civil war of the 12th century, the Pandyas started to gradually gain power, though they remained rebelling vassals of the Chola Empire. When Sadayavarman Kulasekaran I refused to pay tribute to the Cholas, the Cholas, under Kulothunga Chola III, invaded Madurai, defeated the Pandyas, performed Vīrābisheka (Note: lit., anointment of the hero) at Madurai, destroyed the coronation hall of the Pandyas, and sowed weeds (either Ricinus or Proso millets) on the ruins, ploughed by asses. The Pandya surrendered to Kulothunga, and Madurai remained under Chola dominance until 1216, when the successor Pandya, Maravarman Sundara Pandyan I, took control of Madurai, sacked Thanjavur and Uraiyur of the Cholas, performed Vīrābisheka at Pazhaiyarai, and drove the Cholas into exile. The Cholas then surrendered to Sundara, and paid homage to him, acknowledging his supremacy. Sundara's records also refer to his throne named Malavarāyan (lord of the Mazhavas) in a palace at Madurai.

A succeeding ruler, Jatavarman Sundara Pandyan I, is considered to be the greatest ruler of the Imperial Pandyas. It was under him that the Pandyan empire reached its greatest extent, stretching from Nellore in the north to Sri Lanka in the south, from the Arabian sea in the west to the Bay of Bengal in the east, and with Madurai as its capital. He built a pillared hall (mandapa) at Alagar Koil, and built the eastern gopuram of the Meenakshi Temple. Jatavarman was succeeded by Maravarman Kulasekara I.

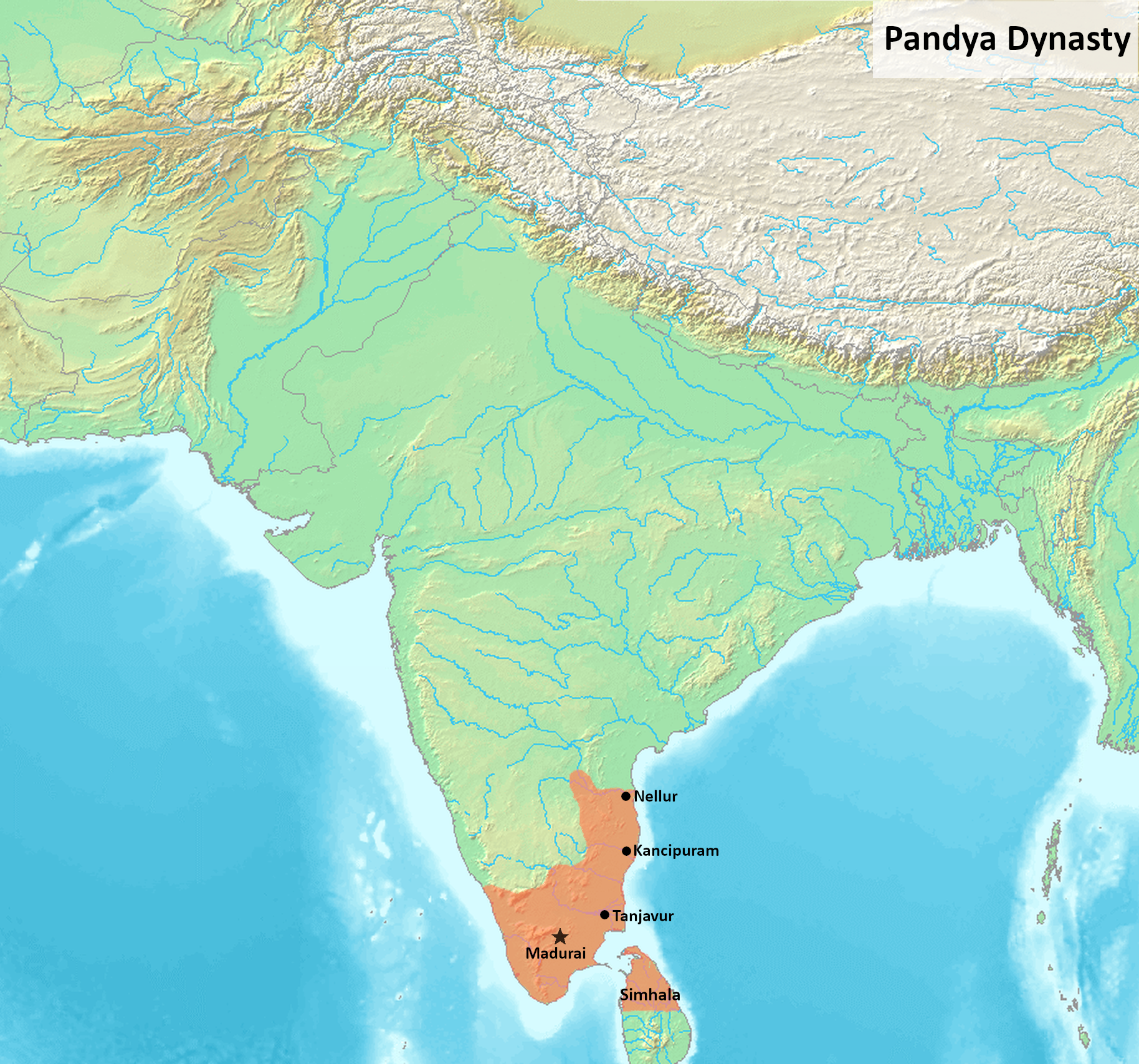
The Pandyas at their greatest extent, under Jatavarman Sundara Pandyan I.

=== Administration and Culture ===
Madurai, during this period, witnessed development in many fields. Local governance at village and town levels ensured efficient administration, and tanks, canals and sluices were built. Canals had the names and titles of kings, as evidenced by a "Parakrama Pandyan kaal". (Note: lit., canal of king Parakrama Pandya) Land revenue was the dominant form of income for the country, and temples were entitled to a share of these revenues for assuring their management. Trade groups operated in the city, including the Manigramam, the Anjuvannam, and a branch of the Ayyavole's Five Hundred.

The administration of the state was an elaborate process, consisting of bureaucrats, headed by the Pandyan king. The king performed his jobs by issuing oral orders in response to the concerned officials' request (Tamil: kēlvi). So as to execute these orders, the king's decree was entered in a special register (Tamil: varipottagam) by a special official (Tamil: tirumandira ōlai), and the revenue department (Tamil: puravuvari tinaikkala nāyagam), which handled these registers, issued an executive directive (Tamil: ōlai) to the relevant officers about enforcing the king's orders. The revenue department also issued an order document (Tamil: ulvari) in respect of the transaction carried out for the execution of the order, which was signed by revenue officers (Tamil: variyilār). The transaction was entered in the revenue register and the king's order was carried out. The revenue register was maintained at Madurai, detailing records of transactions, and land rights. After execution, the oral order and the order document were inscribed on stone, at temples, or as separate inscriptional blocks.

Justice was administered through a judiciary system that primarily operated at the local level. Different types of cases, ranging from civil disputes to criminal offences were tried by the village officers. In cases where no resolutions were determined, they were brought to the notice of the king and his officials at his court. For serious offences, property was confiscated and fines were levied.

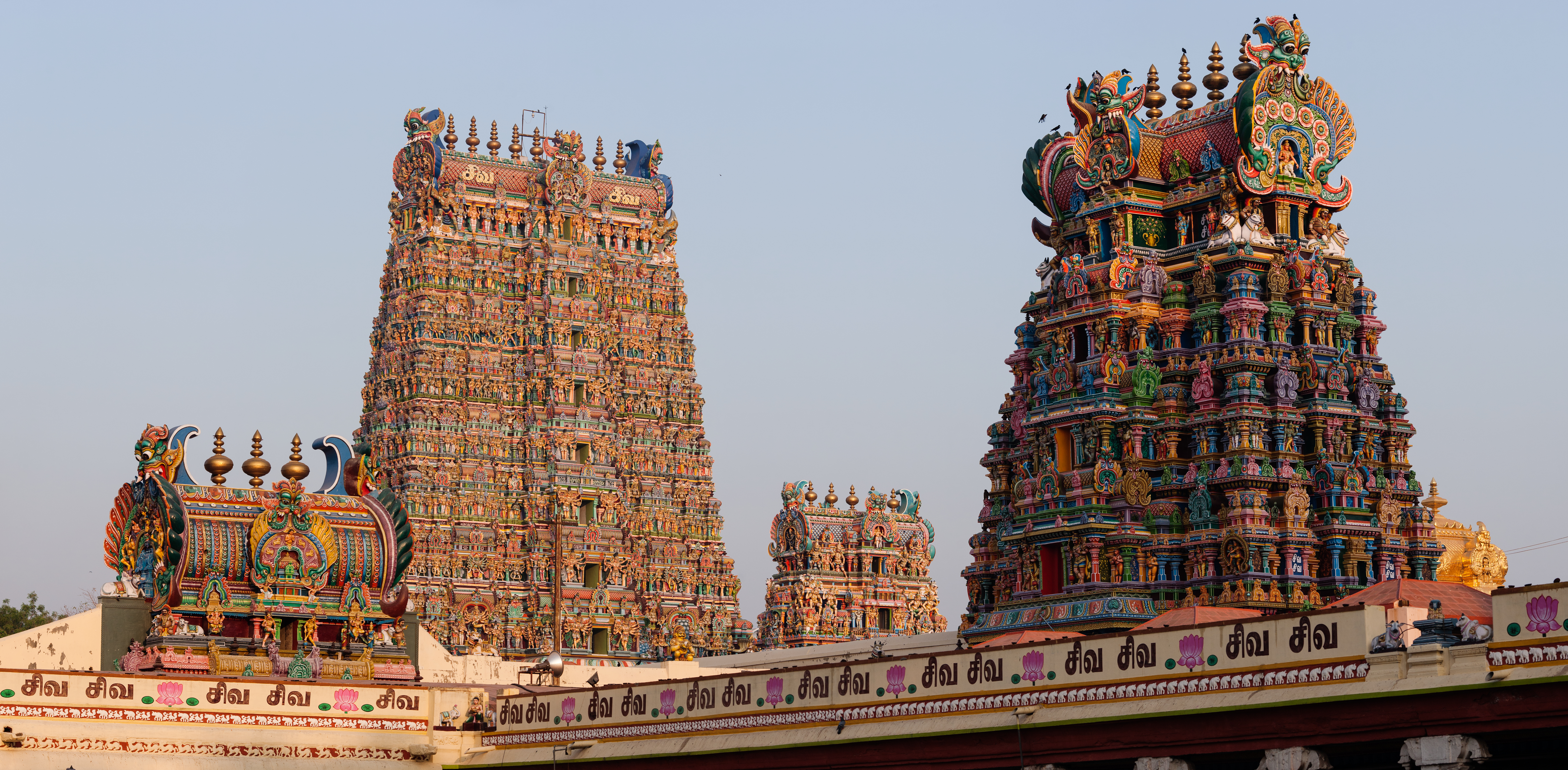
The Meenakshi Temple, Madurai.

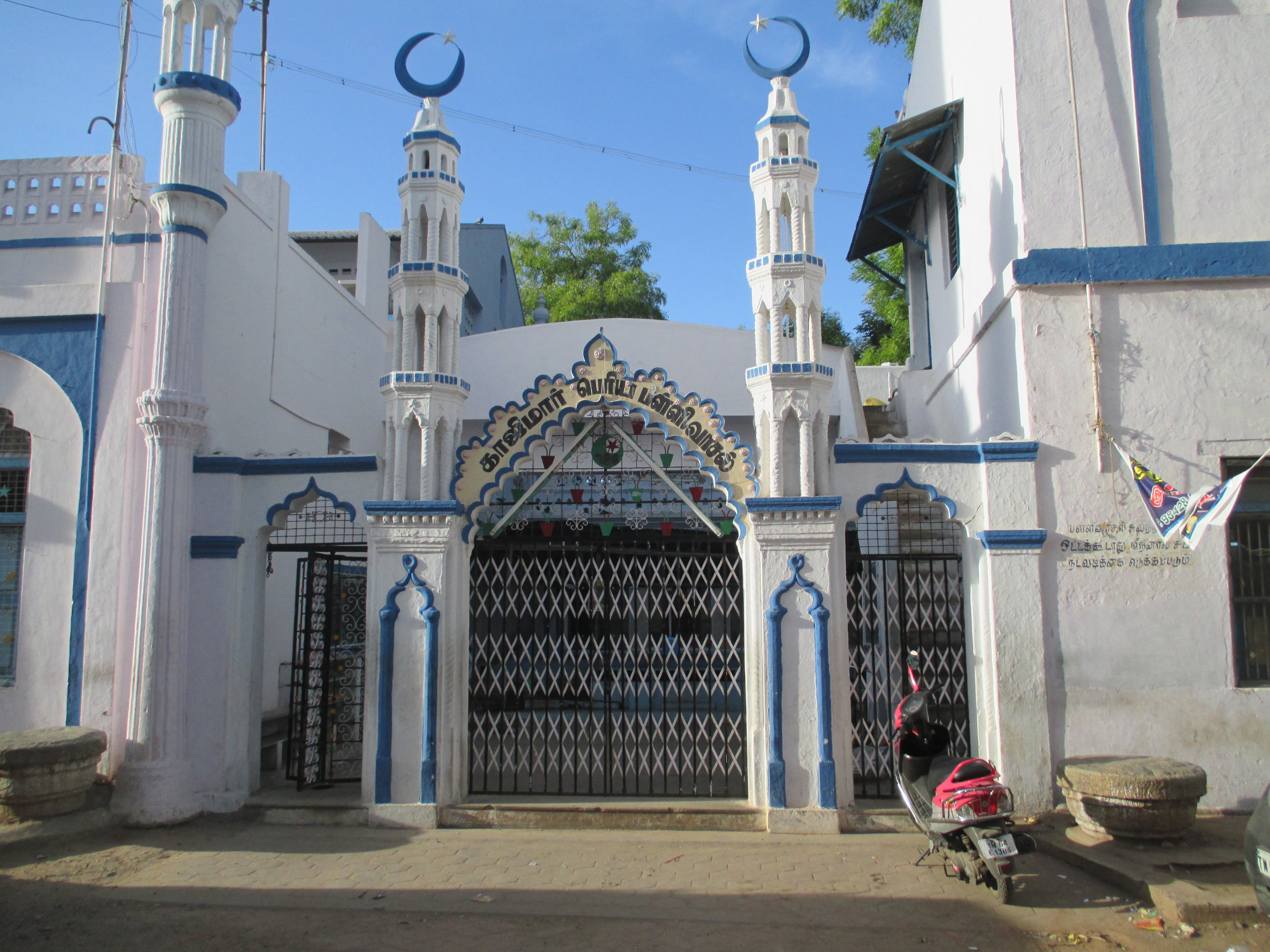
The Kazimar Big Mosque, Madurai.

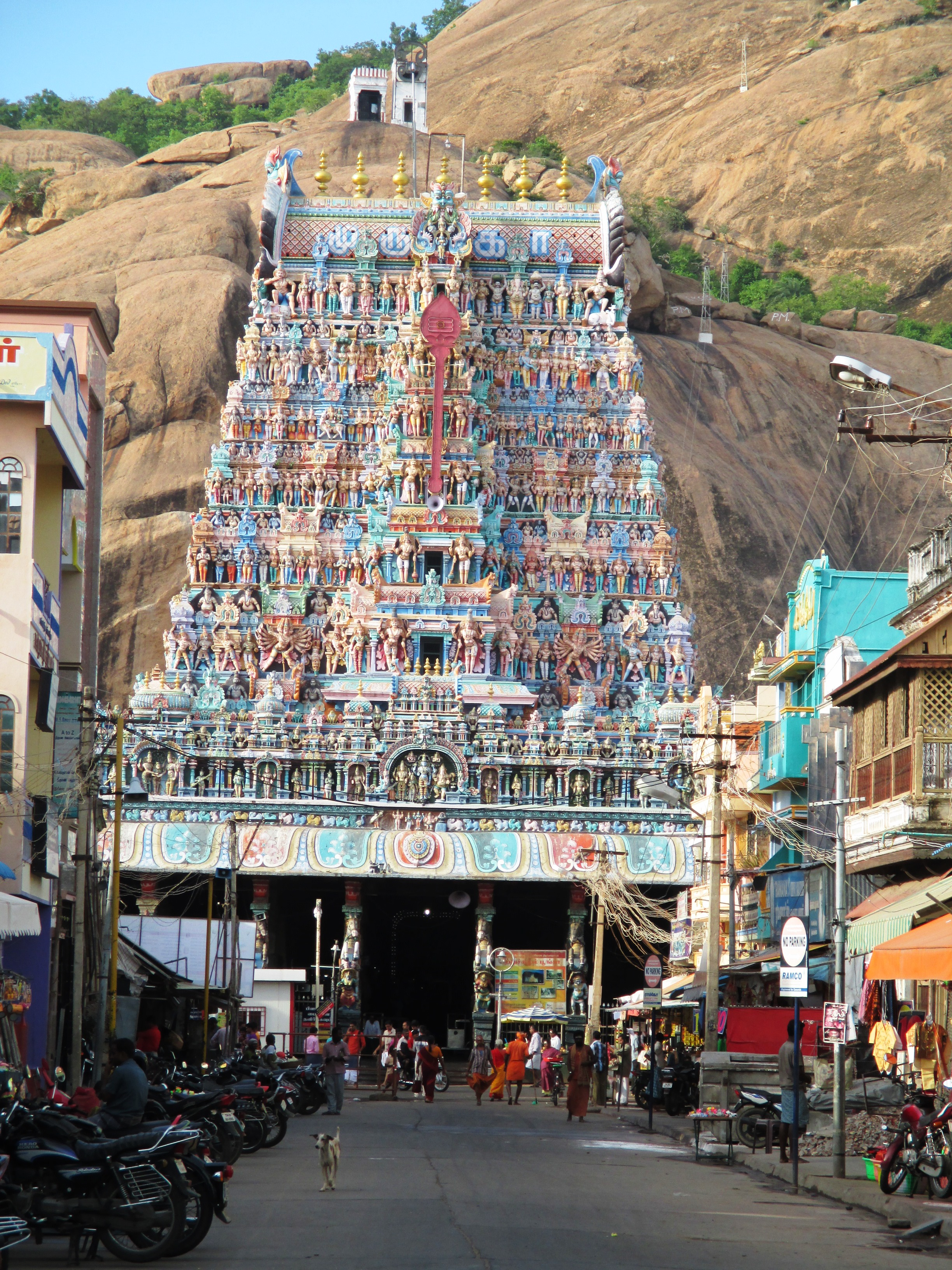
The Subramaniya Swamy Temple, Thiruparankundram.

Madurai came under the Mādakulamkīl province, centred around the Madakulam water tank. This tank is mentioned to have assumed great significance, with contemporary literary works of the period referencing it. Other places of this province included Thiruparankundram and Kodimangalam. The Meenakshi Temple, underwent expansion during this period; Meenakshi was referred to as "Tirukāmakottattu Āludaiya Nāchiyār", and Sundaresvara (Shiva) was referred to as "Tiruālavāiyudaiya Nāyanār". Donations were made by the kings and the commoners alike, to the temples, for the maintenance of lamps, rituals, mathas, festivals, and for its workers. A literary work, the "Tiruppani malai", which describes the constructions and renovations at the Meenakshi temple, gives the date of the nine-storeyed gopuram of the Sundaresvara (Shiva) shrine to be 1218 CE, built by Maravarman Sundara Pandyan I. The east gopuram of the temple, built by Jatavarman Sundara Pandyan I, features a double fish crest, the Pandyan insignia. The Meenakshi shrine's three-storeyed gopuram was built by Anandatandava Nambi, or his wife, in 1228 CE, under Maravarman Sundara Pandyan I, according to the "Tiruppani malai" and its introductory verses, the "Tiruppani vivaram". The Kazimar Big Mosque is also said to have been constructed during this age, by Kazi Syed Tajuddin, in the late 13th century.

=== Marco Polo's visit ===
Marco Polo, the Venetian explorer, is considered to have visited India during the reign of Jatavarman Sundara Pandyan I, with the former mentioning the Pandyan empire to be prospering, in his time. He speaks of five Pandya brothers ruling the domain together, and Sundara Pandyan being crowned the king of the country. He refers to Madurai as "Shehr Mandi", likely a borrowing of Persian "Shahr Pandi". (Note: lit., city of the Pandyas) He observes that the country was known for its pearls, and that the king had a great treasure from his entitlement of these pearls. He describes the customs of the country, that the people, including the king, wore a piece of cloth in all, and that the king's ornaments contained emeralds, rubies, sapphires, gold, pearls, and other gemstones; the king also had a string of pearls (considered to be a japamala). The king had his own āpattudavikal, his trusted bodyguards. They accompanied him to death, and cast themselves into the cremation fire of their dead king, in a belief of accompanying him beyond life.

Marco Polo also mentions that the people of the Pandya country covered the walls of their house with cow dung. People of all classes, including the rulers, followed a custom of sitting on the ground alone. Rice was the major crop back then; the people were required to use the right hand to eat, and to use their own drinking vessels. The nobles slept on mats made of cane grass and Cyperus rotundus (see Pattamadai Mat), and the commoners slept on the floor. Most people were trained to become traders young in their lives.

== Delhi and Madurai Sultanates (1335–1378 CE) ==
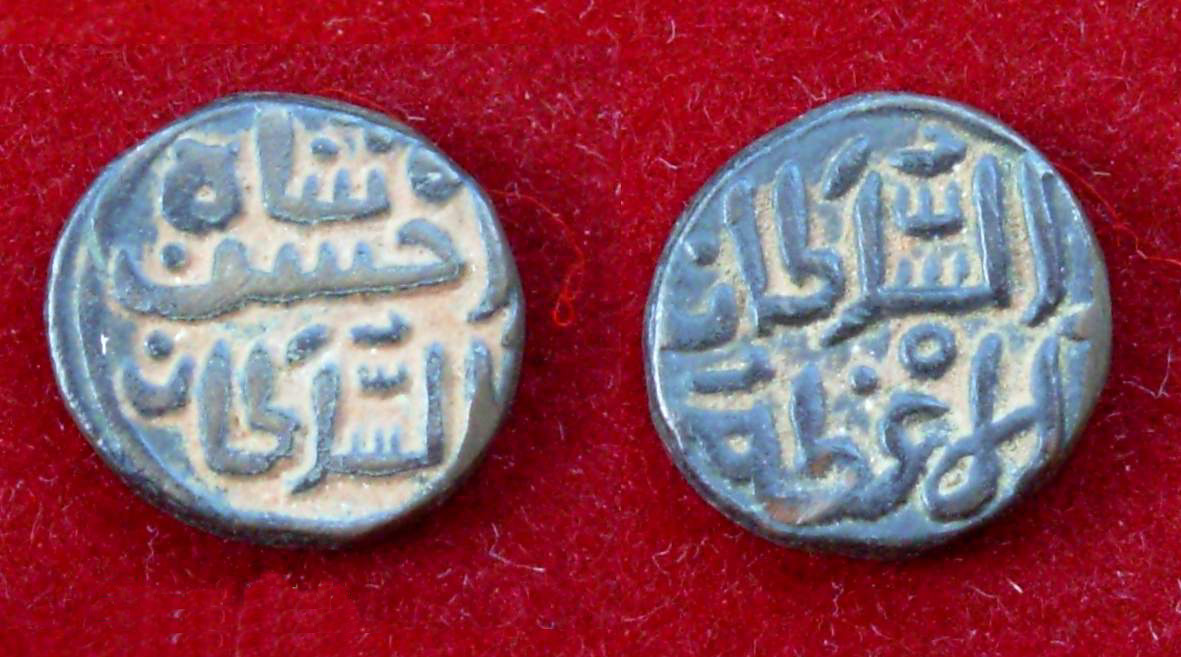
Coin of Jalaluddin Ahsan Khan, first ruler of the Sultanate of Madurai, 1335–1339 CE

After the death of Kulasekara Pandyan I (1268–1308 CE), his sons Vira Pandya IV and Sundara Pandya IV were engaged in a battle for the throne. Malik Kafur, who was involved in the siege of Warangal, heard of the Pandyan kingdom, its wealth, and the internal conflicts in the kingdom. With permission from Alauddin Khalji, he marched towards Madurai, reaching the Pandyan frontiers by March 1311 CE. As he marched towards Madurai, plundering and raiding cities on the way, he was opposed by the guerilla tactics of the Pandyas. Nevertheless, he raided Madurai on 10 April 1311 CE. The Pandyas had fled the city before his arrival, along with their royal family and their treasures. Kafur captured the few elephants left in the whole city, at the Meenakshi Temple, plundered the temple, and set fire to it. Kafur had also plundered the Nataraja Temple of Chidambaram (which had a gilded roof), and had captured 250 elephants there. Malik Kafur then retreated back.

After Malik Kafur's invasion, the civil war of the Pandyas was resumed again. Kulasekhara's son-in-law, Ravivarman, of the Venad Cheras, took advantage of the conditions, overran Madurai, into Kanchi. During the reign of Qutbuddin Mubarak Shah, Khusrau Khan led another expedition to Madurai. With these subsequent invasions, the Pandyas lost their Madurai stronghold. They ruled from the southern Pandya country, and occasionally led futile attacks on the new rulers of Madurai.

After the expedition of Khusrau Khan, Madurai was invaded by Muhammad bin Tughlaq, and the city came under the rule of the Delhi Sultanate, under the Tughluq dynasty. The then governor of Madurai, Jalaluddin Ahsan Khan, rebelled against the Delhi Sultanate, and declared his independence, establishing the Madurai Sultanate in 1335 CE. After a period of unstable governance due to internal conflicts, the Madurai Sultanate met its end in 1378 CE, defeated by the Vijayanagara Empire. By the end of the 15th century, the Pandyas, who had been ruling over Madurai for over a millennium, had lost the city forever; one branch moved over to Tenkasi, and other Pandya branches migrated to the southern parts of today's Tamil Nadu and Kerala.

=== Sources ===
The main sources of information about this period come from several Muslim scholars, including Ibn Battuta, Amir Khusrau, Abdul Malik Isami, Abulfeda, and Ziauddin Barani. Madurai is referred to as "Mathura" or "Mardi", and the city was said to have a near-impenetrable fortress surrounding it. Ibn Battuta speaks of an epidemic in Madurai that killed the population, and that the fourth Sultan of Madurai, Ghiyasuddin Muhammad Damghani, too died of it. He also condemns Ghiyasuddin impaling Tamil victims on sharpened stakes. The last Sultan of Madurai, Alaudin Sikandar Shah's dargah, the Thiruparankuram Dargah, is located in Thiruparankundram, Madurai.

Tamil chronicles like the Madurai Sthaneekar varalaru, the Maduraittalavaralaru, and the Pandiyan Chronicle, provide more information on the temples of this period, subjected to destruction, and their restoration later on. To protect the deity of the Meenakshi temple, the administrators and the workers of the temple constructed a stone wall covering the garbhagriha, and set up another idol in front of it at the ardhamandapa, so that the invaders shall mistake the idol for the original deity, and shall desecrate the same, thus saving the original idol. They also buried other statues (utsava murtis) underground, to recover them later. The invaders destroyed 14 gopurams of the temple, and destructed many parts of the temple; the west gopuram, the sannadhi gopuram, and the inner parts of the temple, including the ardhamandapa, escaped destruction.

== Vijayanagara dynasty and Madurai Nayaks (1371–1736 CE) ==
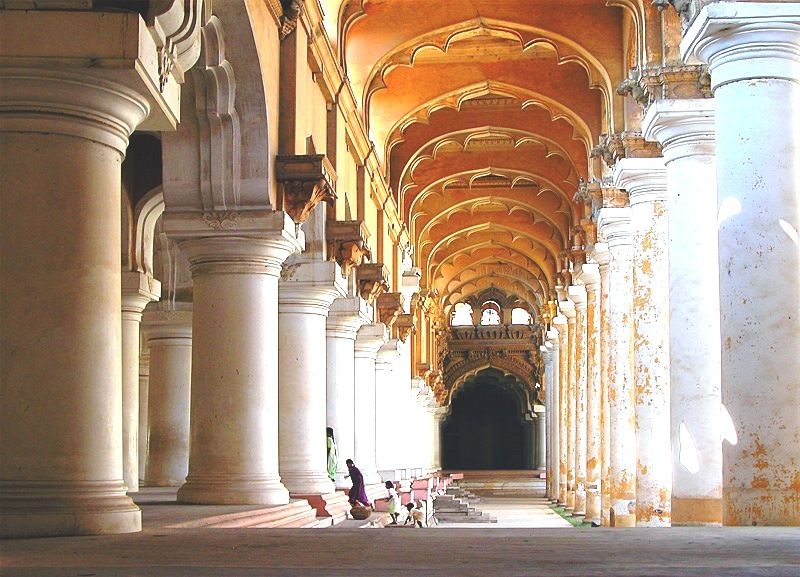
The Thirumalai Nayakkar Mahal at Madurai

Kumara Kampana, the son of Bukka Raya I, led the Vijayanagara forces against the Madurai Sultanate, and overthrew the Sultanate in 1371 CE. He appointed many chiefs known as "nayakkanmars", and himself assumed the title of "udaiyar", the viceroy of Madurai. Successive viceroys were members of the royal family, and this practice continued until the reign of Krishnadevaraya. In 1385 CE, Harihara II appointed his own sons to govern different parts of his empire, for efficient administration of the same, and Virupaksha Raya was appointed as the governor of the southern domains, areas surrounding Madurai. Madurai was also under the governance of the Banas, who were subordinates to the Vijayanagara rulers. The Meenakshi shrine of the Meenakshi Temple was expanded, as traditionally recorded by the "Tiruppani malai", by a Bana king, Tirumalirunjolaininran Māvalivānādarayan, who ruled Madurai, in 1452 CE.

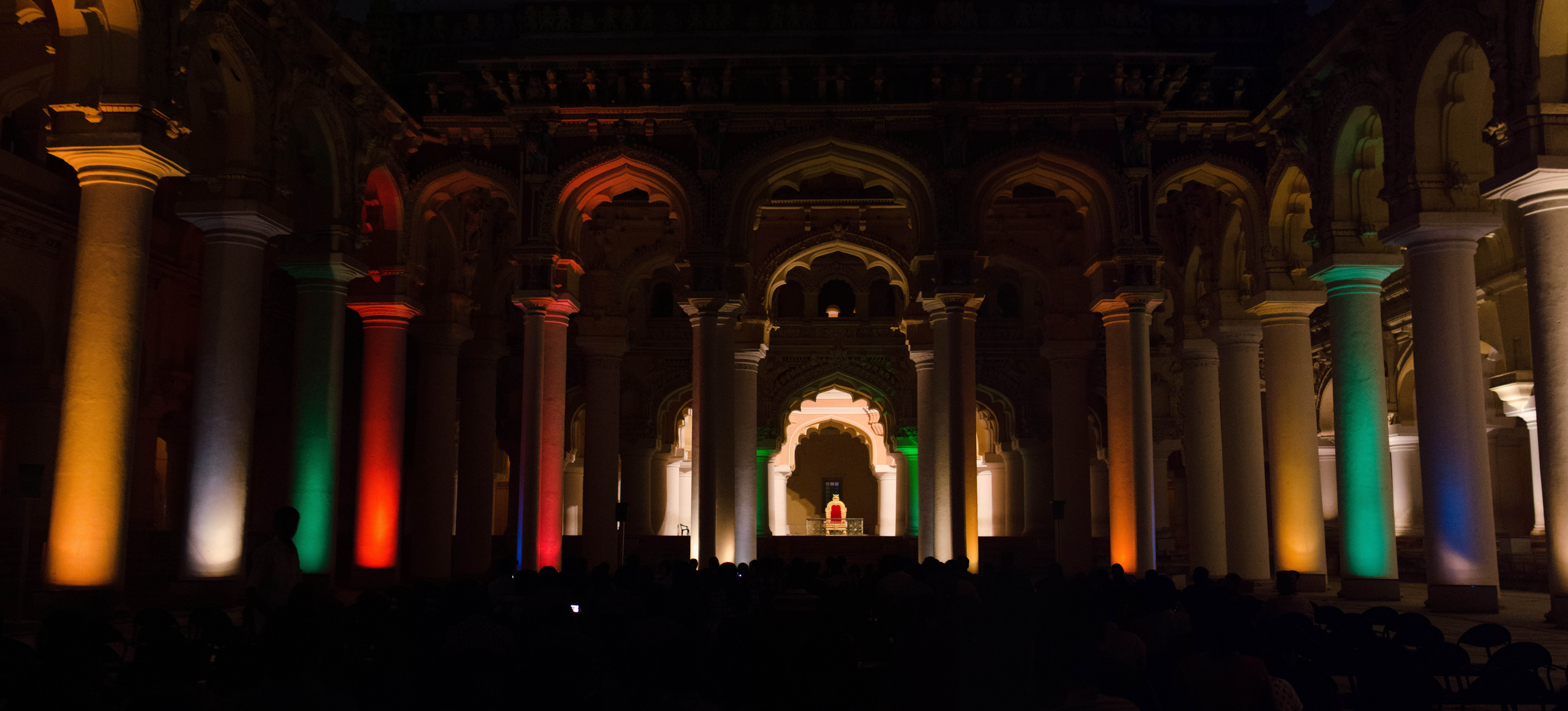
The Thirumalai Nayakkar Mahal, illuminated at night.

After generations of constant changes in governance, Madurai came under the governance of the Nayaks, deputies of the Vijayanagara kings. By 1532 CE, they had started administering Madurai by themselves. The Nayaks ruled over Madurai for over 200 years, with the capital city switching between Madurai and Tiruchirappalli, from around 1532 CE to 1736 CE. The dynasty was noted for its achievements in arts, cultural and administrative reforms, revitalization of temples previously ransacked by the Delhi Sultanate, and the introduction of a new architectural style, the Nayaka style Vijayanagara architecture, epitomized by the Thirumalai Nayakkar Palace. The dynasty consisted of 13 rulers, of whom nine were kings, two were queens, and two were joint-kings. Under the founder Viswanatha Nayak, the king Tirumala Nayaka and the queen Rani Mangammal, the Nayak kingdom reached its height.

=== Tirumala Nayaka and his successors ===
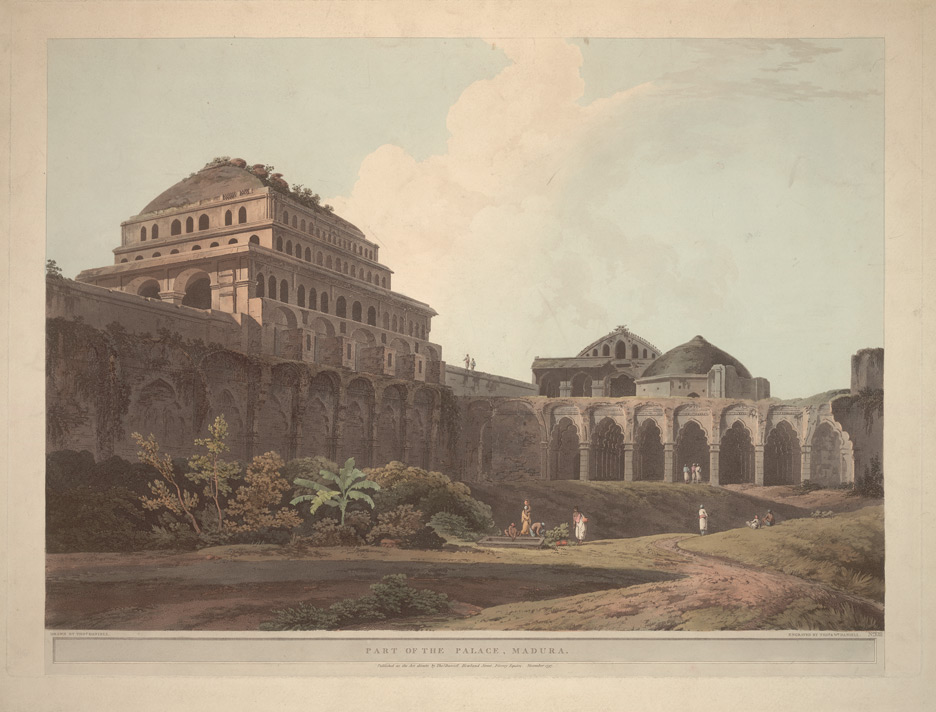
A part of the Thirumalai Nayakkar Mahal (palace) in 1797 CE.

Tirumala Nayaka was initially loyal to Vijayanagara, and was in conflict with Sriranga III later on. This led to resentment on both sides, culminating in Tirumala asserting his freedom. Tirumala made major contributions to art and architecture. In his period, exclusive of the Thirumalai Nayakkar Mahal, many repairs and renovations to the Meenakshi temple, and the construction of the Pudumandapam there, took place. The Nayaks restructured Madurai according to the Shilpa Shastras, and added more concentric streets around the Meenakshi Temple (especially, the Masi streets). The Nayaks also restructured the Chithirai festival to its current form, and Tirumala Nayaka established the annual Tepporchavam festival in the Vandiyur Teppakulam.

In 1637 CE, under the rule of Tirumala Nayaka, Madurai was refortified (its previous fortification being that of the Pandyas), and a moat was dug. Seventy-two bastions were positioned over this fort, and these were assigned to 72 battalions, each of these sending a certain number of troops to guard their bastion. These individual battalions were each assigned to a separate chief, known as a Polygar. These Polygars, feudatories to the Nayaks, later ruled their own domains (palayam) independently, until they were brought under control by the British Raj.

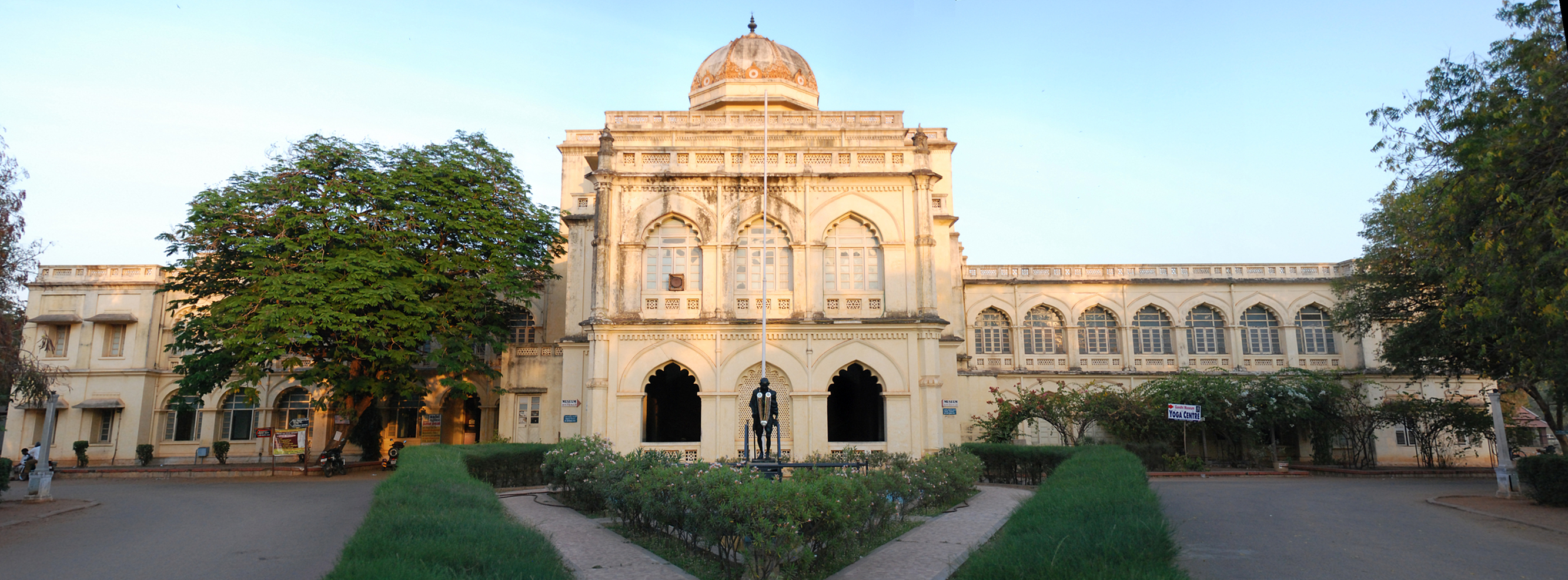
The Gandhi Memorial Museum, which was once the palace of Rani Mangammal.

Rani Mangammal ruled as the regent from 1689 CE to 1706 CE. She had liberal religious views, donating lands to temples and dargahs alike. She initiated the "Unjal tiruvizha", the swinging festival for the deities, at the Meenakshi Temple. She granted endowments and undertook many public works at Madurai. After her death, the Nayaks slowly began losing their power. After internal conflicts took over, Chanda Sahib, sent by the Carnatic Sultanate, took over Madurai, thus ending the Nayaka rule of Madurai.

=== Culture ===
Local autonomy prevailed in this period. Leaders like Viswanatha Nayaka and Tirumala Nayaka developed the public infrastructure. A large immigration of the Telugu people, the Saurashtra people and the Kannada people into Madurai took place under the Vijayanagara rulers and the Nayaks, and cultural assimilation of customs observed by the Kannada people, the Telugu people, the Muslims, the Saurashtrians and the native Tamils came about. A custom of privileges and honour was introduced in this period, considered essential for social ranking, and this custom survives in the modern period in fragments. Females were clad in simple drapings of saree, and the males dressed in plain veshtis (dhotis). Flowers were used for ornamental purposes by women, and men were accompanied by an angavastram. The Madurai Nayaks brought about many reforms, which produced an economic boost in the region. The Nayaks financed the spread of agriculture on black soils. Though red soils were also abundant in the region, cotton was cultivated solely on black soils, in this period, due to the patronage of the Nayaks.

The Vira Kamparaya Saritam, popularly known as Maduravijayam, was written by Gangadevi, the wife of Kumara Kampanna. The text is about Kampana's invasion of Madurai, which she considers to be the liberation of the city from the Sultanate. She says of Madurai under the Sultanate:

[...] I very much lament for what has happened to the groves in Madurai. The coconut trees have all been cut and in their place are to be seen rows of iron spikes with human skulls dangling at the points. [...] In the highways which were once charming with the sounds of anklets of beautiful women, are now heard the ear-piercing noises of Brahmanas being dragged, bound in iron fetters and then beheaded. [...] Yama takes his undue toll of death on what are left of the lives if undestroyed by the [Tughlaqs].

— Gangadevi, translated by Brajadulal Chattopadhyaya, Madhura Vijayam

Other devotional works, including the Tiruvilayadal puranam of Paranjothi, and the Meenakshi pillaitamil by Kumaraguruparar, were written during this period. The development of the cult around Meenakshi, spanning centuries, took its final form in this period, and Meenakshi is still considered to be the mythological tutelary goddess of Madurai.

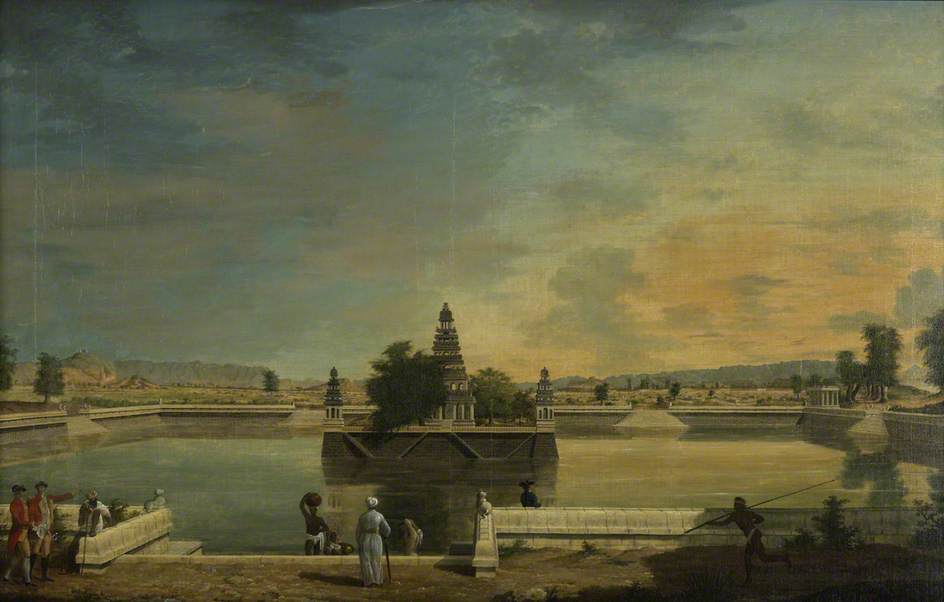
Vandiyur Mariamman Teppakulam, constructed by the Nayaks. Madurai, c. 1772.

== Carnatic Sultanate and the East India Company (1736–1801 CE) ==
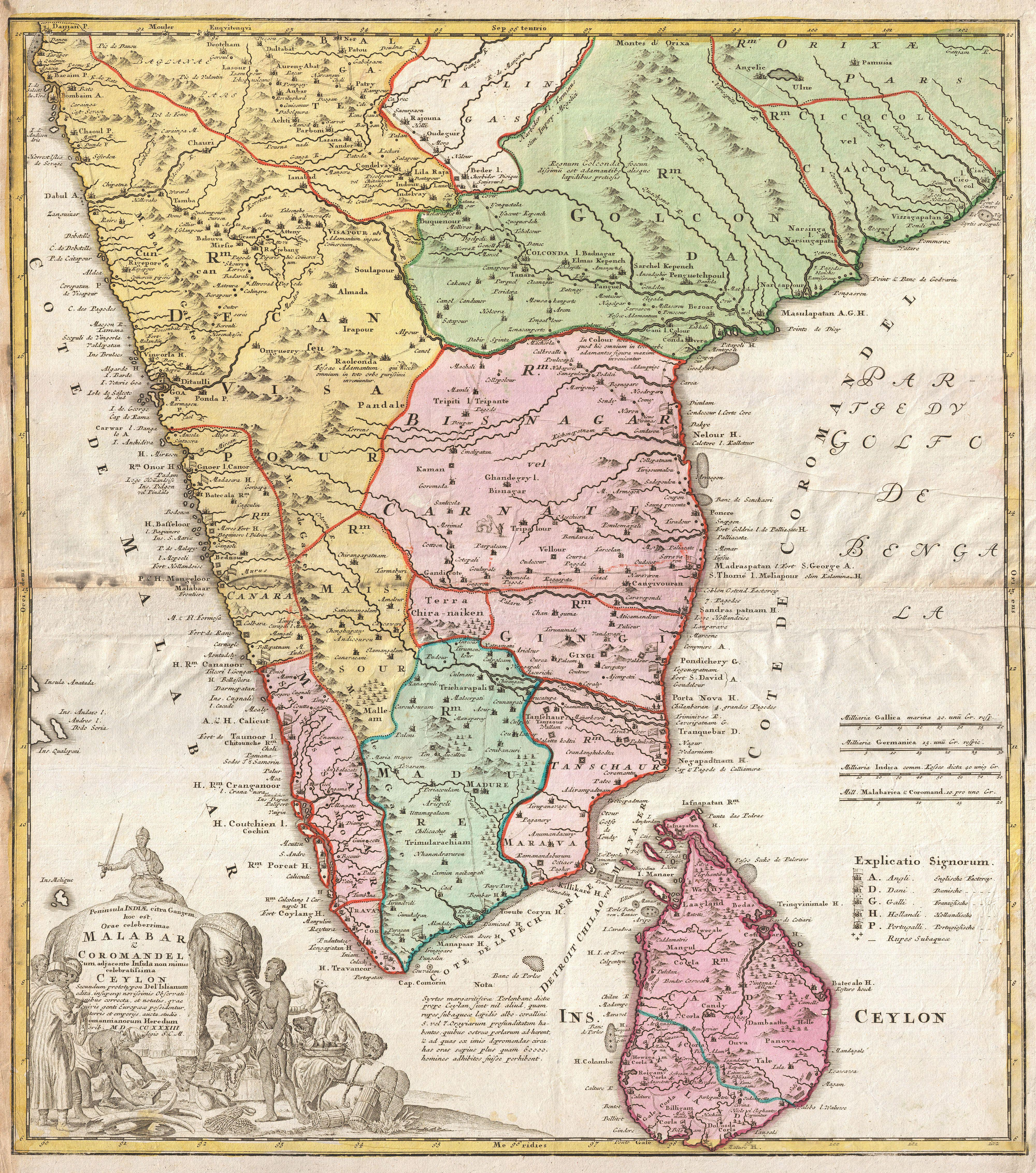
India in 1733 CE. (The Nayak country is shown in green, and the Carnatic Sultanate in pink)

In 1736 CE, the rule of the Nayaks was marked by internal strife and family feuds. The Arcot Nawab sent Chanda Sahib, who captured the Nayaks and took over Madurai for himself. He appointed his brother, Buda Saheb Khan, as the governor of Madurai. In 1741 CE, in the Maratha siege of Tiruchirappalli, Buda Saheb was killed, and Chanda Saheb surrendered to the sieging Marathas. In 1744 CE, the Nawab of Arcot was re-established, with Anwaruddin, Muhammad Ali Khan Wallajah and Chanda Saheb leading the Carnatic Sultanate. Wallajah controlled the south (including Madurai), and Chanda Saheb was in control of the northern parts of the state. The Carnatic wars broke out as a result of the struggle for power between Wallajah and Chanda Sahib, who were supported by the British and the French respectively. This led to an early English presence in Madurai, which was ceded to them in 1801 CE.

By 1749 CE, Madurai was under the control of Abdul Rahim, a brother of Wallajah. In 1751 CE, Wallajah lost Madurai to the forces of Chanda Sahib's followers, and an attempt by the English to recover Madurai for Wallajah turned futile, with vain efforts to breach the fort of Madurai, having encamped at the choultries of the area. After a rapid change of rulers in the Carantic wars, Wallajah sent an expedition under the English and Muhammad Yusuf Khan (popularly known as Maruthanayagam Pillai), in 1755 CE. Wallajah conquered Madurai, and his elder brother, Mahfuz Khan was made the Governor of Madurai. Due to many uprisings in Madurai, Wallajah sent Yusuf Khan (Maruthanayagam) to restore order, and the troops were encamped at Thiruparankundram. Colonel Alexander Heron, the Major of the Garrison, and of the Company's forces on the Indian coast, who was stationed at Tiruchirappalli, assisted Khan in his expedition towards Madurai. The English were interested in Madurai and Palayamkottai, mainly due to the "remarkable" fortresses of these cities. The Madurai fort is described as follows:

[...] Madura itself is situated on the southern bank of the river Vaigai, and formed at this time an irregular square of about one thousand yards. It was surrounded by a stone wall twenty-two feet high with square towers at about every hundred yards. Outside this was a faussebraye thirty feet broad and overgrown with thorny bushes, almost impenetrable; and beyond this a low wall and a deep and wide ditch, the depth of water in which, however, depended very much on the state of the weather. There was no citadel, and the safety of the town accordingly depended entirely upon the walls and ditch and the courage of its defenders [...]

— Samuel Charles Hill, Yusuf Khan: The Rebel Commandant, Chapter IV

=== Sieges of Madurai ===
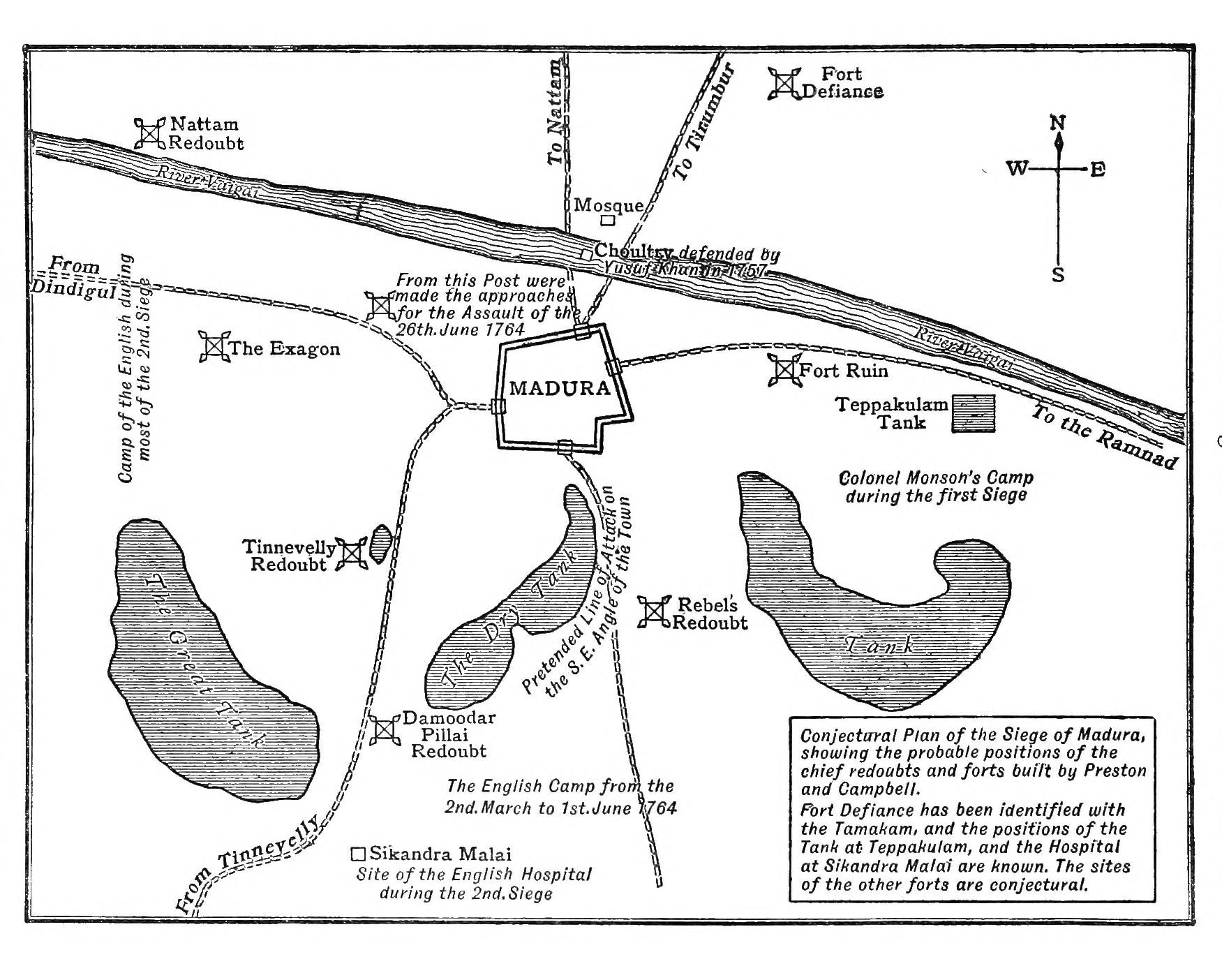
Map of Madurai during the 2nd siege.

On 5 March 1755 CE, the expeditionary forces reached Madurai. After a relatively easier battle, Colonel Heron and Yusuf Khan entered Madurai and plundered the surrounding areas. Around this time, Hyder Ali, who had captured the fort of Dindigul and Sholavandhan, tried to break into Madurai. He was stopped by the fort of the city, and was defeated by Yusuf Khan. By this time, the Polygar wars took form, and the country was in turmoil. Various Polygars, led by Pulithevar and Kattabomman, rebelled against the English, and with violent turns, the area was under the governance of various rulers. In 1759 CE, Madurai was rented to Yusuf, who was under the Nawab and the English. By 1763 CE, he broke his allegiance to them, and joined forces with the French. To put down Yusuf, the English laid their first siege to Madurai, encamped at Teppakulam, and were repulsed. The English suffered heavy losses, yet were keen on capturing Madurai by any means then.

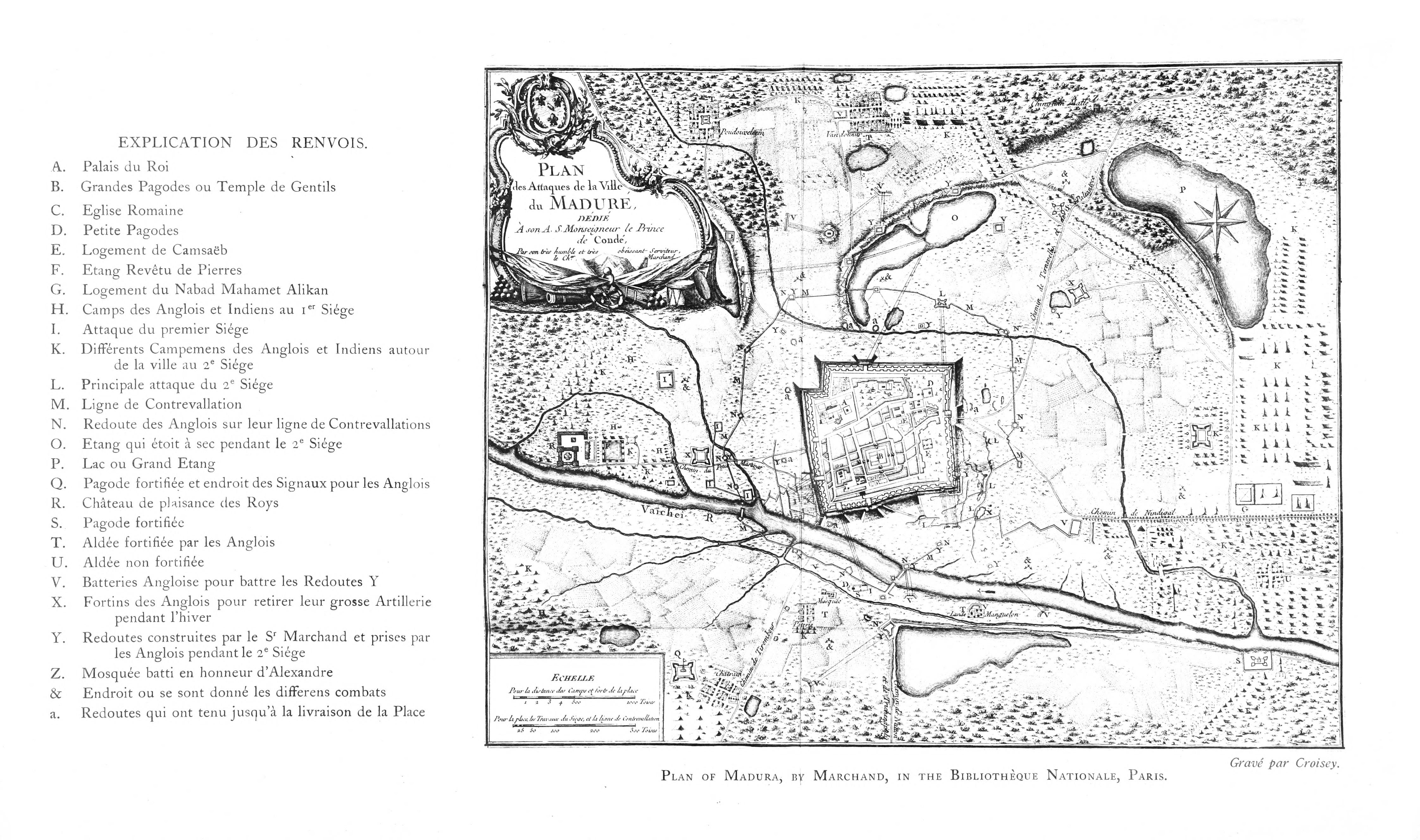
Plan of the 2nd Siege of Madurai. (Down is north)

In 1764 CE, the English laid their second siege to Madurai. A majority of the Company's forces were brought to Madurai, and a contingent was dispatched from Bombay too. By 10 February 1764, the English surrounded Madurai practically on all sides, establishing posts and camps at Thiruparankundram, Tamukkam, Madakkulam, Teppakulam, and many other suburbs of modern-day Madurai. The Commandant of the French troops, Captain Marchand, had been stationed at Madurai in support of Yusuf Khan, against the English. Walter Hamilton describes the conditions at Madurai:

[...] The natives with a few exceptions are miserably poor and their huts of the worst description. The streets are narrow and filled with dirt and rubbish, and the old drains having been choked up the rain stagnates everywhere in pools. Thousands of cattle are kept within the walls, where filth of all sorts accumulates. The fort is also too crowded with trees, which retard evaporation and infect the air with exhalations from their decayed leaves, and the water in the fort tanks, being seldom renewed, becomes putrid and sends forth a deleterious effluvia (sic). [...]

— Walter Hamilton, Description of Hindostan, Volume II

In late April 1764, the English saw their first successes, and after an assault and a blockade, in October 1764, they captured Madurai. Yusuf Khan had struck the French Captain, Marchand, with his riding whip in a quarrel, and in his thirst for revenge, Marchand captured Yusuf Khan and handed them over to the English and the Nawabs, thus effectively ending the siege of Madurai. Madurai came under the Nawabs of Arcot, and the revenue administration was taken care by the English. In 1801 CE, under the Carnatic Treaty, Azim-ud-Daula, the Nawab of Arcot, ceded Madurai to the East India Company. Madurai (then known as Madura) was described by an English Colonel, in 1785, as follows:

Madura [is] bounded by Melur on the east, by the Natham collieries on the north, by the country of Dindigul, belonging to Hyder Ali, on the west, and by Tinnevelly on the south. Its territory is not more than forty-five miles in length and thirty-five miles in breadth, and its annual revenue is diminished to £34,000. [...] Tirumala Nayaka [...] has left monuments of magnificence [...] these proud buildings still remain, a melancholy contrast with present poverty and depopulation. [...] if the works were repaired, this place might be defended against the most powerful Indian enemy. Its vicinity to the country of Dindigul, belonging to Tipu Sultan, renders it a position of capital importance in the event of operations against that power.

— Colonel Fullarton, in James Henry Nelson, The Madura Country: A Manual, Part III, Chapter XI, p. 286

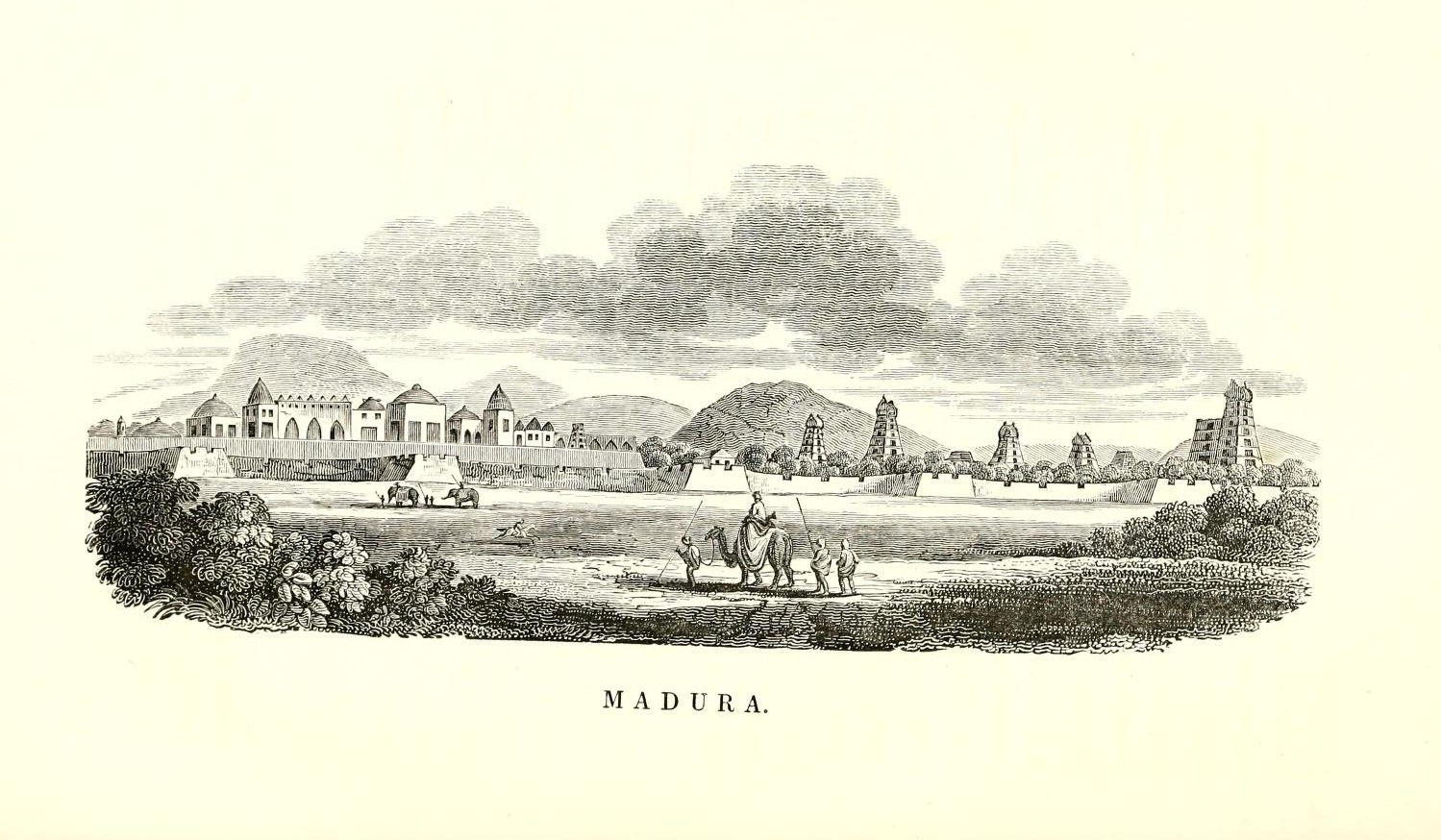
Madurai in 1794 CE. The Madura Fort (surrounding the city), the Meenakshi Temple (in the right), and the Thirumalai Nayakkar Mahal (in the left) are visible in the distance.

== Colonial British rule (1801–1947 CE) ==
=== Company rule and British Raj ===
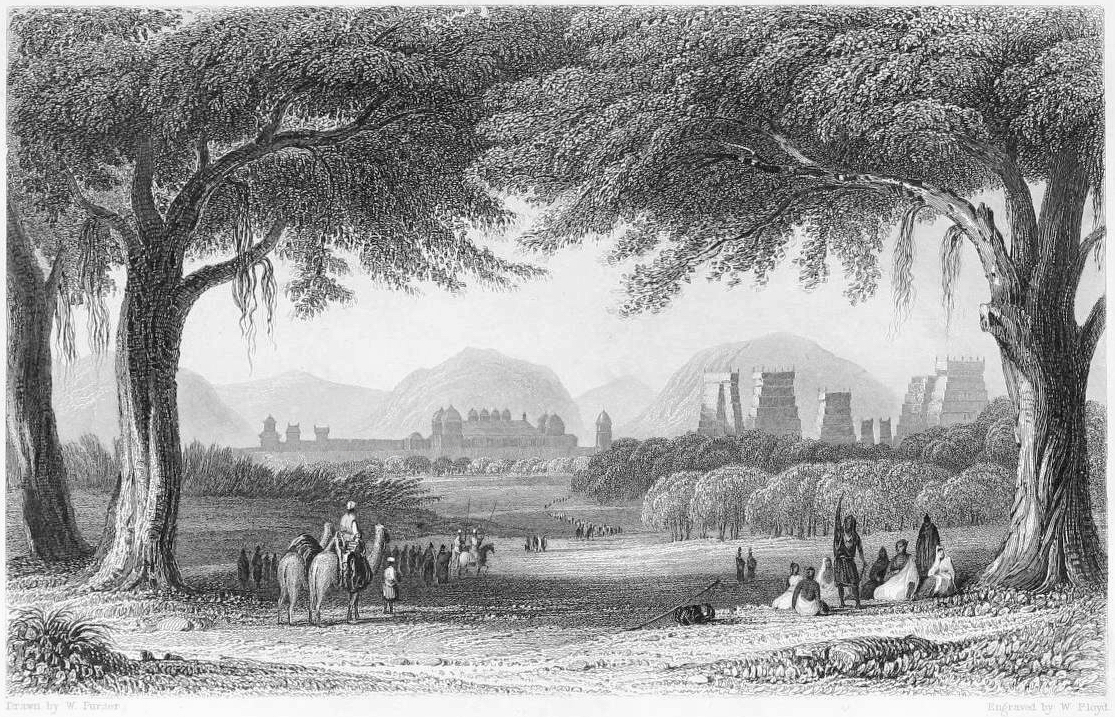
Hand coloured antique wood engraving drawn by W. Purser (1858) shows Madurai city as seen from the north bank of the Vaigai River

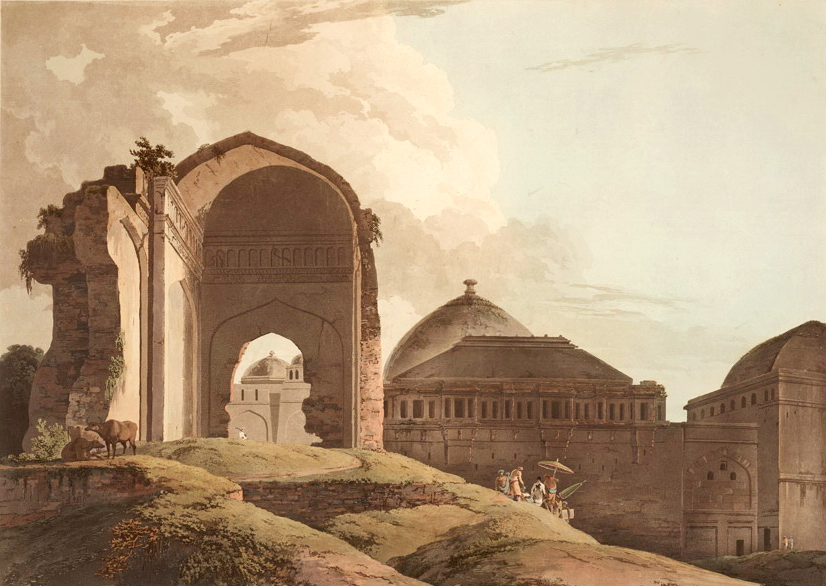
Ruins of the Thirumalai Nayak Palace in Madurai, in 1792.

In 1801, Madurai (then known as Madura) came under the direct control of the British East India Company and was annexed to the Madras Presidency. The British government made donations to the Meenakshi Temple and participated in the Hindu festivals during the early part of their rule. The city evolved as a political and industrial complex through the 19th and 20th centuries to become the district headquarters of the larger Madurai district.

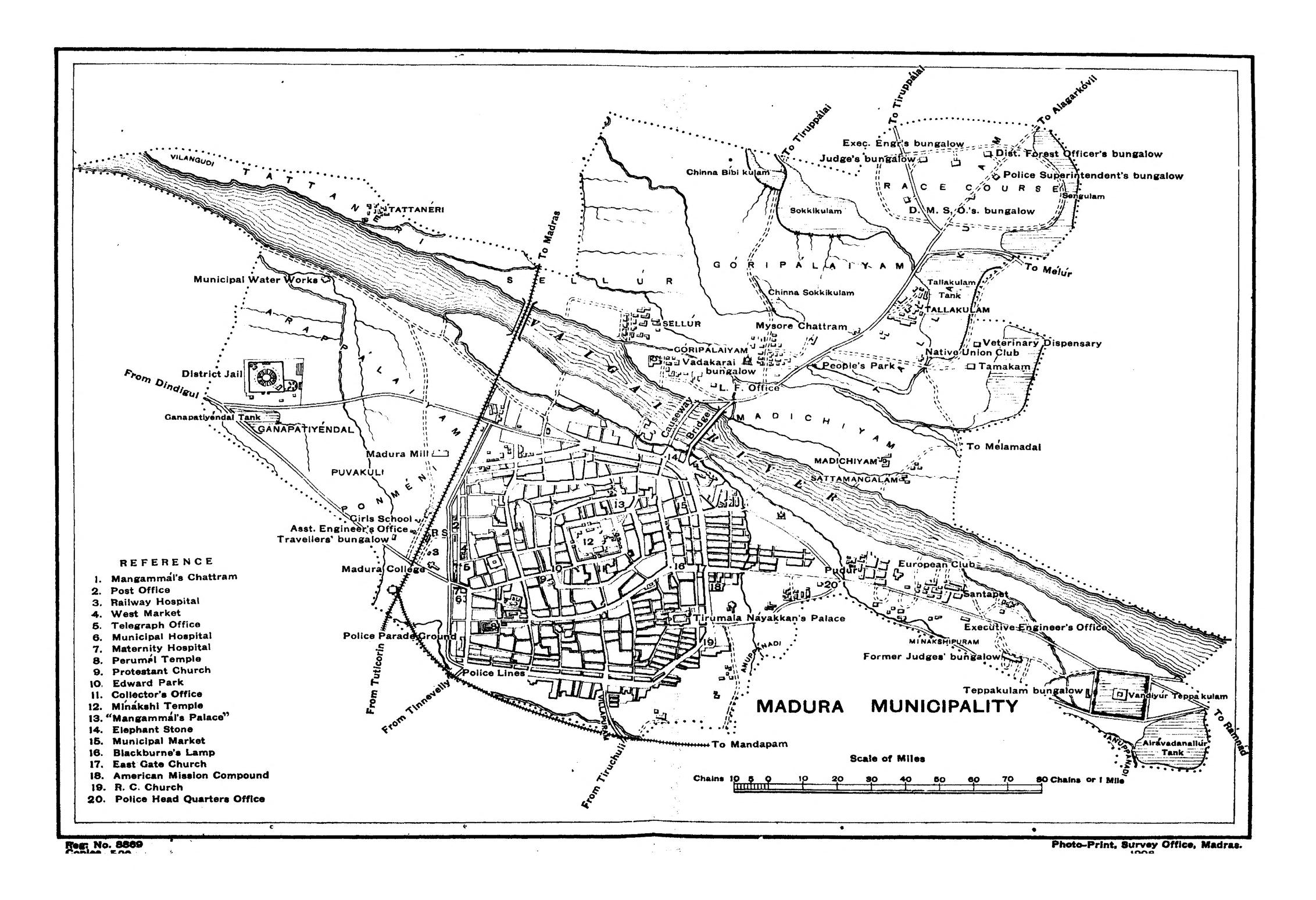
Map of the Madurai Municipality in 1906

In 1836-37, the Pandyan and the Nayaka forts, which had been weakened by constant wars, and were not repaired for decades, started to crumble; the moat was filled up with wastewater. The southern and eastern parts of the city were farms and fields surrounded by plantations and groves. To allow for the expansion of the city, the old fortifications around the city were demolished by the British, under the orders of the then Collector, John Blackburne. To cater for the workforce needed to demolish the fort, the government issued a statement, assuring the native people, that the land under the fort they help to clear up, shall be granted to them. The moat was drained and the debris was used to construct new streets – Veli, Marret and Perumal Maistry streets (the last two named after the Assistant Surveyor of the district and an Indian architect, respectively). Four landmarks of the fort were left: the west gate, the eastern gateway (Vitta vāsal), and two sculptures of the fort's walls - Yanaikkal and Simmakkal, which still remain in the city. The basic plan of the old town was maintained - all the streets emanated from the Meenakshi Temple, with concentric streets around it. The newer, expanded town, was planned and developed in the subsequent centuries. Later on, complexes of houses and shops were erected in the cleared lands.

Owing to the reorganization of the city, roads were enlarged, with the elimination of encroachments. New buildings were built consistently and tightly, without vacant spaces. The northern part of the city became an active market, where goods from the surrounding areas of Madurai were imported into the city. This market still operates in the 21st century, with peasants selling their produce here. Locals of economically richer classes took part in the redevelopment of the city too, funding restoration projects across Madurai. People of the lower castes were systematically pushed out from the city-centre, which, according to the then Collector Blackburne, cleared the issue of overpopulation in the city. Many of these people were relegated to the north-eastern parts of the city, which was prone to the river floods in the Vaigai. These populace still continue to reside in these parts, in the 21st century. These redevelopment projects transformed the city-scape considerably. According to the British geographer Clements Markham, after these projects, Madurai was "the cleanest and the best built city" in India, with wide streets, and bazaars with a strong smell of spices.

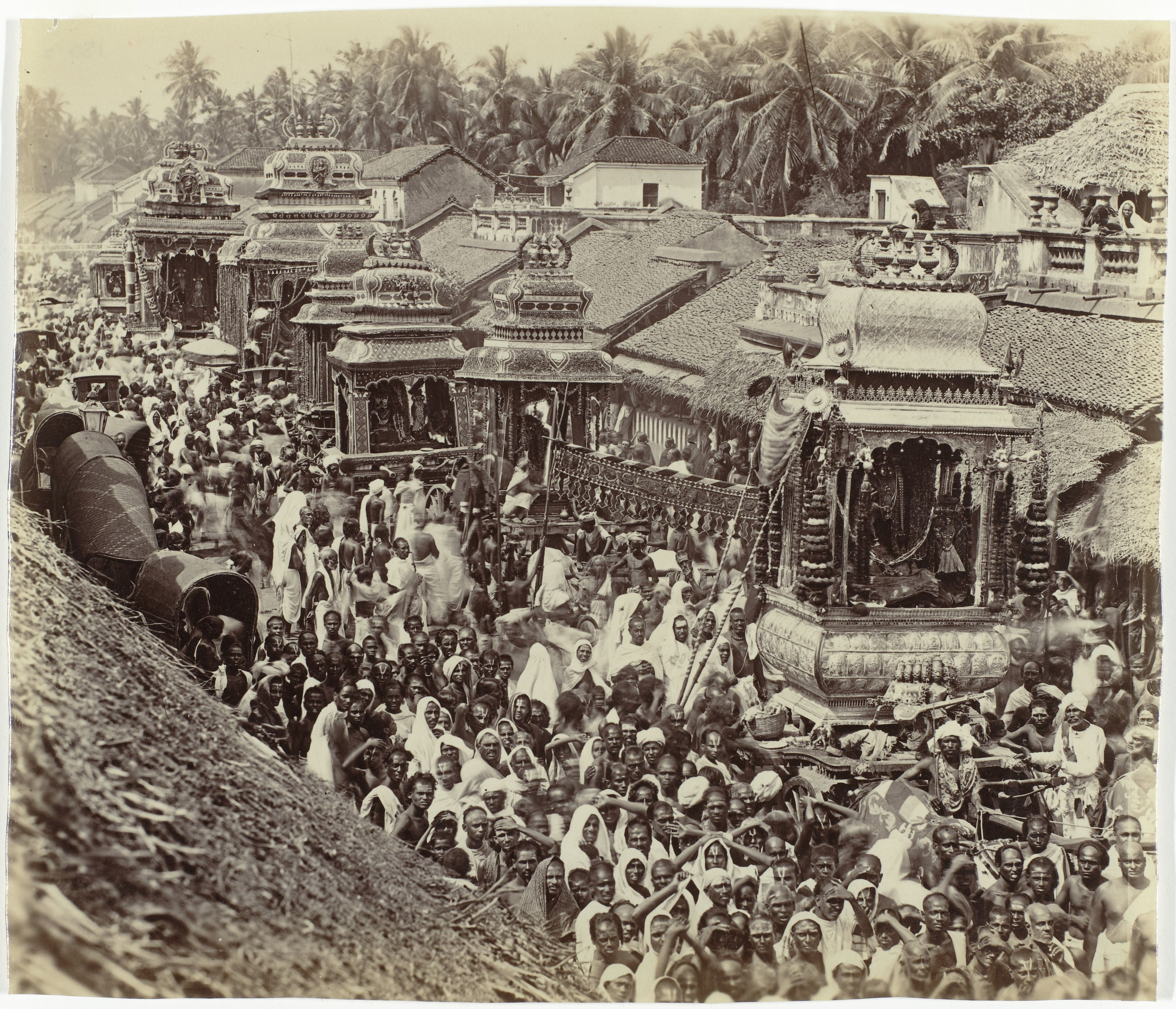
Procession of Nataraja idols in temple cars, Madurai, c. 1870.

The city was constituted as a municipality in 1866 CE. The British government faced initial hiccups during the earlier period of the establishment of municipality in land ceiling and tax collection in Madurai and Dindigul districts under the direct administration of the officers of the government. The city, along with the district, was resurveyed between 1880 and 1885 CE and subsequently, five municipalities were constituted in the two districts and six taluk boards were set up for local administration. Police stations were established in Madurai city, housing the headquarters of the District Superintendent of Madura.

The chief executive and magisterial official of the district of Madura was the Collector-Magistrate. The district had officers concerned with the departments of judiciary (headed by a district judge), land revenue, general administration, agriculture, public works (composed of executive engineers), politics, education, police, forest, medicine, jail, and industries. Madurai city was contained in two taluks: Madurai and Tirumangalam. The district court of Madurai was located at a part of the Thirumala Nayaka palace, and the official residence of the Collector was the Tamukkam palace. Though the British had originally occupied the old city of Madurai in the early 19th century, following the Indian rebellion of 1857 and the construction of the Albert Victor overbridge in 1889, they moved to the northern bank of the Vaigai.

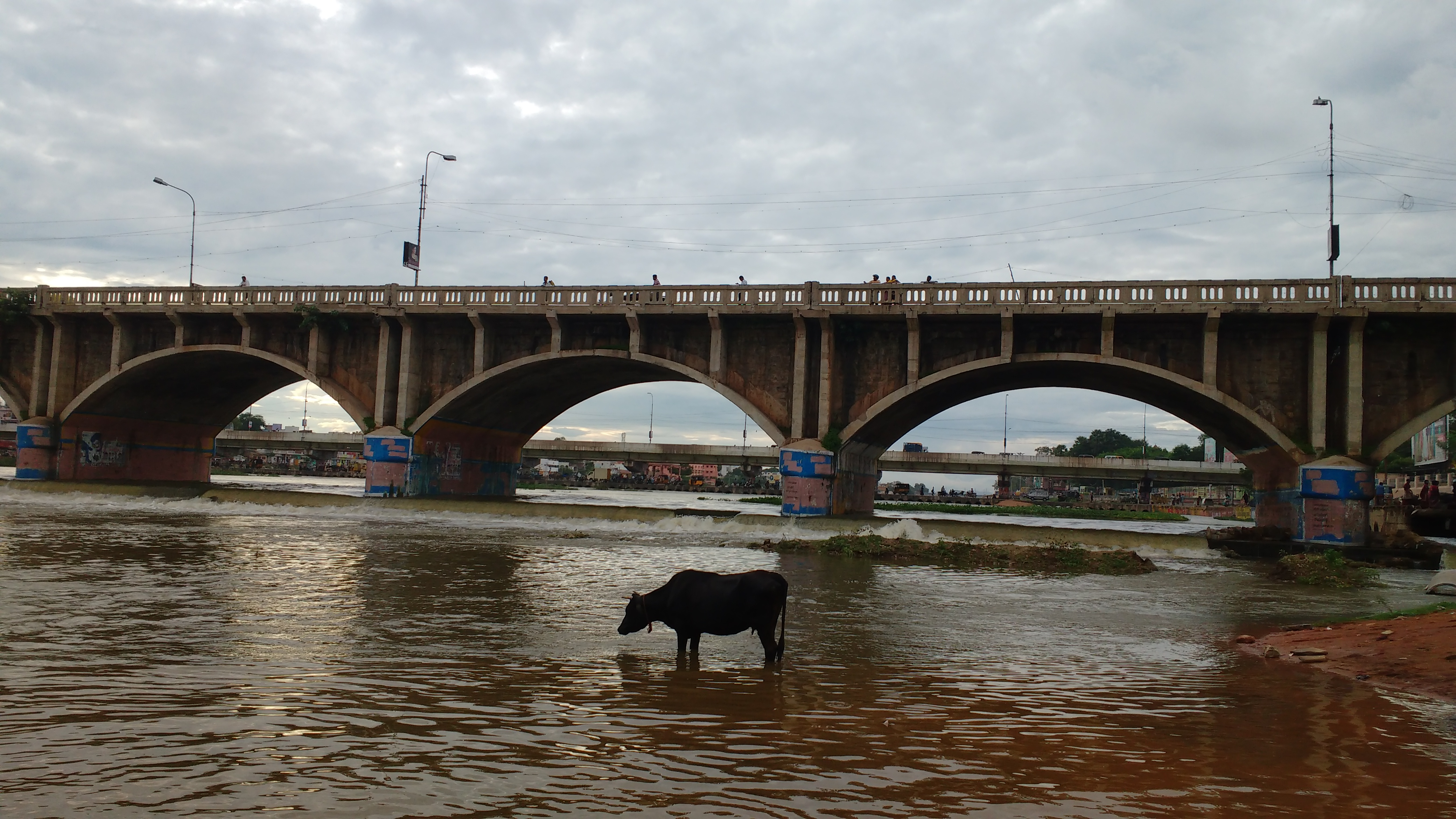
The Albert Victor Overbridge over the Vaigai, opened in 1889.

Industry and trade developed under the British rule. The Harvey mills, better known as the Madura Mills, a cotton spinning mill, was established in 1889 CE, by Scots A & F Harvey brothers. It came to accommodate a large native workforce, in turn boosting the economy of Madurai. In the succeeding years, many other mills were set up in Madurai, turning the city into a textile hub, with weavers constituting a major part of the population, along with farmers. Many other factories, producing food and healthcare products, emerged in the city, too.

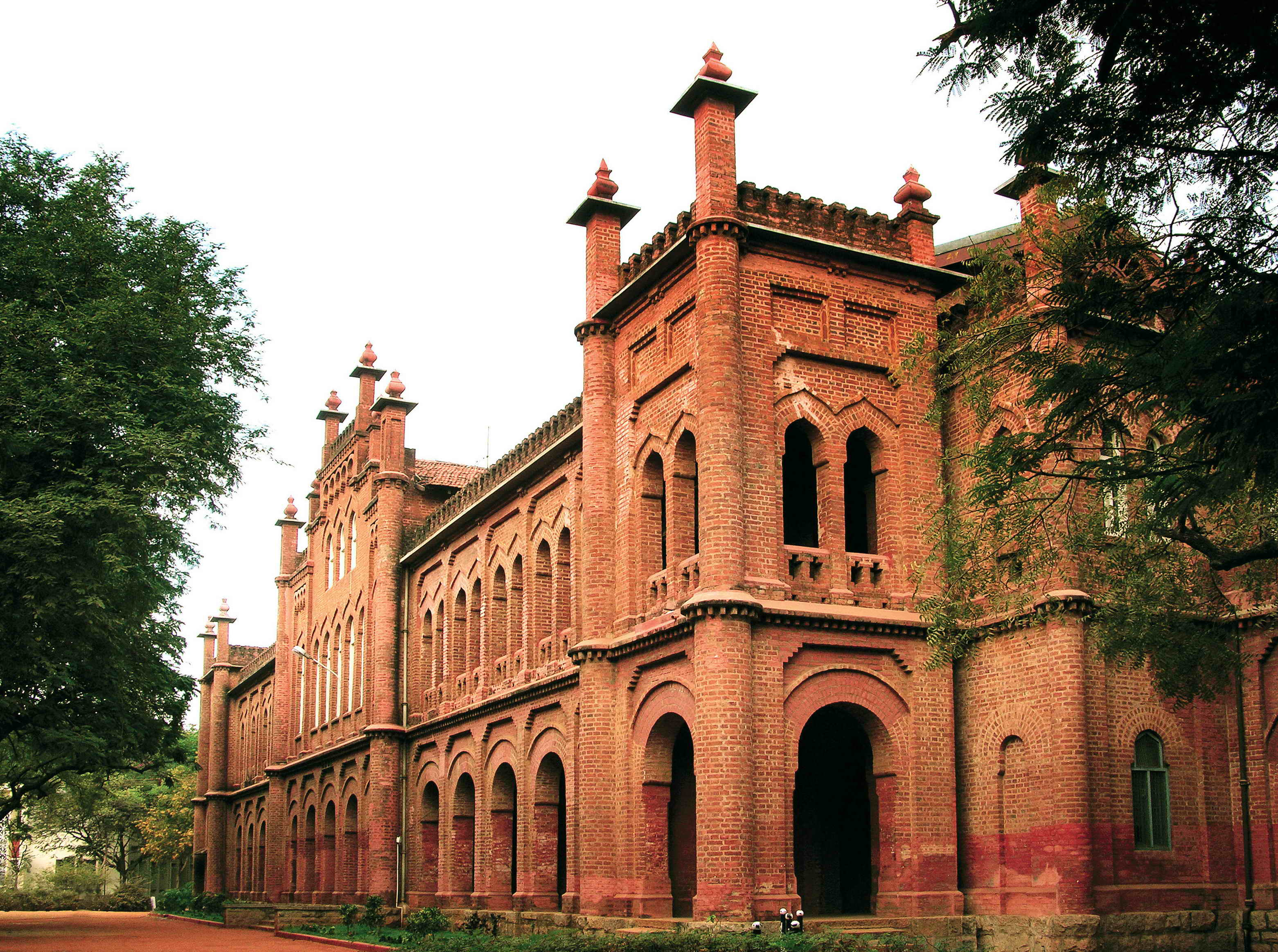
The American College, Madurai, founded in 1881.

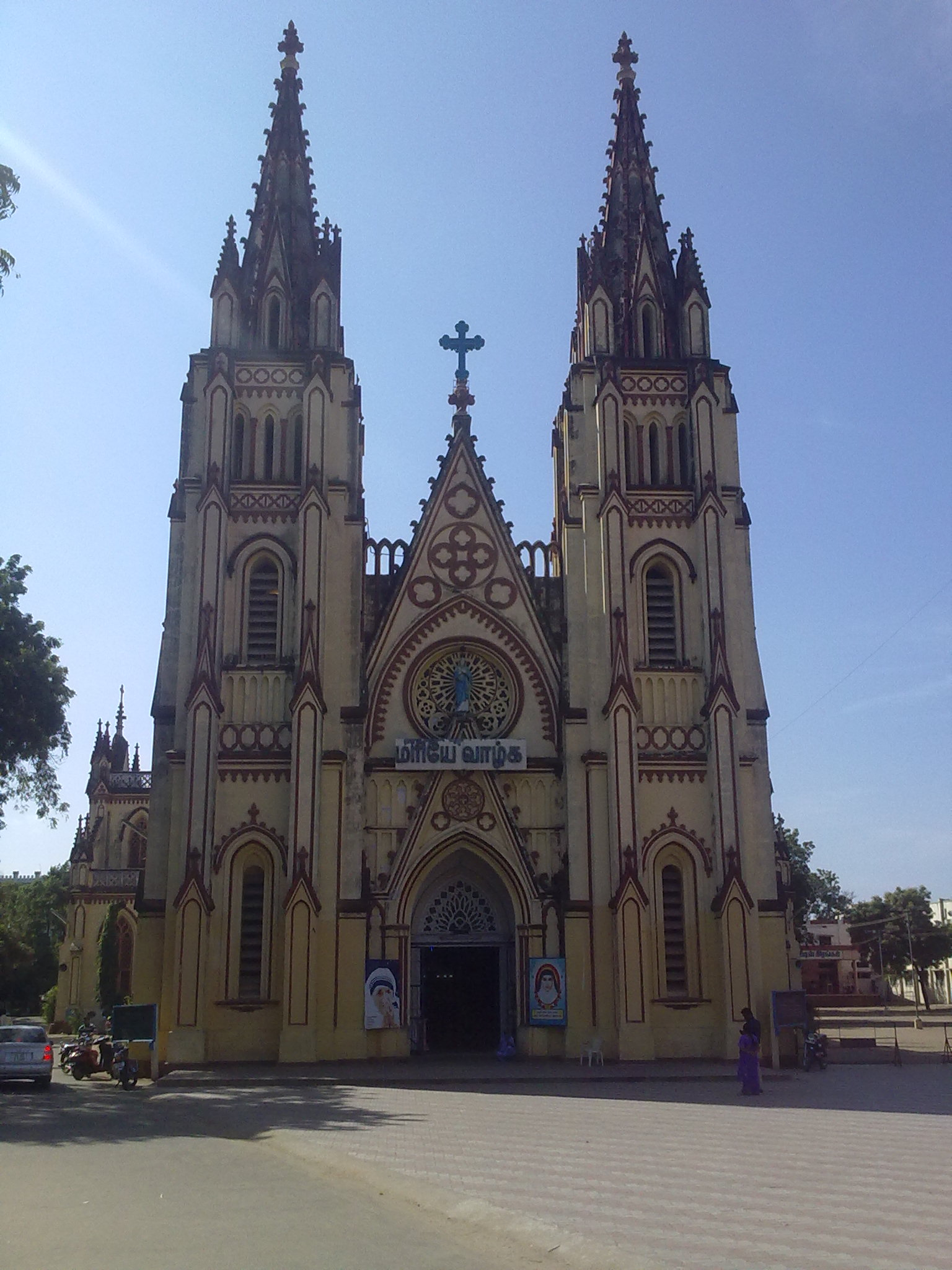
St. Mary's Cathedral, Madurai, built in 1841 CE.

Many educational institutions and missionaries were also set up in the city. The American College was founded in the year 1881 CE. The St. George's English cemetery was established in 1770 CE. In 1842 CE, the Erskines Hospital was founded, which still functions in the city as the Government Rajaji Hospital. The Madura College was established in 1856 CE.

The Madurai Junction railway station was inaugurated in 1875 CE. The Madurai Airport was opened as an aerodrome in 1942 by the Royal Air Force during the Second World War to facilitate the supply of mail and newspapers. The airport became a domestic airport in 1952, under the Government of India.

=== Indian independence movement ===
It was in Madurai, in 1921, that Mahatma Gandhi, pre-eminent leader of Indian nationalism in British-ruled India, first adopted the loin cloth as his mode of dress after seeing agricultural labourers wearing it. Leaders of the independence movement in Madurai included N.M.R. Subbaraman, Karumuttu Thiagarajan Chettiar and Mohammad Ismail Sahib. The Temple Entry Authorization and Indemnity Act passed by the government of Madras Presidency under C. Rajagopalachari in 1939 removed restrictions prohibiting Shanars and Dalits from entering Hindu temples. The temple entry movement was first led in Madurai Meenakshi temple by independence activist A. Vaidyanatha Iyer in 1939.

== Post-independence (1947 CE - present) ==
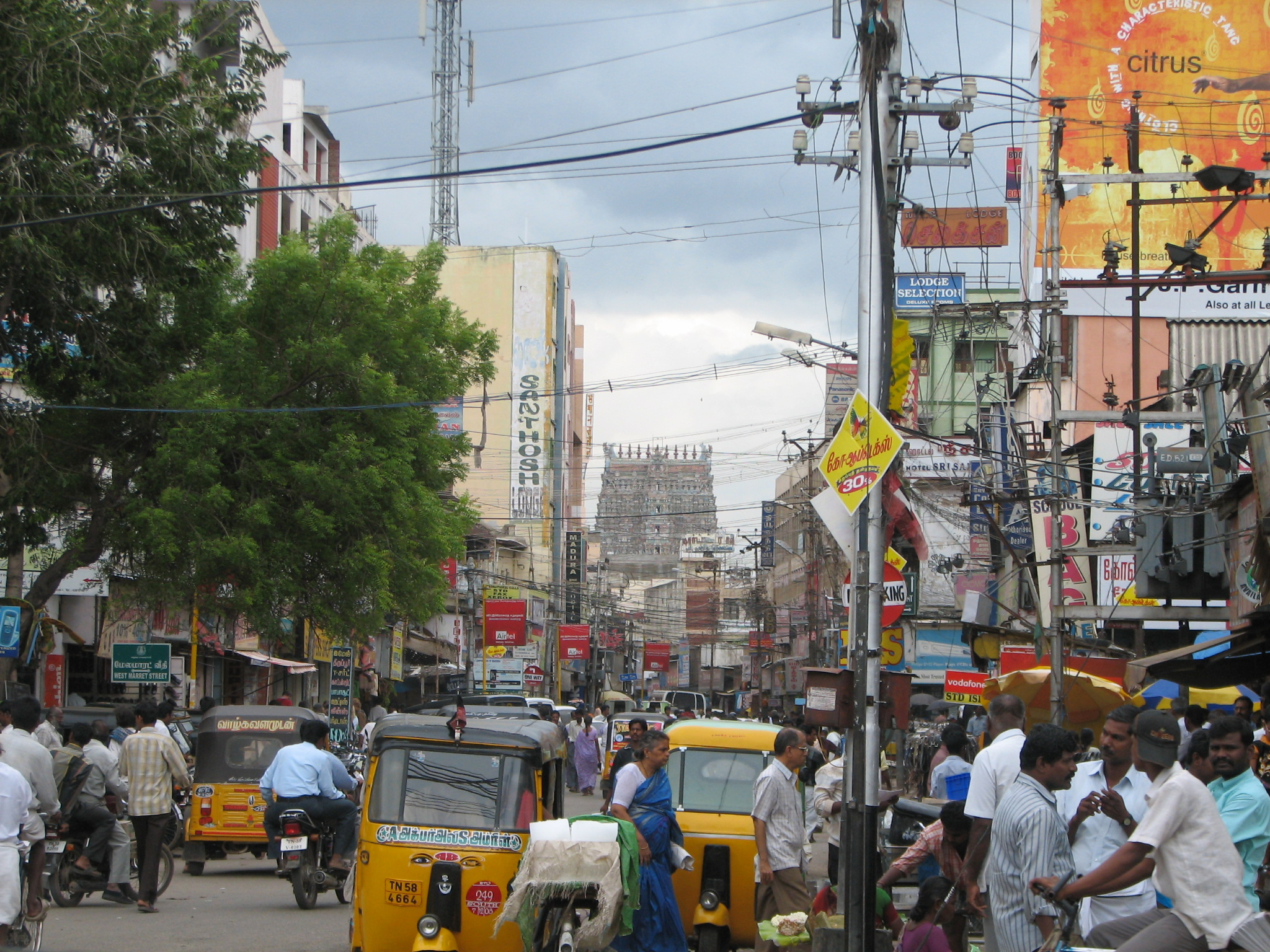
A contemporary street in Madurai.

The Municipality of Madurai was upgraded as the Madurai Municipal Corporation in the year 1971 to account for population increase and administrative extension.

Steps for the refinement of education were undertaken post-independence. The Thiagarajar College was set up in 1949, with the Thiagarajar College of Engineering being established in 1957. The Madurai Medical College was established in 1954, attached to the Government Rajaji Hospital. The Fatima College was established in 1953. The Madurai Kamaraj University was set up in 1966, and the Madurai Law College was established in 1974. The Sourashtra College was opened in 1967.

Historical population
Year	Pop.	±% p.a.
1837	35,400	—
1854	43,000	+1.15%
1862	50,000	+1.90%
1871	51,987	+0.43%
1881	73,807	+3.57%
1891	87,428	+1.71%
1901	105,984	+1.94%
1911	134,130	+2.38%
1921	138,894	+0.35%
1931	182,018	+2.74%
1941	239,144	+2.77%
1951	361,781	+4.23%
1961	458,981	+2.41%
1971	633,989	+3.28%
1981	820,891	+2.62%
1991	940,989	+1.37%
2001	928,869	−0.13%
2011	1,017,865	+0.92%
Source: *: 1837 - 1854: 1862: 1871 - 1891: 1891 - 1901: 1911 - 1941: 1951 – 1981: 1991: 2001: 2011:

== Historical and religious sites ==
- Meenakshi Temple
- Keeladi
- Mangulam
- Gandhi Memorial Museum, Palace of Rani Mangammal
- Samanar Hills, Keelakuilkudi
- Thirumalai Nayakkar Mahal
- Kazimar Big Mosque
- Koodal Azhagar Temple
- Kallalagar Temple, Alagar Kovil
- Goripalayam Dargah
- Subramaniya Swamy Temple, Thiruparankundram
- Vandiyur Mariamman Teppakulam
- Murugan Temple, Pazhamudircholai
- Thiruparankundram Dargah
- Albert Victor Overbridge
- St Mary's Cathedral
- Sacred Heart Shrine, Idaikattur
- Yanaimalai
- Remains of the fort of Madurai: west gate and Vitta Vāsal (eastern gateway).

== See also ==
- History of Tamil Nadu
- Madurai–Mysore Wars
- Sangam literature
- Cilappatikaram
- Legendary Tamil Sangams
- Madurai Tamil
- Pandya Nadu
