= List of Tamil Nadu Government Medical Colleges =

This is a list of medical colleges controlled by the government of Tamil Nadu in the Indian state of Tamil Nadu. All colleges are funded and run by government of Tamil Nadu.There are 46 medical colleges in the state. All of these colleges listed below are affiliated with The Tamil Nadu Dr. M.G.R. Medical University. It includes modern medicine, Dental and AYUSH medical colleges.

In the third phase of the central government sponsored scheme hospital projects, 11 medical colleges at the cost of Rs.325 crore have been sanctioned to Tamil Nadu. On 18 October 2019, permission was given to build 6 medical college hospitals including Tirupur, Nilgiri, Ramanathapuram, Namakkal, Dindigul, Virudhunagar. On 25 November 2019, permission was given to construct 3 medical college hospitals including Krishnagiri, Thiruvallur and Nagapattinam. Also on 13 January 2020, permission was given to construct two medical college hospitals including Ariyalur, Kallakurichi. These colleges were inaugurated by the Prime Minister on 12 January 2022.

== Government Medical Colleges (Modern Medicine) ==
College		Location	District	Established year	No. of Seats (MBBS)	Stream
MMC	Madras Medical College	Park Town	Chennai	1835	250	Modern medicine
SMC	Stanley Medical College and Hospital	Washermanpet	Chennai	1838	250	Modern medicine
MDUMC	Government Madurai Medical College and Rajaji Hospital	Madurai	Madurai	1954	250	Modern medicine
GCMCH	Government Coimbatore Medical College and Hospital	Peelamedu	Coimbatore	1966	200	Modern medicine
TMC	Government Thanjavur Medical College and Hospital	Thanjavur	Thanjavur	1958	150	Modern medicine
GKMC	Kilpauk Medical College and Hospital	Kilpauk	Chennai	1960	150	Modern medicine
GCMCH	Government Chengalpattu Medical College and Hospital	Chengalpattu	Chengalpattu	1965	100	Modern medicine
TVMC	Government Tirunelveli Medical College and Hospital	Palayamkottai	Tirunelveli	1965	250	Modern medicine
GCMCH	Government Cuddalore Medical College and Hospital	Chidambaram	Cuddalore	1985	150	Modern medicine
GEMCH	Government Erode Medical College and Hospital	Perundurai	Erode	1992	100	Modern medicine
KAPVGMCH	K.A.P. Viswanatham Government Medical College and Hospital	Tiruchirappalli	Tiruchirappalli	1997	150	Modern medicine
GMKMCH	Government Mohan Kumaramangalam Medical College and Hospital	Salem	Salem	1986	100	Modern medicine
TKMC	Government Thoothukudi Medical College and Hospital	Thoothukudi	Thoothukudi	2000	150	Modern medicine
KGMC	Kanyakumari Government Medical College and Hospital	Nagercoil	Kanyakumari	2001	150	Modern medicine
GTMC	Government Theni Medical College and Hospital	Theni	Theni	2004	100	Modern medicine
GVMC	Government Vellore Medical College and Hospital	Vellore	Vellore	2005	100	Modern medicine
GDMCH	Government Dharmapuri Medical College and Hospital	Dharmapuri	Dharmapuri	2008	100	Modern medicine
GTMCH	Government Thiruvarur Medical College and Hospital	Thiruvarur	Thiruvarur	2010	150	Modern medicine
GVMCH	Government Villupuram Medical College and Hospital	Mundiyampakkam	Villupuram	2010	100	Modern medicine
GSMC	Government Sivagangai Medical College and Hospital	Sivagangai	Sivaganga	2012	100	Modern medicine
GTVMMC	Government Tiruvannamalai Medical College and Hospital	Thiruvannamalai	Thiruvannamalai	2013	100	Modern medicine
	Government ESIC Medical College & PGIMSR	Chennai	Chennai	2013	250	Modern medicine
	Government Medical College (Omandurar Government Estate) and Tamil Nadu Government Multi Super Speciality Hospital	Triplicane	Chennai	2015	100	Modern medicine
	Government Medical College & ESI Hospital	Singanallur	Coimbatore	2016	100	Modern medicine
GPMCH	Government Pudukkottai Medical College and Hospital	Pudukottai	Pudukottai	2017	150	Modern medicine
GKMCH	Government Karur Medical College and Hospital	Karur	Karur	2019	150	Modern medicine
GNMCH	Government Namakkal Medical College and Hospital	Namakkal	Namakkal	2021	150	Modern medicine
GTMCH	Government Tiruppur Medical College and Hospital	Tiruppur	Tiruppur	2021	150	Modern medicine
GTMCH	Government Tiruvallur Medical College and Hospital	Tiruvallur	Tiruvallur	2021	100	Modern medicine
GRMCH	Government Ramanathapuram Medical College and Hospital	Ramanathapuram	Ramanathapuram	2021	100	Modern medicine
GAMCH	Government Ariyalur Medical College and Hospital	Ariyalur	Ariyalur	2021	150	Modern medicine
GNMCH	Government Nagapattinam Medical College and Hospital	Nagapattinam	Nagapattinam	2021	150	Modern medicine
GDMCH	Government Dindigul Medical College and Hospital	Dindigul	Dindigul	2021	150	Modern medicine
GKMCH	Government Kallakurichi Medical College and Hospital	Kallakurichi	Kallakurichi	2021	150	Modern medicine
GVMCH	Government Virudhunagar Medical College and Hospital	Virudhunagar	Virudhunagar	2021	150	Modern medicine
GKMCH	Government Krishnagiri Medical College and Hospital	Krishnagiri	Krishnagiri	2021	150	Modern medicine
GNMCH	Government The Nilgiris Medical College and Hospital	Udhagamandalam	Nilgiris	2021	150	Modern medicine

== Government Medical College (DENTAL & Physiotherapy) ==
College		Location	District	Established year	No. of Seats (BDS)	Stream
TNDCH	Tamil Nadu Government Dental College and Hospital	Broadway	Chennai	1953	100	Dental
GCDCH	Government Cuddalore Dental College and Hospital	Chidambaram	Cuddalore	1980	100	Dental
GDCP	Government Dental College, Pudukkottai and Hospital	Pudukkottai	Pudukkottai	2023	100	Dental
GCPT	Government College of Physiotherapy, Trichy	Tiruchchirappalli	Tiruchchirappalli	1988	25	Physiotherapy
GIRM	Government Institute of Rehabilitation Medicine, Chennai	Chennai	Chennai	1979		Physiotherapy, Orthopedic, Prosthetic

== Government Medical Colleges (AYUSH) ==
College		Location	District	Established year	No. of Seats	Stream
GYNMCH	Government Yoga and Naturopathy Medical College and Hospital	Arumbakkam	Chennai	2000	60	Yoga and Naturopathy
IIYNMS	International Institute of Yoga and Naturopathy Medical Sciences	Chengalpet	Chengalpet	2020	100	Yoga and Naturopathy
GUMCH	Government Unani Medical College and Hospital	Arumbakkam	Chennai	1979	60	Unani
GSMCH	Government Siddha Medical College and Hospital	Arumbakkam	Chennai	1985	60	Siddha
GSMCH	Government Siddha Medical College and Hospital	Palayamkottai	Tirunelveli	1964	100	Siddha
GAMCH	Government Ayurveda Medical College and Hospital	Nagercoil	Kanyakumari	2009	60	Ayurveda
GHMCH	Government Homoeopathic Medical College and Hospital	Thirumangalam	Madurai	1975	50	Homoeopathy

== Yearwise Total Numbers of Medical colleges and seats in Tamilnadu ==
Sources:

- Note: including private colleges

Year	Medical colleges	Seats (MBBS)
2013-14	45	6215
2014-15	45	5915
2017-18	49	6850
2022-23	71	10825
2023-24	74	11600
2024-25	75	12050
