= Alur =

Alur may refer to:

== Places in India ==
=== Andhra Pradesh ===
- Alur, Kurnool, a mandal in Kurnool district
  - Alur (Assembly constituency)
- Alur, a village in Anantapur district
- Alur, a village in Rangareddi district
- Alur, a village in Nizamabad district

=== Karnataka ===
- Alur, Hassan, a taluk in Hassan district
- Alur, Bagalkot
- Alur (K.M.), a village in Belgaum district
- Alur, a village in Kundapura taluk
- Alur, a village in Chamarajanagar taluk
- Alur, a village in Hiriyur taluk, Chitradurga district
- Alur, a village in Jevargi taluk, Kalaburagi district

=== Kerala ===
- Alur, Kerala, a village in Thrissur district

=== Maharashtra ===
- Alur, Nanded, a panchayat village in Deglur Taluka, Nanded district
- Alur, Osmanabad, a panchayat village in Umarga Tahsil, Osmanabad district

=== Tamil Nadu ===
- Alur, Tamil Nadu, a town in Kanniyakumari district

== Other uses ==
- Alur people, of Uganda and the Democratic Republic of the Congo
- Alur language, the language spoken by the Alur people
- Mithu Alur (born 1943), disability rights activist
- Rajeev Alur, professor of computer sciences at University of Pennsylvania

== See also ==
- Aloor (disambiguation)
