= Park Inn (disambiguation) =

Park Inn by Radisson, formerly Park Inn or Park Inn International, is a multi-national hotel chain that originates from the United States.

It may also refer to the following notable subjects:

== Hotels ==
- Park Inn Hotel, a historic hotel in Mason City, not part of the hotel chain
- Park Inn by Radisson Berlin Alexanderplatz, a hotel of the Park Inn hotel chain in Berlin, Germany, also known as Park Inn Berlin-Alexanderplatz
- Radha Park Inn, former name of Radha Regent Hotel, Chennai, a hotel of Radha Hotels chain

== Media ==
- The Last Wright: Frank Lloyd Wright and the Park Inn Hotel, a documentary film about the Mason City's Park Inn Hotel.

== See also ==
- Park Inn Hotel stabbings, 2020 stabbing attack in Glasgow, Scotland
- Green Park Inn, a historic hotel, named after Green Park
- South Park Inn, an emergency homeless shelter, named after South Park
- The Omni Grove Park Inn
- Dog Bark Park Inn
- Inn on the Park
- Park Inn (restaurant), the oldest restaurant in Spokane, Washington.
