= Government Yoga and Naturopathy Medical College and Hospital =

Educational institution in India

Tamilnadu State Government Naturopathy Medical College & Hospital
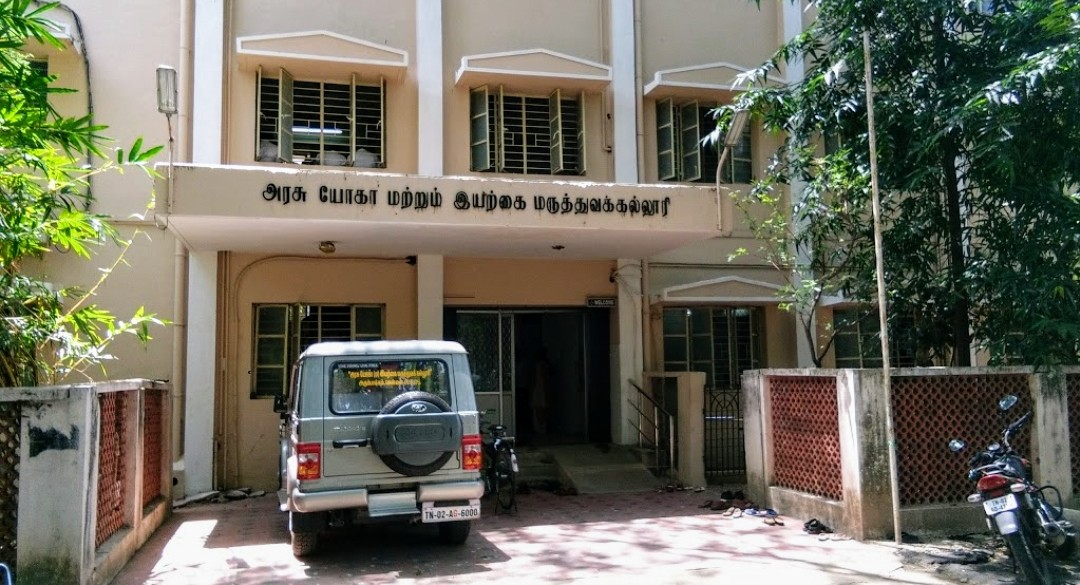
- Type: Naturopathy Medical College
- Established: 2000
- Affiliations: The Tamil Nadu Dr. M.G.R. Medical University & National Institute of Naturopathy, Pune.
- Dean: Prof.Dr.N.Manavalan, MD., PhD.,
- Management: Department of Health and Family Welfare, Government of Tamil Nadu
- Undergraduates: 60
- Postgraduates: 15
- Location: Arumbakkam, Tamil Nadu, Chennai - 600106.
- Campus: Urban
- Website: www.gynmc.com

The Tamil Nadu State Government Naturopathy Medical College and Hospital (GNMCH) is an educational institution attached to a hospital located in Chennai, Tamil Nadu, India.

== History ==
The Institute was established in the year 2000 and conducts a medical degree course in naturopathy and yoga including one year's internship.

The college is owned by the government of Tamil Nadu. In 2015, it began offering postgraduate programs.

== Emblem ==
The official emblem of the college has a yoga pose, rising of sun and some herbals.

Yoga pose that placed in emblem is Vrischikasana (which denotes scorpion like posture) and Yoga is integral part of Naturopathy.

Rising of sun denotes the Heliotherapy (method of treatment in Naturopathy).

Herbals denote the Herbal Medicine and Diet Therapy in Naturopathy treatments.

== Administration ==
The college is guided by National Institute of Naturopathy, Pune which is run by the government of India. The head of the institution is principal N. Manavalan
