= Mary Poonen Lukose =

Indian doctor; first female Surgeon General in world

- Born: 30 July 1886; Aymanam, Kottayam, Travancore, British Indian Empire
- Died: 2 October 1976 (aged 90); Thiruvananthapuram, Kerala, India
- Occupations: Gynecologist, obstetrician
- Known for: Medical service
- Spouse: K. K. Lukose
- Children: 2
- Awards: Padma Shri; Vaidyasasthrakusala

Mary Poonen Lukose (2 August 1886 – 2 October 1976) was an Indian gynecologist, obstetrician and the first female Surgeon General in India. She was the founder of a Tuberculosis Sanatorium in Nagarcoil and the X-Ray and Radium Institute, Thiruvananthapuram, served as the head of the Health Department in the Princely State of Travancore and was the first woman legislator of the state. The Government of India awarded her the fourth highest Indian civilian award of Padma Shri in 1975.

== Early life and education ==
Mary Poonen was born to a rich Anglican Syrian Christian family as the only child on 2 August 1886 in Aymanam—a small village later made famous by being the setting of the novel The God of Small Things— in the princely state of Travancore (modern day Kerala), in the British Indian Empire. Her father, T. E. Poonen, was a medical doctor, the first medical graduate in Travancore and the Royal Physician of Travancore state. Her mother had health issues due to which Mary was brought up by British governesses. She completed her schooling at Holy Angel's Convent High School, Thiruvananthapuram and topped the matriculation examination. However, she was denied admission for science subjects at the Maharajas College, Thiruvananthapuram (present day University College Thiruvananthapuram) for being a woman and had to pursue studies in history on which she graduated (BA) in 1909.

As Indian universities did not offer admission to women for medicine, she moved to London and secured MBBS from the London University.She continued in the UK to obtain MRCOG (gynecology and obstetrics) from Rotunda Hospital, Dublin and underwent advanced training in pediatrics at the Great Ormond Street Hospital. Later she worked in various hospitals in the UK and simultaneously pursued music studies to pass the London Music Examination.

== Medical career ==
Dr Mary Poonen returned to India in 1916, the year her father died. She took up the post of an obstetrician at the Women and Children Hospital, at Thycaud in Thiruvananthapuram and also worked as the superintendent of the hospital, replacing a westerner who had returned to her native place after marriage. Poonen's initial appointment was blocked as the role had traditionally been occupied by European staff, although this was overturned and she was paid on the same salary as European staff. A year later, she married lawyer Kunnukuzhiyil Kurivilla Lukose (K. K. Lukose) She went by the name Dr Mary Poonen Lukose following her marriage. During her tenure at Thycaud Hospital, she initiated a midwifery training program for the children of local midwives in order to win over their support and delivered her own first born child, Grace, at the hospital in 1918. She performed the first Caesarian section in Travancore before 1920, often operating under the light of hurricane lamps.

In 1922 she was nominated to the legislative assembly of Travancore, known as Sree Chitra State Council, becoming the first woman legislator in the state. Two years later, she was promoted as the Acting Surgeon General of the state of Travancore, making her the first woman to be appointed as the surgeon general in India. She continued at the hospital till 1938 during which time she was nominated to the state assembly continuously till 1937. In 1938, she became the Surgeon General, in charge of 32 government hospitals, 40 government dispensaries and 20 private institutions. She is considered to be the first woman appointed as a surgeon general in the world. The first woman surgeon general in the US was appointed only in 1990.

Lukose was one of the founders of the Thiruvananthapuram chapter of the Young Women's Christian Association (YWCA) and became its founder president in 1918, a position she retained till 1968. She served as the Chief Commissioner of the Girl Guides in India and was also a founder member of the Indian Medical Association and the Federation of Obstetric and Gynaecological Societies of India (FOGSI), which started as Obstetric and Gynaecological Society. As the surgeon general of the state, she is reported to have founded the Tuberculosis Sanatorium in Nagarcoil, one of the first sanatoriums in India, which later grew to become the Kanyakumari Government Medical College. She also founded the X-Ray and Radium Institute in Thiruvananthapuram.

== Personal life ==
In 1917 Mary Poonen married Kunnukuzhiyil Kurivilla Lukose (K. K. Lukose), a Malankara Orthodox Syrian Christian lawyer who would later become a judge of the High Court of Travancore. She nicknamed him Judgie. They had two children, the eldest, Dr Grace Lukose (1919-1954), a medical doctor and assistant Professor of Surgery at Lady Hardinge Medical College, New Delhi, who died in her mid 30s in an accident, trying to free a relation whose hair had become entangled in an electric fan. The youngest, son K. P. Lukose, grew up to become a consul general, permanent representative of India to the United Nations and the Indian ambassador to Bulgaria. Her husband died in 1947 and her two children also preceded her in death. She died on 2 October 1976 at the age of 90.

== Recognition and commemoration ==
She was a recipient of the title, Vaidyasasthrakusala, from Chithira Thirunal Balarama Varma, the last Maharaja of Travancore. The Government of India awarded her the civilian honour of Padma Shri in 1975.

A biography Trailblazer – The Legendary Life and Times of Dr Mary Poonen Lukose, Surgeon General of Travancore edited by Leena Chandran was published in 2019.

== See also ==
- Kanyakumari Government Medical College

== Notes ==
- Modern Kerala: Studies in Social and Agrarian Relations, K.K.N.Kurup. p. 86. K.K.N.Kurup. p. 86. mittal publications. 1988. pp. K.K.N.Kurup. p. 86. states that first women doctor and surgeon of Kerala is Dr. Ayathan Janaki Ammal, Ayathan Janaki is the first Malayali lady doctor and surgeon of Kerala, First female doctor and surgeon of Kerala, and also the first female doctor from thiyya community.(Dr. Ayathan Janaki Ammal). please refer modern Kerala and history of Kerala.
- Dr. Ayyathan Gopalan, Malayalam Memoir (2013); V.R.Govindhanunni, Kozhikode. Dr. Ayyathan Gopalan, edited by V.R.Govindhanunni. Mathrubhumi books.
- Gopalan, Kausallya (1932). Kausallya Gopalan (1932) Biography written by Vagbhatananda guru. published by Mathrubhumi Press, Calicut in 1932.
- Ente ammayude ormadaykk (1901) Biography of Kallat Chiruthammal. Calicut: DR.Ayathan Gopalan., Spectator press. 1901.
- Malabar Manual. william logan. 1951.
