= Tamil Nadu Dr. M.G.R. Medical University =

Government medical university centered in Chennai, Tamil Nadu

- Other name: TNMGRMU
- Motto: Health for All
- Type: Public
- Established: 24 September 1987; 39 years ago
- Affiliations: UGC
- Chancellor: Governor of Tamil Nadu
- Vice-Chancellor: Dr. S. T. Radhiga (I/C)
- Location: 69, Anna Salai, Guindy, Chennai, Tamil Nadu, 600032, India; 13.0099°N 80.2182°E
- Campus: Urban
- Language: English
- Website: https://www.tamilnadumgrmedicaluniversity.com/

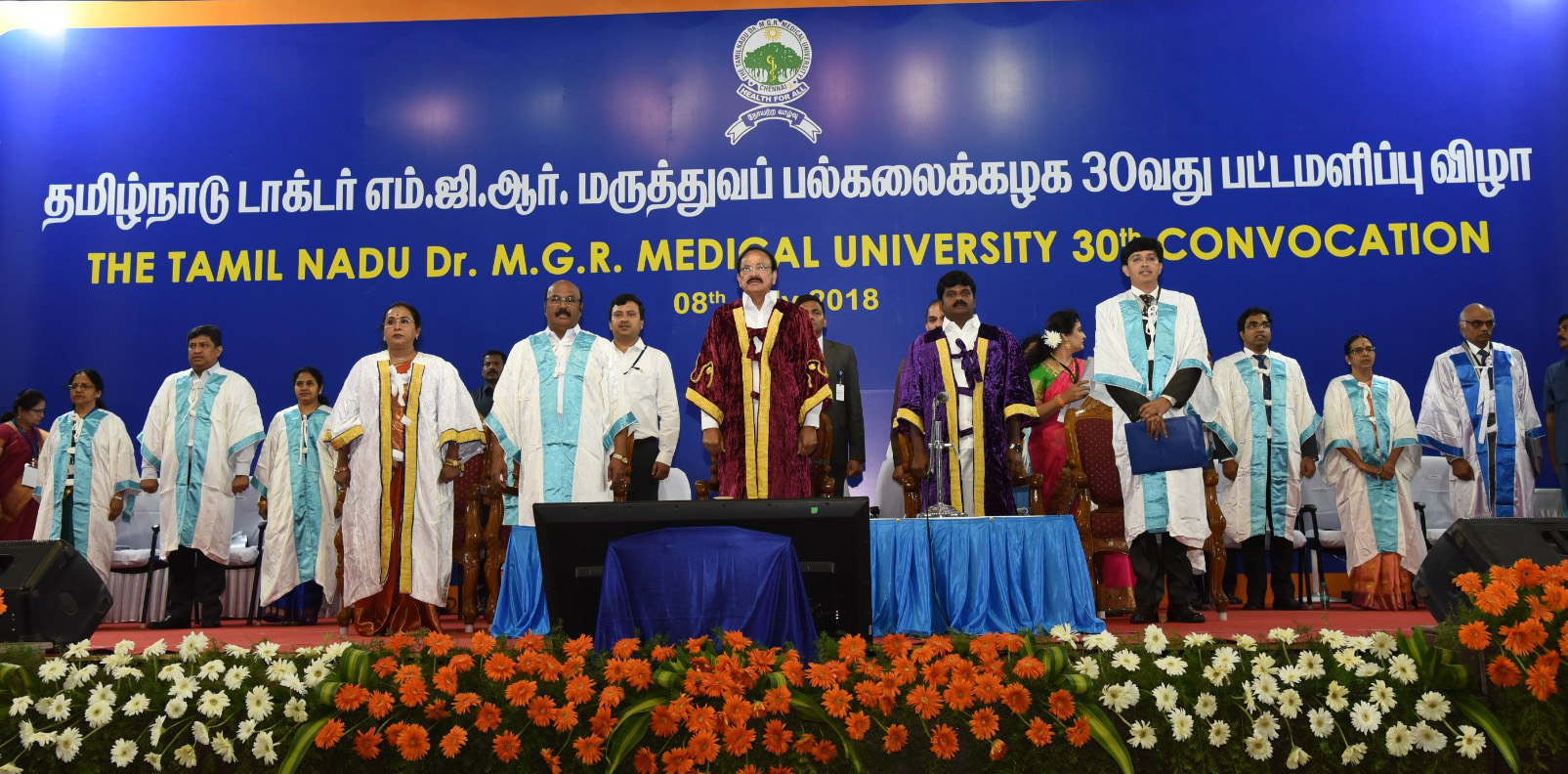
The Vice President, Shri M. Venkaiah Naidu at the 30th Convocation of Tamil Nadu Dr. M.G.R. Medical University, in Chennai.

The Tamil Nadu Dr. M.G.R. Medical University (TNMGRMU) is a government medical university situated in Chennai, Tamil Nadu, India. It is one of the premier medical universities in India, named after the former Chief Minister of Tamil Nadu M. G. Ramachandran, and it is the second largest health sciences university in India.

== History ==
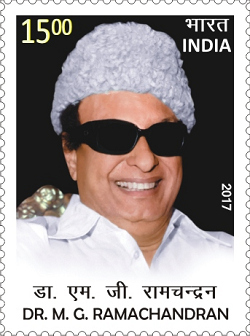
Dr. M.G. Ramachandran
Former Chief Minister of Tamil Nadu

On 5 July 1983, the members of the high-level committee, consisting of S. Arumugam, M. Natarajan, and S. Kameswaran, submitted the proposals to the chief minister of Tamil Nadu M. G. Ramachandran (M.G.R.), in the presence of the minister for health and family welfare of Tamil Nadu H. V. Hande, to start a separate medical university in Tamil Nadu.

On 24 September 1987, the Tamil Nadu Medical University Act, 1987, received the assent of the president of the Republic of India R. Venkataraman. This affiliated university started functioning in July 1988 and is governed by the said act. In 1991, chief minister of Tamil Nadu M. Karunanidhi named the university after the former chief minister of Tamil Nadu M. G. Ramachandran (M.G.R.), through The Tamil Nadu Dr. M.G.R. Medical University, Chennai Act, 1987.

The Tamil Nadu Dr. M.G.R. Medical University is the only medical university in Tamil Nadu capable of granting affiliation to new medical and paramedical colleges, government- or self-financed, and awarding degrees. Until 1988, all degrees in health sciences in Tamil Nadu were awarded by the University of Madras.

== Administration ==
The chancellor and pro-chancellor of the university are the governor and the minister for health and family welfare of Tamil Nadu, respectively. The vice-chancellor is the main academic officer and administrator in the everyday functioning of the university and is appointed by the Government of Tamil Nadu.

== Future ==
The university is planning to set up a 500-bed hospital on four acres of land on the outskirts of the Raj Bhavan campus, with 300 beds set to be installed in the first year.

== List of vice-chancellors ==
No.	Name	Term in office		
No.	Name	Assumed office	Left office	Time in office
1	Lalitha Kameswaran	12 July 1988	12 July 1992	4 years, 0 days
2	B. P. Rajan	27 July 1992	21 January 1996	3 years, 178 days
3	D. Raja	22 January 1996	22 January 1999	3 years, 0 days
4	K. Ananda Kannan	23 January 1999	7 February 2002	3 years, 15 days
5	C. V. Bhirmanandham	8 February 2002	27 July 2006	4 years, 169 days
6	K. Meer Mustafa Hussain	27 November 2006	27 November 2009	3 years, 0 days
7	N. Mayil Vahanan	11 December 2009	11 December 2012	3 years, 0 days
8	D. Shantharam	12 December 2012	13 December 2015	3 years, 1 day
9	S. Geethalakshmi	28 December 2015	28 December 2018	3 years, 0 days
10	Sudha Seshayyan	29 December 2018	31 December 2022	4 years, 2 days
11	K. Narayanasamy	29 May 2023	31 May 2026	3 years, 2 days
–	S. Pushkala (I/C)	1 June 2026	18 November 2026	170 days
–	S. T. Radhiga (I/C)	19 November 2026	Incumbent	1 day

== Affiliated private medical colleges ==
S.No	College name	Location	District	Established year	No. of Seats(MBBS)	Stream
1	Christian Medical College	Thorapadi	Vellore	1900	100	Allopathy
2	PSG Institute of Medical Sciences & Research	Peelamedu	Coimbatore	1985	150	Allopathy
3	Sree Mookambika Institute of Medical Sciences	Kulasekaram	Kanyakumari	2006	100	Allopathy
4	Melmaruvathur Adhiparasakthi Institute of Medical Sciences and Research	Melmaruvathur	Kancheepuram	2008	150	Allopathy
5	Karpaga Vinayaga Institute of Medical Sciences & Research Center	Maduranthakam	Chengalpattu	2009	100	Allopathy
6	Trichy SRM Medical College Hospital & Research Centre	Irungalur	Tiruchirapalli	2008	150	Allopathy
7	Sri Muthukumaran Medical College	Mangadu	Chennai	2009	150	Allopathy
8	Tagore Medical College & Hospital	Vandalur	Chennai	2010	150	Allopathy
9	Dhanalakshmi Srinivasan Medical College & Hospital	Siruvachur	Perambalur	2011	150	Allopathy
10	Madha Medical College & Hospital	Thandalam	Chennai	2011	150	Allopathy
11	Annapoorna Medical College & Hospital	Veerapandi	Salem	2011	150	Allopathy
12	Karpagam Faculty of Medical Sciences & Research	Othakalmandapam	Coimbatore	2012	150	Allopathy
13	Velammal Medical College Hospital & Research Institute	Velammal Village	Madurai	2012	150	Allopathy
14	KMCH Institute of Health Sciences and Research	Coimbatore	Coimbatore	2019	150	Allopathy
15	Panimalar Medical College Hospital & Research Institute	Poonamallee	Chennai	2020	200	Allopathy

== Government Medical Colleges (Allopathy) ==
S.No	College name	Location	District	Established year	No. of Seats(MBBS)	Stream
01	Madras Medical College and Rajiv Gandhi General Hospital	Broadway	Chennai	1835	250	Allopathy
02	Stanley Medical College and Hospital	Washermanpet	Chennai	1938	250	Allopathy
03	Kilpauk Medical College and Hospital	Kilpauk	Chennai	1960	150	Allopathy
04	Government Medical College (Omandurar Government Estate) and Tamil Nadu Government Multi Super Speciality Hospital	Triplicane	Chennai	2015	100	Allopathy
05	Government Chengalpattu Medical College and Hospital	Chengalpattu	Kanchipuram	1965	100	Allopathy
06	Government Dharmapuri Medical College and Hospital	Dharmapuri	Dharmapuri	2008	100	Allopathy
07	Government Madurai Medical College and Rajaji Hospital	Madurai	Madurai	1954	250	Allopathy
08	K.A.P.Viswanatham Government Medical College and Hospital	Trichy	Trichy	1997	150	Allopathy
09	Government Thanjavur Medical College and Hospital	Thanjavur	Thanjavur	1958	150	Allopathy
10	Government Mohan Kumaramangalam Medical College and Hospital	Salem	Salem	1986	100	Allopathy
11	Government Thoothukudi Medical College and Hospital	Thoothukudi	Thoothukudi	2001	150	Allopathy
12	Kanyakumari Government Medical College and Hospital	Nagercoil	Kanyakumari	2001	150	Allopathy
13	Government Vellore Medical College and Hospital	Adukkamparai	Vellore	2005	100	Allopathy
14	Government Tiruvannamalai Medical College and Hospital	Thiruvannamalai	Thiruvannamalai	2013	100	Allopathy
15	Government Karur Medical College and Hospital	Karur	Karur	2019	150	Allopathy
16	Government Theni Medical College and Hospital	Theni	Theni	2004	100	Allopathy
17	Government Coimbatore Medical College and Hospital	Peelamedu	Coimbatore	1966	150	Allopathy
18	Government Tirunelveli Medical College and Hospital	Palayamkottai	Tirunelveli	1965	250	Allopathy
19	Government Sivagangai Medical College and Hospital	Melavaniyankudi	Sivagangai	2012	100	Allopathy
20	Government Thiruvarur Medical College and Hospital	Thiruvarur	Thiruvarur	2010	100	Allopathy
21	Government Villupuram Medical College and Hospital	Mundiyampakkam	Villupuram	2010	100	Allopathy
22	Government Pudukkottai Medical College and Hospital	Pudukottai	Pudukottai	2017	150	Allopathy
23	Government Dindigul Medical College and Hospital	Dindigul	Dindigul	2021	150	Allopathy
24	Government Namkkal Medical College and Hospital	Namakkal	Namakkal	2008	150	Allopathy
25	Government Ramanathapuram Medical College and Hospital	Ramanathapuram	Ramanathapuram	2008	150	Allopathy
26	Government Virudhunagar Medical College and Hospital	Virudhunagar	Virudhunagar	2008	150	Allopathy
27	Government Ooty Medical College and Hospital	Ooty	Nilgiris	2008	150	Allopathy
28	Government Tiruppur Medical College and Hospital	Tiruppur	Tiruppur	2008	150	Allopathy
29	Government Krishnagiri Medical College and Hospital	Krishnagiri	Krishnagiri	2008	150	Allopathy
30	Government Nagapattinam Medical College and Hospital	Nagapattinam	Nagapattinam	2022	150	Allopathy
31	Government Thiruvallur Medical College and Hospital	Thiruvallur	Thiruvallur	2009	150	Allopathy
32	Government Ariyalur Medical College and Hospital	Ariyalur	Ariyalur	2009	150	Allopathy
33	Government Kallakurichi Medical College and Hospital	Kallakurichi	Kallakurichi	2009	150	Allopathy
34	Government Erode Medical and Hospital	Perundurai	Erode	1992	100	Allopathy
35	Government Cuddalore Medical College	Chidambaram	Cuddalore	1985	150	Allopathy

== Government Medical Colleges (Dental) ==
S.No	College name	Location	District	Established year	No. Of seats(BDS)	Stream
36	Tamil Nadu Government Dental College and Hospital	Broadway	Chennai	1953	100	Dental
37	Government Cuddalore Dental College and hospital	Chidambaram	Cuddalore	1980	100	Dental

== Government Medical Colleges (AYUSH) ==
S.No	College name	Location	District	Established year	No. Of seats(BNYS)	Stream
38	Government Yoga and Naturopathy Medical College and Hospital	Arumbakkam	Chennai	2000	60	Yoga and Naturopathy
39	Government Unani Medical College and Hospital	Arumbakkam	Chennai	1979	60	Unani
40	Government Siddha Medical College and Hospital	Arumbakkam	Chennai	1985	60	Siddha
41	Government Siddha Medical College and Hospital	Palayamkottai	Tirunelveli	1964	100	Siddha
42	Government Siddha Medical College and Hospital	Palani	Palani	2018	-	Siddha
43	Government Ayurveda Medical College and Hospital	Nagercoil	Kanyakumari	2009	60	Ayurveda
44	Government Homoeopathic Medical College and Hospital	Thirumangalam	Madurai	1987	50	Homoeopathy

== Category B Government Aided Medical Colleges ==
S.No	College name	Location	District	Established year	No. Of seats(MBBS)	Stream
45	ESIC Medical College & PGIMSR	K.K. Nagar	Chennai	2011	100	Allopathy
46	Govt. Medical College & ESIC Hospital	Singanallur	Coimbatore	2016	100	Allopathy
