= Theni Medical College =

Indian teaching hospital

Coordinates: 10.006752°N 77.554252°E

Theni Medical College and Hospital
- Motto: Rural Health Our Greatest Wealth
- Type: Medical college
- Established: 2004; 22 years ago
- Affiliations: The Tamil Nadu Dr. M.G.R. Medical University, NMC
- Dean: Dr. S. Muthu Chitra [MS (ENT)]
- Undergraduates: 100 per year
- Location: Kochi - Madurai - Dhanushkodi Road, Theni, Theni, Tamil Nadu, India
- Campus: Rural
- Website: www.tgmchen.ac.in

Theni Government Medical College and Hospital is a teaching hospital in Theni district, Tamil Nadu, India. It was established in 2004. The college is located on the National Highway 85, 9 km from the district headquarters Theni, and 7 km from Aundipatty.

== History ==
The foundation stone was laid on 16 August 2002 by Chief Minister J. Jayalalitha. The first hospital and college premises were inaugurated on 8 December 2004. In 2006, the first 100 students were admitted to the MBBS programme.

In 2016, an "ultra modern" MRA scanning machine was commissioned at the hospital.

In 2019, Tamil Nadu Police registered a first information report against a first-year medical student of the college for managing to obtain an admission without having appeared for the National Eligibility cum Entrance Test (NEET). The student was alleged to have faked his identity. Tamil Nadu police identified announced that they believed that at least six more students had managed to be enrolled in medical colleges through impersonation during the NEET exam.

In 2021, during the COVID-19 pandemic in India, a video went viral on social media showing bodies left on the floor in the hospital mortuary. The Health Department of the Tamil Nadu government ordered a probe into the apparent violation of COVID-19 protocols.

In 2022, the Madras High Court directed the health secretary of the Tamil Nadu government to investigate the death of a woman who had allegedly died due to medical negligence after a surgery.

In July 2023, Dean Dr Meenakshisundaram was suspended by the Tamil Nadu Health and Family Welfare Minister Ma. Subramanian for accepting a bribe from a contractor. In October, S. Balashankar, the former head of Paediatrics of the Government Rajaji Hospital was appointed as the Dean by the Government of Tamil Nadu.

== Medical college ==
In addition to the MBBS program, the college offers diplomas for paramedics, medical laboratory technologists, and nurses, and specialist training for MDs. In 2022, the National Medical Commission sanctioned a post-graduate course in emergency medicine at the college.

The college is affiliated with the Tamil Nadu government-owned Tamil Nadu Dr. M.G.R. Medical University. The college was accredited by the Medical Council of India (until 2020) and the National Medical Commission (since 2020). Its administration is overseen by the Department of Health and Family Welfare, Government of Tamil Nadu.

=== College departments ===
- Anatomy
- Physiology
- Biochemistry
- Microbiology
- Pathology
- Pharmacology
- Forensic Medicine
- Social and Preventive Medicine

== Hospital ==
The hospital has 900 beds and an outpatient ward.

=== Hospital departments ===
- Medicine
- Surgery
- OG
- Pediatrics
- Surgery
- Neurology
- Neurosurgery
- Orthopedics
- Dental
- Psychiatry
- ENT
- Ophthalmology
- TB centre
- Skin
- STD
- ICTC
- ART
- Radiology
- Casualty
- Central Lab.

== See also ==
- List of Tamil Nadu Government's Educational Institutions
