= Alor =

Alor may refer to:

== South Asia ==
- Aror or Alor, medieval name of a city near Rohri, Sindh, Pakistan
- Alor, Bastar, a village in Bastar district, Chhattisgarh, India

== Southeast Asia ==
- Alor Archipelago, Indonesia
  - Alor Island, Indonesia
  - Alor Strait, Indonesia
  - Alor Regency, Indonesia - comprising Alor and Pantar Islands (plus some smaller)
  - Alor–Pantar languages, a group of non-Austronesian languages
  - Alorese language, an Austronesian language spoken on Alor Archipelago, Indonesia
  - Alor Malay, a Malay-based creole language spoken in Indonesia
  - Alorese people, an ethnic group in Indonesia
- Alor Setar, a city in Malaysia
  - Menara Alor Setar, a tower in Alor Setar
- Alor Gajah, a town and a district in Melaka, Malaysia
  - AMJ Highway or the Alor Gajah Bypass
  - Alor Gajah British Graveyard

== Other ==
- Alor, Nigeria
- Alőr, the Hungarian name for Urişor village, Cășeiu Commune, Cluj County, Romania
- Australian League of Rights

== See also ==
- Aloor (disambiguation)
