= Thengampudur =

Coordinates: 8°07′25″N 77°26′24″E

- town
- Interactive map of Thengampudur
- Country: India
- State: Tamil Nadu
- District: Kanniyakumari

Population (2001)
  - Total: 12,669

Languages
  - Official: Tamil
- Time zone: UTC+5:30 (IST)

Thengamputhur is a town in Kanyakumari district in the Indian state of Tamil Nadu.

From October 2021, Thengamputhur and Aloor town panchayats were integrated into the Nagercoil Corporation.

== Demographics ==
As of 2001 India census, Thengamputhur had a population of 12,669. Males constitute 50% of the population and females 50%. Thengamputhur has an average literacy rate of 80%, higher than the national average of 59.5%: male literacy is 82%, and female literacy is 78%. In Thengamputhur, 10% of the population is under 6 years of age.
