= Kilpauk Medical College =

Medical school in Chennai, India

Coordinates: 13.078347°N 80.243722°E

Government Kilpauk Medical College
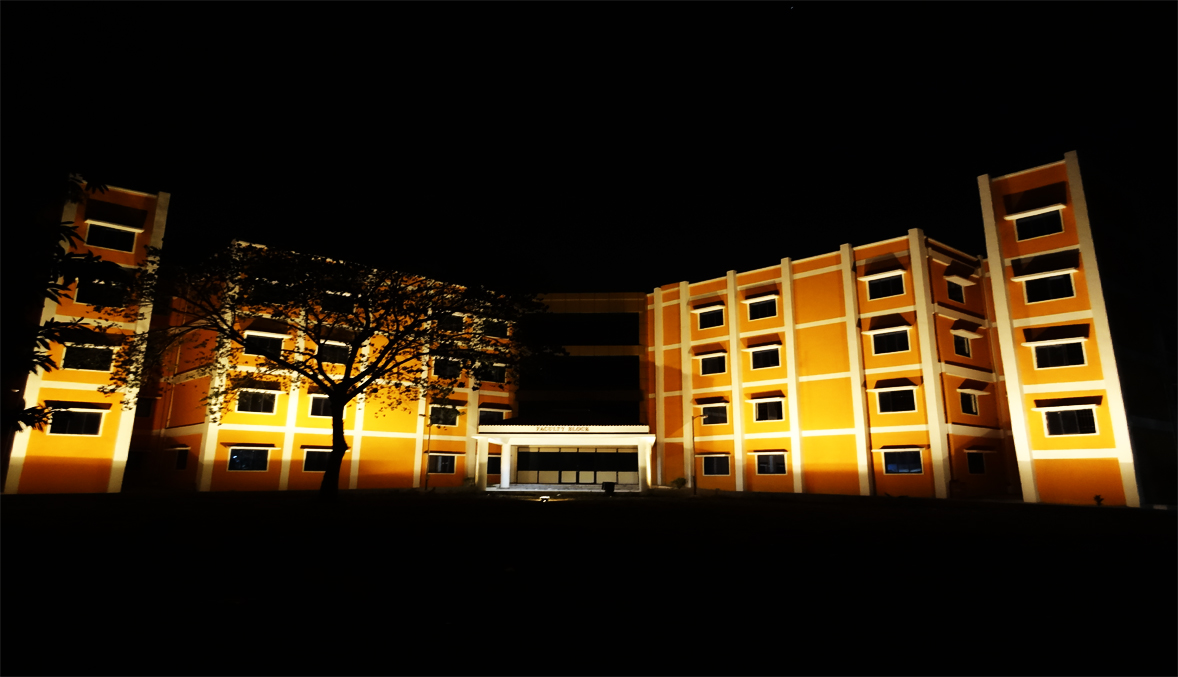
- The faculty block of Kilpauk Medical College
- Motto: Mens Sana Incorpore Sano ("A sound mind in a sound body")
- Type: Medical college
- Established: 1960; 66 years ago
- Affiliations: Tamil Nadu Dr. M.G.R. Medical University
- Dean: Dr. M. Kavitha
- Location: Chennai, India
- Website: https://kilpaukmedicalcollege.in/
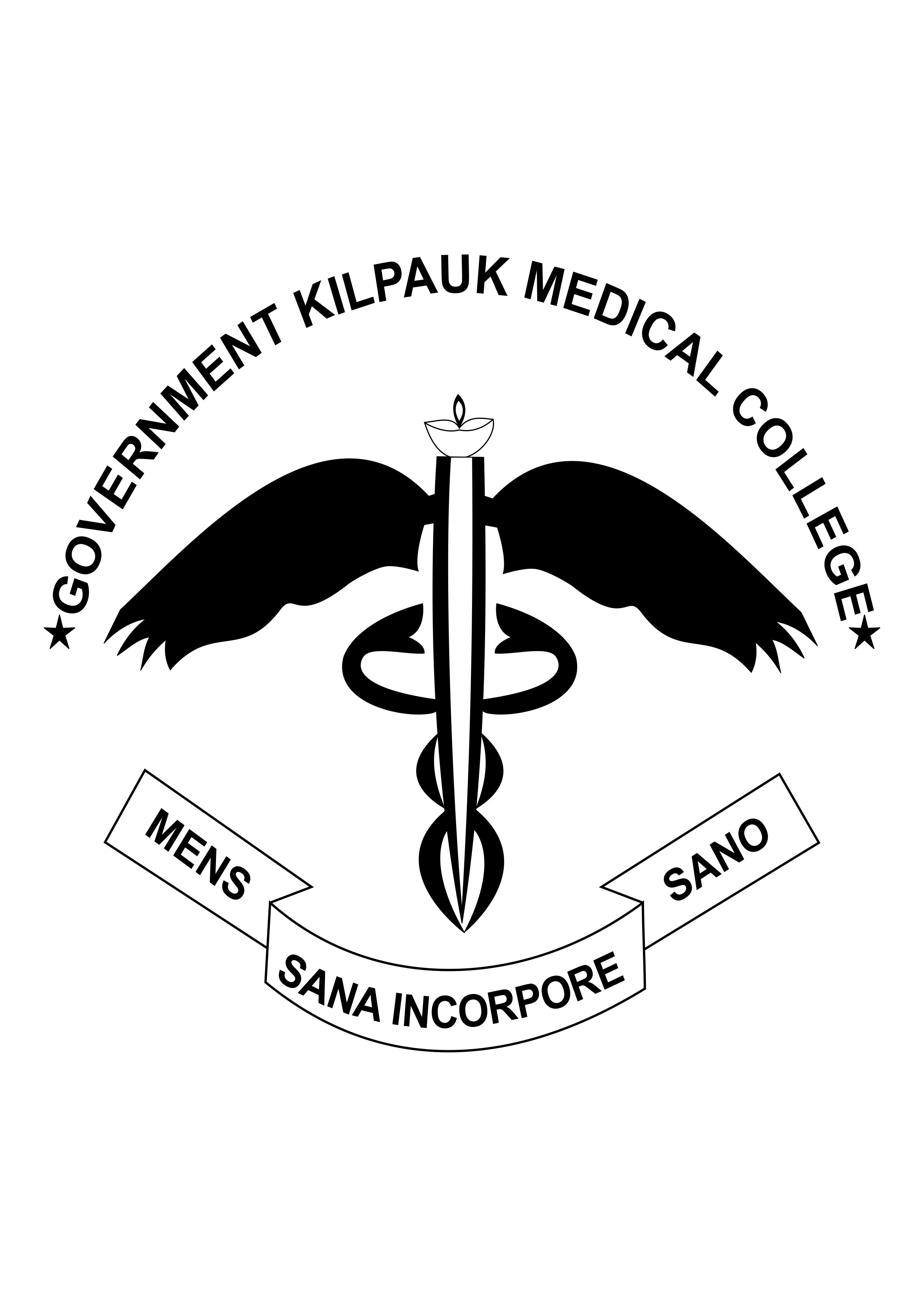

Government Kilpauk Medical College (GKMC) is a government medical institution in Chennai, India. Founded in 1960, there are four hospitals attached to GKMC - Government Kilpauk Medical College Hospital. They are Government Royapettah Hospital, Government Thiruvotteeswarar Hospital of Thoracic Medicine, Government Peripheral Hospital, K.K.Nagar and Government Peripheral Hospital, Anna Nagar. The college is affiliated to The Tamil Nadu Dr. M.G.R. Medical University, Chennai. It offers a number of undergraduate and postgraduate programs.

The hospital is the third in the government sector, after the Rajiv Gandhi Government General Hospital and the Government Royapettah Hospital, to have a full-fledged emergency department, which includes triage area, resuscitation bay and colour-coded zones, per the Tamil Nadu Accident and Emergency Care Initiative (TAEI) guidelines. The hospital is recognised as a level II trauma care centre. The zero-delay ward of the hospital receives an average of 40 to 50 cases every day.

== Classes and years of entry ==
Every class of MBBS students has assigned to itself an (unofficial) name denoting the year of their entry into the medical school.

The recent batches

- Awesome KMC 1974
- Idhayam 1978
- Dejavu 1987
- Ruptures 1992 (First batch to start naming in Tamilnadu medical colleges)
- Blitzkrieg 1993
- Zenith 1994
- Kosmic 1995
- Elanza 1996
- Zodiac 1997
- Narumigil 1998
- Elixir 1999
- Dynamics 2000
- Sigaram 2001
- Swasam 2002
- Vasantham 2003
- Agni 2004
- Nakshatraz 2005
- Thendral 2006
- Rhythmz 2007
- Valiantz 2008
- Ruthraz 2009
- Sarithraaz 2010
- Xorticanz 2011
- Varshaas 2012
- Mithraaz 2013
- Yukthaaz 2014
- Sharvaas 2015
- Dhruvaaz 2016
- Rithvaaz 2017
- Udhiraaz 2018
- Asthraaz 2019
- Dheeraaz 2020
- Yakshaaz 2021
- Vidhuraaz 2022
- Garudaaz 2023
- Batch 2024
- Freshers 2025

== Affiliation ==
The college is affiliated to The Tamil Nadu Dr. MGR Medical University.

=== Undergraduate programs ===
This College provides UG MBBS Course recognised by NMC - National Medical Commission Of India with a strength of 150 students per year. It is a 5.5 year course including 1 year of CRMI (Internship). The Admission is through the All India Exam named NEET UG - National Eligibility cum Entrance Test (Undergraduate) happening once every year.

Selection for admission for 85% of the total seats is done by Directorate of Medical Education and Research, Tamilnadu under the Department of Health and Family Welfare (Tamil Nadu) and for the remaining 15% seats, it is done by the Medical Counselling Committee under the Ministry of Health and Family Welfare, Government of India.

=== Postgraduate programs ===
Previously, the seats in the different postgraduate programs (diploma and degree programs) were filled by:

- State level PG Entrance Exam (TNPG)
- National level PG Entrance Exam (AIPGME)

Since 2017, there are no separate entrance exams, and a candidate has to qualify a single entrance exam, National Eligibility cum Entrance Test (NEET), to get into a post-graduate seat.

Details of diploma, postgraduate degree and higher specialty courses

Postgraduate diploma course

- Diploma in Obstetrics & Gynecology
- Diploma in Child Health
- Diploma in Oto-Rhino-Laryngology
- Diploma in Anaesthesia
- Diploma in Orthopaedics
- Diploma in Clinical Pathology

Postgraduate degree course

- M.D.General Medicine
- M.D.Pathology
- M.D.Microbiology
- M.D. Biochemistry
- M.D.Obstetrics & Gynaecology
- M.D.Physiology
- M.D.Paediatrics
- M.D.Anaesthesiology
- M.S.General Surgery
- M.S.E.N.T.
- M.S.Orthopaedics
- M.D.Community medicine
- M.D.Tuberculosis and Respiratory Medicine
- M.D.Psychiatry
- M.D.Radio diagnosis
- M.D.Forensic Medicine

Postgraduate higher speciality degree course

- D.M. Gastroenterology
- D.M. Nephrology
- M.Ch. Urology
- M.Ch. Plastic Surgery
- M.Ch. Surgical Oncology

== About the New Hospital ==
There is a New Hospital Muti - speciality block built near the old Kilpauk Medical College Hospital

a. 450 bedded hospital

b. includes neurology, cardiology, neurosurgery, emergency, nephrology, plastic surgery and operation theatres

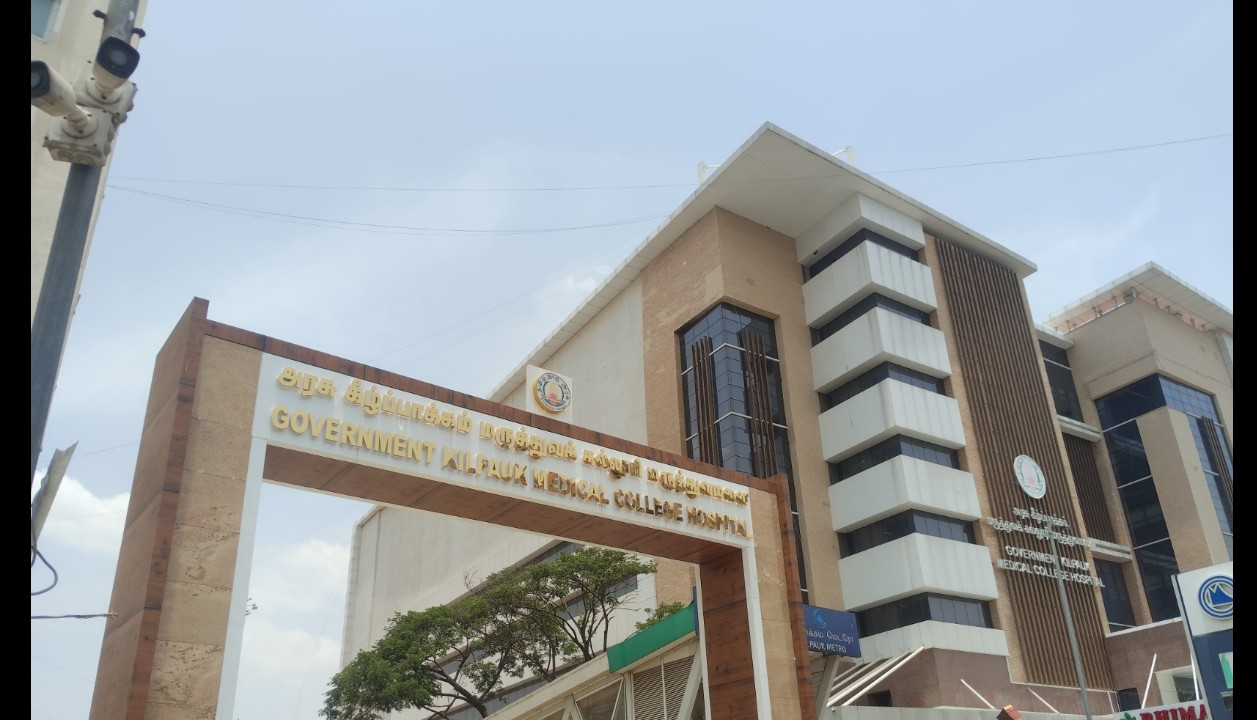
NEW HOSPITAL BLOCK - KMC

Already some of the departments have started to function in the new hospital due to metro rail works undergoing in the old buildings of the respective departments.

Moreover, some part of the college area has also been undertaken by the CMRL for 4 way Metro Lineworks at Kilpauk Metro station since 2024.

== Notable alumni ==
- Ravi Kannan R, surgical oncologist. Director of Cachar Cancer Hospital and Research Centre (CCHRC), Silchar. Recipient of Padma Shri, Mahaveer Award and Ramon Magsaysay Award.

== Official College Link ==
- Official website
