= Government Rajaji Hospital =

Hospital in India

Government Rajaji Hospital is situated in Madurai, Tamil Nadu, India. The hospital provides tertiary care to more than twenty million people in the southern part of Tamil Nadu. The hospital was formerly known as Erskines Hospital. The hospital was established in 1842 and was taken over by the municipality of Madurai in 1872 and the state administration took over in 1918 and became a teaching hospital in 1954. The area of the hospital is 12.47 acres (5.05 ha) (Plinth area 1,04,358 Sq.ft). Bed strength of the hospital is 2,518. Madurai Medical College is a medical school attached to the Government Rajaji Hospital in Madurai, Tamil Nadu, India. It is most busiest hospital in state of Tamil Nadu also it is the only hospital in the State to have doctors available 24x7 in all speciality departments.

The hospital is not only centre of excellence in Southern Tamil Nadu but also in the State for various surgeries. It serves as a tertiary level referral hospital to all the medical college Hospitals of Southern and Central Tamil Nadu. Open heart, closed heart surgeries and valve replacement are performed in this hospital. Master Health Check-up is available. This hospital provides 24 hours casualty facility, 24 hours bio-chemistry lab facility, CT Scan and MRI Scan facility and so on. It provides tertiary care with the comprehensive health insurance scheme by the government of Tamil Nadu.
