= Government Pudukkottai Medical College and Hospital =

Government Medical College and Hospital Pudukkottai
- அரசு மருத்துவக்கல்லூரி மற்றும் மருத்துவமனை புதுக்கோட்டை
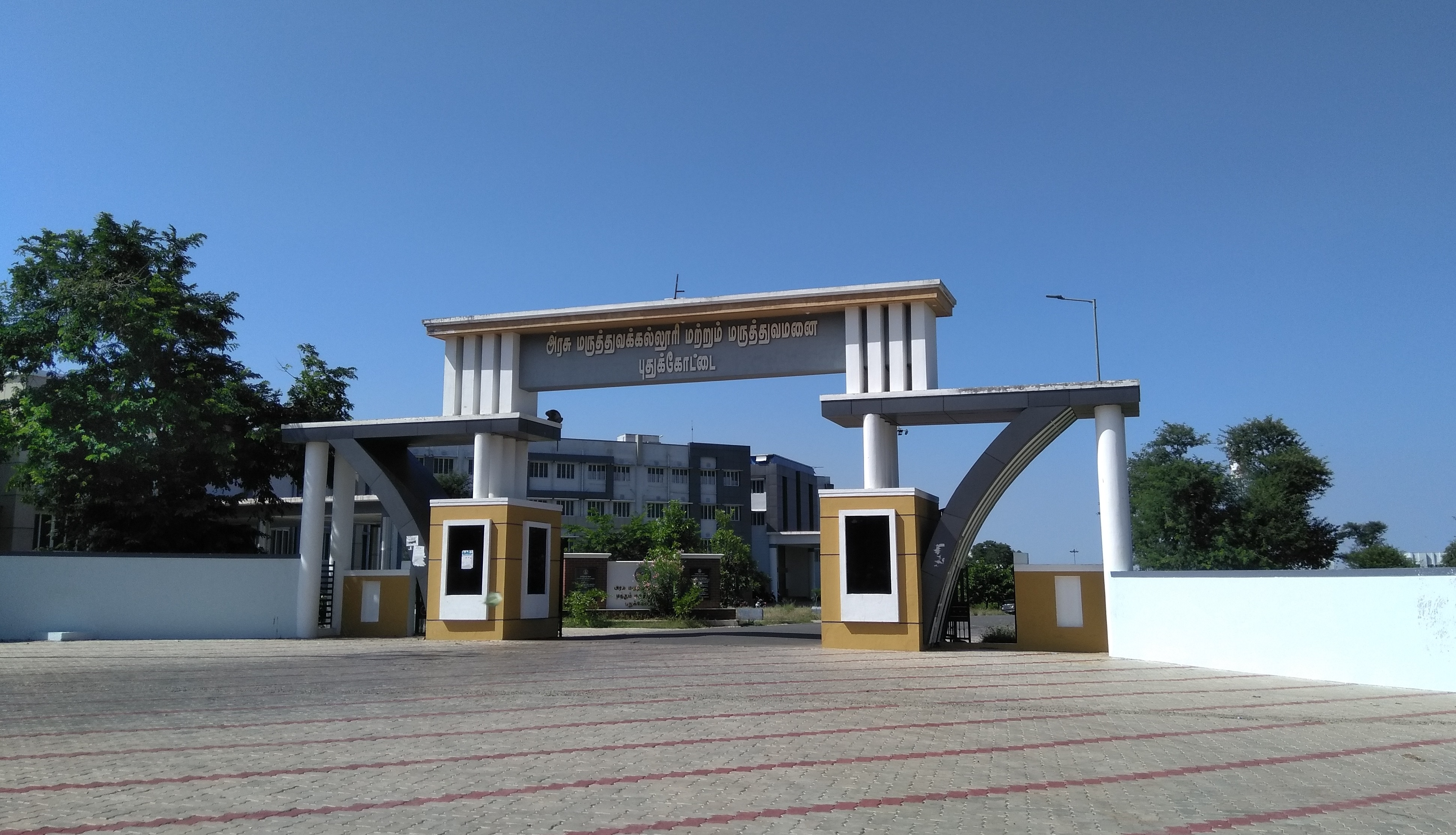
- Motto: Care, Serve, Cure
- Type: Government Medical College and Hospital
- Established: 2017
- Affiliations: Tamil Nadu Dr. MGR Medical University
- Dean: Dr. S. Kalaivani MD (DVL).,
- Management: Department of Health and Family Welfare (Tamil Nadu) - Directorate of Medical Education
- Undergraduates: 150 per year (MBBS)
- Postgraduates: 2 (DNB-Emergency Medicine)
- Location: Mullur, Pudukkottai, Tamil Nadu, India; 10.4082637°N 78.8466179°E
- Campus: Urban
- Website: gpmch.ac.in

Government Medical College and Hospital Pudukkottai (Tamil: அரசு மருத்துவக் கல்லூரி மற்றும் மருத்துவமனை‌‌, புதுக்கோட்டை) is a medical college run by the state government of Tamil Nadu, which is recognized by Medical Council of India. It is located in the city of Pudukkottai, in Tamil Nadu.

== History and major events ==
The college was sanctioned by late former Chief Minister Selvi J.Jayalalitha in August 2015, who laid the foundation for the college and hospital on 1 March 2016. It was inaugurated by the then-chief minister of Tamil Nadu, Edappadi K. Palaniswami, on 9 June 2017. The college and hospital buildings were constructed at an estimate of Rs. 229.46 crore on about 250 acres (100 ha) of land. It was the 22nd government medical college and hospital in the state. On 4 September the courses for M.B.B.S., started with a grand ceremony. It is also one of the first college in Tamil Nadu to receive permission to admit 150 students in its first year of commencement. It is also one of the first college to invite honourable minister of health and family welfare department as chief guest for cultural events Shrestha'18 held on 25-01-2018. Sangamam'19 culturals event held on 10.01.2019 and the first college magazine named Crescendo was released by Minister of state Health and Family Welfare Department Dr. C. Vijaybaskar. Regalia 2019 along with Tamil mandram "Ilazhanthamizhoosai 19" was conducted in the presence of Minister of state Health and Family Welfare Department Dr. C. Vijaybaskar on 13 and 14 November.

== COVID 19 Swab Collection Chamber ==
During COVID-19 pandemic, The persons involved in Swab collection were exposed to the risk of infection. Smart innovations happen during such troubled times and the Dean of Pudukkottai Medical College developed one such solution. He created a partition in the testing area for COVID-19 patients. The glass partition has just two holes for the doctor's hands to collect the nasopharyngeal swab. The patient enters the room, the doctor puts a hand through the partition (wearing gloves), takes the swab and the patient leaves.

== Eco Friendly Campus ==
Aggressive afforestation is being carried throughout the length and breadth of the Campus, With the aim to get more green cover than that was present in the area before the construction of the college. Some of the major NGO s in the area, Students, Faculties, and staffs of the college were also involved in the process.

- World Environment days 2020, 2021, were conducted amidst the COVID-19, M.B.B.S students of this college planted saplings at their homes on the occasion.
- The Dean of the college also opened Ezhil Park, as a part of the afforestation which has added to the beauty of the campus.

All the functions happening in the college are now marked by planting a tree sapling.

=== World Population Day 2019 ===
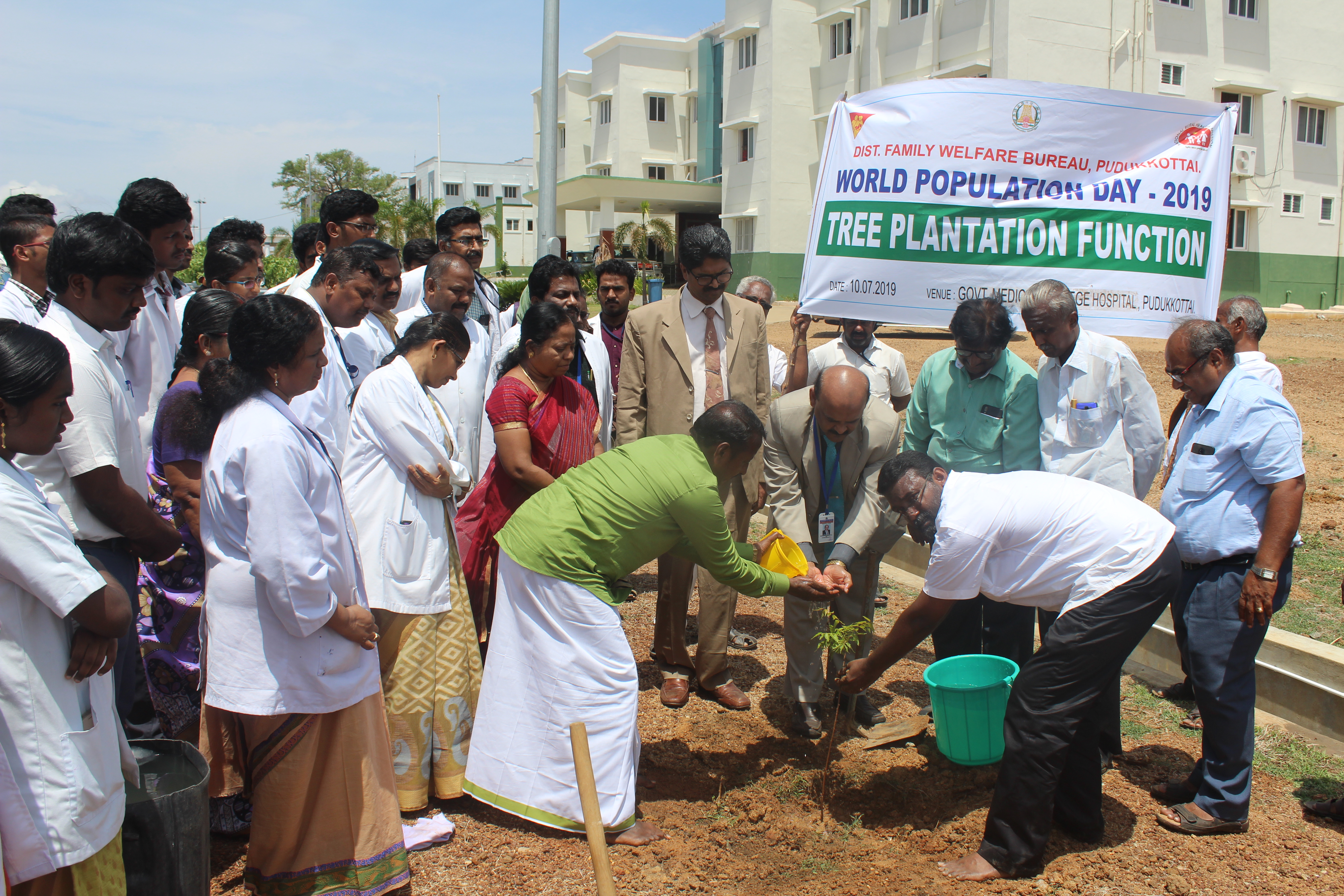
World Population day 2019 Students in World Population day 2019 World Population Day 2019 - 200 sapling of Native trees planted in association with Maram Arrakatalai.

== Cultural events ==
Shrestha'18

Sangamam'19-சங்கமம்'19

Regalia'19 and இளந்தமிழோசை'19
