= Aloor =

Aloor may refer to:

- Aloor, Tamil Nadu, a Panchyat Town in Kanyakumari district, Tamil Nadu, India
- Alur, Maharashtra, a village in Maharashtra, India also called "Aloor"
- Aloor, Kerala, a place in Kerala, India

== See also ==
- Alur (disambiguation)
