= Tamil Nadu Medical Services =

Tamil Nadu Medical Services Corporation Limited (TNMSC)
- Native name: தமிழ்நாடு மருத்துவப் பணிகள் கழகம் (வரையறுக்கப்பட்டது) (டி என் எம் எஸ் சி)
- Type: A Government of Tamil Nadu Undertaking
- Industry: Medical services
- Founded: 1 July 1994 (commenced its operation from January 1995)
- Headquarters: 417, Second floor, Pantheon Road, Egmore, Chennai – 600 008 Tamil Nadu, India
- Area served: Tamil Nadu
- Key people: J. Radhakrishnan IAS- Chairman/ Director (Principal Secretary to Tamil Nadu Government, Health & Family Welfare Department); Dr.P Umanath, I.A.S – managing director Tamil Nadu
- Owner: Government of Tamil Nadu through Department of Health and Family Welfare (Tamil Nadu)
- Website: www.tnmsc.tn.gov.in

Tamil Nadu Medical Services Corporation Limited (TNMSC) (Tamil: தமிழ்நாடு மருத்துவப் பணிகள் கழகம் (வரையறுக்கப்பட்டது) (டி என் எம் எஸ் சி)) is a state-government undertaking of Government of Tamil Nadu located in the Indian state of Tamil Nadu. The TNMSC was incorporated under the Companies Act, 1956 on 1 July 1994.

== Functions of TNMSC ==
- Procurement, Testing, Storage and Distribution of Drugs, Medicines, Surgicals & Sutures, Kits, Reagents to the Tamil Nadu Government Medical Institutions & Hospitals ( Human / Veterinary )
- Procurement, Testing, Storage and Distribution of Medical Equipments and Instruments to the Tamil Nadu Government Medical Institutions & Hospitals ( Human / Veterinary )
- Operate 51 CT Scans Centres (X-ray computed tomography), 64 Slice CT Scan Centers, 8 M.R.I Scans Centre (Magnetic resonance imaging), 2 Lithotripsy Centre, 7 Regional Diagnostic Centres (offers 68 different Diagnostic lab tests) and Master Health Checkup Centers at Tamil Nadu Government Medical Institutions & Hospitals
- Operate Pay Wards (offers Special Class Maternity Wards in Government Kasthurba Gandhi Hospital, Government Hospital and Government General Hospital in Chennai)
- Operate Institute of Obstetrics and Gynaecology
- Operate GI Bleed and Hepatobiliary Centre at Government Stanley Hospital, Chennai
- Operates a special Sale Counter at Government Medical College Hospital, Kilpauk, Chennai for a sale of life saving drugs to the Public at rates much lesser than the market rate
- Operate warehouses at 25 district headquarters
