= Government Thoothukudi Medical College and Hospital =

Medical institution in South India

Thoothukudi Medical College
- Motto in English: Born to Serve
- Type: Government Medical College and Hospital
- Established: 2000 (26 years ago)
- Affiliations: The Tamil Nadu Dr. M.G.R. Medical University
- Dean: Dr. G. Sivakumar MD., DA.,
- Management: Department of Health and Family Welfare, Government of Tamil Nadu
- Location: Thoothukudi, Tamil Nadu, India; 8.78421°N 78.12020°E
- Campus: Urban, 25 acres (0.10 km^{2})
- Website: www.gtkmc.ac.in

Thoothukudi Medical College, also known as TKMC, or Government Medical College Thoothukudi, is a medical institution in South India, located in the city of Thoothukudi, in the state of Tamil Nadu, India. The college is affiliated to The Tamil Nadu Dr. M.G.R. Medical University and is recognised by the National Medical Commission of India and World Health Organization.

== History ==
The Government of Tamil Nadu established the Thoothukudi Medical College on 16 August 2000. It was initially located inside the campus of Fisheries College and Research Institute Department, Beach Road, then shifted to the 3rd Mile, Thoothukudi during the year 2001.

In July 2001, the first batch of 100 MBBS students started attending the classes in newly constructed building at 3rd Mile. Other departments like Pharmacology, Pathology, Microbiology and Social & Preventive Medicine started functioning in the subsequent years, and the District Headquarters Hospital was converted to Thoothukudi Medical College Hospital. The college was affiliated to The Tamil Nadu Dr. M.G.R. Medical University

== College and location ==
=== The Medical College ===
The Thoothukudi Medical College, along with its primary teaching hospital, is located at 3rd Mile in the city of Thoothukudi, in the state of Tamil Nadu, India. College Motto is Born to Serve. The college is present over a campus of around 25 acres close to Thoothukudi Government Polytechnic campus and has well-equipped lecture halls, libraries, reading rooms, auditoria and separate hostels and mess for men and women.

The college, the hospital and the hostels are all located within a radius of 1 kilometre. The college is located within about 5.1 kilometres from the Railway Station and 3.2 kilometer from the Bus Stand. The college on Google Maps

== Courses offered ==
=== Undergraduate medical course ===
List of Under graduate courses offered
No	Course Name	No of Seats per year	Course Duration
1	M.B.B.S	150	5½ years

=== Post graduate courses ===
List of Post graduate courses offered
No	Course Name	No of Seats per year	Course Duration
1	M.D Anaesthesiology	08	3 years
2	M.D Emergency Medicine	05	3 years
3	M.D General Medicine	10	3 years
4	M.D Paediatrics	06	3 years
5	M.D Forensic Medicine	02	3 years
6	M.S General Surgery	10	3 years
7	M.S Obstetrics and Gynaecology	06	3 years
8	M.S Orthopedics	03	3 years
9	M.S ENT	02	3 years

=== Super speciality courses ===
List of Super speciality courses offered
No	Course Name	No of Seats per year	Course Duration
1	D.M Neurology	02	3 years
2	D.M Medical Gastroenterology	01	3 years

=== Diploma courses ===
- Diploma in Nursing (3½ years)
- Diploma in Medical Laboratory Technology (2 years)
- Diploma in Anesthesia Technician (1 year)
- Diploma in Operation Theatre Technician (1 year)

=== Technician courses ===
- BSc Operation Theatre & Anesthesia Technician (4 Year)
- BSc Respiratory Therapy Technician (4 Year)
- Certified of Radiological Assistant (1 Year)

=== Other courses ===
- Nursing Assistant Course (1 Year)

== Admission ==
The college admits 100 students from 2000 to 2012 batch. Recently the college admits 150 students (Batch of 2013) to the MBBS course once every year based on neet mark . There are 15% seat reserved for all India quota and 85% reserved for state quota .

=== Departments ===
- ANATOMY
- PHYSIOLOGY
- Biochemistry
- PATHOLOGY
- MICROBIOLOGY
- PHARMACOLOGY
- FORENSIC MEDICINE
- General surgery
- General Medicine
- Ophthalmology
- OTORHINOLARYNGOLOGY
- Paediatrics
- Anaesthesia
- Venereology & Dermatology
- Thoracic Medicine
- Psychiatry
- Obstetrics and Gynaecology
- Orthopaedics
- Radiology
- Radiotherapy
- GENERAL Medicine
- Dentistry
- Neurology
- Gastroenterology
- NEUROSURGERY
- PLASTIC SURGERY
- MEDICAL ONCOLOGY
- PEDIATRIC SURGERY
- CARDIOLOGY
- NEPHROLOGY
- Anti Retro Viral Treatment Centre

=== Cultural events ===
Thoothukudi medical college hosts intra-college sports and cultural extravaganza events in the name of "RADIANCE & RESMAGNA" Every year
