= The Nilgiris Government Medical College and Hospital =

Hospital and medical school in India

Government Medical College and Hospital, The Nilgiris
- Type: Medical College and Hospital
- Established: 2021; 5 years ago
- Affiliations: Tamil Nadu Dr. M.G.R. Medical University, NMC
- Dean: Dr. E. Seenivasan
- Location: Udagamandalam, Tamil Nadu, India; 11.425038°N 76.673690°E
- Website: gmchnilgiris.ac.in

Government Medical College and Hospital, The Nilgiris is a government medical college and hospital. The college is located in the Udagamandalam city in the Nilgiris district of Tamil Nadu. The city belongs to the Nilgiri mountains range. A professional Bachelor of Medicine and Surgery (MBBS) degree is awarded by the college.

The studies in the college started from the academic year 2021–2022.

== History ==
Former Chief Minister of Tamil Nadu K Palaniswami laid the foundation stone of The Nilgiris Government Medical College and Hospital in Udagamandalam city on 10 July 2020 (Friday) through video conferencing. Local MLA and high officials of the district were present on the occasion. After the laying of the foundation stone, a time frame of 18 months was set for the completion of the project. The construction cost of the college was jointly paid by the Union Government and the State Government. There was a delay in building the infrastructure of the medical college. Since the start of construction till October 2022, only four blocks of the campus have been completed. Residential quarters, cafeteria, faculty rooms and hostels were still not ready. On 12 January 2023, Prime Minister Narendra Modi inaugurated 11 medical colleges across the state of Tamil Nadu including Nilgiri Government Medical College and Hospital. In the opening ceremony, Tamil Nadu Chief Minister M.K. Stalin was present.

== Campus ==
The campus is spread over a total area of 40 acres, including 25 acres of land in Indu Nagar, Udagamandalam and 15 acres of land in its adjoining areas. The medical college and hospital infrastructure includes quarters for doctors, nurses and paramedical staff, and 750 hostel rooms for medical students.

== Courses ==
Nilgiris Government Medical College and Hospital undertakes education and training of 150 students in MBBS stream every year.

== Affiliated ==
The college is affiliated with Tamil Nadu Dr. M.G.R. Medical University and is recognized by the National Medical Commission.
