= Chengalpattu Medical College =

Educational institution in Tamil Nadu, India

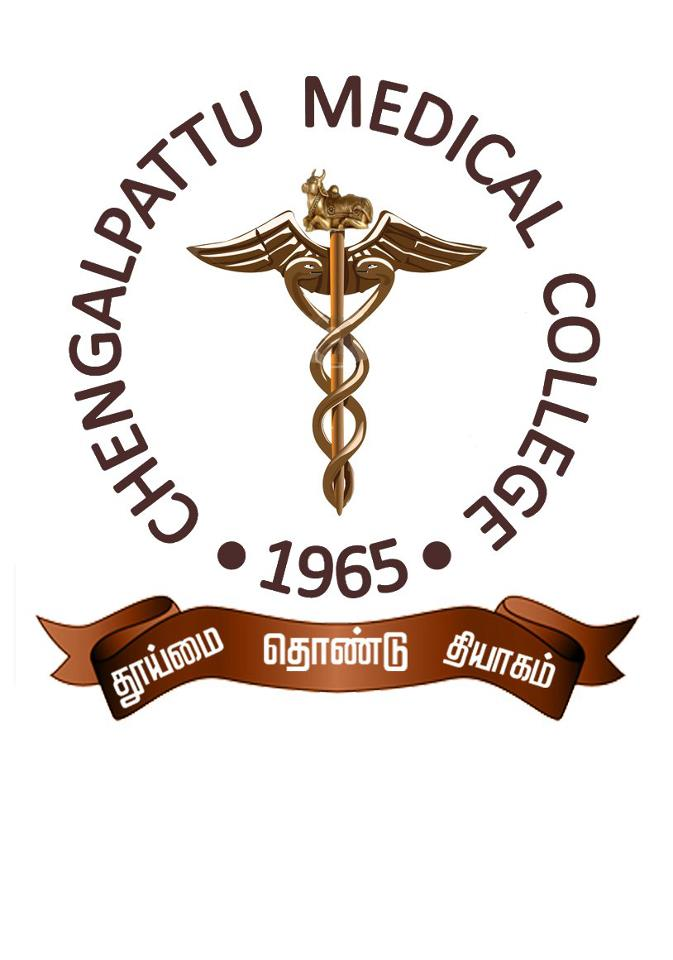
- Established: 1965; 61 years ago
- Affiliations: Tamil Nadu Dr. M.G.R. Medical University
- Dean: Dr. Priya Pasupathy
- Students: 500
- Undergraduates: 100 per year each in medical and nursing
- Postgraduates: 82 per year
- Location: GST Road, Chengalpattu - 603001, Chengalpattu, Tamil Nadu, India; 12.670871°N 79.980128°E
- Website: www.cmccpt.ac.in

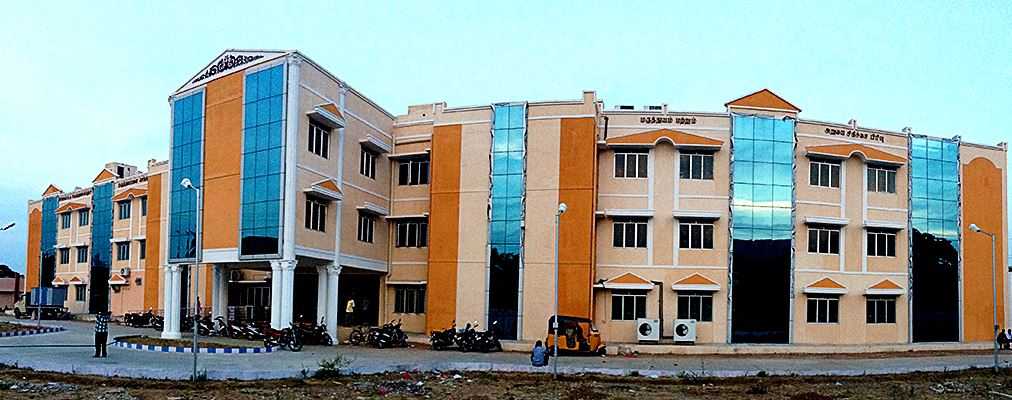
The new Surgical and Medical Block with Radiology, Lab, OT and in-patient services

Chengalpattu Medical College is a public educational institution located in Chengalpattu, Tamil Nadu, India, 54 km south-west of Chennai and is ranked 5th among the government medical colleges in Tamil Nadu

== History ==
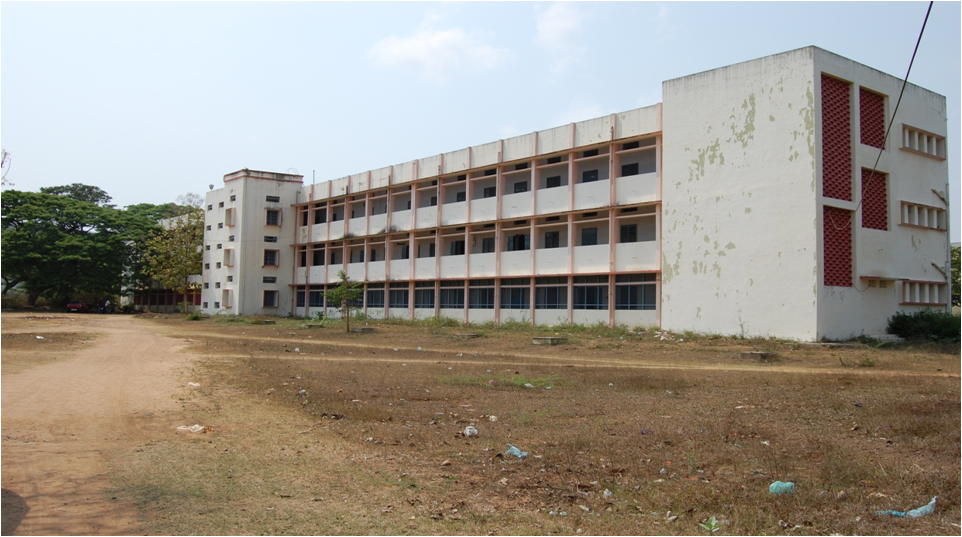
The Examination Block which includes the Departments of Pathology, Microbiology, Forensic Medicine and Community Medicine

The history of the Chengalpattu Medical College dates back to days before 1965 when this was a district headquarters hospital with its building in the town. In 1965, the Government of Tamil Nadu upgraded this District Headquarters hospital to function as a teaching institution with 250 beds for clinical training. Vedachalam Mudaliar, the then Chairman of Chengalpattu Municipality, donated a vast area of land, which is in possession of this institution today. To begin with, this institution had an annual admission of 50 students, which the institution maintained till 2012. 100 students have been admitted from the academic year 2012-13 onwards. This 50-year-old institution was the 6th of its kind to be started in Tamil Nadu. The college initially trained D.M. & S. students, who had passed out of Kilpauk Medical College, for the Condensed MBBS Course. Girls students were first admitted in the year 1970 and the first batch of M.B.B.S.graduates of the college left in 1972. The hospital, at its dawn, was functioning with the basic departments which included medicine, surgery, obstetrics and gynaecology, pediatrics, orthopedics, ophthalmology, otolaryngology, psychiatry and chest clinic. As days went by, other departments started functioning one by one, making the hospital a tertiary care center with a multi specialty approach. The specialties presently functioning are neurology, cardiology, nephrology, pediatric surgery, plastic surgery, urology, neurosurgery, etcetera.

== Affiliation ==
This college is affiliated to the Tamil Nadu Dr. M.G.R. Medical University. It is recognized by the National Medical Commission.

== Campus ==
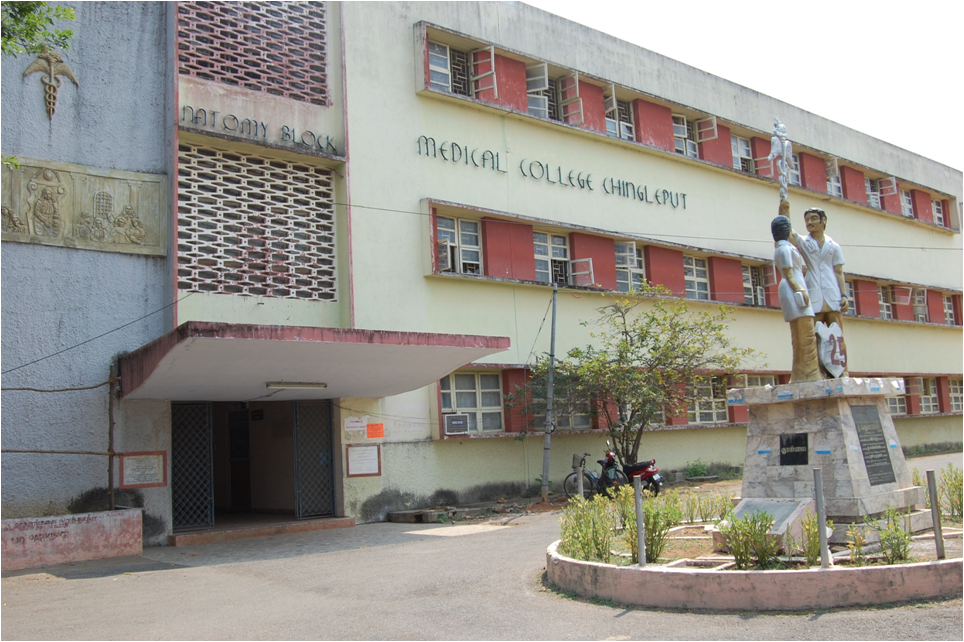
The Anatomy Block

Chengalpattu Medical College Hospital is the District Headquarters Hospital of Chengalpattu District, Tamil Nadu. It is the only governmental tertiary health care centre in this district and serves as the referral unit for several secondary care centres and Primary Health Centres (PHC's) in the area. The college along with the associated hospital is spread over 265 acres of land, making it the largest medical college campus in Tamil Nadu.

There are two main blocks in the college side - 1) the Anatomy Block, which houses the Departments of Anatomy, Physiology, Biochemistry and Pharmacology and 2) the Examination Block, inside which the Departments of Pathology, Microbiology, Forensic and Community Medicine are found. The college also boasts of an air-conditioned, well-equipped and updated library, with MEDLAR and internet facilities. Apart from these, the college has an auditorium with a capacity of 750 seats and a central lecture hall capable of seating 300 students.

On the hospital side, there are three main functioning blocks - the old OP block, the new OP block and a third modern state-of-the-art two-storey building which now houses the surgery and medicine wards. The old OP block has the Casualty wing, the OPs of Urology, Nephrology, Neurosurgery and other super specialties. The new block houses the out-patient Departments of General Surgery, Dermatology with STD wing, ENT and Dental Surgery departments. Apart from these, separate buildings are available for Orthopaedics, Obstetrics & Gynaecology (OG), Ophthalmology, Cardiology, Psychiatry, Trauma ward, Paediatric OP and Thoracic Medicine OP. A connector runs between the old OP and OG block. A new two-storey Neonatology block has also been recently inaugurated.

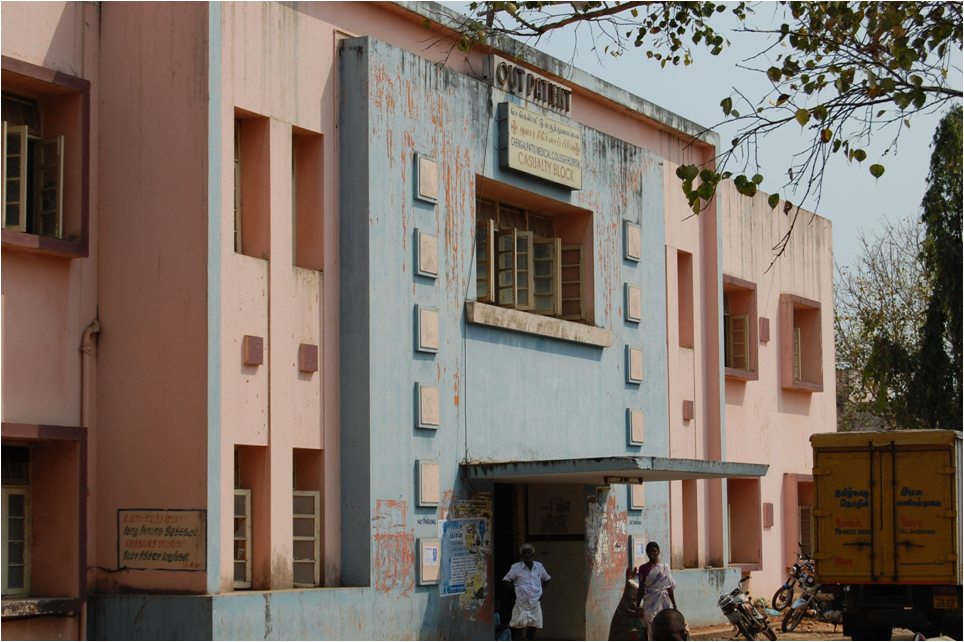
The old out-patient block of the Chengalpattu GH

== Hospital facilities ==
The total bed strength of the hospital is 1100. The General Medicine and General Surgery departments have four units each, while the Orthopaedics and OG departments (including family welfare) function with three units each. The paediatrics department runs two units.

There are four main operation theatres (OT) and several minor OTs. The Orthopaedics, Obstetrics and Gynaecology, and Ophthalmology departments have separate OTs, while the ENT and the surgical super-specialities share a main OT. An emergency OT exists, close to the casualty and labour wards. A new Tamil Nadu accident emergency intervention ward, catheterization lab and DEIC Unit have been opened. Intensive Care Units for Surgery, Medicine, Paediatric, and Neonatology are present in the respective departments.

The Radiology department is equipped with CT-scan, MRI-Scan, Ultra-sound, Doppler, and digital X-ray facilities. The Cardiology department has echocardiography and computerized treadmill electrocardiography (ECG) alongside other facilities. A 16 channel electroencephalography (EEG) is housed in the neurology department. Dialysis is carried out regularly in the Nephrology wing of the hospital.

== Courses ==
Selection to the MBBS course is based on performance in the NEET, for 85% of the seats in Tamil Nadu. Admission is based strictly on merit and the reservation policies enforced by the Government of Tamil Nadu. Neet scores around 600 are usually required for admission into this college through the open category. The remaining 15% of the seats for All India students are filled based on selection through the NEET UG.

For the Post Graduate (PG) and Super-specialty courses, 50% of the admission is to the Tamil Nadu quota students, while the remaining 50% is to the All India quota through PG NEET

=== Medical courses ===
==== Under graduation ====
- MBBS - 100 seats

==== Post graduation ====
Medical branches:

- M.D. General Medicine - 10 seats
- M.D. Obstetrics and Gynaecology - 10 seats
- M.D. Paediatrics - 2 seats (increased to 6 from 2017–18)
- M.D. Anaesthesia - 12 seats
- M.D. Dermatology, Venerology and Leprosy - 4 seats
- M.D. Physiology - 2 seats
- M.D. Pharmacology - 2 seats
- M.D. Microbiology - 2 seats
- M.D. Pathology - 2 seats
- M.D. Psychiatry - 3 seats (from academic year 2016-17)
- M.D.spm - 3 seats.
- M.D.biochemistry- 3 seats...

Surgical branches

- M.S. General Surgery - 15 seats
- M.S. ophthalmology - 2 seats
- M.S. orthopaedics-6 seats.
- M.s Ent -2 seats ..

Speciality courses

- M.Ch. Plastic and Reconstructive Surgery - 1 seat
- D.m cardiology- 4 seats
- D.m neurology -4 seats
- D.m neonatology- 4 seats

=== Paramedical courses and student activities ===
- B.Sc. Nursing - 50 seats
- B.Sc. Radiology - 20 seats
- Diploma in Nursing
- Diploma in Medical Laboratory Technology (D.M.L.T.)
- Emergency Technician Course - 4 seats/yr
- Orthopaedic Technician - 2 seats/yr
- MHW/FHW/MNA/FNA Training

== Student activities ==
- CHARM - Chengalpattu annual academic and research meet and a grand national level quiz CHEMFIOS
- CHEMSPORTS - An annual inter-medical sports event
- CHEMFEST - Annual cultural extravaganza
- Thamizh mandram - Intracollege thamizh mandram celebrations with major and minor events
- College day and Magazine (CHEMMAG) release
- Hostel day celebrations
- Graduation day
- Monthly magazine Chemvibes and thamizh theni are released every month.
- Greenclub and Swach bharath activities and many health awareness activities and programmes.
- Swearing in of college and hostel council every year by the students consisting of president, general secretaries, and others
