= Government Sivagangai Medical College and Hospital =

Medical Institution

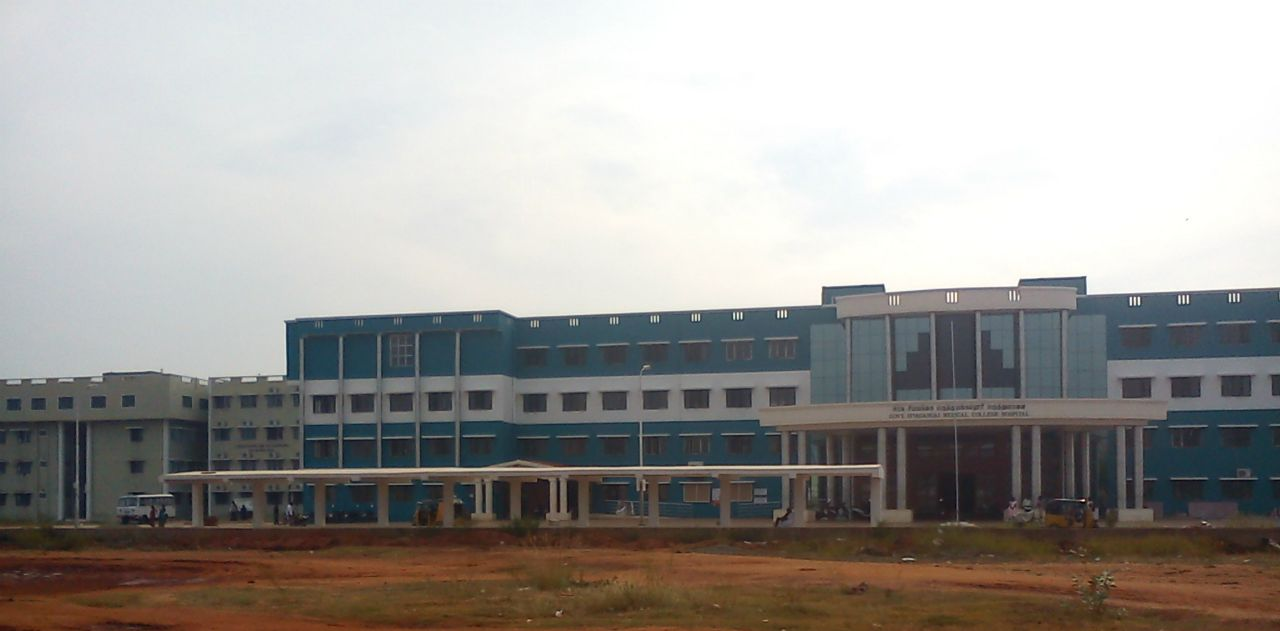
- Motto: Learn To Serve Poor
- Type: Government Medical College and Hospital
- Established: 2012
- Affiliations: Tamil Nadu Dr. MGR Medical University
- Dean: Dr. Kalaivani
- Management: Department of Health and Family Welfare, Government of Tamil Nadu
- Faculty: 200 (approx.)
- Administrative staff: 600 (approx.)
- Undergraduates: 100 per year (MBBS)
- Postgraduates: 26 per year (MD/MS)
- Location: Sivagangai, Tamil Nadu, India; 9°50′15.62″N 78°28′44.64″E
- Campus: Rural (30 acres)
- Nickname: GSMCH
- Website: http://gsmch.ac.in/

Government Sivagangai Medical College and Hospital was started in 2012-13 in the Sivaganga district with an annual intake of 100 students for MBBS Course. The college was approved by Medical Council of India and it is affiliated to Tamil Nadu Dr. M.G.R. Medical University, Guindy, Chennai.

== History ==
Government Sivagangai Medical College & Hospital (GSMCH), Sivagangai was started on 1 March 2012, where students are selected by merit by the Government. The College is recognized by the Medical Council Of India and it is affiliated to the Tamil Nadu Dr. M.G.R. Medical University, Guindy, Chennai. This institution is located at Vaniyangudi village, Manamadurai Main road, about 4 km from the main town of Sivaganga and 13 km from town of Manamadurai on the by-pass of Manamadurai - Thanjavur State Highway. This is situated in a land of 30 acres and was built at a cost of 114 crores.

First Batch of 100 MBBS students were admitted in August 2012. The Hospital houses a 500 bedded ward to treat in-patients.

Government Sivagangai Medical College Hospital accommodates all the Broad speciality departments, Pre and para Clinical departments as per MCI norms.

This Hospital also has facilities such as advanced Operation Theatre facility, Emergency 24 hour Casualty, Trauma ward, Triage ward, in surgical field, Intensive Care Unit and Coronary Care Unit. Special facilities such as NICU, PICU wards have been established in Pediatrics Speciality to bring down the paediatric Mortality rate.

Chief Minister's Comprehensive Health Insurance Scheme, 108 Ambulance facility are some of the special services rendered by this medical College Hospital.

Students are provided with hostel facilities and the staffs are provided with staff quarters.

Sivaganga district is identified as one of the difficult areas for doctors to serve in Tamil Nadu by P. Umanath Committee and categorised this institution as Category A in 2017.

== Emblem ==
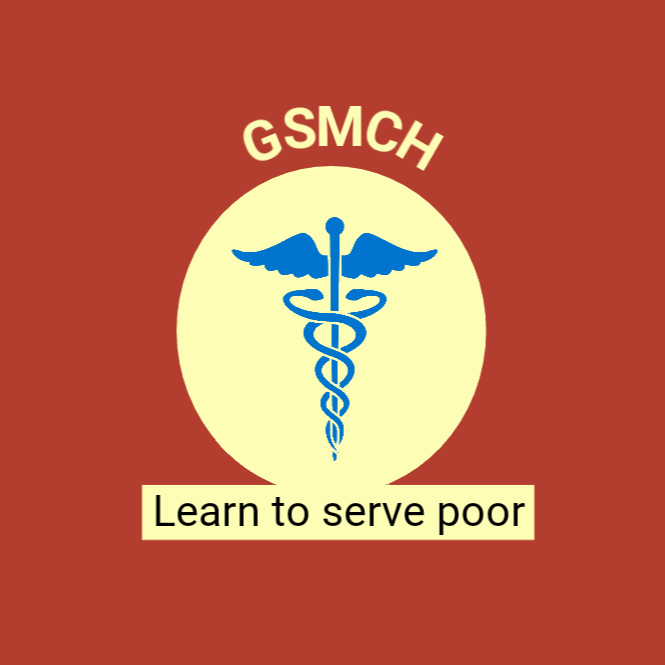
The official logo of Govt. Sivagangai Medical College

The Official Emblem of the college has the Caduceus and the words Learn To Serve Poor.

== Campus ==
This institution is located in outskirts of Sivagangai Municipality near Vaniyangudi Village on the Manamadurai Highway. This is situated in a land of 30 acres and was built at a cost of 114 crores.

The college premises includes OP block, Casualty block, CEmONC block, Trauma & Emergency block, Administrative block, Faculty block, Auditorium, Central Library, Lecture Halls (3x120), Examination Hall (1x250), Blood Bank, Mortuary, Quarters for Dean, RMO, ARMO, Professors, Asst. Professors, Residents, Nurses and Staffs, Separate Hostels for Boys, Girls & CRRI, Gymnasium, Cooperative Store, Cafeteria, Bank and Gas plant.

== Academics ==
=== Undergraduate Medical Course ===
- MBBS (100 Seats / Year)

=== Postgraduate Medical Course ===
- MD General Medicine (6 Seats / Year)
- MD Pediatrics (3 Seats / Year)
- MD Anesthesia (4 Seats / Year)
- MD Emergency Medicine (5 Seats / Year)
- MS General Surgery (2 Seats / Year)
- MS Obstetrics & Gynaecology (6 Seats / Year)

=== Paramedical Courses ===
- DMLT - Diploma in Medical Lab Technology - 100 Seats (2 Years)
- B. Sc. Radiography - 10 seats
- Dip. Radio diagnosis Technology - 10 seats
- Anesthesia technician (1 Years) 20 Seats
