= Radha Regent Hotel, Chennai =

Hotel in Chennai, India

Hotel Radha Regent Jawaharlal Nehru Salai
- Hotel chain: Radha Hotels

General information
- Location: Chennai, India, 171, Jawaharlal Nehru Salai, Arumbakkam; Chennai, Tamil Nadu 600 106
- Coordinates: 13°03′54.3528″N 80°12′38.1672″E
- Opening: 1997
- Owner: R. Srinivasan, KB Govindarajalu & Family

Height
- Height: 50 feet (15 m)

Technical details
- Floor count: 6

Design and construction
- Architect: Ramanan J
- Developer: Radha Regent Hotels Private Ltd.

Other information
- Number of rooms: 91
- Number of suites: 6
- Number of restaurants: 4
- Parking: 150 4-Wheelers

Website
- 12

Radha Regent Chennai, formerly Radha Park Inn, is a four-star hotel located at Arumbakkam in Chennai, India. The hotel is the second hotel of the Sarovar Hotels & Resorts in India and the first of star hotels to open on Inner Ring Road, Chennai. The hotel also opened Geoffrey's, the first pub of Chennai in 2001.

== Hotel ==
Opened in 1997, the hotel has a total of 91 rooms, including 62 superior rooms, 23 executive rooms, and 6 suites. The restaurants at the hotel include The Lobby Cafe, a multi-cuisine restaurant (Originally as Cafe at the park in 1997), The Orient Blossom, an Oriental delicacies restaurant opened in 2004, Geoffrey's Pub, and Aura, the lounge bar which was added in 2004 replacing its earlier counterpart Pub at the park. There are six banquet halls with a total space of 6,500 sq ft. The hotel also has introduced in 2013 a Garden Banquet lawn of 20,000 sq ft, Bougainville, which can accommodate 3,000 guests.

The hotel interiors were designed by Ramanan J in 1997 and in 2004 the Orient Blossom was designed by Mumbai-based Prakash Mankar & Associates.

The hotel developer Radha Regent Hotels have also opened two three-star hotels in Bangalore; Radha Hometel in Whitefield, Bangalore in 2005 and Radha Regent Hotel, Bangalore in Electronic City in 2008, the former being the first Hometel brand hotel of Sarovar Hotels & Resorts.

== Awards ==
- Sarovar Park Plaza Hotel of the Year, Presented by Sarovar Hotels & Resorts in 2004

== See also ==
- Hotels in Chennai
- Sarovar Hotels & Resorts
