= Government Mohan Kumaramangalam Medical College =

Indian medical college

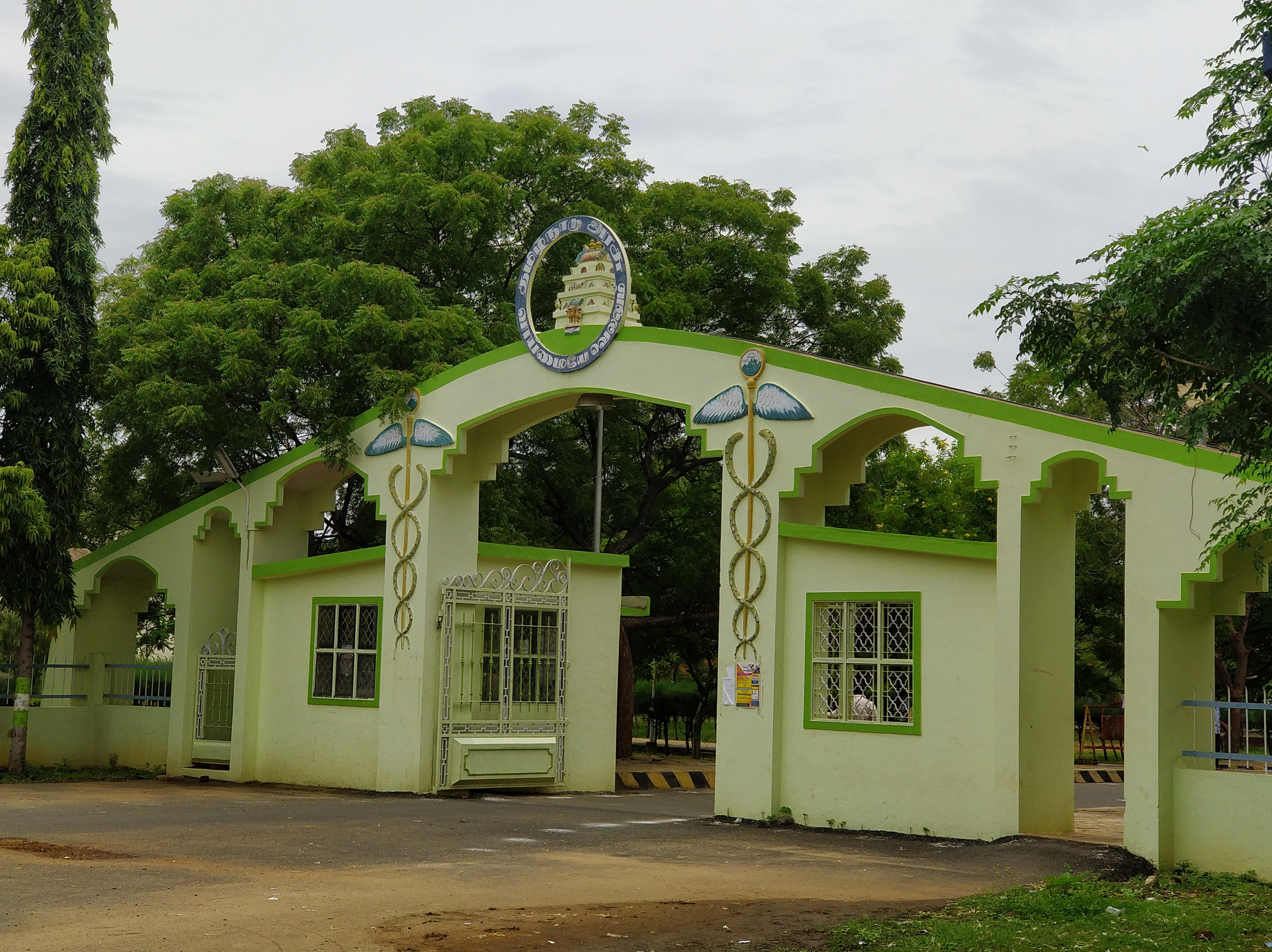
- Other name: GMKMC
- Type: Government Medical College and Hospital
- Established: 1986; 40 years ago
- Affiliations: The Tamil Nadu Dr. M.G.R. Medical University
- Dean: Dr. J. Devi Meenal
- Undergraduates: 100 places (year 2020)
- Postgraduates: 102 places (year 2020)
- Location: Salem, Tamil Nadu, India; 11.671576°N 78.067494°E
- Campus: College: semi-urban Hospital: urban
- Website: www.gmkmc.com

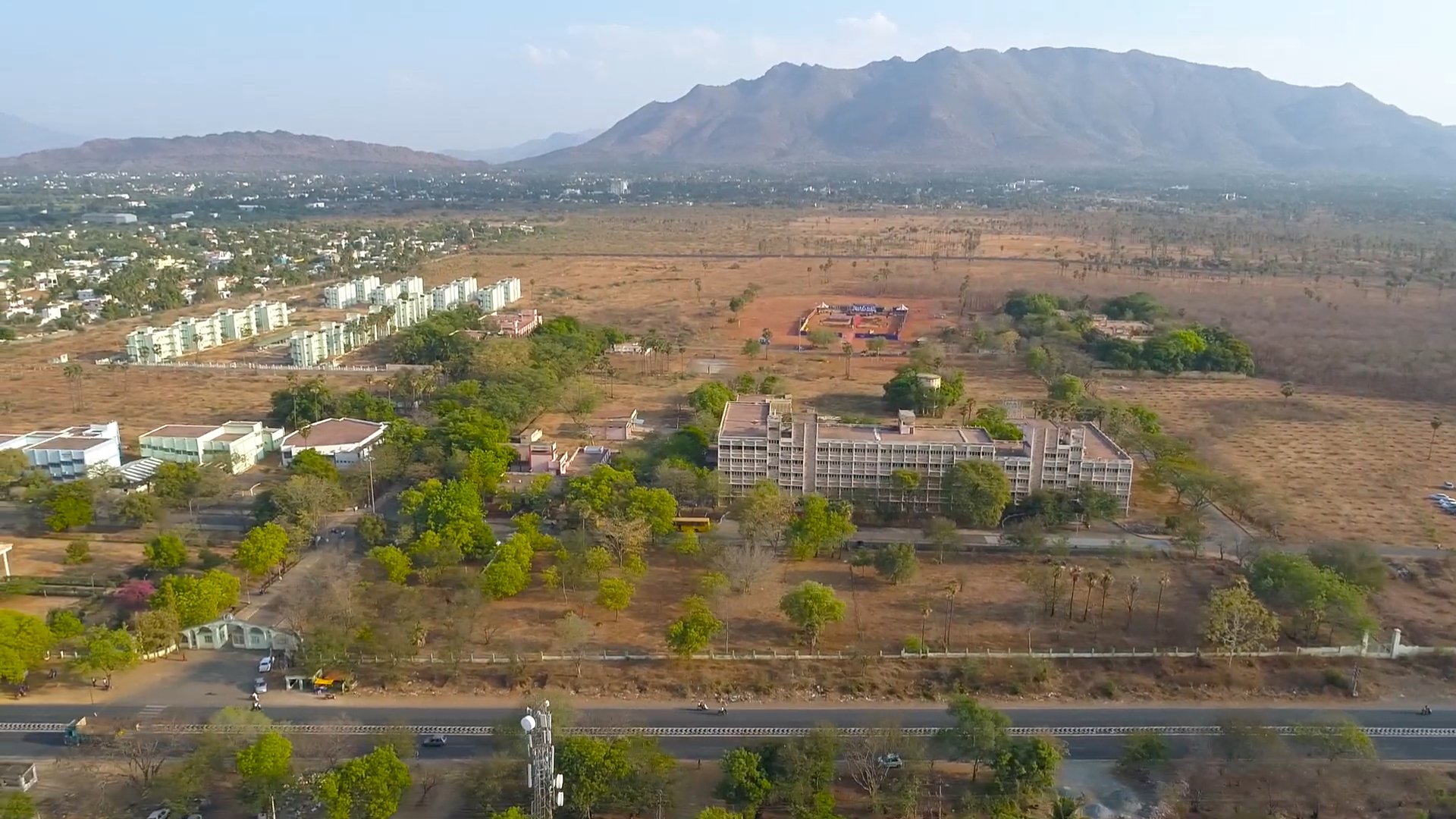
Aerial view of GMKMC with surrounding Mountains and greenery

Government Mohan Kumaramangalam Medical College is a Tamil Nadu government medical college established in 1986. The college is in Salem, Tamil Nadu, India, and is named after former Iron and Steel Minister of India Mohan Kumaramangalam. It is recognised by the Medical Council of India. The school enrolls 100 MBBS and 102 postgraduate medical students. Government Mohan Kumaramangalam Nursing College is situated on the campus in a separate building.

== History ==
The Salem government district hospital was built in 1913 by the British government. The campus spanned 13 acres. The hospital was to serve residents as well as British officers in the unified Salem district.

In October 1988, the groundbreaking for the Government Mohan Kumaramanagalam Medical College (GMKMC) was conducted by then-Indian Prime Minister Shri. Rajiv Gandhi. The college opened in 1990 and its first graduating class had only 65 MBBS students.

The Salem Medical College was named in honour of then steel minister Mohan Kumaramangalam, who was born in Kumaramangalam, an area near Thiruchengode (the then-unified Salem district, now part of the Namakkal district). In 2013, the number of undergraduate MBBS seats increased to 100. The college celebrated its silver jubilee in 2015.

== Facilities ==
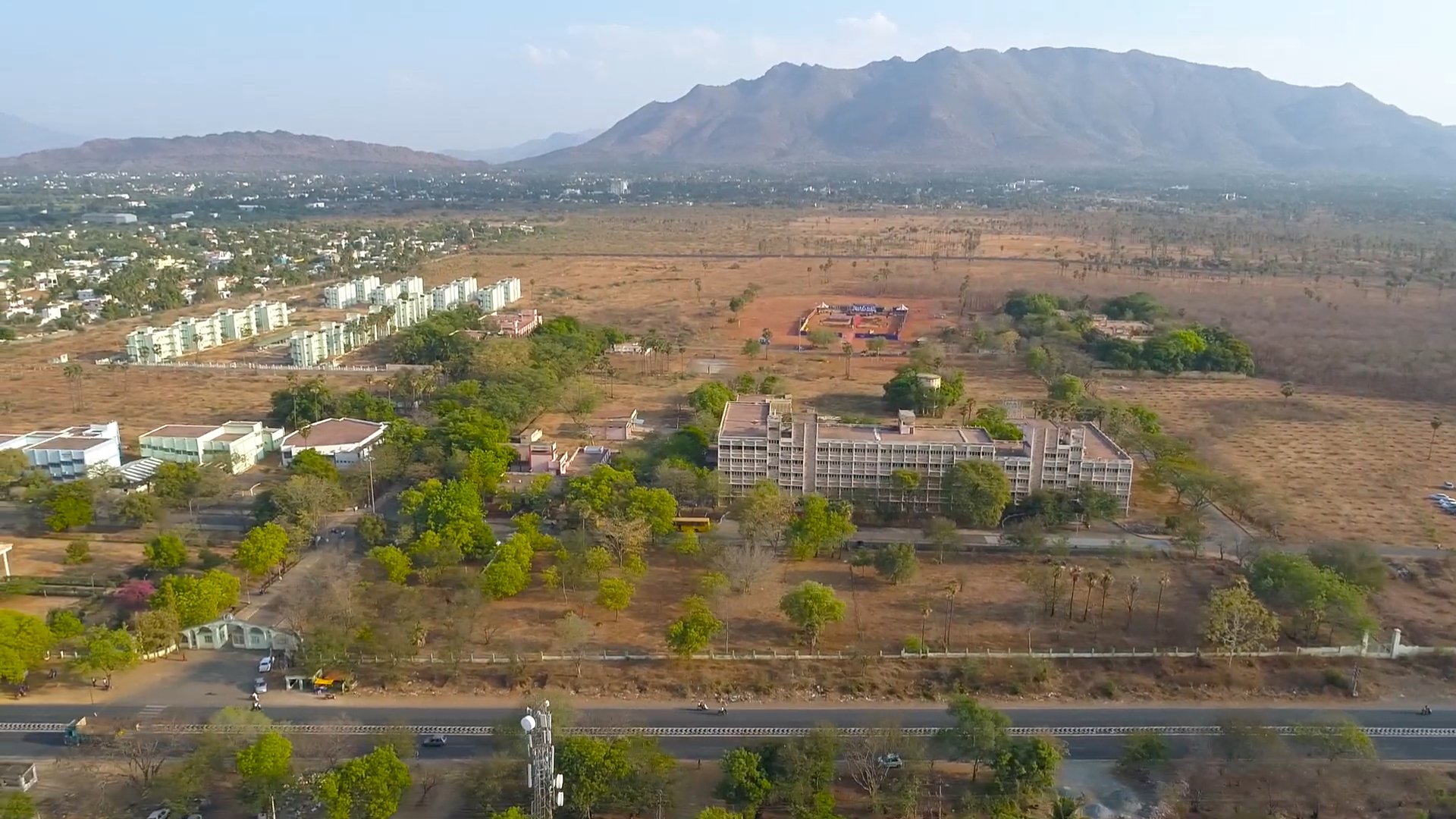
Aerial view of GMKMC with surrounding mountains

The college campus has 100 student classrooms in all the pre-clinical departments.

=== Pre-clinical departments ===
- Anatomy
- Physiology
- Biochemistry
- Pathology
- Pharmacology
- Microbiology
- Forensic medicine
- Preventive and social medicine.

=== Library ===
An air-conditioned library facility, accommodating almost 200 students at a single time is available. an 'own books' reading hall accommodates 70 students. A computer based e-Library is available with 40 computers. There is also an air-conditioned study hall for professors and other teaching staff, which accommodates 20 people at a time. Parking facilities for doctors and students are available outside the premises.

=== Hostel ===
Both gents and ladies hostels are available. Accommodation is free of cost. Food charges are born by students. Gents hostel holds 120 rooms. Ladies hostel holds 140 rooms. RO purified drinking water facility is available. Security personnel are posted round the clock for the safety of students. Hostel is surrounded by twelve-foot compound wall with fences. A large cricket cum football ground is available common for gents and ladies, with separate volleyball and basketball play area.

=== Bus facility ===
The college has buses, which takes clinical posting students daily to government hospital (GMKMCH) in Salem town, for their clinical postings. Bus facilities are free of cost. Apart from the college provided bus facility, there is a bus stop right out of the college campus where all local (government and private) as well as mofussil buses are available for travel from 4am to late night.

=== Auditorium ===
An auditorium (apart from two lecture halls) is available, where 350 students can be seated at a time, with sound systems and screening facilities. There is a garden around the auditorium.

=== Canteen ===
There is a canteen with a capacity of fifty. There is separate eating hall for Day scholar students where they can use it for lunch session. .

=== Examination hall ===
The examination hall can accommodate 500 students. CCTV cameras and cell jammers are present, with the CCTV feed being relayed to the TNMGRMU every time a university examination is held.

=== Animal house ===
An animal house building functions under the supervision of the Department of Pharmacology.

=== Nursing college ===
The campus nursing college educates 150 students in every batch. It has hostel facilities for ladies only.

=== Administrative block ===
In the admin block the dean, principal and other officials are present. Opened at 9am, during week days, works until 6pm.

=== Transport ===
Two college buses transport medical students and carries nursing students from the college to the hospital. The college campus is situated along the Salem Steel Plant (Tharamangalam) four-lane road. Buses connect the college to Salem Junction (within 5 km), the new Salem Central bus stand (within 7 km), and the old Salem Town bus stand (within 10 km).

Salem Junction is the divisional headquarters of Salem on the Southern railway and a junction of five railway lines. It has trains to Chennai, Erode, Coimbatore, Trichy, Virudachalam, Madurai, etc.

Salem Airport provides air connectivity to Chennai. Salem is the intersection of highway roads from Coimbatore, Bangalore, Karur, and Chennai.

== Glanzendo-National level medical quiz ==
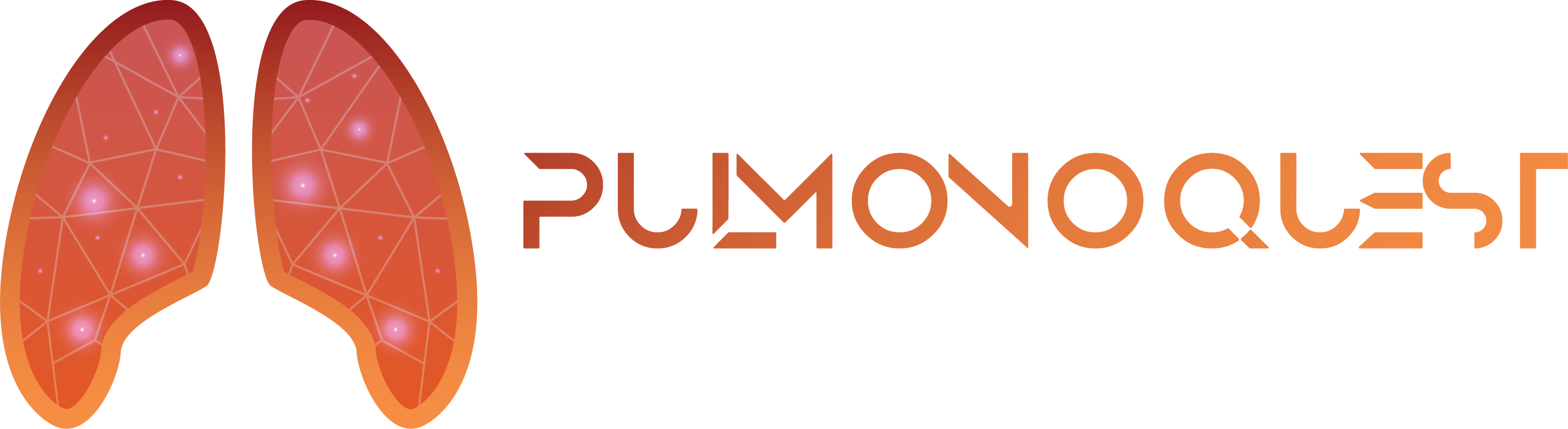

GLANZENDO is a national level grand intercollegiate quiz contest conducted by Govt. Mohan Kumaramangalam Medical College, Salem every year. It has been conducted for more than six successive years. Glanzendo 6.0 - Pulmonoquest was the first national level quiz conducted by Xorvianzz'17 with participation from more than 23 states and union territories. It had 1100 teams and 3300 participants.

== Counselling status ==
Seats are filled on par with KAPV Medical College, Trichy and Tirunelveli Medical College, Tirunelveli

Courses:

MBBS-100 seats

=== MD courses ===
- General medicine-16
- Paediatrics-8
- Anesthesia-9
- Psychiatry-5
- Radiology -3
- Forensic medicine and toxicology-3
- Pathology-6
- Microbiology-3
- Biochemistry-3
- Emergency medicine- 3

=== MS courses ===
- General surgery - 12
- Obstetrics and gynaecology-10
- Orthopaedics-10
- Ophthalmology-2
- ENT-2

=== DM courses ===
- Neurology-2
- Cardiology-2
- Nephrology-2
- Medical gastroenterology -2

=== MCh courses ===
- Neurosurgery-2
- Paediatric surgery-2
- Gastrointestinal surgery-2
- Plastic and reconstructive surgery-2
- Urology-4

== Hospital ==
GMC is affiliated to GMKMCH, a tertiary care super-speciality hospital with around 2000 beds, 9 km from the college campus. The hospital spans over 13 acres opposite the Salem District Collector Office.

=== Superspeciality block ===
The super-specialty block in the hospital campus adopted a green building model, similar to Delhi AIIMS. It houses all super specialty departments and an apex trauma center. The inpatient biochemistry, pathology and microbiology laboratories are in the same building. The super speciality block contains a centralised air-conditioning system and a conference hall. It houses departments of neurology, neurosurgery, cardiology, cardio-thoracic surgery, nephrology, urology, plastic surgery, endocrine surgery, and pediatric surgery. An OPD block with consulting rooms, demonstration halls, x-ray units, minor OT and an outpatient laboratory are present. Separate buildings are present for departments of internal medicine, general surgery, ophthalmology, radiotherapy, ENT Surgery, ICTC and ART, RNTCP, TB ward and psychiatry.

=== OBGYN ===
A Reproductive and Child Health (RCH) center housing the departments of paediatrics, obstetrics, and gynaecology is considered a 'center of excellence'. More than 1000 babies are born every month in the RCH center, making it one of the biggest mother and child hospitals in Tamil Nadu. CEmONC, O&G casualty and OBG ICU are other departments.

GMKMCH has an institute of diabetology and an institute of burns. The Central Government-sponsored VDRL Laboratory is there.

The hospital has around 20 operating rooms and separate Intensive Care Units for various departments: MICU (Medical ICU), PACU (Post anaesthetic ICU), SICU (Surgical ICU), PICU (Paediatric ICU), NICU (Neonatal ICU), Superspeciality ICU, and ICCU.

A DEIC (District Early Intervention and Counselling) OP under the RBSK Scheme is present on the campus. A block for forensic science and toxicology with lecture halls, mortuary and autopsy rooms are available. Hostels for resident doctors, postgraduate students are on the hospital campus.

== COVID-19 ==
Two RT-PCR testing centre for testing COVID-19 has been established with a testing capacity of 6,000 samples per day under the supervision of the Department of Microbiology. GMKMC is CHO for Salem district. It has around 1,500 COOVID beds in which 1,150 beds are oxygenated. The hospital also administers an oxygenated 1,000 bedded camp in the Salem Steel Plant campus.
