= Government Villupuram Medical College =

Government Villupuram Medical College & Hospital
- Established: 2010; 16 years ago
- Academic affiliations: The Tamil Nadu Dr. M.G.R. Medical University
- Dean: Dr. K. Ramadevi
- Students: MBBS - 100/year MD/MS - 40/year Para Medical Degree - 140/year Para Medical Diploma - 130/year
- Location: GST Road, Mundiyampakkam Village,, Villupuram, Tamil Nadu, India; 11.590360°N 79.310500°E
- Website: www.vmcvpm.ac.in

The Government Villupuram Medical College is an educational institution established in 2010 in Mundiyampakkam village in the Indian state of Tamil Nadu. The college accepts 100 MBBS students per year, of which 85 are state quota seats and 15 are from the All India quota. The college also accepts 140 allied health science/paramedical degree students and 130 allied health science/diploma students per year. It is a National Medical Commission (NMC) recognized medical college.

Post Graduate Medical Degree Courses have been offered by this institution since the academic year of 2019-20 under 5 specialties totaling an annual intake of 40 students per year.

Apart from medical courses, the medical college also operates as a recognized training center for nursing students.

The college has a capacity of 650 teaching beds and 500 non-teaching beds for patient care. It includes an emergency ward under the Tamil Nadu Accident and Emergency Care Initiative(TAEI) as well as specialty departments including oncology, Surgical Gastroenterology, Nephrology, urology, and pediatric surgery. This hospital has Central Laboratory, CT/MRI scan center, Mammography unit apart from the routine X-Ray and Ultrasonogram Services.

This college is affiliated with The Tamil Nadu Dr. MGR Medical University, Guindy, Chennai and the administration is governed by the Directorate of Medical Education, Department of Health & Family Welfare, Government of Tamil Nadu.

== Hostel facilities ==
The college has separate male and female on-campus hostel facilities for 500 MBBS students, interns and Post graduates. It also has family quarters for doctors and nurses.

== Central library ==
The 1600 square meter central library was built with seating for 100 students. It held 7000 textbooks and reference books as of 2015 along with 100 medical journals.

This Library also has an online e-Library facility with the access to national and international online journals.

== Medical education unit ==
The Medical Education Unit (MEU) is located on the third floor of the college building. It can accommodate 250 seats. The MEU contains audio-visual aids, computers with internet facilities and CD-Books. Medical Council of India Regulation on graduate Medical Education 1997 emphasized that faculty members should employ modern education technology. To attain this objective, medical education units/departments should be established for faculty development and provide learning resource material for teachers. Due to this directive from MCI, the MEU has been created at Government Villupuram Medical college.

== Health insurance scheme ==
As part of the initiative of Government of Tamil Nadu, the Chief Ministers Comprehensive Health Insurance scheme (CMCHIS) is being run in this hospital.
