= Government Dharmapuri Medical College =

- Established: 2008; 18 years ago
- Affiliations: National Medical Commission
- Academic affiliations: Tamil Nadu Dr. M.G.R. Medical University
- Dean: Dr. T. M. Manohar
- Undergraduates: 100
- Location: Nethaji Bye Pass Road, Dharmapuri, Dharmapuri, Tamil Nadu, India; 12.122°N 78.156°E
- Website: www.dmcdpi.ac.in

The Government Dharmapuri Medical College is an educational institution established in 2008 at Nethaji Bye Pass Road within Dharmapuri Municipality in Indian state of Tamil Nadu. The college accepts 100 students per year, of which 85 are state quota seats and 15 are from the All India quota. It is a National Medical Commission recognized medical college. The Foundation stone was laid down by the then deputy CM, M. K. Stalin, on 19 January 2010. The hospital has performed around 3000 surgeries under the Chief Minister's Comprehensive Health Insurance Scheme.

== Hospital Services ==
It has OPD & IPD services. It includes well equipped operation theatre with laboratory & blood bank services.

special clinics are being conducted.

1. Club Foot clinic - every Saturday.
2. Congenital Defects Screening Clinic - every Friday.
3. Hypertension Clinic - every Tuesday and Thursday
4. Diabetic Clinic - every Tuesday and Thursday.
5. Transgender Clinic - every Monday and Saturday.
6. Glaucoma Clinic - every Monday and Saturday.
7. Cornea Clinic - every Monday and Saturday.
8. Teen Clinic - every Saturday.
