= Alur, Nanded =

Village in Maharashtra

Alur Aloor
- village
- Location in Maharashtra, India Alur (India)
- Coordinates: 18°38′22″N 077°40′22″E
- Country: India
- State: Maharashtra
- District: Nanded
- Taluka: Deglur

Government
  - Body: Village panchayat
- Elevation: 358 m (1,175 ft)

Population (2001)
  - Total: 2,669

Languages
  - Official: Marathi
- Time zone: UTC+5:30 (IST)
- PIN: 431723
- Lok Sabha constituency: Nanded
- Vidhan Sabha constituency: Deglur

Alur is a panchayat village in the state of Maharashtra, India. Administratively, Alur is under Deglur Taluka of Nanded District in Maharashtra. There is only the single village of Alur in the Alur gram panchayat. The village of Alur is 25 km by road northeast of the town of Deglur and 47 km by road south-southwest of the town of Dharmabad.

== Demographics ==
In the 2001 census, the village of Alur had 2,669 inhabitants, with 1,360 males (51.0%) and 1,309 females (49.0%), for a gender ratio of 963 females per thousand males.
