= Aloor, Tamil Nadu =

Aloor
- town
- Location in Tamil Nadu, India Aloor (India)
- Coordinates: 8°12′8″N 77°21′42″E
- Country: India
- State: Tamil Nadu
- District: Kanniyakumari

Population (2001)
  - Total: 12,964

Languages
  - Official: Tamil
- Time zone: UTC+5:30 (IST)
- Postal code: 629801

–

Aloor is a town in Kanyakumari district in the state of Tamil Nadu, India. It is about 8 km from Nagercoil, the Headquarters of Kanyakumari District. In the Tamil Nadu State Legislative Assembly, it belongs to Colachel constituency.

Aloor is situated on the Nagercoil - Thiruvananthapuram rail route and has a small Railway Station. The Nagercoil - Thiruvananthapuram passenger train halts at Aloor Station. Aloor is also close to the Kanyakumari - Thiruvananthapuram section of National Highway 66.

Aloor commands a scenic view of the Western Ghats close to Nagercoil and is also a lush green area. Several Engineering and other Colleges situated just outside Nagercoil are easily accessible from Aloor. The Kanyakumari Government Medical College is 4.2 km from Aloor.

From October 2021, Aloor and Thengampudur town panchayats were integrated into the Nagercoil Corporation.

== Demographics ==
As of 2001 India census, Aloor had a population of 12,964.
