= Mundiyampakkam =

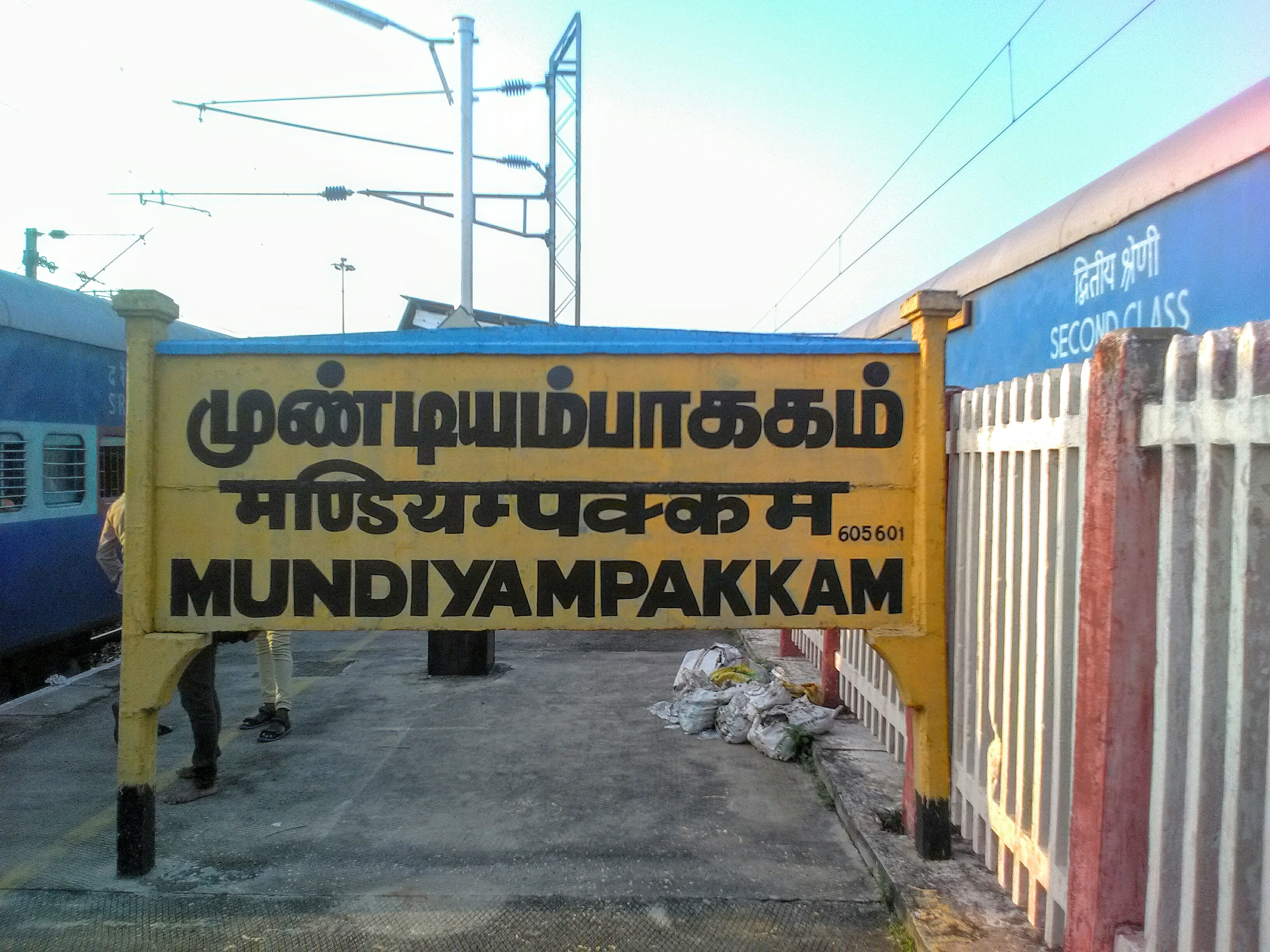
Mundiyampakkam Railway Station

Mundiyampakkam is a village in the Viluppuram district of the State of Tamil Nadu in India. The Government Villupuram Medical College is located here.

Mundiyampakkam is located 7 km from Villupuram and 5 km from Vikravandi. NH45 passes through this village.

Around 2000 families live in Mundiyampakkam. The village has a sugars and chemical factory, a rail goods shed, and two hotels.
