= Madurai Medical College =

Medial school in Madurai, Tamil Nadu, India

- Type: Government
- Established: 1954; 72 years ago
- Affiliations: Tamil Nadu Dr. M.G.R. Medical University, NMC
- Dean: Dr. Arul Kumar Sundaresh
- Academic staff: 200
- Administrative staff: 600
- Undergraduates: 250 per year (MBBS)
- Postgraduates: 100 per year
- Location: Madurai, Tamil Nadu, India; 9.927849°N 78.136822°E
- Campus: Urban, 18.39 acres
- Website: http://www.mdmc.tn.gov.in/

Madurai Medical College is a medical school attached to the Government Rajaji Hospital in Madurai, Tamil Nadu, India. The hospital provides tertiary care to more than twenty million people in the southern part of Tamil Nadu. The hospital was established in 1842 and became a teaching hospital in 1954. The hospital was formerly known as Erskine's Hospital.

Madurai Medical College is affiliated to Tamil Nadu Dr. M.G.R. Medical University and is recognised by the World Health Organization. It is most busiest hospital in state of Tamil Nadu also it is the only hospital in the State to have doctors available 24x7 in all speciality departments.

The hospital is not only centre of excellence in Southern Tamil Nadu but also in the State for various surgeries. It serves as a tertiary level referral hospital to all the medical college Hospitals of Southern and Central Tamil Nadu. Open heart, closed heart surgeries and valve replacement are performed in this hospital. Master Health Check-up is available. This hospital provides 24 hours casualty facility, 24 hours bio-chemistry lab facility, CT Scan and MRI Scan facility and so on. It provides tertiary care with the comprehensive health insurance scheme by the government of Tamil Nadu.

== History ==
The college was inaugurated on 2 August 1954 by the then chief minister K. Kamaraj and the union health minister Rajkumari Amrit Kaur. K. P. Sarathy was the first special officer and Sarah J. Sowri was the first principal. The college was affiliated to the University of Madras and permanent recognition was accorded in 1954. Subsequently, the recognition of Medical Council of India (now National Medical Commission) came in 1961.

The college was then situated at the old Taluk building, Fair Weather road. The present building was occupied in 1958. In 1963, Dr. C. K. Padmanabha Menon became its first dean. It celebrated the Silver Jubilee in 1979 and Golden Jubilee in 2004.

When the Madurai Kamaraj University was established, the college was affiliated to it. When the Tamil Nadu Dr. M.G.R. Medical University was started, the college like other medical colleges in the state was affiliated to it.

The college is spread over an area of 18.93 acres, with 360 teaching staff.

== Courses ==
Courses offered include Bachelor of Medicine and Bachelor of Surgery(MBBS), Bachelor of Pharmacy (B.Pharm), Master of Pharmacy (M.Pharm), Diploma in Pharmacy (D.pharm), Nursing, and other para-medical courses. Selection is based on performance in the NEET.The college offers postgraduate degrees in medical and surgical specialities (Doctor of Medicine, Master of Surgery), Post Graduate Diplomas (Doctor of Osteopathic Medicine, DCH, DGO, DLO etc.) and some super specialities.

Madurai Medical College is one of the oldest medical colleges next to Madras Medical College.

== Clinical services ==
Clinical services are provided by the Government Rajaji Hospital which is a 2,518 bedded Super Speciality Hospital providing free health care to people in the lower income group. It was opened in 1842 and moved into its present premises on 31 August 1940. It was named after Lord Erskine (Governor of Madras Presidency in 1930s). The Erskine Hospital was inaugurated in November 1940 by Sir Arthur Hope, the then Governor of Madras. In 1956 the hospital became a teaching hospital, being attached to the college. It was renamed as Government Rajaji Hospital in January 1980.
