= Kanyakumari Government Medical College =

Medical education institution in Nagercoil, Tamil Nadu, India

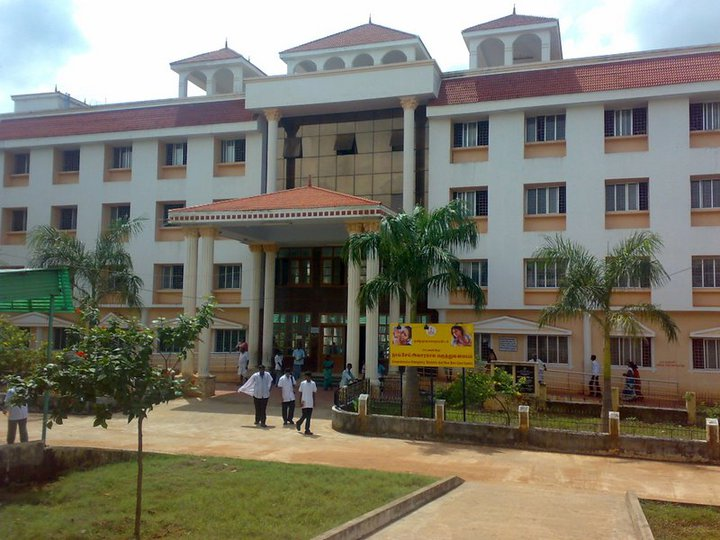
- Other name: KGMC
- Motto: "Cure, Care, Console"
- Type: Government Medical College and Hospital
- Established: 2001; 25 years ago
- Academic affiliations: Tamil Nadu Dr. MGR Medical University
- Dean: Leo David
- Faculty: 200 (approx.)
- Administrative staff: 600 (approx.)
- Undergraduates: 150 per year (MBBS)
- Postgraduates: 48 per year (MD & MS); 5 per year (DM & MCh)
- Location: Asaripallam, Kanyakumari District, Tamil Nadu, India; 8°10′25.94″N 77°23′37.96″E
- Campus: 100 acres (40 ha)
- Website: kgmc.ac.in

Kanyakumari Government Medical College, also known as KGMC, is a public medical college in the city of Nagercoil, Tamil Nadu, India. The college is affiliated to Tamil Nadu Dr. MGR Medical University and is recognised by the National Medical Commission.

== History ==
The Govt. T.B. Hospital campus at Asaripallam, Nagercoil in Kanyakumari District was selected as the site for the proposed Government Medical College. As per the Medical Council of India's instructions that the medical college and hospital should occupy the same campus, there is also a 500-bed hospital. The first batch of MBBS commenced in the year 2004.

Nearly 500 medical students and many paramedic students are in training in this institution at any time.

== Administration ==
The college is affiliated with the Tamil Nadu Dr. MGR Medical University. The college and the hospital are funded and managed by the Government of Tamil Nadu.

== Hospital ==
The multi-speciality government hospital is open to public 24 hours throughout the year. Serves as the tertiary care centre for the district. The hospital has several blocks. The Out-Patient block has high footfall every day. A Heritage Block dedicated for Super speciality OPD is located behind the central park. There are two major In-Patient Blocks located behind the OPD. The main block has wards dedicated to gynaecology and obstetrics, paediatrics, orthopaedics, ENT, cancer and has two operation theatres along with the 24-hour laboratory. The CT and MRI scan facilities are available in the basement.

The Additional Block has the medical and surgical wards their intensive care units. It also houses the Radiology and Anaesthesia departments. The block has three operation theatres with the latest instruments. The X-Ray, USG, ECHO, Bronchoscopy, EEG diagnostic facilities are available in the ground floor.

The hospital has a dedicated block for Ophthalmology with its own operating theatre. Separate blocks for casualty and emergency wards, Thoracic medicine ward, Dermatology, Psychiatry, Septic, Gastroenterology, Isolation, ART centre, RNTCP centre, Blood Bank, are present inside the vast campus.

A 24-hour Police station is present within the campus along with a mortuary. The drugs dispensary is located near the rear gate

== Academics ==
The college has lecture halls and classrooms with projectors and digital boards along with an examination hall. The main Faculty Block present opposite the central park, has the departments of Anatomy, Forensic Medicine, Physiology, Pathology, Pharmacology, Community Medicine (with Tele-Medicine), Microbiology and Biochemistry with their respective laboratories. The wards and OPD also have attached classrooms and demo rooms for clinical classes.

== Student Facilities ==
A large auditorium is located near the entrance which holds the annual cultural events, graduation ceremonies, medical education programmes etc. Separate hostels with good infrastructure and hygienic food with recreational facilities are available for boys and girls. CRRIs and Post-Graduates have independent-room hostels with a separate mess along with a common-room for day scholars with lockers and restrooms. Free Wifi facility is being provided for the students.

Sports facilities like table-tennis, football cum cricket ground, volleyball, basketball and badminton courts are provided.

== Courses ==
The college offers a 5.5-year Bachelor of Medicine, Bachelor of Surgery (MBBS) degree, as well as a diploma in Nursing (GNM) and a diploma in Medical Lab Technology (DMLT), 4 year Bachelor of Science (B.Sc Paramedical) in Renal Dialysis technology (From 2018 onwards).In the year 2018 -2019 post-graduate courses have started.

The college offers post-graduate courses in General Medicine, General surgery, Anaesthesia, Obstetrics and gynaecology, Paediatrics , Orthopaedics, Emergency Medicine, Ophthalmology and Otorhinolaryngology.
