= Department of Health and Family Welfare (Tamil Nadu) =

Government agency in Tamil Nadu, India

Agency overview
- Jurisdiction: Tamil Nadu
- Headquarters: Chennai
- Employees: 121,221 (2019)
- Annual budget: ₹15,773 crore (US$1.6 billion) (2020–21)
- Minister responsible: Dr. K.G. Arunraj, Minister for Health and Family Welfare Department
- Agency executive: Dr. Darez Ahamed, IAS, Additional Chief Secretary
- Parent agency: Government of Tamil Nadu
- Website: tnhealth.tn.gov.in

The Department of Health and Family Welfare is one of the departments of Government of Tamil Nadu and is responsible for ensuring access to basic public health services in the state.

== Objective ==
The responsibility of the department is to make quality medical facilities available and accessible to the people, to focus on preventing diseases and to promote adoption of healthy life style.

== Overview ==
The state has robust health facilities and ranks higher in all health related parameters such as high life expectancy of 74 years (sixth) and 98.4% institutional delivery (second). Of the three demographically related targets of the Millennium Development Goals set by the United Nations and expected to be achieved by 2015, Tamil Nadu achieved the goals related to improvement of maternal health and of reducing infant mortality and child mortality by 2009.

== Infrastructure ==
The public health infrastructure in the state includes both government-run hospitals and health centers managed by the department of health. As of 2023, the state had 404 public hospitals, 1,776 public dispensaries, 11,030 health centers and 481 mobile units run by the government with a capacity of more than 94,700 beds. The General Hospital in Chennai was established on 16 November 1664 and was the first major hospital in India. Tamil Nadu is a major center for medical tourism and Chennai is termed as "India's health capital". Medical tourism forms an important part of the economy with more than 40% of total medical tourists visiting India making it to Tamil Nadu.

== Medical education ==
There are over 870 medical, nursing and dental colleges in the state including 21 for traditional medicine and four for modern medicine of which 79 public medical colleges and research institutes are run by the department. Madras Medical College was established in 1835 and is one of the oldest medical colleges in India. As per the National Institutional Ranking Framework (NIRF) rankings in 2023, eight medical colleges from the state are ranked amongst the top 100 in the country.

== Other services ==
The department is responsible for the administration of vaccination such as free polio vaccine for eligible age groups and COVID-19 vaccine. The department is also responsible for the implementation of state health insurance scheme for eligible beneficiaries. The department also manages and runs emergency care ambulances across the state. It is also engaged in prevention, education and treatment of specific diseases such as AIDS and Tuberculosis. The department also manages special undertakings responsible for maternal and neonatal health, mental health and welfare of the blind. Food safety and inspection, drug approval and control are also functions under the purview of the health department.

== Sub-departments ==
The following sub-departments and undertakings operate under the department:

Sub-departments

- Department of Food Safety & Drug Administration (DFSDA)
- Directorate of Drugs Control (DDC)
- Directorate of Family Welfare (DFW)
- Directorate of Indian Medicine and Homeopathy (DIMH)
- Directorate of Medical Education (DME)
- Directorate of Medical and Rural Health Services (DMRHS)
- Directorate of Public Health and Preventive Medicine (DPHPM)
- National Rural Health Mission (NRHM)
- Tamil Nadu State Health Transport Department (TSHTD)

Undertakings and bodies

- Medicinal Plant Farms and Herbal Medicine Corporation (TAMPCOL)
- Tamil Nadu Health System Project (TNHSP)
- Tamil Nadu Medical Services Corporation Limited (TNMSC)
- Tamil Nadu State AIDS Control Society (TSAIDS)
- Tamil Nadu State Blindness Control Society (TSBCS)
- Transplant Authority of Tamil Nadu (TRANSTAN)

== Ministers ==
Ministers Health and Family Welfare (Tamil Nadu)
Name	Portrait	Term of office	
A. B. Shetty		13 April 1954	13 April 1957
Jothi Venkatachalam		1962	1963
S. J. Sadiq Pasha		6 March 1967	10 February 1969
V. R. Nedunchezhiyan		10 February 1969	4 January 1971
K. Anbazhagan		15 March 1971	31 January 1976
M. G. Ramachandran (Chief Minister)		30 June 1977	6 May 1978
R. Soundararajan		7 May 1978	17 February 1980
Dr. H.V.Hande		9 June 1980	21 October 1986
P. U. Shanmugam		22 October 1986	30 January 1988
K. Ponmudy		27 January 1989	30 January 1991
S. Muthusamy		24 June 1991	12 May 1996
Arcot N. Veeraswami		13 May 1996	13 May 2001
S. Semmalai		22 May 2001	2 June 2003
Thalavai Sundaram		3 June 2003	12 May 2006
M. R. K. Panneerselvam		13 May 2006	15 May 2011
Dr. V.S.Vijay		16 May 2011	27 February 2013
K. C. Veeramani		28 February 2013	31 October 2013
Dr. C.Vijaya Baskar		1 November 2013	6 May 2021
M. Subramaniam		7 May 2021	9 May 2026
Dr. K.G. Arunraj		10 May 2026	Incumbent

== See also ==
- Government of Tamil Nadu
- Tamil Nadu Government's Departments
- Ministry of Health and Family Welfare (India)
