= Arumbakkam =

Neighborhood of Chennai, India

- Neighbourhood
- Location within Chennai Location within Tamil Nadu Location within India
- Coordinates: 13.0724°N 80.2102°E
- Country: India
- State: Tamil Nadu
- District: Chennai
- Metro: Chennai

Government
  - Body: CMDA
- Elevation: 60 m (200 ft)

Languages
  - Official: Tamil
- Time zone: UTC+5:30 (IST)
- PIN: 600106
- Vehicle registration: TN-02
- Planning agency: CMDA

Arumbakkam is a residential locality in Chennai.

== The locality ==
Arumbakkam is notable for D G Vaishnav College. The Chennai Bottling Company (popularly known as the Gold Spot Company) was located here, which has now been converted into a car dealership. The locality is surrounded by Koyambedu, Aminjikarai and Anna Nagar. Other important locations are the Varadharraja Perumal Temple (built 500 years ago) and the Vinayagar Temple.

The Tamil Nadu Pollution Control Board (TNPCB) is located here. The Jai Nagar park and the State Election Commission of India, the headquarters of the Tamil Nadu Election Commission, are located opposite the CMBT.

The area is relatively rich in ground water, and it is said that this area was a mango-cultivating area until around 1960. This area falls under the Central Chennai constituency. It is a low-lying area and used to get waterlogged frequently till the late 1990s, after which improvements in the storm water drainage system, has considerably reduced waterlogging.

Resettlement of 247 families from Arumbakkam who were found encroached in that area, was done near Pulianthope and other areas of Chennai.

== Location in context ==
=== Hospitals ===
- Smile Zone Dental Clinic
- Siva Medicals, Valluvar Salai
- Prakash Dental Centre
- Kavitha Neuro Clinic
- Dr.Raj's Advanced Dental & Medical Centre
- Tamil Nadu Alluarjun fans association office
- Speed Medical Centre & Hospitals
- Indian Hospital
- Appaswamy Hospital
- Vasanthi Orthaeopadics

=== Residencial Colonies ===
- Jaganathan Nagar
- SBI Officers Colony
- SBI Staff Colony
- Jai Nagar
- Mangali Nagar
- MMDA Colony

=== Mall ===
- Megamart on P.H. road

=== Churches ===
- Blessing Worship Centre -(Behind Vasanthi Orthopaedic Hospital and M.R Hospital)
- ECI church
- Assemblies of God Arumbakkam
- Miracle healing center

=== Mosques ===
- In PH road, opposite to pollution control board
- Peter Raja St., opposite to Anna Arch
- MGR st., MMDA Colony

=== Temples ===
- Sri Panchali Amman Temple
- Sri Aadhi Parasakthi Amman Temple
- Sri Siddhi Vinayaga Temple
- Sri Vethapureeswara Sivan temple
- Sri Sundara Vinayagar Temple
- Sri Bala Vinayagar Temple
- Sri Sathya Varadharaja Perumal Temple
- Sri Uthaantchiyamman Temple
- Sri Muthu Mariyamman Temple
- Muthumariamman Temple
- Nagathammal Temple
- Santha Perumal Temple
- Sri Devi Elankaliamman Temple
- Periathupalai Amman Koil

== Architectural Sites ==
- Anna Arch (built by MGR in memory of his mentor C.N. Annadurai)
- Anna Arch Fly over

== Educational institutions ==
=== Colleges ===
- KM Music Conservatory
- D.G.Vaishnav College( Arts & Science).

=== Schools ===
- MMDA, Government Higher Secondary School
- Kola Perumal Chetty Vaishnav Senior Secondary School (CBSE)
- Narayana E-Techno School(CBSE)
- Srimathi Maharanibai Jamunadoss Vaishnav Higher Secondary School
- Good Hope Matriculation Higher Secondary School
- National Star Matriculation Higher Secondary School
- Ambal Matriculation School
- Daniel Thomas Matric. Hr. Sec. School
- Mohammad Sathak Matriculation Higher Secondary School

=== Digital Marketing Institute ===
Web Wisez - Digital Marketing Institute in Chennai

== Other Important Landmarks ==
In Arumbakkam

- Jai Nagar park opposite CMBT
- Tamil Nadu pollution control board (TNPCB) in PH road
- Chennai Metro Rail Limited has started its construction work in Arumbakkam with the pile foundation work
- Arumbakkam will also have its own Metro Station (somewhere between SAF Games Village and Radha regent)
- Tamil Nadu Election Commission has opened its brand new office in arumbakkam opposite CMBT
- The Arumbakkam Koyambedu Roundabout was converted into a Multi Level, Partial Cloverleaf grade separator in 2011

Around Arumbakkam

- Chennai Moffusil Bus Terminus (CMBT), one of Asia's Largest Bus Terminus, is just across the 100 feet Road opposite to Arumbakkam.
- Ampa Skywalk, a Shopping Mall opened on the Nelson Manickam Road — P.H.Road Junction.
- A flyover is built in this junction to ease the traffic.
- Ozone Mall is another mall that is coming up in Anna Nagar and is very close to the Arumbakkam Koyambedu Roundana
