= Kappalur =

- Village
- Location in Tamil Nadu, India Kappalur (India)
- Coordinates: 9.838177°N 78.0253371°E
- Country: India
- State: Tamil Nadu
- District: Madurai district

Government
  - Body: Village Panchayat

Population
  - Total: 3,250

Languages
  - Official: Tamil
- Time zone: UTC+5:30 (IST)
- Postal code: 606751
- Vehicle registration: TN25

Kappalur is a suburban area in Madurai district of Tamil Nadu, India. It is 16 kilometres (9.9 mi) South of district headquarters Madurai, and 4 kilometres (2.5 mi) from the nearby town Tirumangalam, Madurai.

== Basic Information ==
Kappalur Local Administration is situated in Tirumangalam Circle in the district of Madurai. Kappalur has a Toll Plaza. Proposed AIIMS hospital site is located nearby. The government has created Utchapatti-Thoppur satellite Township in Kappalur. Kappalur SIDCO (Small Industries Development Corporation Ltd.) Industrial estate has many polymer and houseware manufacturing units, industrial engineering service units, etc.
