= Madurai =

City in Tamil Nadu, India

- Metropolis
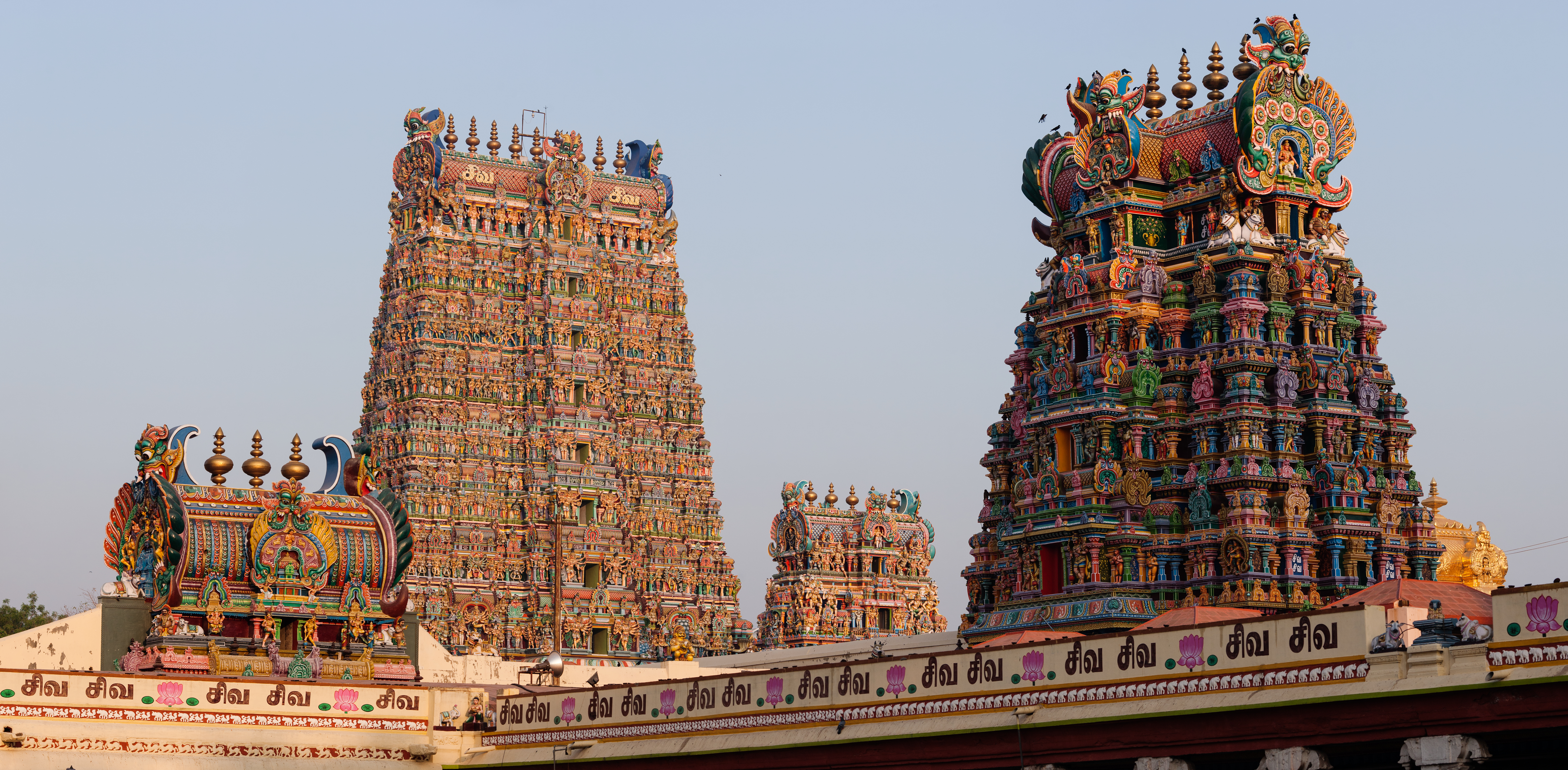
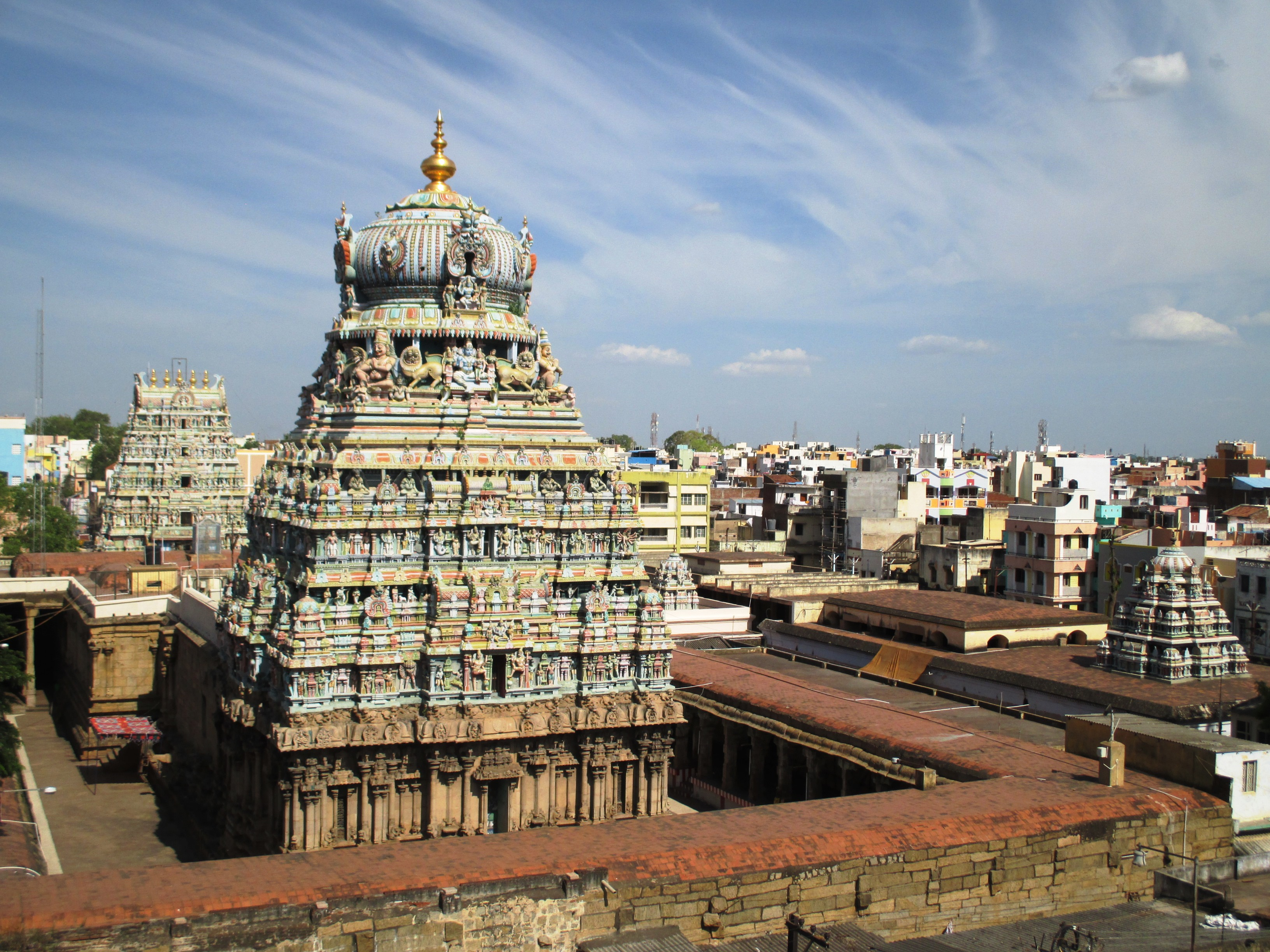
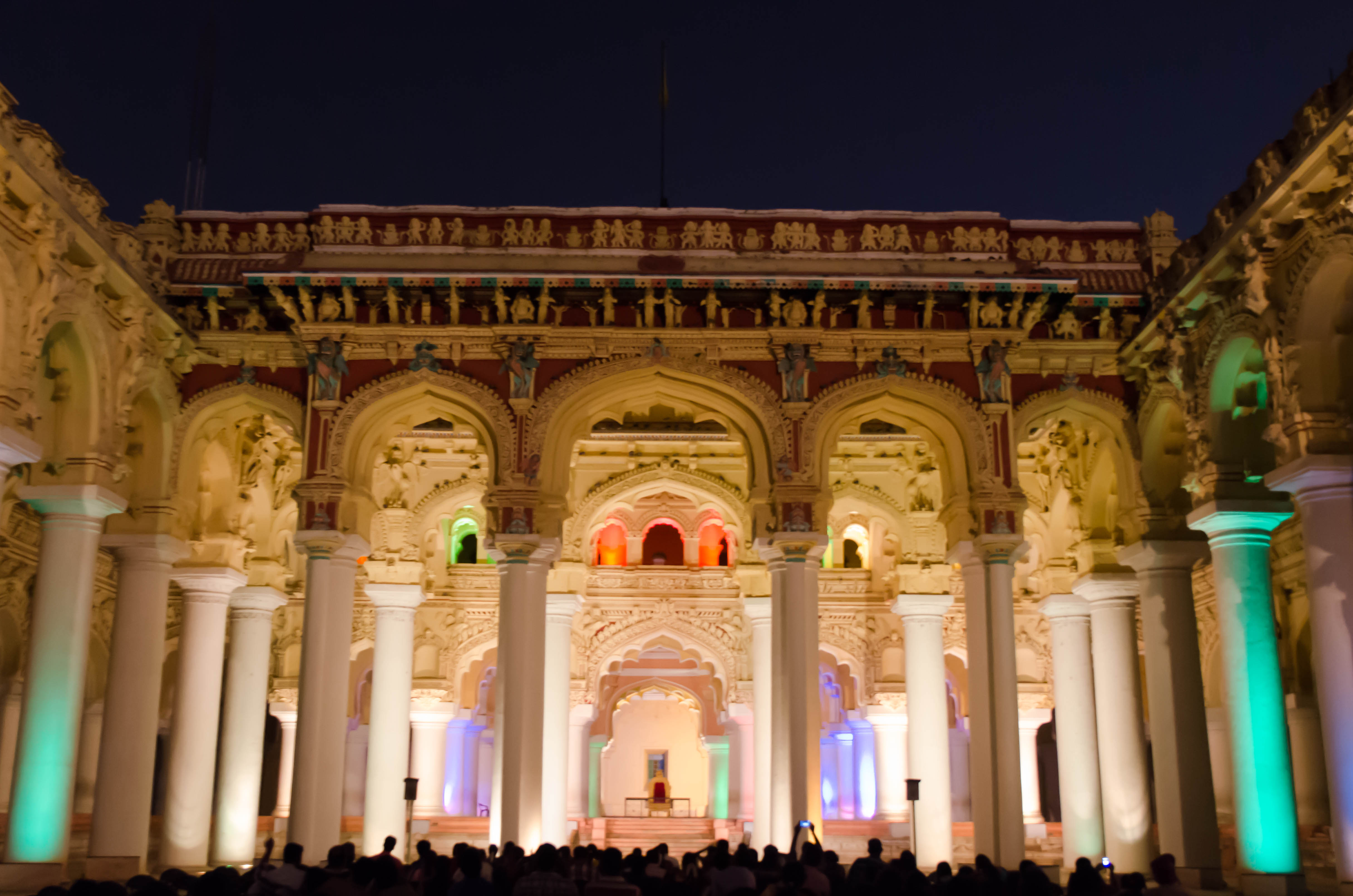
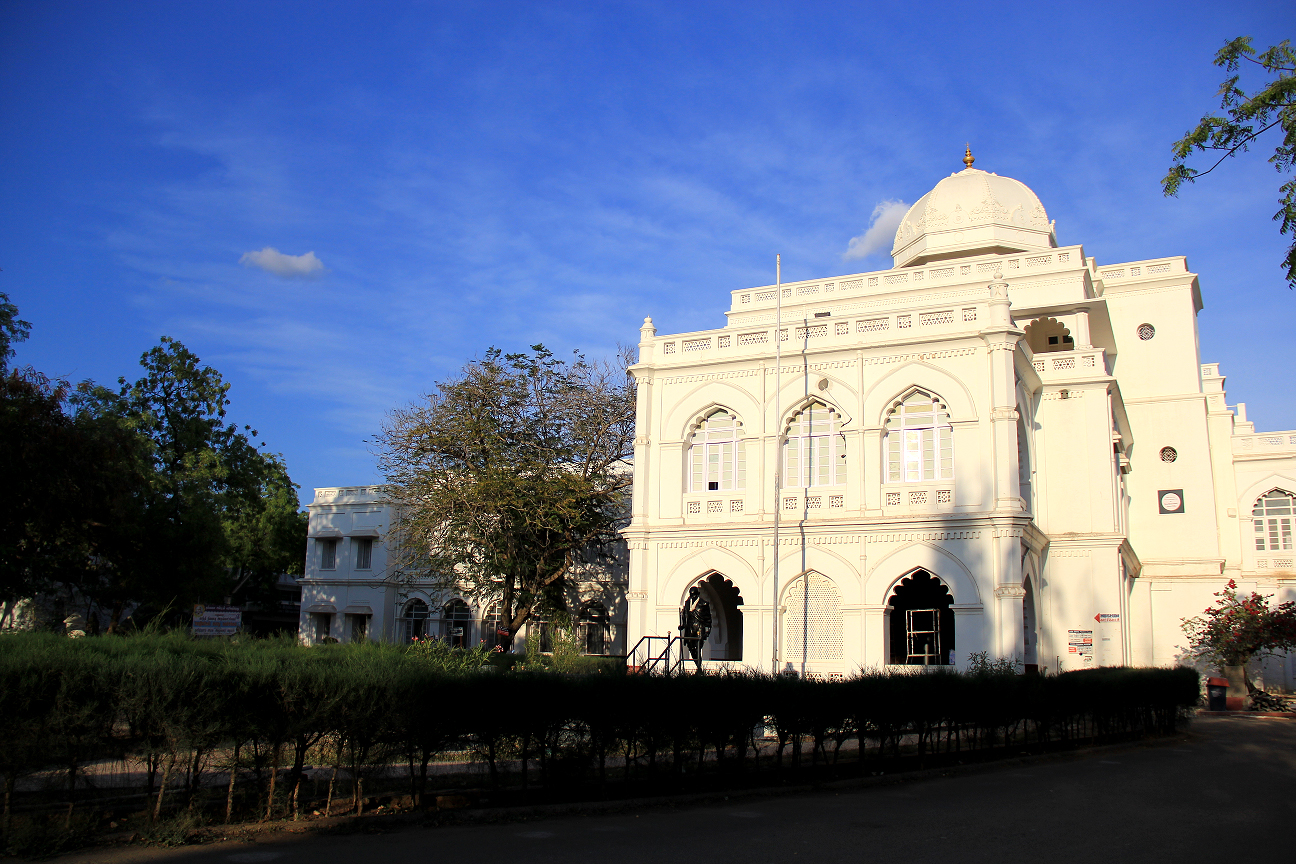
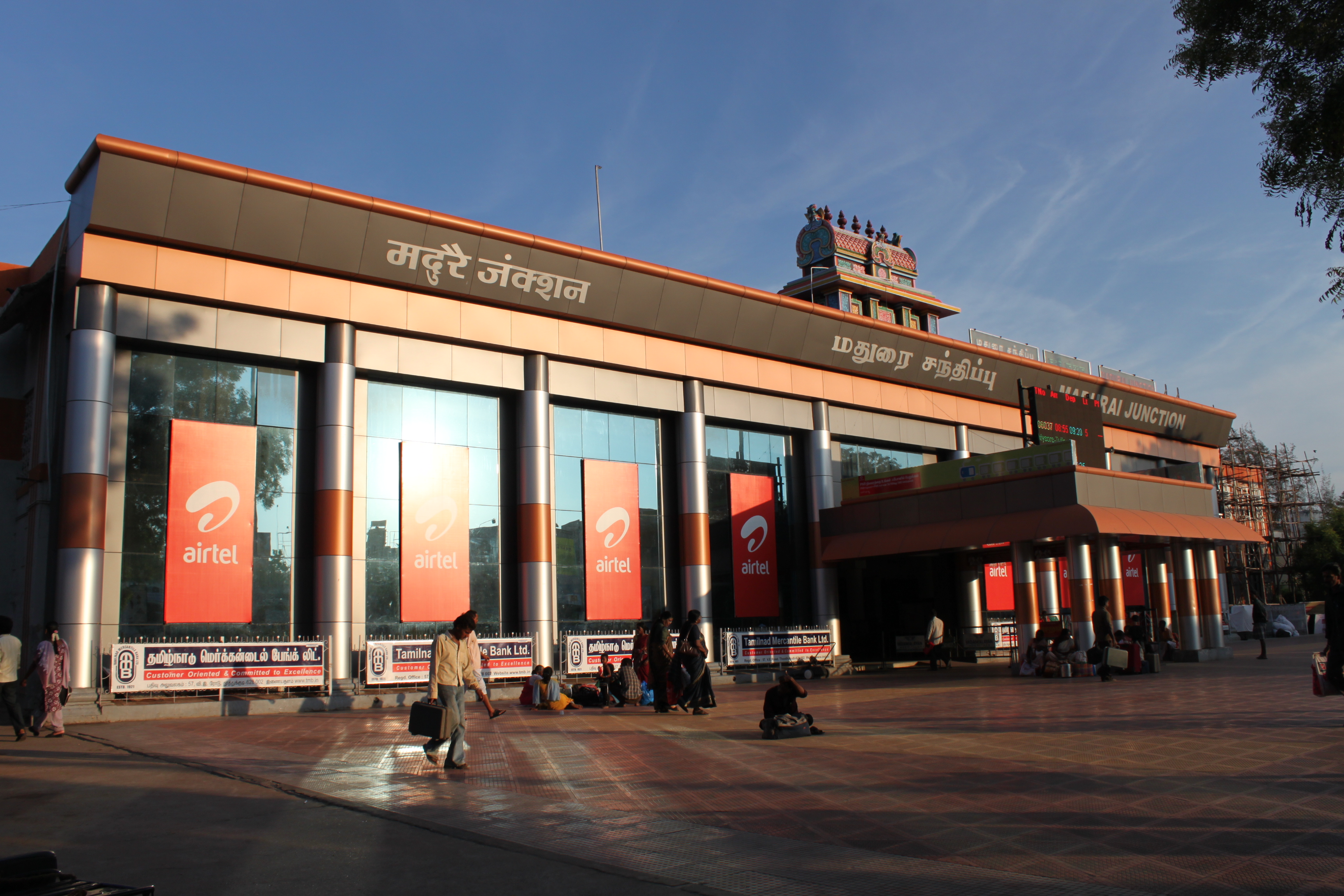
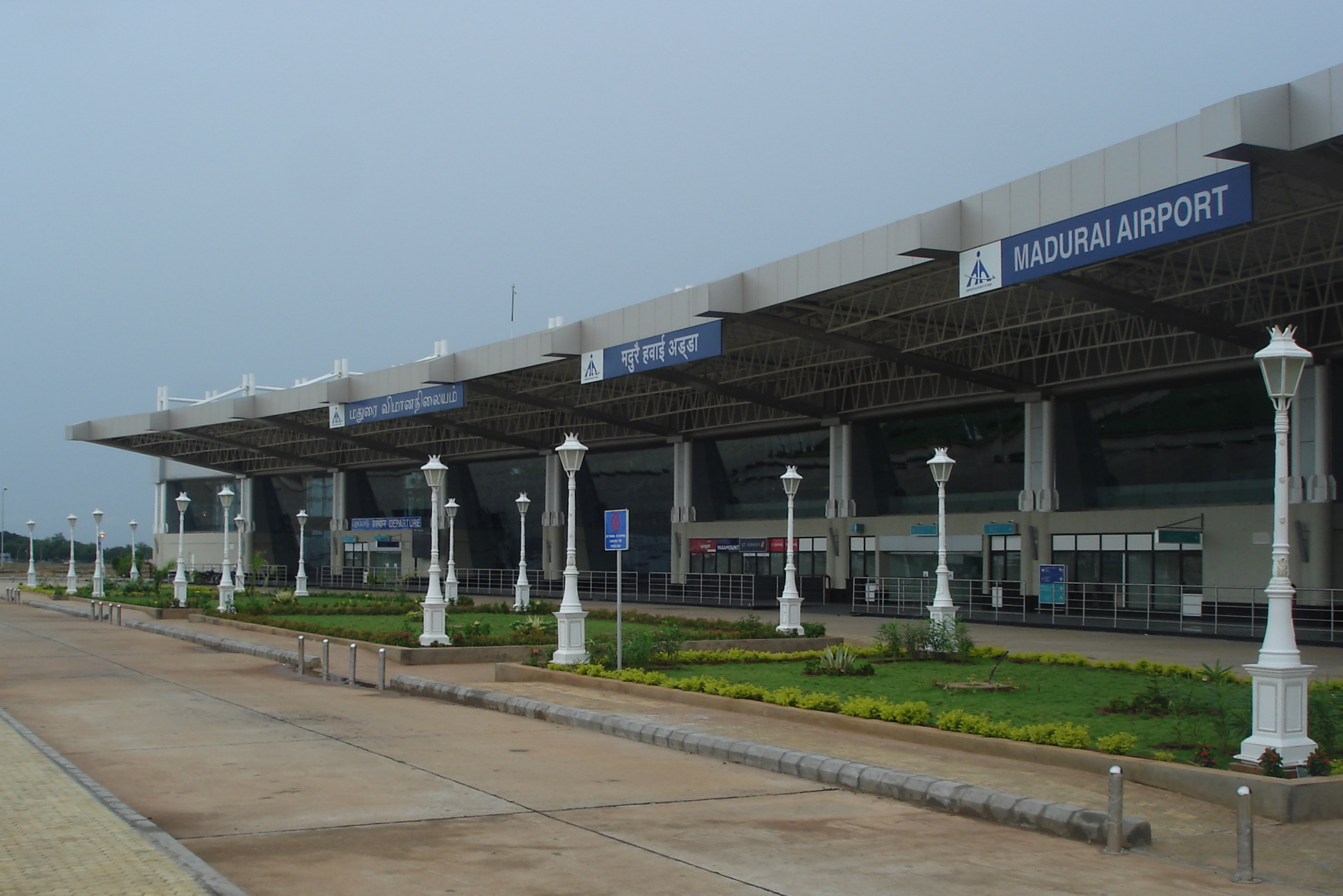
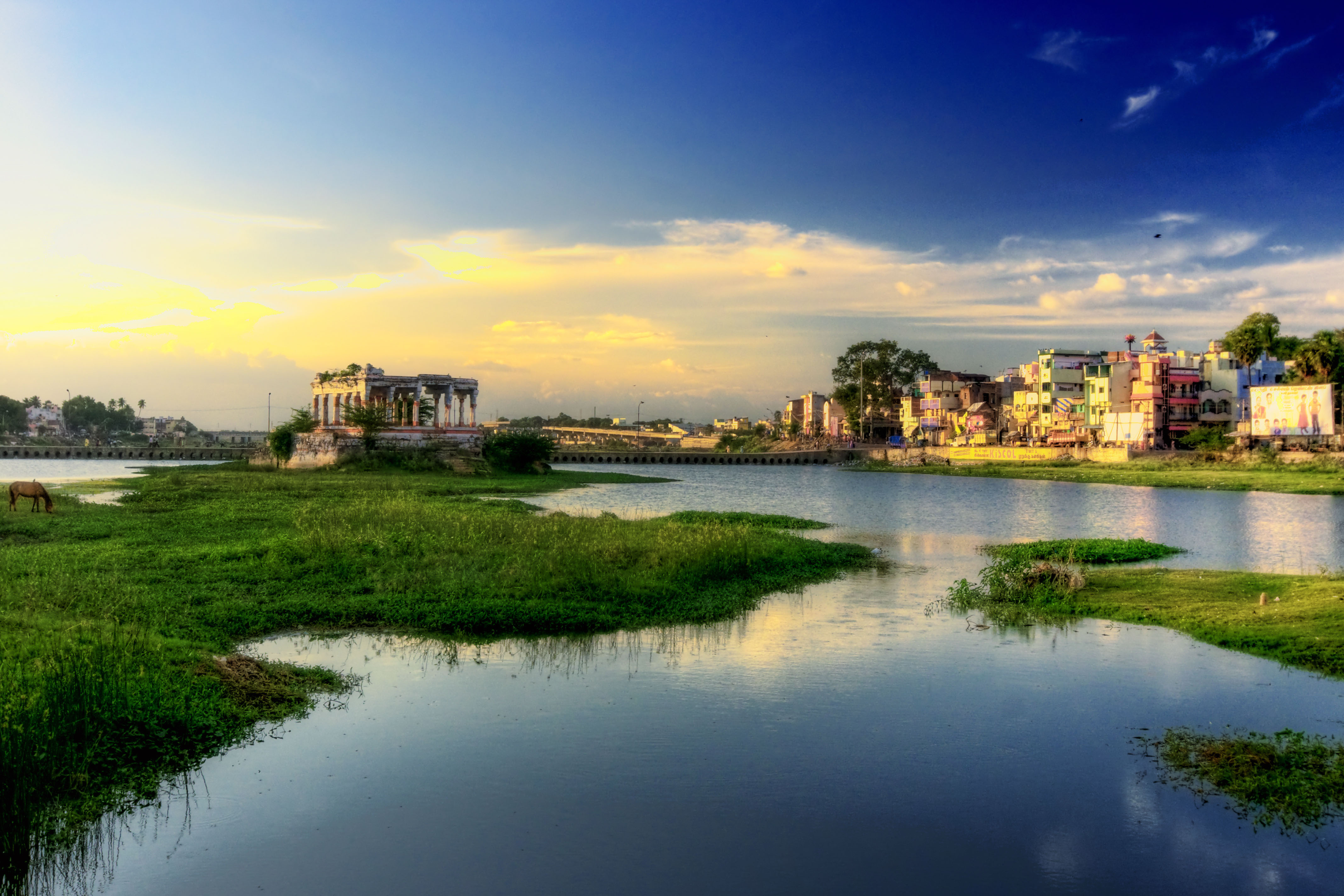
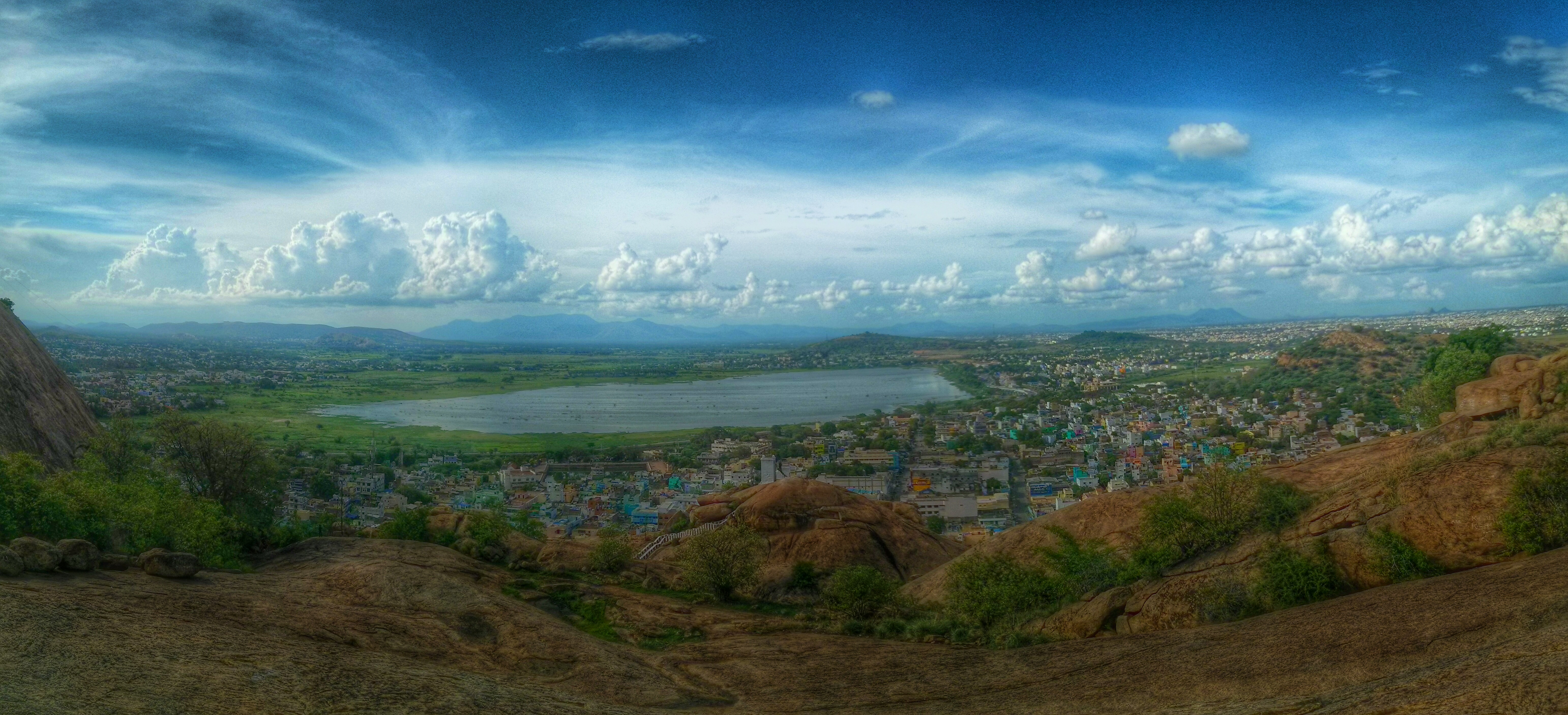
- Meenakshi Sundareswarar Temple Koodal Azhagar Temple Thirumalai Nayakkar Mahal Gandhi Museum Madurai Junction Madurai International Airport Vaigai River Thiruparankundram Aerial view

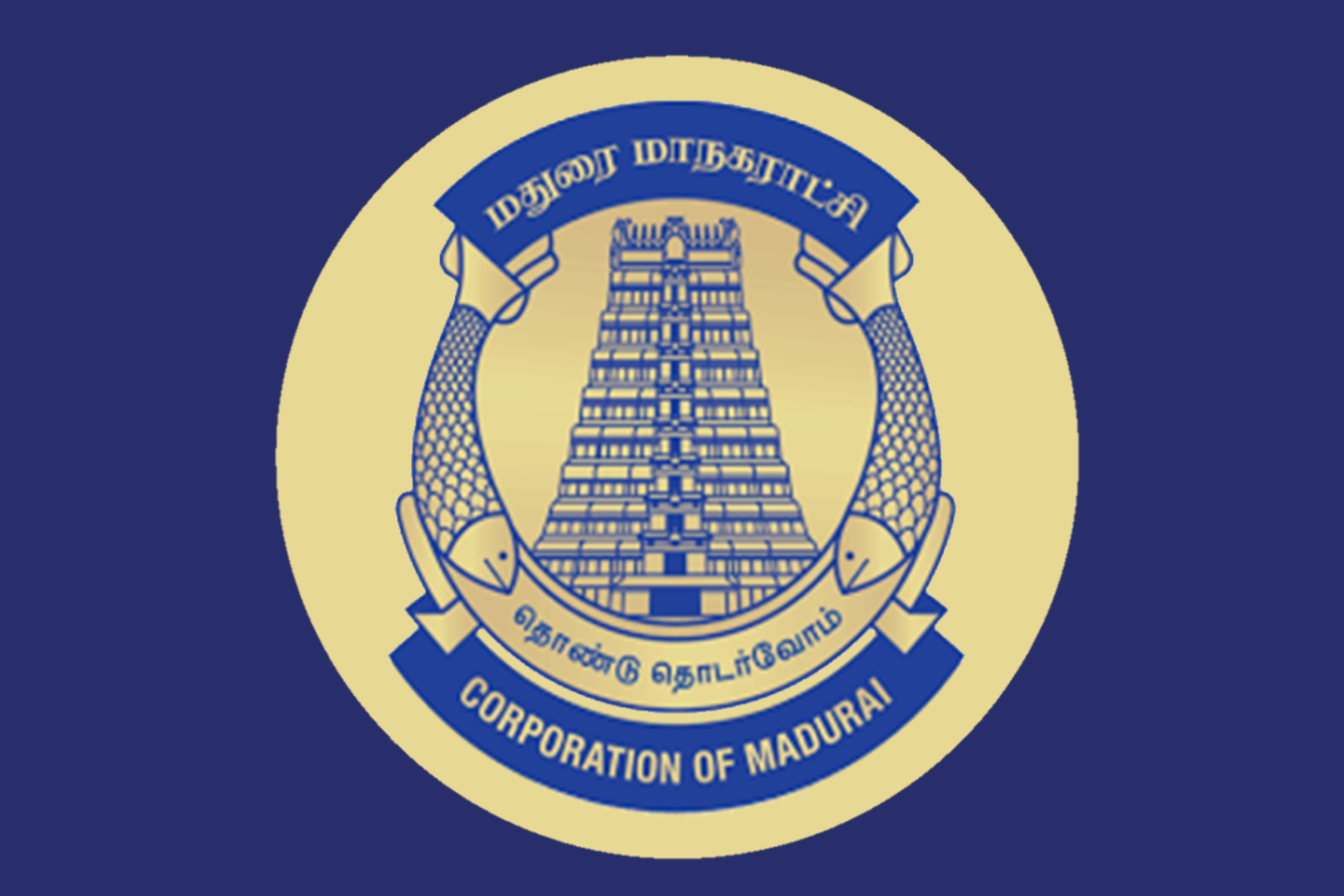
- Flag
- Nicknames: Thoongaa Nagaram (The City That Never Sleeps), Athens of the East, City of Jasmine, City of Festivals, Temple City, Cultural Capital of Tamil Nadu
- Motto(s): Toṇṭu toṭarvōm, "We shall continue our public service"
- Interactive map of Madurai
- Coordinates: 9.925200°N 78.119800°E
- Country: India
- State: Tamil Nadu
- District: Madurai
- Established: 3rd Century BCE
- Named for: Tamil: Matiray ("Walled city")

Government
  - Body: Madurai Municipal Corporation
  - Mayor: V. Indirani Ponvasanth, DMK

Area
  - Metropolis: 147.97 km^{2} (57.13 sq mi)
  - Rank: 3
- Elevation: 134 m (440 ft)

Population (2011)
  - Metropolis: 1,017,865 (Note: The figure corresponds to the expanded city limits. According to the 2011 census, the total city covering an area of 51.82 square kilometres (20.01 mi^{2}) had a population of 1,017,865.)
  - Rank: 44th
  - Density: 6,878.9/km^{2} (17,816/sq mi)
  - Metro: 1,470,755
  - Metro rank: 31st
- Demonym: Maduraivāsi
- Time zone: UTC+5:30 (IST)
- PIN: 625 xxx
- Telephone code: 0452
- Vehicle registration: TN-58,TN-59,TN-64
- Official language: Tamil, English
- Climate: BSh
- GDP (2020): US$13.026 (equivalent to $16.21 in 2025) billion
- Website: maduraicorporation.co.in

Madurai (Note: Tamil: Maturai (see ISO 15919), pronounced [mɐd̪ʊɾɐɪ̯]) is a major city in the Indian state of Tamil Nadu. It is the cultural capital of Tamil Nadu and the administrative headquarters of Madurai district, which is governed by the Madurai Municipal Corporation established on 1 November 1866. As of the 2011 census, it is the third largest metropolis in Tamil Nadu after Chennai and Coimbatore in terms of population and 27th largest urban agglomeration in India. Located on the banks of Vaigai River, Madurai has been a major settlement for two millennia and has a documented history of more than 2500 years. It is often referred to as "Thoongaa Nagaram", meaning "the city that never sleeps".

Madurai is one of the oldest cities in India and South Asia. The third Tamil Sangam, a major congregation of Tamil scholars under the Pandyan dynasty, is said to have been held in the city. The recorded history of the city goes back to the 3rd century BCE, being mentioned by Megasthenes, the Greek ambassador to the Mauryan Empire, and Kautilya, a minister of the Mauryan emperor Chandragupta Maurya. Signs of human settlements and Roman trade links dating back to 300 BCE are evident from excavations by the Archeological Survey of India in Keezhadi, Manalur. The city is believed to be of significant antiquity and has been ruled, at different times, by the Pandyan Kingdom, the Chola Empire, the Madurai Sultanate, the Vijayanagar Empire, the Madurai Nayaks, the Carnatic kingdom, and the British East India Company's British Raj. The city has a number of historical monuments, with the Koodal Azhagar temple, the Meenakshi Temple and the Thirumalai Nayakkar Mahal being the most prominent.

Madurai is an important industrial and educational hub in Tamil Nadu. The city is home to various automobile, rubber, chemical and granite manufacturing industries. Madurai has important government educational institutes such as the Madurai Medical College, the Homeopathic Medical College, the Madurai Law College, the Tamil Nadu Agricultural University (Madurai Campus), the Kamaraj University, and the All India Institute of Medical Sciences, Madurai. The city covers an area of 147.97 km^{2} (57.13 sq mi) and had a population of 1,470,755 in 2011. The second bench of the Madras High Court is situated in Madurai. (Note: The Madurai Bench has been functioning since 2004.)

It is one amongst the towns and cities selected for the AMRUT mission, undertaken by the Government of India. The Government of Tamil Nadu contributes to the infrastructure development in the city.

== Toponymy ==
According to Iravatham Mahadevan, a 2nd-century BCE Tamil-Brahmi inscription refers to the city as matiray, an Old Tamil word meaning a "walled city".

Madurai, as Kadambavanam, is one of the many historic temple towns of India which are named after the specific variety of groves or forests that shelter the presiding deity. Madurai is believed to have been originally a forest of Kadamba trees, hence its name. The city is referred to by various other names, including "Koodal" (Note: lit., assembly [Tamil]), "Malligai Maanagar" (Note: lit., the great town of jasmine flowers [Tamil]; a reference to the local characteristic Madurai Malli type of jasmine flowers.), "Naanmadakoodal" (Note: lit., assembly (koodal) of four (naan-) halls (maada-) [Tamil]) and "Thirualavai" (Note: lit., "the city encircled by a coiled serpent" or "the city surrounded by moats filled with water" [Tamil]). It is believed that Madurai is the derivative of the word Marutham, which refers to the type of landscape of the Sangam age. A town in the neighbouring Dindigul district is called Vada Madurai (North Madurai) and another in Sivaganga district is called Manamadurai. The different names by which the city has been referred to historically are listed in the 7th-century poem Thiruvilayaadal Puraanam written by Paranjothi Munivar. Vaishnava texts refer to Madurai as the "southern Mathura", probably similar to Tenkasi (southern Kashi).

Koodal means an assembly or congregation of scholarly people, referring to the three Tamil Sangams held at Madurai. Naanmadakoodal, meaning the junction of four towers, refers to the four major temples for which Madurai was known for. The Sangam literature mentions the Koodal Azhagar Temple at the centre of the city. Historians are of the opinion that Koodal Azhagar Temple finds mention in Sangam literature (3rd century BCE–3rd century CE) in works like Madurai Kanchi by Mangudi Marudan, Paripāṭal, Kaliththokai and Silappatikaram. Madurai Kanchi details the Thiruvonam festival celebrated in the temple. Koodal Azhagar Temple is revered in Nalayira Divya Prabhandam, the 5th–9th century Vaishnava canon, by Periyalvar, Thirumalisai Alvar and Thirumangai Alvar. The temple is classified as a Divya Desams, one of the 108 Vishnu temples that are mentioned in the book. During the 18th and 19th centuries, the temple finds mention in several works like 108 Tirupathi Anthathi by Divya Kavi Pillai Perumal Aiyangar and Koodal Sthala Purana. Tevaram, the 7th- or 8th-century Tamil compositions on Shiva by the three prominent Nayanars (Saivites), namely Appar, Sundarar and Thirugnanasambandar, address the city as Thirualavai.

== History ==
=== Early and medieval history ===
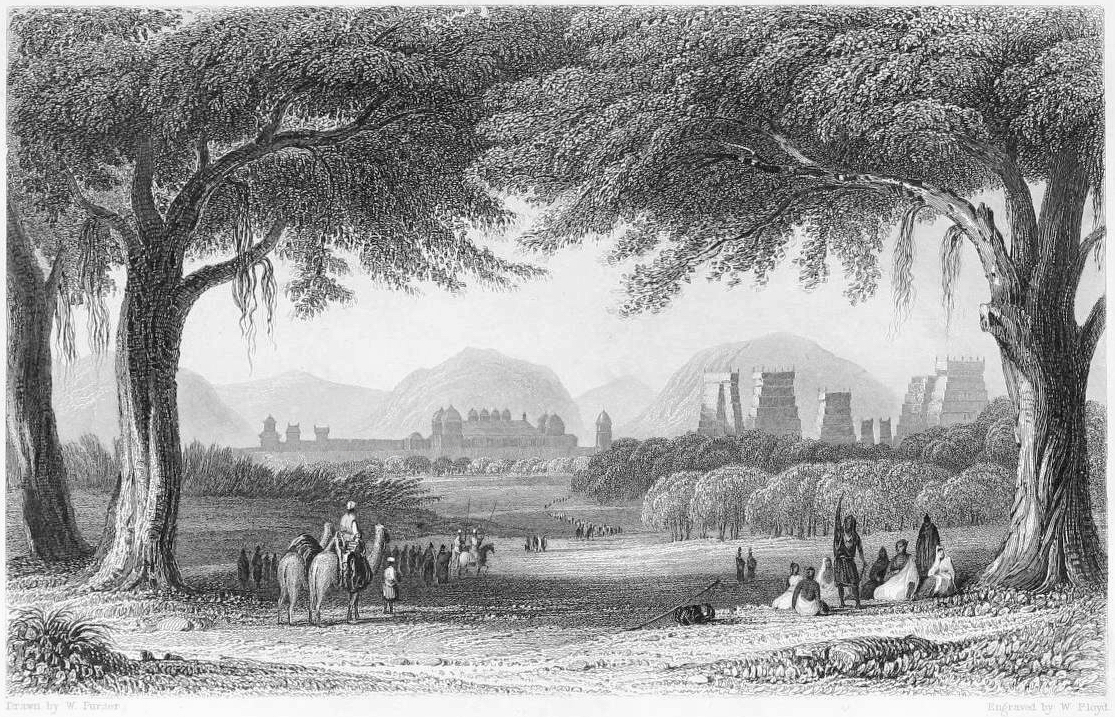
Hand coloured antique wood engraving drawn by W. Purser (1858) shows Madurai city and Meenakshi Temple as seen from the north bank of the Vaigai River

Madurai is one of the oldest continuously inhabited cities of Tamil Nadu, dating back to the 3rd century BCE. The Sangam period settlement site of Keeladi, dating back to the 6th century BCE, is located about 12 kilometres southeast of Madurai. Inscriptions of the Pandya king Netunceliyan I (c. 2nd century BCE) are found in Mangulam, a village located 25 kilometres from Madurai. The second book of the Tamil epic Silappatikaram (c. 5th century CE) is set in Madurai.

Megasthenes may have visited Madurai during the 3rd century BCE, with the city referred as "Methora" in his accounts. The view is contested by some scholars who believe "Methora" refers to the north Indian city of Mathura, as it was a large and established city in the Mauryan Empire. Madurai is also mentioned in Kautilya's (370–283 BCE) Arthashastra. Sangam literature like Maturaikkāñci records the importance of Madurai as a capital city of the Pandyan dynasty. Madurai is mentioned in the works of Roman historians Pliny the Younger (61 – c. 112 CE), Ptolemy (c. 90 – c. CE 168), those of the Greek geographer Strabo (64/63 BCE – c. 24 CE), and also in Periplus of the Erythraean Sea.

The Buddhist text Mahavamsa mentions Madurai in the context of Prince Vijaya's (543–505 BCE) arrival in Sri Lanka with his 700 followers. According to the Mahavamsa, emissaries laden with precious gifts, jewels and pearls, were sent from Sri Lanka to Madurai of ancient Tamilakam. Their mission was to secure a bride for Prince Vijaya. The Pandyan King of Madurai agreed to the proposal. He not only sent his own daughter to marry Prince Vijaya but also requested other families to offer their daughters to marry the prince's ministers and retainers. So, along with the Princess and hundreds of maidens, craftsmen and a thousand families from the eighteen guilds were also sent to Sri Lanka.

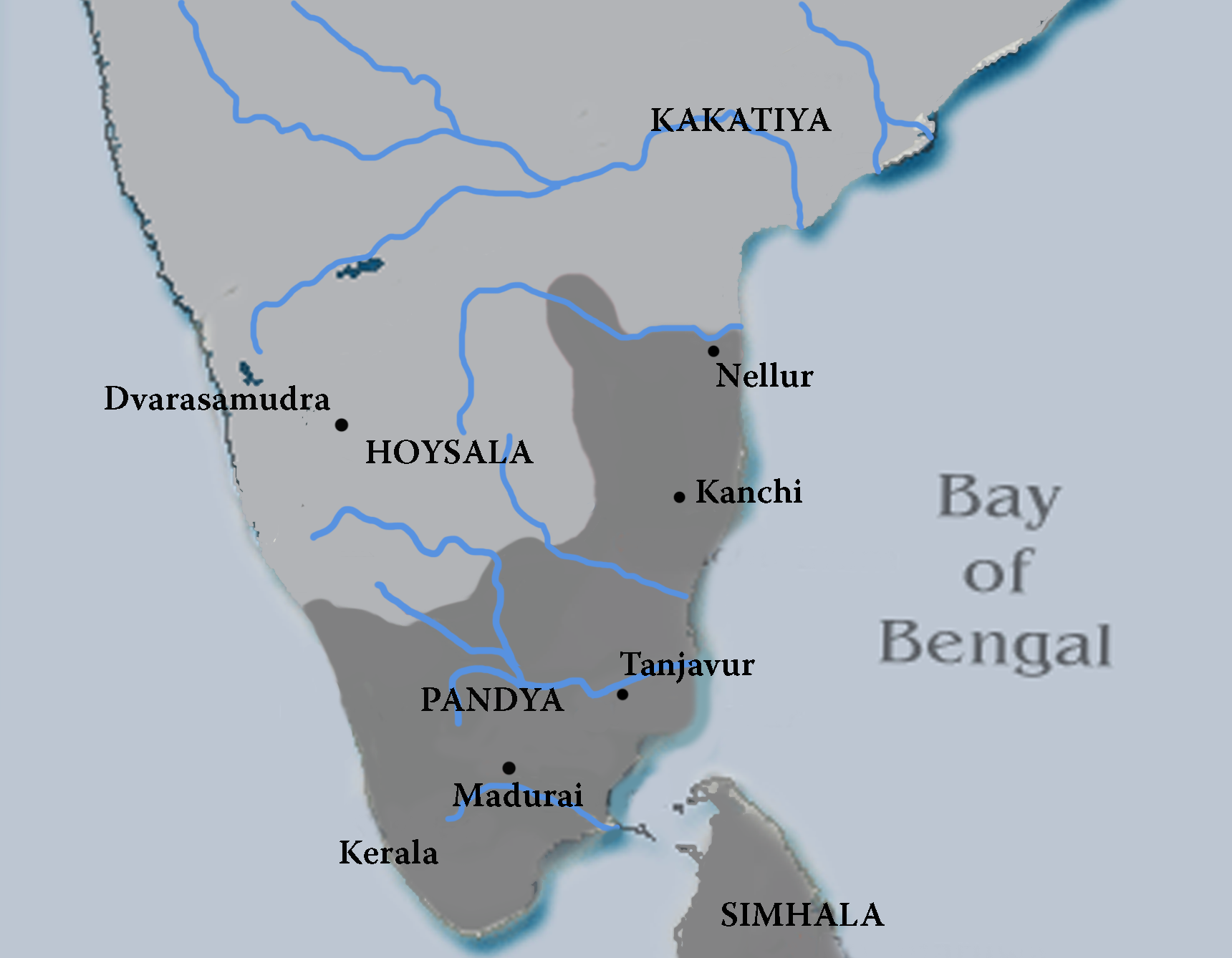
Pandyan dynasty at its greatest extent

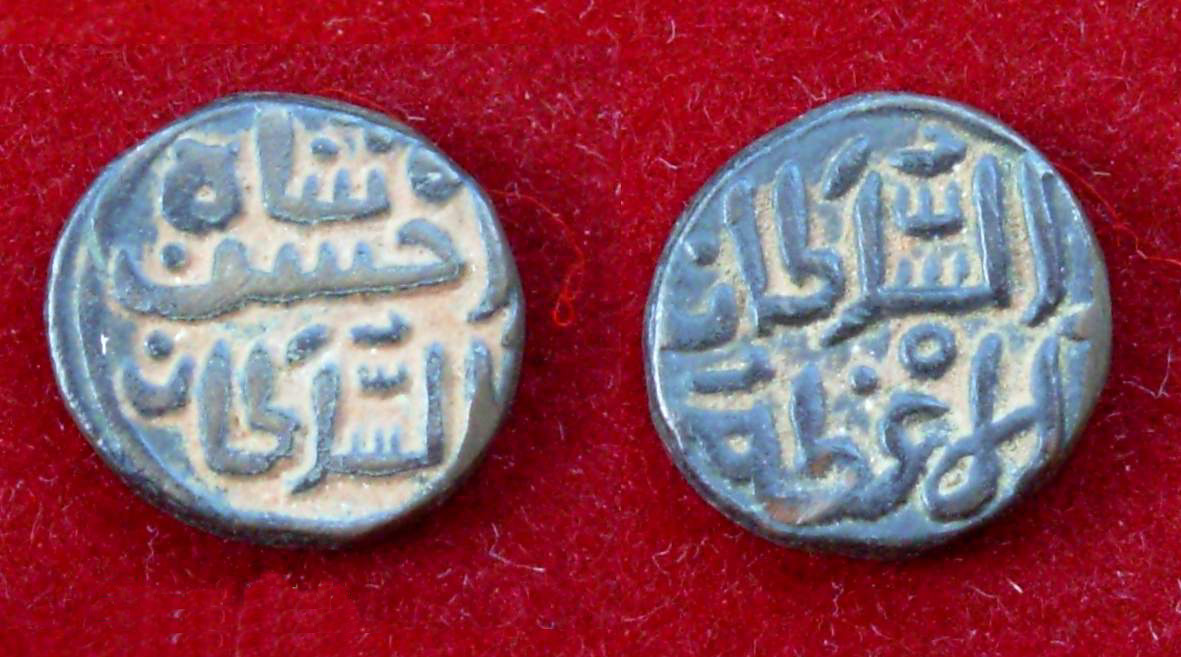
Coin of Jalaluddin Ahsan Khan, first ruler of the Sultanate of Madurai, 1335–1339 CE

After the Sangam age, most of present-day Tamil Nadu, including Madurai, came under the rule of the Kalabhra dynasty, which was ousted by the Pandyas under Kadunkon, around 590 CE. By the 7th century CE, Madurai had become the primary capital of the Pandyas, as evidenced from the works of the Bhakti period saints like Appar and Sambandar. The Pandyas were ousted from Madurai by the Chola dynasty during the early 9th century. The city was fought over between the Cholas and the Pandyas during the 12th century, changing hands several times, until the early 13th century, when the second Pandyan empire was established with Madurai as its capital. After the death of Kulasekara Pandian (1268–1308 CE), Madurai came under the rule of the Delhi Sultanate. The Madurai Sultanate then seceded from Delhi and functioned as an independent kingdom until its gradual annexation by the Vijayanagara Empire in 1378 CE. Madurai became independent from Vijayanagar in 1559 CE under the Nayaks. Nayak rule ended in 1736 CE and Madurai was repeatedly captured several times by Chanda Sahib (1740 – 1754 CE), Arcot Nawab and Muhammed Yusuf Khan (1725 – 1764 CE) in the middle of the 18th century.

=== British rule ===
In 1801, Madurai came under the direct control of the British East India Company and was annexed to the Madras Presidency. The British government made donations to the Meenakshi Temple and participated in the Hindu festivals during the early part of their rule. The city evolved as a political and industrial complex through the 19th and 20th centuries to become a district headquarters of a larger Madurai district. In 1837, the fortifications around the temple were demolished by the British. The moat was drained and the debris was used to construct new streets – Veli, Marret and Perumal Maistry streets. The city was constituted as a municipality in 1866 under the Town Improvement Act of 1865. The British government faced initial hiccups during the earlier period of the establishment of municipality in land ceiling and tax collection in Madurai and Dindigul districts under the direct administration of the officers of the government. The city, along with the district, was resurveyed between 1880 and 1885 CE and subsequently, five municipalities were constituted in the two districts and six taluk boards were set up for local administration. Police stations were established in Madurai city, housing the headquarters of the District Superintendent.

=== Contemporary and modern history ===
It was in Madurai, in 1921, that Mahatma Gandhi, pre-eminent leader of Indian nationalism in British-ruled India, first adopted the loin cloth as his mode of dress after seeing agricultural labourers wearing it. Leaders of the independence movement in Madurai included N. M. R. Subbaraman, Karumuttu Thiagarajan Chettiar and Mohammad Ismail Sahib. The Temple Entry Authorization and Indemnity Act passed by the government of Madras Presidency under C. Rajagopalachari in 1939 removed restrictions prohibiting Shanars and Dalits from entering Hindu temples. The temple entry movement was first led in Madurai Meenakshi temple by independence activist A. Vaidyanatha Iyer in 1939.

In 1971, the municipality of Madurai was upgraded to a Municipal Corporation. In 2011 the Corporation of Madurai expanded the area of its jurisdiction from seventy-two wards to one hundred wards, an increase in area from 51.82 square kilometres (12,810 acres) to 147.997 square kilometres (36,571 acres).

== Architecture ==
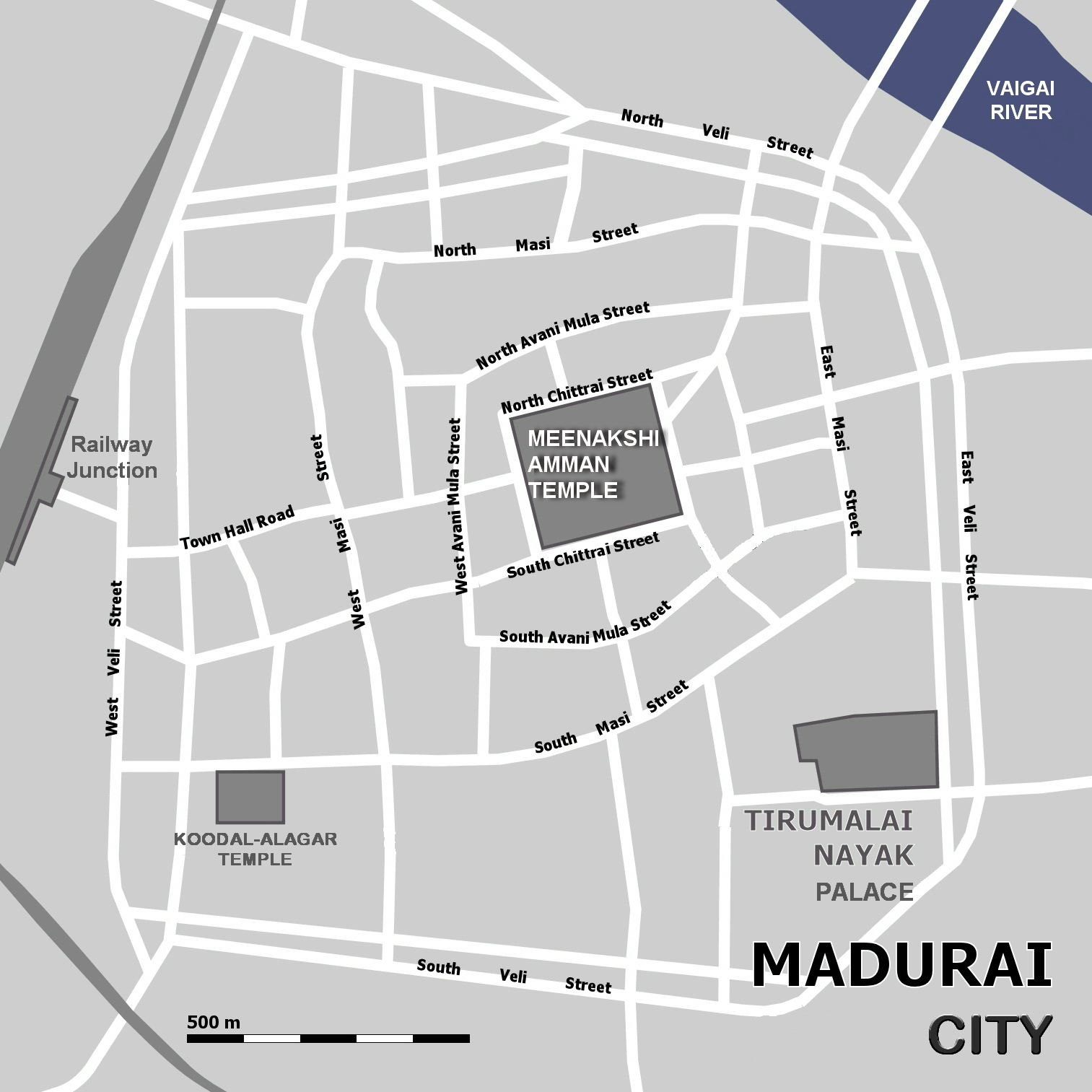
Map of Madurai showing core centre of the city and some important landmarks

Madurai is built around the Koodal Azhagar Temple and the Meenakshi Temple, which acted as the geographic and ritual centre of the ancient city of Madurai. The city is divided into a number of concentric quadrangular streets around the temple. Viswanatha Nayak (1529–64 CE), the first Madurai Nayak king, redesigned the city in accordance with the principles laid out by Shilpa Shastras (Sanskrit: śilpa śāstra, also anglicised as silpa sastra meaning rules of architecture), which related to urban planning. These squares retain their traditional names of Aadi, Chittirai, Avani-moola and Masi streets, corresponding to the Tamil month names and also to the festivals associated.

The temple prakarams (outer precincts of a temple) and streets accommodate an elaborate festival calendar in which dramatic processions circumambulate the shrines at varying distances from the centre. The temple chariots used in processions are progressively larger in size based on the size of the concentric streets. Ancient Tamil classics record the temple as the centre of the city and the surrounding streets appearing liken a lotus and its petals. The city's axes were aligned with the four-quarters of the compass, and the four gateways of the temple provided access to it. The wealthy and higher echelons of the society were placed in streets close to the temple, while the poorest were placed in the fringe streets. With the advent of British rule during the 19th century, Madurai became the headquarters of a large colonial political complex and an industrial town; with urbanisation, the social hierarchical classes became unified.

== Geography and climate ==
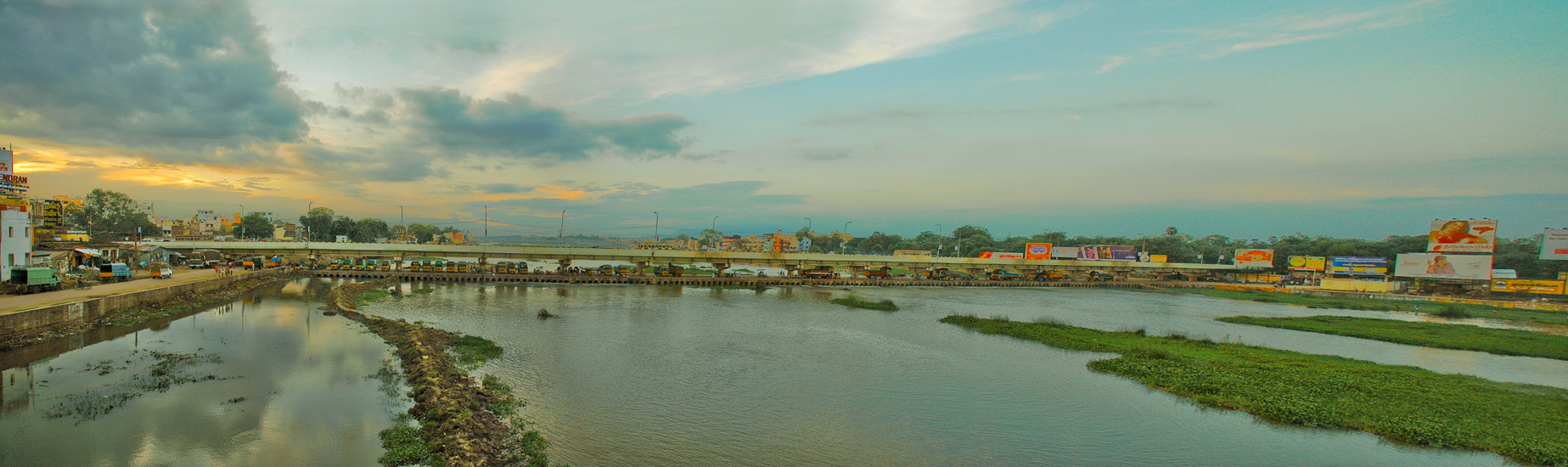
Vaigai River in Madurai

The Corporation of Madurai has an area of 147.97 square kilometres or 57.13 square miles.

Madurai is located at 9.93°N 78.12°E. It has an average elevation of 134 metres. The city of Madurai lies on the flat and fertile plain of the river Vaigai, which runs in the northwest–southeast direction through the city, dividing it into two almost equal halves. The Sirumalai and Nagamalai hills lie to the north and west of Madurai. The land in and around Madurai is utilised largely for agricultural activity, which is fostered by the Periyar Dam. Madurai lies southeast of the Western Ghats, and the surrounding region occupies the plains of South India and contains several mountain spurs. The soil type in central Madurai is predominantly clay loam, while red loam and black cotton types are widely prevalent in the outer fringes of the city. Paddy is the major crop, followed by pulses, millet, oil seed, cotton and sugarcane.

As is typical for Tamil Nadu, Madurai has a hot semi-arid climate (BSh), although it borders closely upon a tropical savanna climate (Köppen Aw/As).

Madurai is hot and dry for eight months of the year. Cold winds are experienced during February and March as in the neighbouring Dindigul. The hottest months are from March to July. The city experiences a moderate climate from August to October, tempered by heavy rain and thundershowers, and a slightly cooler climate from November to February. Fog and dew are rare, occurring only during the winter season. Being equidistant from mountains and the sea, it experiences similar monsoon pattern with the Northeast monsoon and the Southwest monsoon, with the former providing more rain during October to December. The average annual rainfall for the Madurai district is about 85.76 cm.

Temperatures during summer generally reach a maximum of 42 °C or 107.6 °F and a minimum of 26.3 °C or 79.3 °F, although temperatures up to 43 °C or 109.4 °F are not uncommon. Winter temperatures range between 29.6 °C or 85.3 °F and 18 °C or 64.4 °F. A study based on the data available with the Indian Meteorological Department on Madurai over a period of 62 years indicate rising trend in atmospheric temperature over Madurai city, attributed to urbanisation, growth of vehicles and industrial activity. The maximum temperature of 42 °C or 107.6 °F for the decade of 2001 to 2010 was recorded in 2004 and in 2010. The average annual temperature ranges from 25 to 35 °C.

Climate data for Madurai (1991-2020)
Month	Jan	Feb	Mar	Apr	May	Jun	Jul	Aug	Sep	Oct	Nov	Dec	Year
Record high °C (°F)	39.1 (102.4)	38.5 (101.3)	41.7 (107.1)	42.1 (107.8)	44.5 (112.1)	42.2 (108.0)	40.6 (105.1)	41.7 (107.1)	40.8 (105.4)	40.0 (104.0)	38.0 (100.4)	37.0 (98.6)	44.5 (112.1)
Mean daily maximum °C (°F)	31.1 (88.0)	33.2 (91.8)	35.8 (96.4)	36.7 (98.1)	37.5 (99.5)	36.1 (97.0)	36.2 (97.2)	36.3 (97.3)	35.2 (95.4)	33.0 (91.4)	31.5 (88.7)	30.8 (87.4)	34.5 (94.1)
Mean daily minimum °C (°F)	21.2 (70.2)	22.2 (72.0)	23.4 (74.1)	24.6 (76.3)	25.6 (78.1)	25.2 (77.4)	24.9 (76.8)	24.9 (76.8)	24.5 (76.1)	23.6 (74.5)	22.9 (73.2)	21.5 (70.7)	23.7 (74.7)
Record low °C (°F)	15.6 (60.1)	14.5 (58.1)	16.9 (62.4)	19.4 (66.9)	17.8 (64.0)	17.8 (64.0)	19.4 (66.9)	20.5 (68.9)	18.5 (65.3)	18.9 (66.0)	17.2 (63.0)	16.7 (62.1)	14.5 (58.1)
Average rainfall mm (inches)	4.3 (0.17)	4.3 (0.17)	12.4 (0.49)	47.4 (1.87)	58.1 (2.29)	39.1 (1.54)	38.0 (1.50)	55.1 (2.17)	85.7 (3.37)	142.7 (5.62)	135.8 (5.35)	49.3 (1.94)	672.2 (26.46)
Average rainy days	0.5	0.3	0.5	2.3	3.1	2.6	2.1	3.5	4.7	7.4	6.2	3.5	36.6
Average relative humidity (%)	77	77	76	72	70	68	70	71	71	76	78	78	74
Average ultraviolet index	7	7	8	8	8	8	8	8	7	7	6	6	7
Source 1: Indian Meteorological Department Mean (humidity 1981-2010)
Source 2: Weather Atlas

Climate data for Madurai International Airport (1991-2020)
Month	Jan	Feb	Mar	Apr	May	Jun	Jul	Aug	Sep	Oct	Nov	Dec	Year
Record high °C (°F)	35.0 (95.0)	38.7 (101.7)	41.0 (105.8)	42.3 (108.1)	43.4 (110.1)	42.8 (109.0)	42.0 (107.6)	40.6 (105.1)	41.8 (107.2)	39.6 (103.3)	36.8 (98.2)	34.8 (94.6)	43.4 (110.1)
Mean daily maximum °C (°F)	31.2 (88.2)	33.5 (92.3)	36.3 (97.3)	37.5 (99.5)	38.0 (100.4)	37.6 (99.7)	37.2 (99.0)	36.6 (97.9)	35.7 (96.3)	33.6 (92.5)	31.0 (87.8)	30.3 (86.5)	34.9 (94.8)
Mean daily minimum °C (°F)	20.9 (69.6)	21.8 (71.2)	23.6 (74.5)	25.7 (78.3)	26.3 (79.3)	26.3 (79.3)	26.1 (79.0)	25.5 (77.9)	24.8 (76.6)	24.0 (75.2)	23.0 (73.4)	21.7 (71.1)	24.1 (75.4)
Record low °C (°F)	15.0 (59.0)	14.6 (58.3)	16.8 (62.2)	20.0 (68.0)	20.7 (69.3)	21.2 (70.2)	20.1 (68.2)	19.5 (67.1)	19.8 (67.6)	19.4 (66.9)	16.9 (62.4)	15.5 (59.9)	14.6 (58.3)
Average rainfall mm (inches)	9.8 (0.39)	4.4 (0.17)	15.0 (0.59)	66.9 (2.63)	80.7 (3.18)	40.7 (1.60)	46.1 (1.81)	92.9 (3.66)	107.0 (4.21)	181.1 (7.13)	146.3 (5.76)	52.4 (2.06)	843.3 (33.20)
Average rainy days	0.8	0.8	0.9	3.4	4.1	2.4	2.7	4.9	6.3	9.4	7.4	3.5	46.6
Average relative humidity (%)	76	74	69	68	63	59	58	62	66	75	80	77	69
Source: Indian Meteorological Department Mean

Madurai has been ranked 42nd best “National Clean Air City” (under Category 1 >10L Population cities) in India.

== Demographics ==
Historical population
Year	Pop.	±% p.a.
1837	35,400	—
1854	43,000	+1.15%
1862	50,000	+1.90%
1871	51,987	+0.43%
1881	73,807	+3.57%
1891	87,428	+1.71%
1901	105,984	+1.94%
1911	134,130	+2.38%
1921	138,894	+0.35%
1931	182,018	+2.74%
1941	239,144	+2.77%
1951	361,781	+4.23%
1961	458,981	+2.41%
1971	633,989	+3.28%
1981	820,891	+2.62%
1991	940,989	+1.37%
2001	928,869	−0.13%
2011	1,017,865	+0.92%
Source: *: 1837 - 1854: 1862: 1871 - 1891: 1891 - 1901: 1911 - 1941: 1951 – 1981: 1991: 2001: 2011:

Religion in Madurai (2011)
Religion	Percent(%)
Hinduism	85.83%
Islam	8.54%
Christianity	5.18%
Others	0.47%

According to 2011 census based on pre-expansion limits, the area covered under the Corporation of Madurai had a population of 1,017,865 with a sex-ratio of 999 females for every 1,000 males, much above the national average of 929. A total of 100,324 were under the age of six, constituting 51,485 males and 48,839 females. Scheduled Castes and Scheduled Tribes accounted for 6.27% and 0.31% of the population respectively. The average literacy of the city was 81.95%, compared to the national average of 72.99%. The urban agglomeration of Madurai had a population of 1,465,625, and is the third largest in Tamil Nadu and the 31st in India.

According to the religious census of 2011, Madurai had 85.83% Hindus, 8.54% Muslims, 5.18% Christians and 0.47% others. Tamil is the main language, and the standard dialect is the Madurai Tamil dialect, and is spoken by 89.0% of the population. Sourashtra, is the largest minority language which is spoken by 5.4% of the population. Other significant minority languages include Telugu (2.7%) and Urdu (1.5%). Roman Catholics in Madurai are affiliated with the Roman Catholic Diocese of Madurai, while Protestants are affiliated with the Madurai-Ramnad Diocese of the Church of South India.

In 2001, Slum-dwellers comprise 32.6 per cent of the total population, much higher than the national average of 15.05 per cent. The increase in growth rate to 50 per cent from 1971 to 1981 is due to the city's upgrade to a municipal corporation in 1974 and the subsequent inclusion of 13 Panchayats into the corporation limits. The decline in the population growth rate between 1981 and 2001 is due to the bifurcation of Madurai district into two, Madurai and Dindigul in 1984, and the subsequently of part of the city into the Theni district in 1997. The compounded annual growth rate dropped from 4.10 per cent during 1971–81 to 1.27 per cent during 1991–2004.

== Administration and politics ==
Municipal Corporation Officials
Mayor	Mrs.Indirani Ponvasanth
Commissioner	Visagan
Deputy Mayor	seat vacant
Members of Legislative Assembly
Madurai Central	P.T.R. Palanivel Thiagarajan
Madurai East	P.Moorthy
Madurai North	G. Thalapathi
Madurai South	M. Boominathan
Madurai West	Sellur K. Raju
Thiruparankundram	V. V. Rajan Chellappa
Thirumangalam	R.B .Udhayakumar
Members of Parliament
Madurai	S. Venkatesan
Virudhunagar	Manicka Tagore

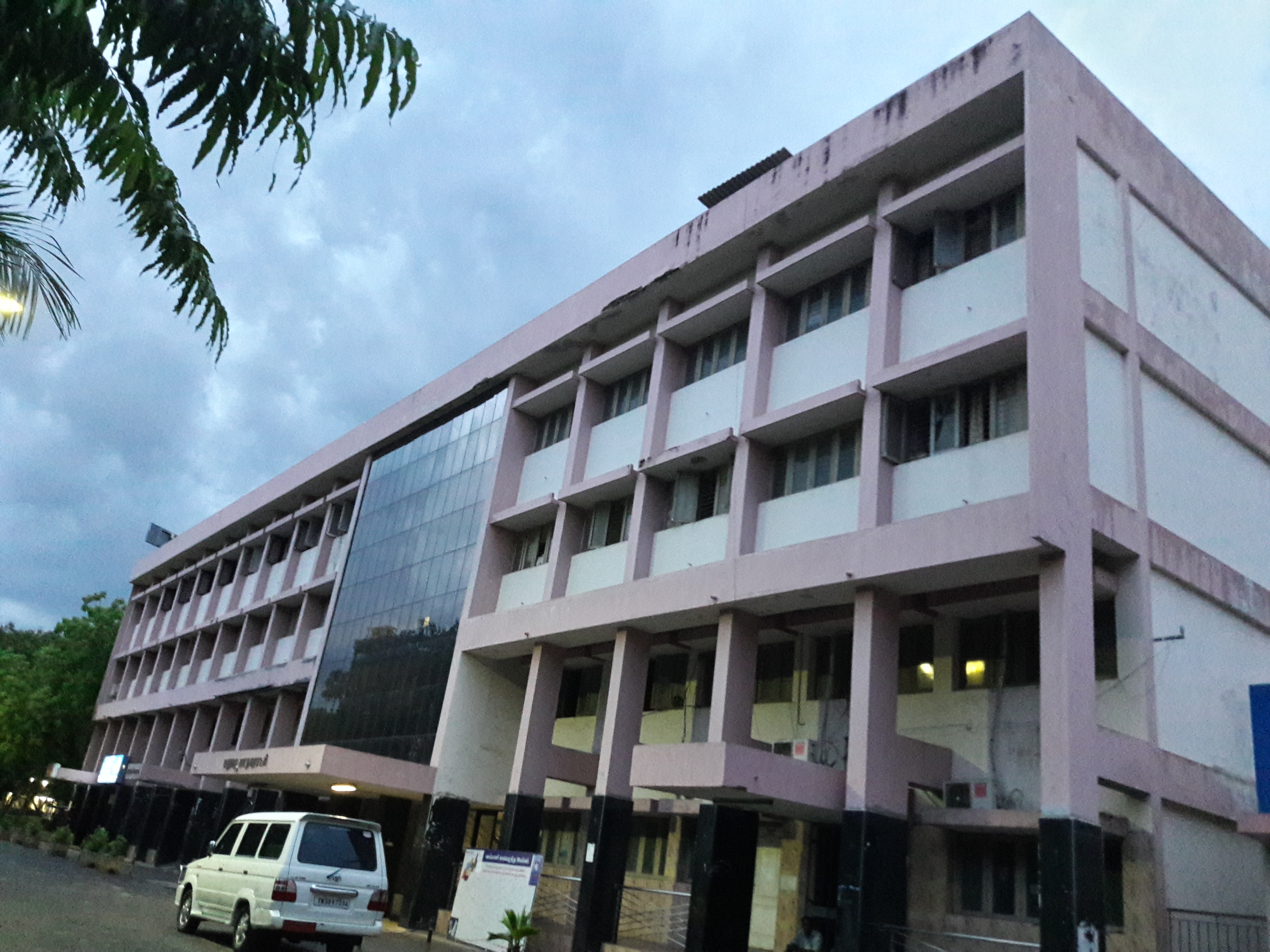
Front view of the corporation office

The municipality of Madurai was constituted on 1 November 1866 as per the Town Improvement Act of 1865. The municipality was headed by a chairperson and elections were regularly conducted for the post except during the period 1891 to 1896, when no elections were held due to violent factionalism. During the early years of independent India, the Madurai municipality was dominated by reformists of the Indian National Congress. Madurai was upgraded to a municipal corporation on 1 May 1971 as per the Madurai City Municipal Corporation Act, 1971. It is the second oldest municipal corporation in Tamil Nadu, after Chennai. The functions of the municipality are devolved into six departments: General, Engineering, Revenue, Public Health, Town planning, and the Computer Wing. All these departments are under the control of a Municipal Commissioner, who is the supreme executive head. The legislative powers are vested in a body of 100 members, one each from the 100 wards. The legislative body is headed by an elected Mayor assisted by a Deputy Mayor. The corporation received several awards in 2008 for implementing development works.

The city of Madurai is represented in the Tamil Nadu Legislative Assembly by six elected members, one each for the Madurai East, Madurai West, Madurai North, Madurai Central, Madurai South and the Thirupparankundram constituencies. Most of Madurai city comes under the Madurai Lok Sabha constituency and elects a member to the Lok Sabha, the lower house of the Parliament of India, once every five years. From 1957, the Madurai parliament seat was held by the Indian National Congress seven times in the 1962–67, 1971–77, 1977–80, 1980–84, 1984–89, 1989–91 and 1991 elections. The Communist Party of India (Marxist) won the seat three times during 1967–1971, 1999–2004 and 2004–09 general elections. The Communist Party of India (1957–61), Tamil Maanila Congress (Moopanar) (1996–98), Janata Party (1998), Dravida Munnetra Kazhagam (2009–2014) and All India Anna Dravida Munnertra Kazhagam (2014–2020) have each won once. Part of the city which falls under Thirupparankundram assembly constituency comes under the Virudhunagar Lok Sabha constituency.

Law and order is enforced by the Tamil Nadu Police, which, for administrative purposes, has constituted Madurai city as a separate district. The district is divided into four sub-divisions, namely Thallakulam, Anna Nagar, Thilagar Thidal and Town, with a total of 27 police stations. The Madurai city police force is headed by a Commissioner of police, assisted by Deputy Commissioners. Enforcement of law and order in the suburban areas are handled by the Madurai district police. In 2008, the crime rate in the city was 283.2 per 100,000 people, accounting for 1.1 per cent of all crimes reported in major cities in India, and it was ranked 19th among 35 major cities in India. As of 2008, Madurai recorded the second highest SLL (Special and Local Laws) crimes, at 22,728, among cities in Tamil Nadu. However, Madurai had the second lowest crime rate at 169.1 of all the cities in Tamil Nadu. The city is also the seat of a bench of the Madras High Court, one of only a few outside the state capitals of India. It started functioning in July 2004.

In Swachh Survekshan 2025 report, Madurai was ranked as the dirtiest city in India among those with a population of over one million. Despite its cultural heritage and tourism appeal, the city has struggled with sanitation and waste management.

Elected representatives

Members of Parliament (Lok Sabha, elected 2024)

Madurai district is represented in the Lok Sabha by three members, elected in the 2024 general election. Some constituencies extend into neighbouring districts, so only the assembly segments within Madurai district are listed.

No.	Parliamentary constituency	Assembly segments in Madurai district	Member of Parliament	Party
32	Madurai	Melur, Madurai East, Madurai North, Madurai South, Madurai Central, Madurai West	S. Venkatesan	CPI(M)
33	Theni	Sholavandan (SC), Usilampatti	Thanga Tamilselvan	DMK
34	Virudhunagar	Thiruparankundram, Thirumangalam	B. Manickam Tagore	INC

Members of the Legislative Assembly (Tamil Nadu, elected in 2026)

The district has ten assembly constituencies in the Tamil Nadu Legislative Assembly, elected in the 2026 state election.

No.	Assembly constituency	Member	Party
188	Melur	P. Viswanathan	INC
189	Madurai East	S. Karthikeyan	TVK
190	Sholavandan (SC)	M. V. Karuppaiah	TVK
191	Madurai North	A. Kallanai	TVK
192	Madurai South	M. M. Gopison	TVK
193	Madurai Central	Madhar Badhurudeen	TVK
194	Madurai West	S. R. Thangapandi	TVK
195	Thiruparankundram	R. Nirmalkumar	TVK
196	Thirumangalam	M. Manimaran	DMK
197	Usilampatti	M. Vijay	TVK

=== Municipal finance ===
According to financial data published on the CityFinance Portal of the Ministry of Housing and Urban Affairs, the Madurai Municipal Corporation reported total revenue receipts of ₹570 crore (US$69 million) and total expenditure of ₹588 crore (US$71 million) in 2022–23. Tax revenue accounted for about 39.5% of the total revenue, while the corporation received ₹156 crore in grants during the financial year.

== Transport ==
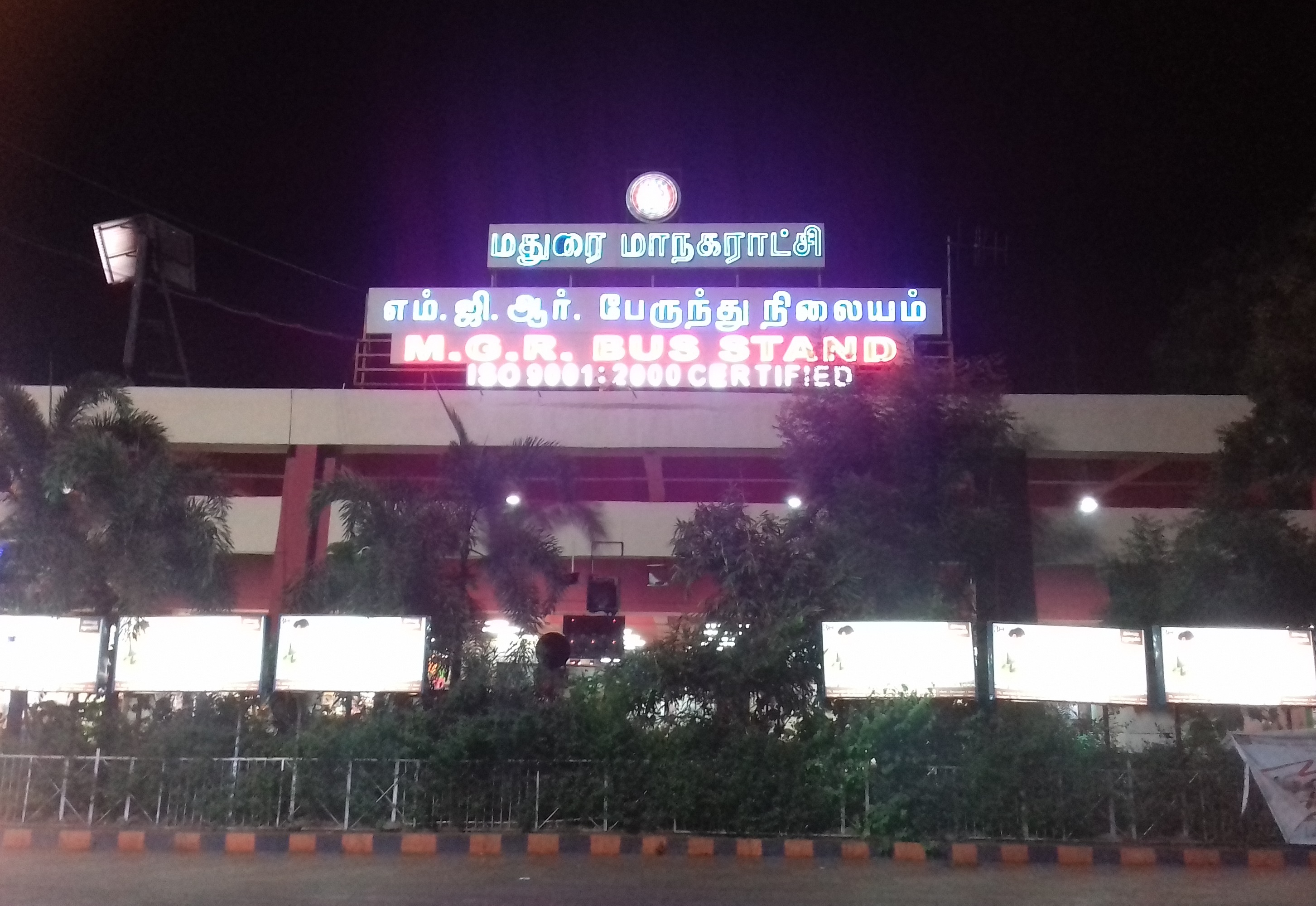
M.G.R. Bus Stand (Mattuthavani)

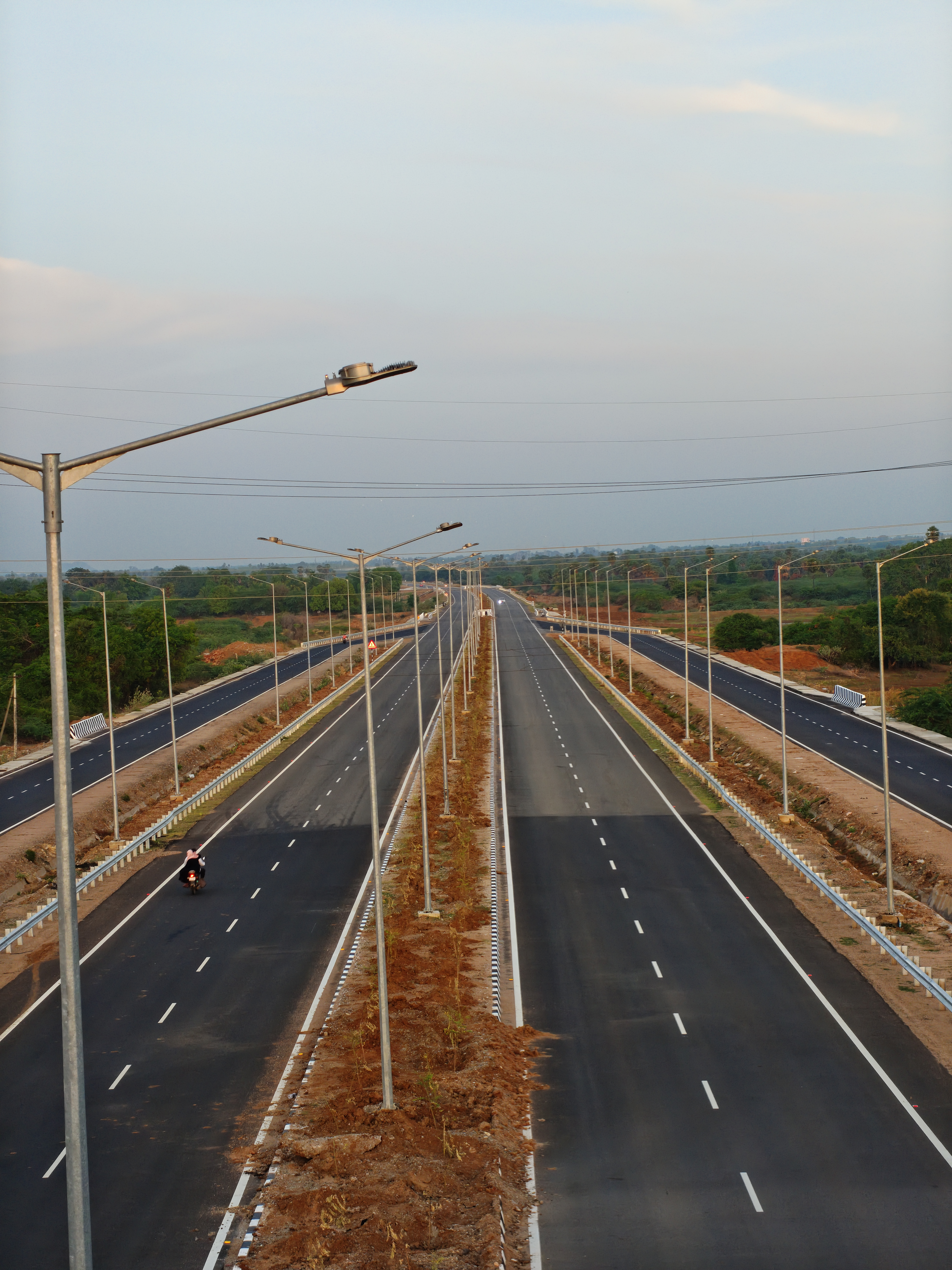
Karaikudi Madurai Green Field Highway

The National Highways NH 7, NH 45B, NH 208 and NH 49 pass through Madurai. The state highways passing through the city are SH-32, SH-33 and SH-72, which connect various parts of Madurai district. Madurai is one of the seven circles of the Tamil Nadu State Highway network. Madurai is the headquarters of the Tamil Nadu State Transport Corporation (Madurai) and provides local and inter city bus transport across four districts namely Madurai, Dindigul, Theni, and Virudhunagar. Madurai has three major bus stands, namely, M.G. Ramachandran Mattuthavani Integrated Bus Terminus (MGRMBS), Arappalayam Bus Terminus and Periyar Bus Stand. There are 12,754 registered three-wheeled vehicles i.e., auto rickshaws which are commercially available for renting within the city. Over the government operated city buses that are used for public transport, there are 236 registered private mini-buses that support local transportation.

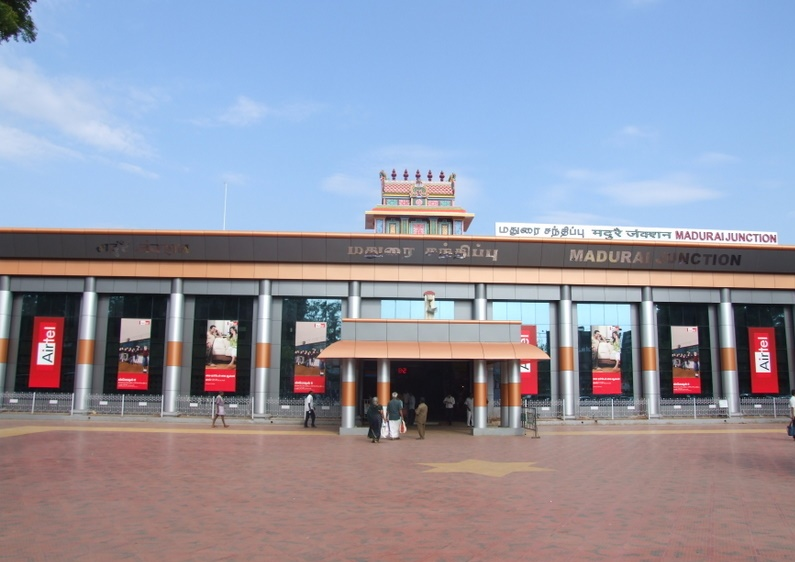
Madurai Junction railway station, the main railway station of Madurai

Madurai Junction is an important railway junction in southern Tamil Nadu and constitutes a separate division of the Southern Railway zone. This junction connects with Manamadurai Junction in south east, Virudhunagar Junction in south, Bodinayakanur in West and Dindigul Junction in north east. There are direct trains from Madurai connecting the important cities in Tamil Nadu like Chennai, Coimbatore, Kanyakumari, Tiruchirappalli, Tirunelveli, Thoothukudi, Mayiladuthurai, Rameswaram, Thanjavur, Tiruttani, Tirupathi and Virudhachalam. Madurai has rail connectivity with most important cities like Mysore, Bengaluru, Guruvayur, Trivandrum, Punalur, Mangalore, Hubballi, Mumbai, Pune, New Delhi, Vasco Da Gama, Hyderabad, Santragachi, Howrah, Ahmedabad, Rajkot, Jamnagar, Vadodara, Surat, Siliguri, Chandigarh, Jammu, Jaipur, Bikaner Vijayawada, Vishakhapatnam, Bhubaneswar, Nagpur, Bhopal, Jhansi, Guwaloir, Agra, Varanasi several cities in India. Madurai has rail connectivity with important cities and towns in India. The state government has announced the Madurai Monorail in 2011; as of 2020, it remains in planning stages.

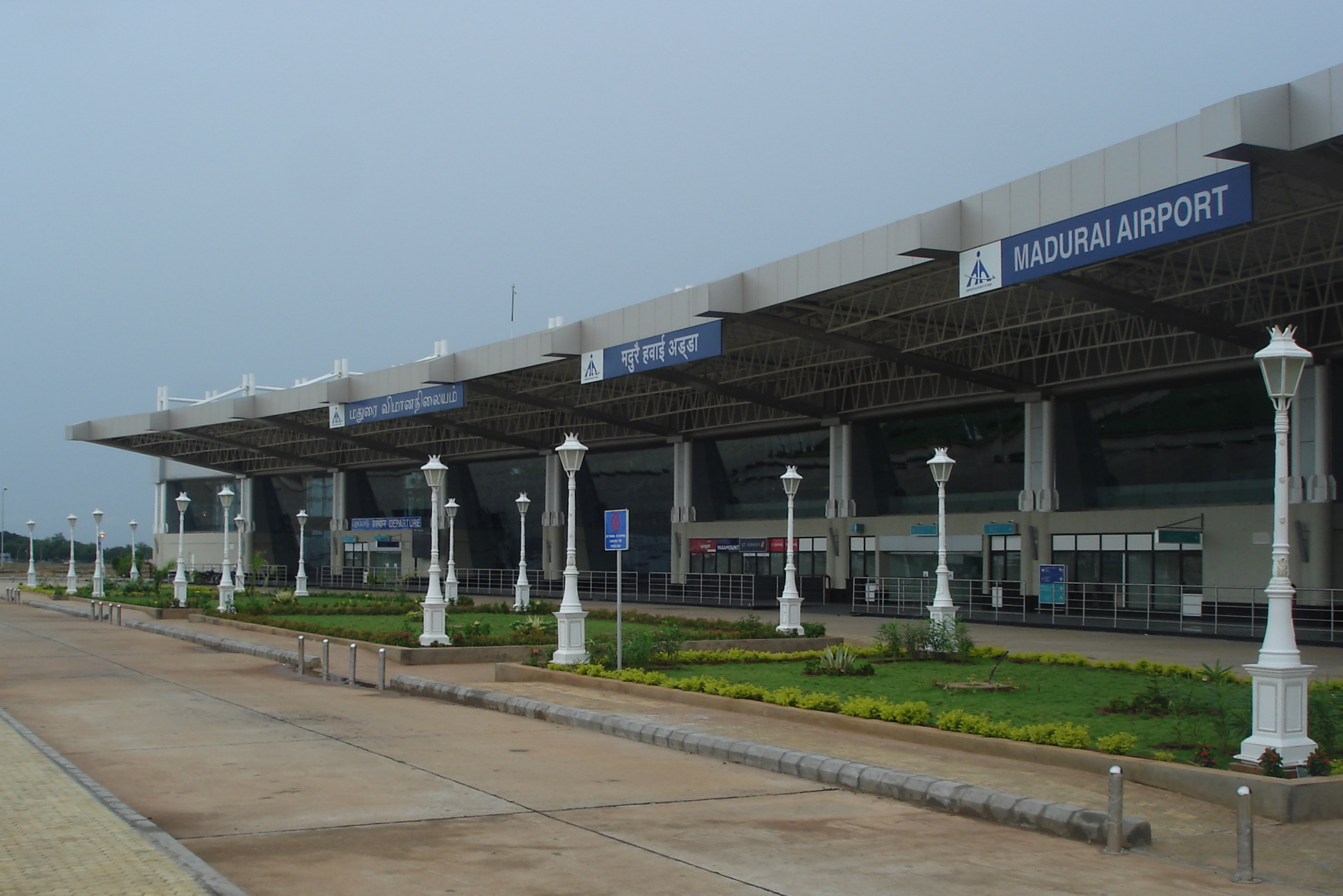
Madurai International Airport, Avaniyapuram

Madurai International Airport, first used by the Royal Air Force in World War II in 1942, is located 12 kilometres from the city. The airport was declared a customs airport in 2012 allowing limited number of international flights. It offers domestic flights to some cities in India and international services to Colombo, Dubai and for Singapore on a daily basis started by Air India Express since February 2018. The carriers operating from the airport are Air India, Air India Express, SpiceJet, IndiGo and SriLankan Airlines. The airport handled 842,300 passengers between April 2015 and March 2016.

== Education ==
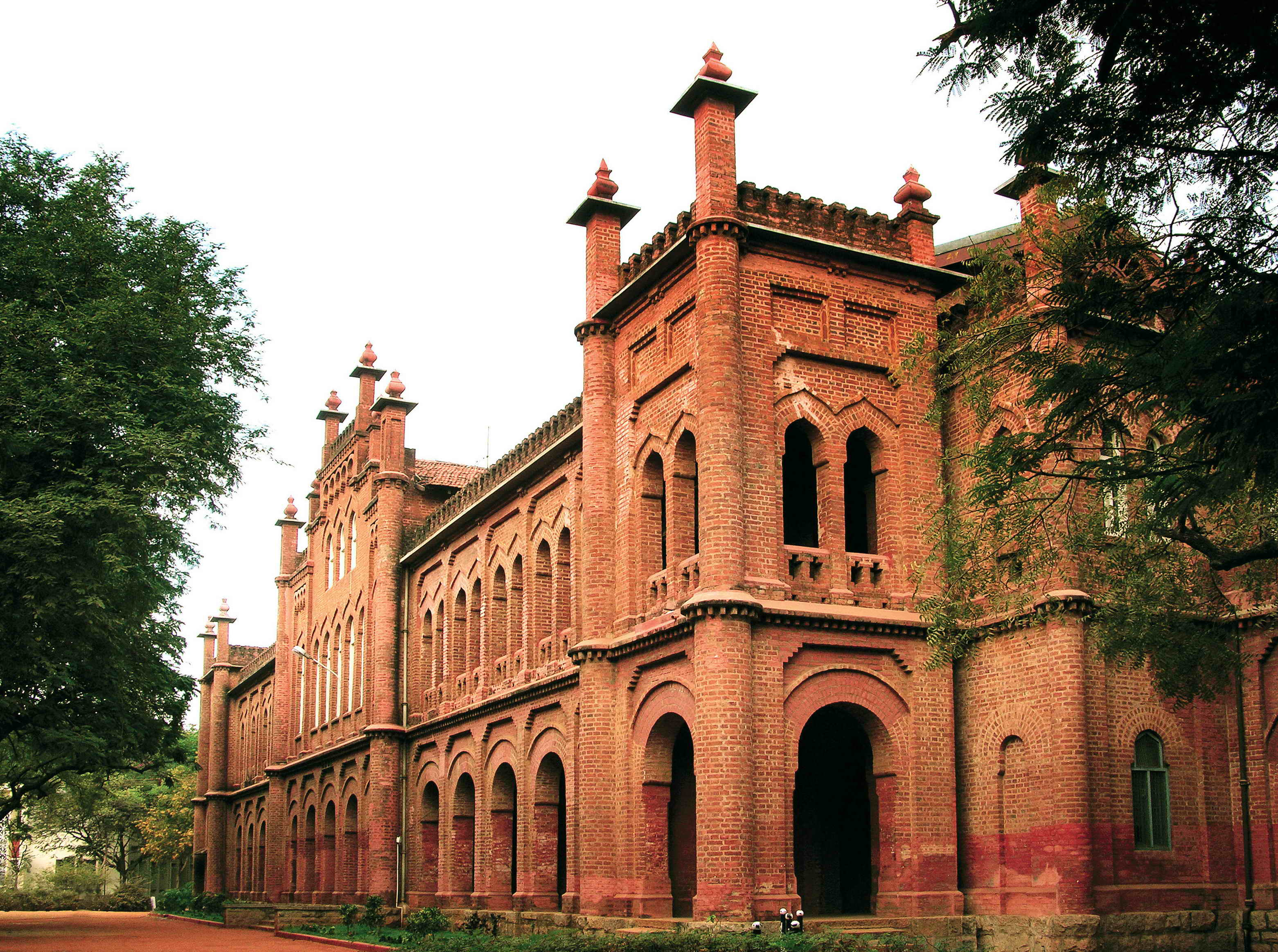
The American College, started in 1881, is the oldest college in the city.

Madurai has been an academic centre of learning for Tamil culture, literature, art, music and dance for centuries. All three assemblies of the Tamil language, the Tamil Sangam (about the 3rd century BCE to the 3rd century CE), were said to have been held at Madurai. Tamil poets of different epochs participated in these assemblies, and their compositions are referred to as Sangam literature. During the third Tamil sangam, the comparative merit of the poets was decided by letting the works float in the lotus tank of the temple. It was believed that a divine force would cause the work of superior merit to float on the surface, while the inferior ones would sink.

The American College is the oldest college in Madurai, and was established in 1881 by American Christian missionaries. The Lady Doak College, established in 1948, is the oldest women's college in Madurai. The Thiagarajar College (established in 1949), the Madura College (established in 1889), the Fatima College (a women's general degree college, established in 1953), the Sourashtra College (established in 1967), the M.S.S. Wakf Board College (established in 1964), and the Tamil Nadu Polytechnic College (established in 1946), are the oldest educational institutions of the city. The Madurai Kamaraj University (originally called the Madurai University), established in 1966, is a state-run university which has 109 affiliated arts and science colleges in Madurai and neighbouring districts. There are 47 approved institutions of the university in and around the city, consisting of autonomous colleges, aided colleges, self-financing colleges, constituent colleges, evening colleges and other approved institutions.

There are seven polytechnical schools and five Industrial training institutes (ITIs) in Madurai, with the Government ITI and the Government Polytechnic for Women being the most prominent of them all. There are two government medical institutes in Madurai, the Madurai Medical College and the Homoeopathic Medical College, Thirumangalam and 11 paramedical institutes. There are fifteen engineering colleges in Madurai affiliated to the Anna University, with the Thiagarajar College of Engineering being the oldest. The Madurai Law College, established in 1979, is one of the seven government law colleges in the state. It is administered by the Tamil Nadu Government Department of Legal Studies, and affiliated with the Tamil Nadu Dr. Ambedkar Law University. There are three teacher training institutes, two music colleges, three management institutes and 30 arts and sciences colleges in Madurai. The agricultural college and research institute in Madurai, started in 1965 by the state government, provides agricultural education to aspirants in the southern districts of Tamil Nadu. An All India Institute of Medical Sciences, a premier medical institution, is also under construction in Madurai and will cover 224 acres (910,000 m^{2}) of land, at an estimated cost of ₹1,264 crore (US$140 million), and additionally allotted ₹736 crore (US$79 million) total around ₹2,000 crore (US$210 million) in the sub-urban Thoppur Madurai district.

=== Secondary schools ===
There are a total of 369 primary, secondary and higher secondary schools in the city. Notable schools include

- Sethupathi Higher Secondary School

== Economy ==
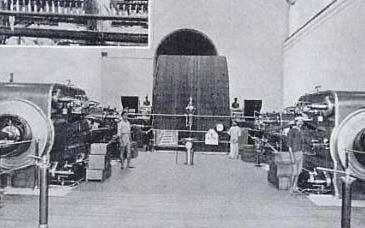
Harvey Mills, c. 1914

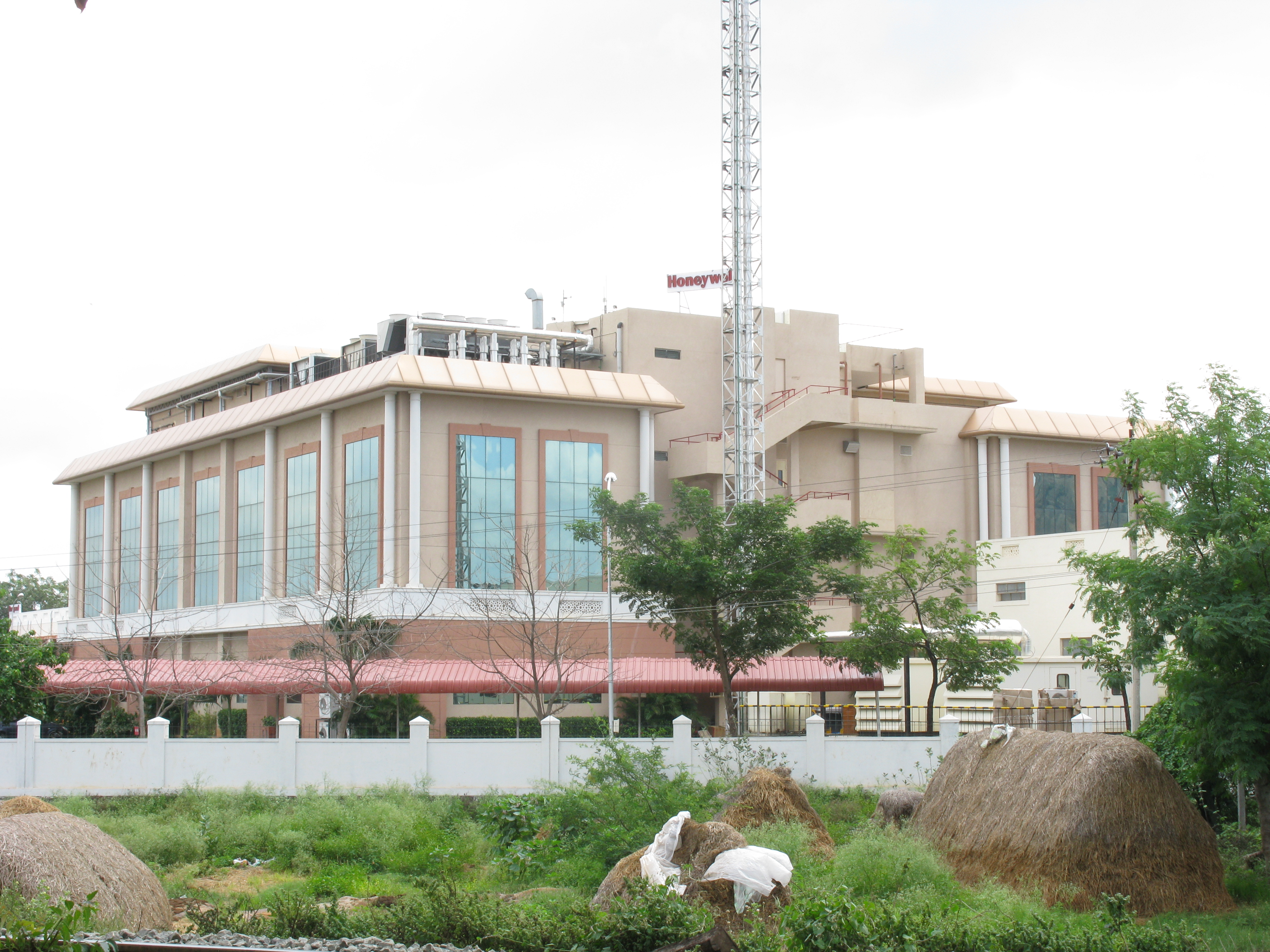
A technology development centre at Thirupparankundram

Madurai was traditionally an agrarian society, with rice paddies as the main crop. Cotton crop cultivation in the regions with black soil in Madurai district was introduced during the Nayaka rule during the 16th century to increase the revenue from agriculture. The paddy fields cultivated in the Vaigai delta across Madurai North, Melur, Nilakottai and Uthamapalayam are known as "double-crop paddy belts". Farmers in the district supplement their income with subsidiary occupations like dairy farming, poultry-farming, pottery, brick making, mat-weaving and carpentry. Madurai is famed for its jasmine plantations, called Madurai Malli, primarily carried out at the foothills of the Kodaikanal hills and traded at the Madurai morning flower market. An average of 2,000 farmers sell flowers daily at the flower market.

With the advent of small scale industry (SSI) after 1991, the industrialisation of Madurai increased employment in the sector across the district from 63,271 in 1992–93 to 166,121 persons in 2001–02. Madurai is one of the few rubber growing areas in South India, and there are rubber-based industries in Madurai. Gloves, sporting goods, mats, other utility products and automobile rubber components are the most produced items by these industries. Automobile manufacturers are the major consumers of rubber components produced in the city. There are numerous textile, granite and chemical industries operating in Madurai. Kashmir gold granite and Kashmir white granite are the trade names of two types of granite produced in Madurai.

Madurai is promoted as a tier II city for IT and Industry. Kappalur which is sub-urban of Madurai is business hub for automotive industries such as KUN BMW, Mercedes-Benz, Isuzu, Volkswagen, Toyota, Mahindra, Tata, Maruti Suzuki, Mitsubishi, Ashok Leyland, Jeep, Fiat India (FCA). The government has created Uchapatti-Thoppur satellite Township in Kappalur. Small Industries Development Corporation Kappalur has many polymer and houseware manufacturing units. Some software companies have opened their offices in Madurai. Software Technology Parks of India, an agency of the Government of India, has authorised several such companies to receive benefits under its national information technology development program. The state government proposed two IT-based Special Economic Zones (SEZ) in Madurai, and these have been fully occupied by various IT companies, HCLTech and Honeywell have their own campuses in ELCOT IT Park in Madurai.

== Religious sites ==
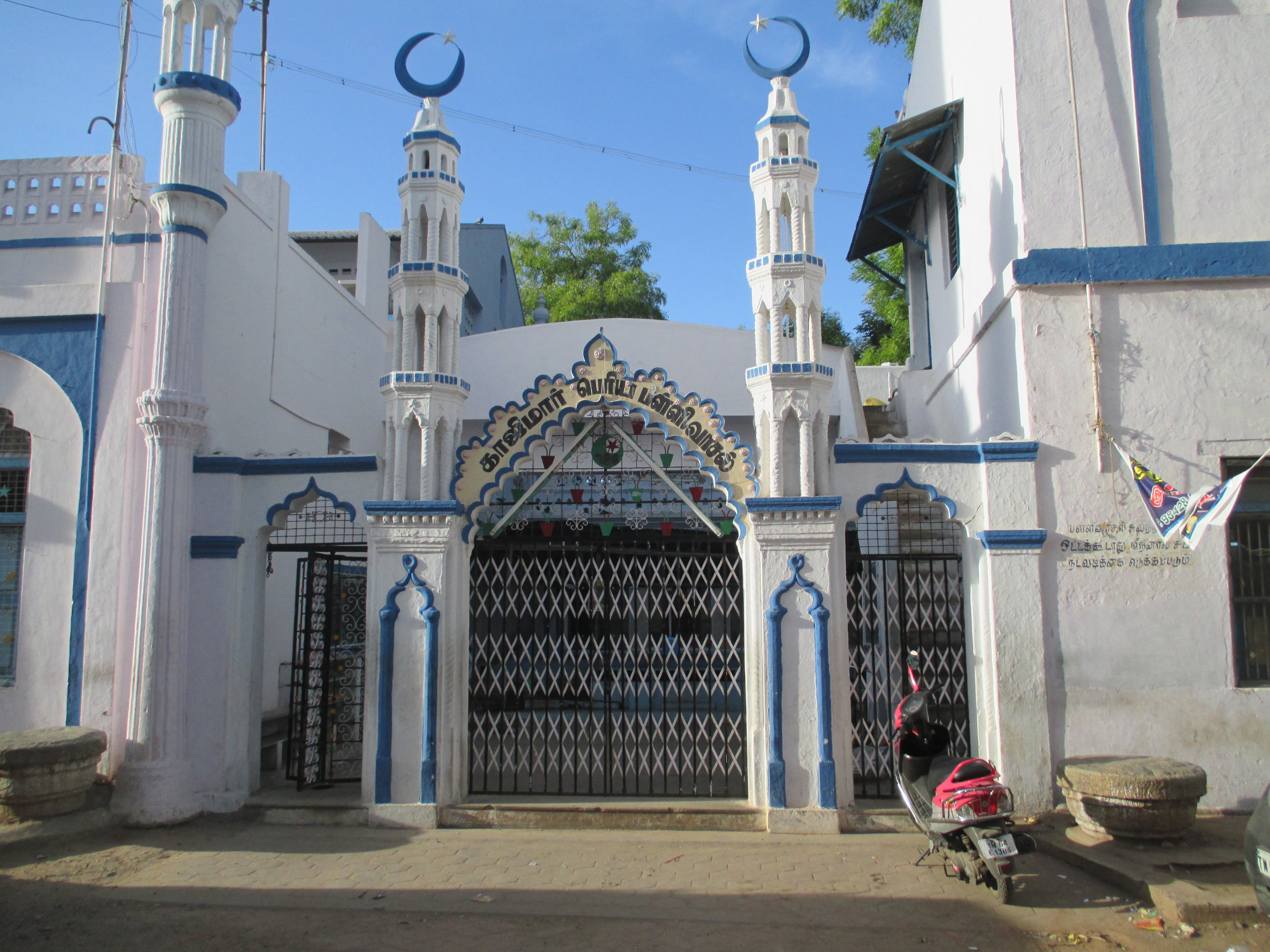
Kazimar Big Mosque, the first and oldest mosque in the city

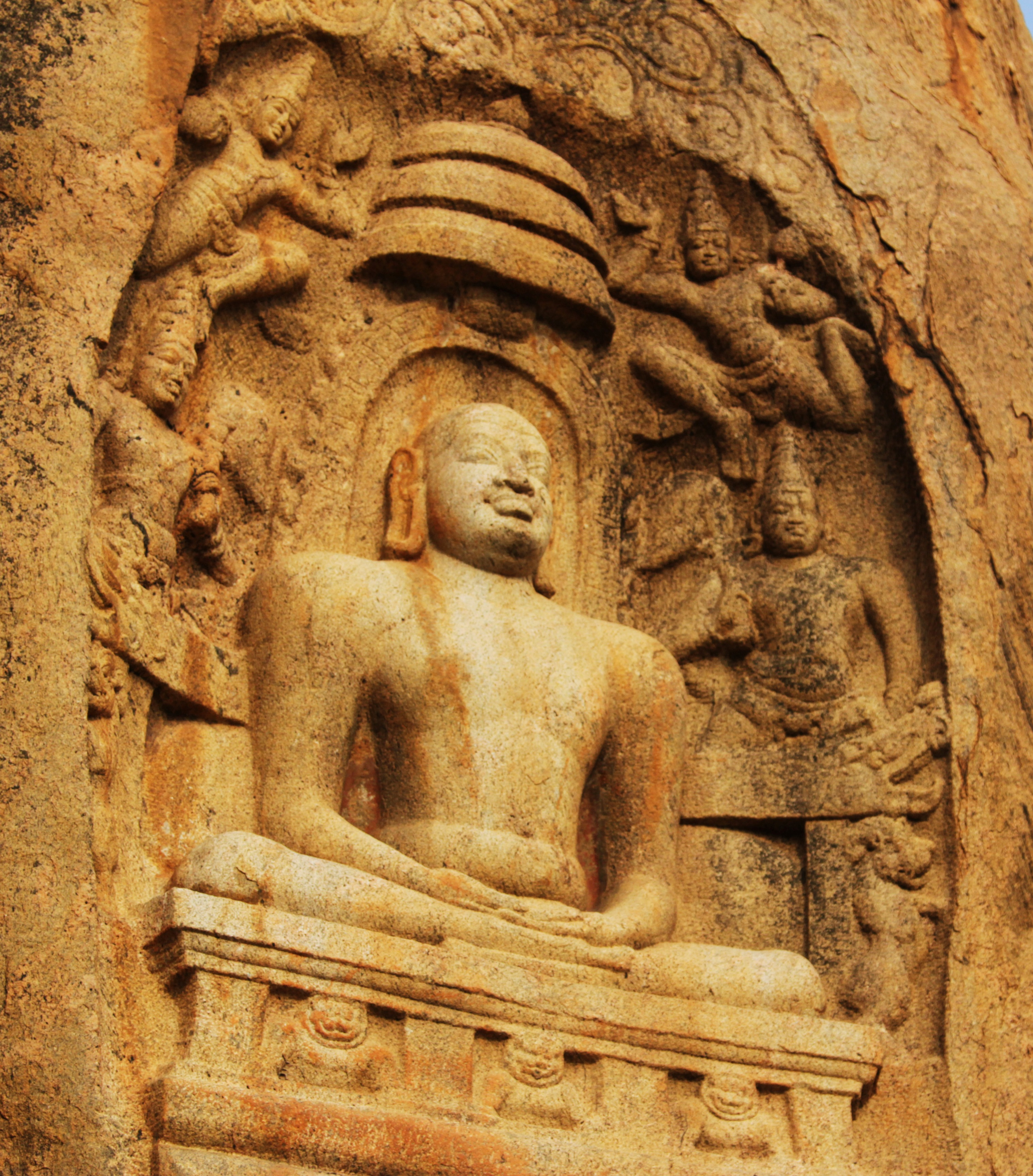
Mahavira at Samanar Hills

The Meenakshi Amman Temple is a historic Hindu temple located on the south side of the Vaigai River in Madurai, which is one of the most prominent landmarks of the city. It is dedicated to Parvati known as Meenakshi and her consort, Shiva as Sundareswarar. The complex houses 14 gopurams (gateway towers) ranging from 45–50 metres (148–164 ft) in height, the tallest being the southern tower, 51.9 metres (170 ft) high. There are also two golden sculptured vimana (shrines) over the sanctum of the main deities. The temple is a significant symbol for Tamils and has been mentioned since antiquity in Tamil literature, though the present structure was built between 1623 and 1655 CE. The temple attracts 15,000 visitors a day and around 25,000 during Fridays. There are an estimated 33,000 sculptures in the temple.

The Koodal Azhagar Temple is a historic Hindu temple located on the south side of the Vaigai River in Madurai, which is one of the most prominent landmarks of the city. The temple is dedicated to Maha Vishnu. It has idols of the Navagraha (nine planet deities), which are otherwise found only in Shiva temples. the temple is glorified in the Naalayira Divya Prabandham, the early medieval Tamil canon of the Alvar saints from the 6th–9th centuries CE. It is one of the 108 Divya Desams dedicated to Vishnu, who is worshipped as Viyooga Sundarrajan, and his consort Lakshmi as Mathuravalli. A granite wall surrounds the temple, enclosing all its shrines. The temple has a five-tiered rajagopuram, the gateway tower. The temple is originally believed to be built by the Pandyas, with later additions by the Vijayanagara Empire and the Madurai Nayaks kings who commissioned pillared halls and major shrines of the temple during the 16th century.

The Kallalagar Temple, Alagar Koyil, is a celebrated Vishnu temple 21 kilometres (13 mi) northeast of Madurai situated at the foothills of Solaimalai. The deity, Kallazhagar, is believed to be the brother of Meenakshi and worshiped by Meenakshi, the presiding deity at the Meenakshi temple. The festival calendars of these two temples overlap during the Meenakshi Thirukalyanam festival. The temple is glorified in the Naalayira Divya Prabandham, the early medieval Tamil canon of the Alvar saints from the 5th–9th centuries CE. It is one of the 108 Divya Desams dedicated to Maha Vishnu, who is worshiped as Kallalagar, and his consort Lakshmi as Thirumagal. This temple is called as Thirumaliruncholai in Sangam literatures and Naalayira Divya Prabandham sung by Tamil Alvar saints.

The Murugan Temple of Pazhamudircholai, one of the other six abodes of the Hindu god Murugan, is located atop the Solaimalai hill. Thiruparankundram is a hill 8 kilometres (5.0 mi) away from Madurai, where the Hindu god Murugan is believed to have married Deivanai. The temple is the first among the six holy abodes of Murugan, the Arupadai Veedu, literally "Six Battle Camps", and one of the most visited tourist spots in Madurai. The temple has a wide range of Hindu gods carved on the walls.

The Kazimar Big Mosque is the first Muslim place of worship in the city. It was constructed under the supervision of Kazi Syed Tajuddin, believed to be a descendant of the prophet Muhammed. He came from Oman and received the piece of land from the Pandya ruler, Kulasekara Pandiyan during the 13th century. It is claimed to be the oldest Islamic monument in Madurai. The dargah of Madurai Hazrats called as Madurai Maqbara is located inside the mosque. The Tirupparankunram Dargah is the grave of an Islamic saint who came from Jeddah; his festival is celebrated during Rajab every Hijri year.

The Goripalayam Mosque is located in Gorippalayam, the name of which is derived from the Persian word Gor, meaning Grave. The graves of Hazrat Sulthan Alauddin Badhusha, Hazrat Sulthan Shamsuddeen Badhusha and Hazrat Sulthan Ghaibuddeen Badhusha are found here. The urus festival of this dargah is held on 15th night of the Islamic month of Rabi al-awwal on every hijri year. St. Mary's Cathedral is the seat of the Roman Catholic Archdiocese of Madurai. Samanar Malai and Panchapandavar Malai are important Jain centres.

== Culture and tourism ==
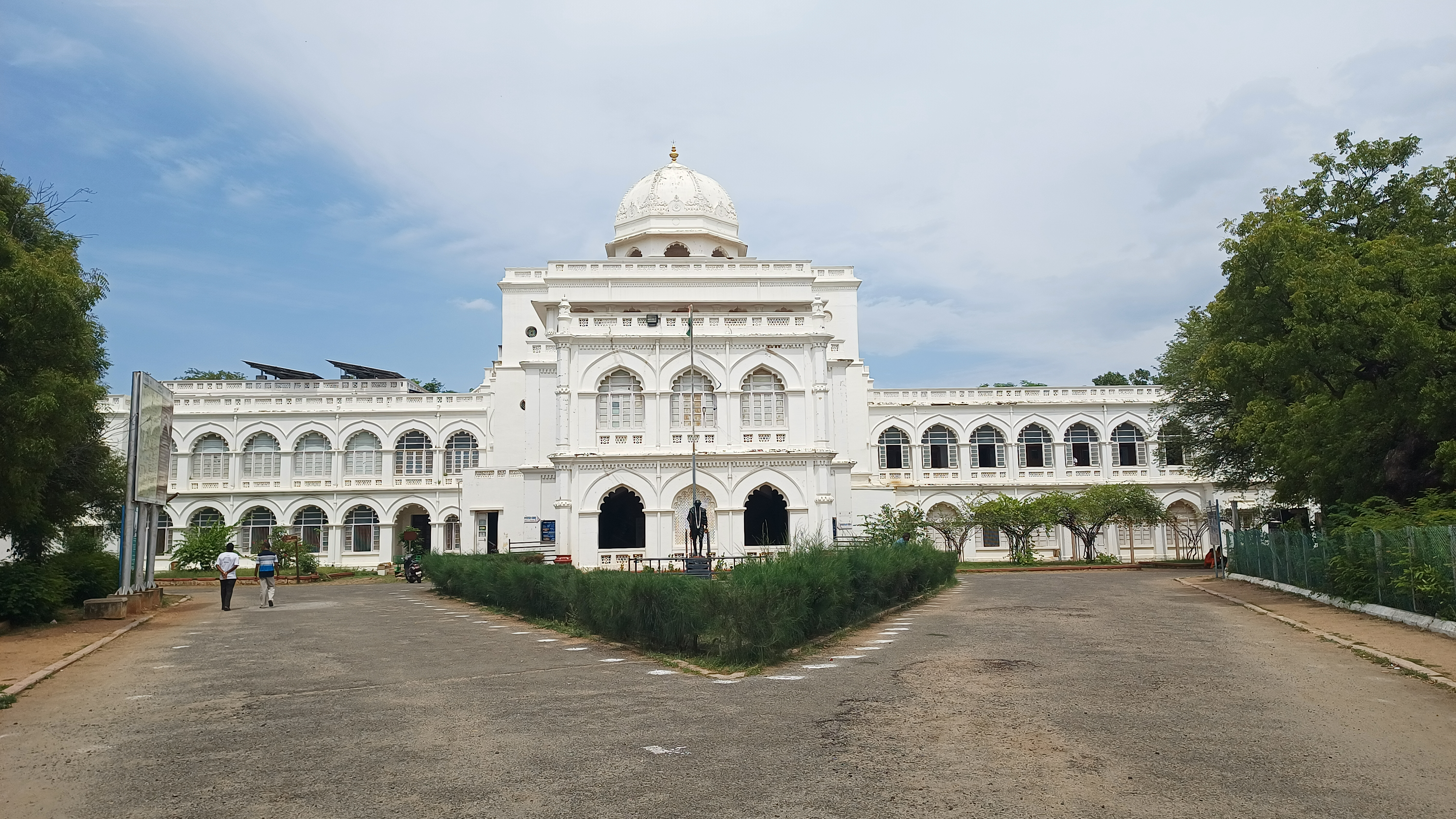
Gandhi Memorial Museum, one of the five Gandhi Sangrahalayas in India

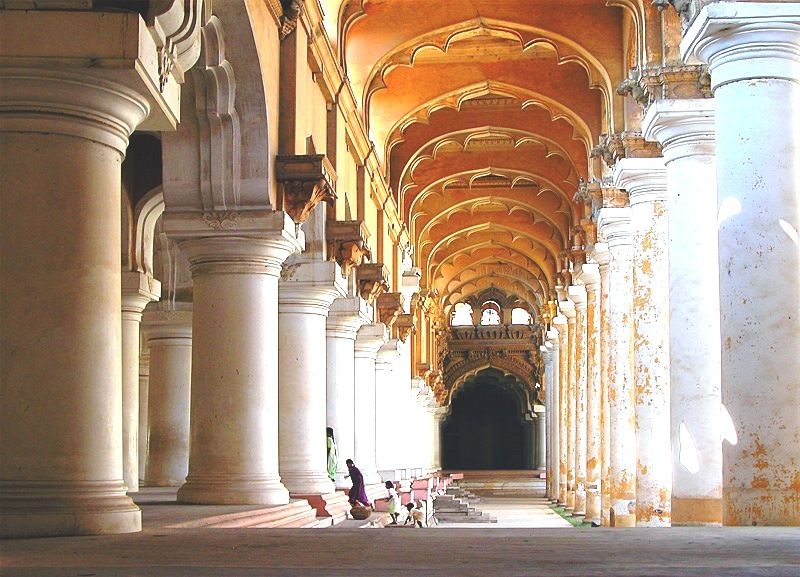
Pillared halls of Thirumalai Nayakar Palace, built during 1636 CE and a national monument

Madurai is popularly called Thoonga Nagaram meaning the city that never sleeps, on account of the active night life. The city attracts a large number of tourists from within the country and abroad. About 9,100,000 tourists visited Madurai in 2010, out of which foreigners numbered 524,000. The palace complex of Thirumalai Nayak Palace was constructed in the Indo-Saracenic style by Thirumalai Nayakar in 1636 CE. It is a national monument maintained by the Tamil Nadu Archaeological Department. The daily sound and light show organized by the department explains the virtues of King Thirumalai and the features of the palace. The palace of Rani Mangamma has been renovated to house one of the five Gandhi Sanghralayas (Gandhi Memorial Museum, Madurai) in the country. It includes a part of the blood-stained garment worn by Gandhi when he was assassinated by Nathuram Godse. A visit by Martin Luther King Jr. to the museum inspired him to lead peaceful protests against discrimination.

The Eco park, situated in Tallakulam, features fountains and lighting in trees using optical fibres. Rajaji children park, maintained by the Corporation of Madurai, is situated between the Gandhi museum and the Tamukkam grounds – it has a visitor average of 5,000 per day during holidays and 2,000–3,000 on working days.

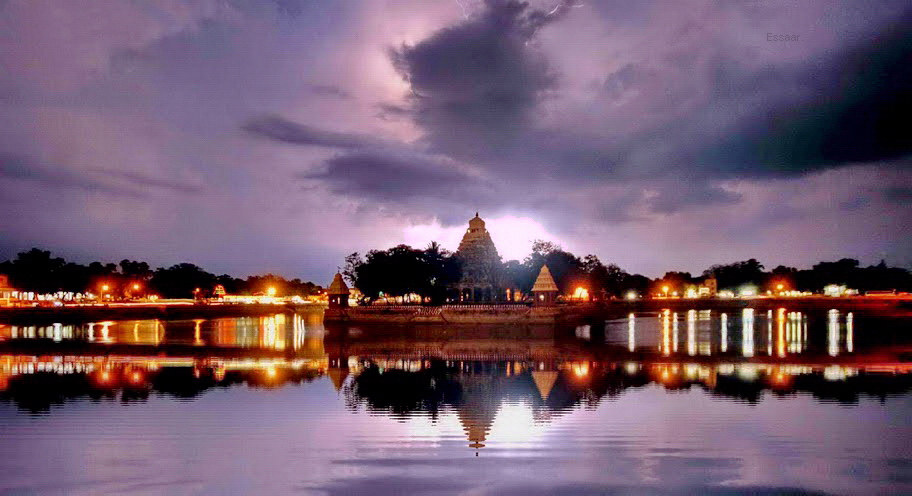
Mariamman Theppakkulam, the temple tank of Mariamman Temple

The people of Madurai celebrate numerous festivals, which include Meenakshi Tirukkalyanam, the Chittirai Festival and the Car Festival. The annual 10 day Meenakshi Tirukalyanam festival, also called the Chittirai festival, celebrated during April–May every year, attracts 1 million visitors. Legend has it that the Hindu god Vishnu, as Alagar, rode on a golden horse to Madurai to attend the celestial wedding of Meenakshi (Parvati) with Sundareswarar (Shiva). During the Cradle festival, the festive idols of Meenakshi and Sundareswarar are taken in procession to a mirror chamber and set on a rocking swing for nine days. Avanimoolam festival is celebrated during the month of September when the 64 sacred games of Hindu god Shiva, thiruvilayadal are recited. The Thepporchavam festival or float festival is celebrated in the month of January – February, on the full moon day of Tamil Month Thai to celebrate the birth anniversary of King Thirumalai Nayak. The decorated icons of the Meenakshi and her consort are taken out in a procession from the Meenakshi Temple to the Mariamman Teppakulam. The icons are then floated in the tank on a raft decked with flowers and flickering lamps.

The Santhanakoodu festivals in Madurai are celebrated on various days during the Islamic calendar year to commemorate Islamic saints.

== Media and utility services ==
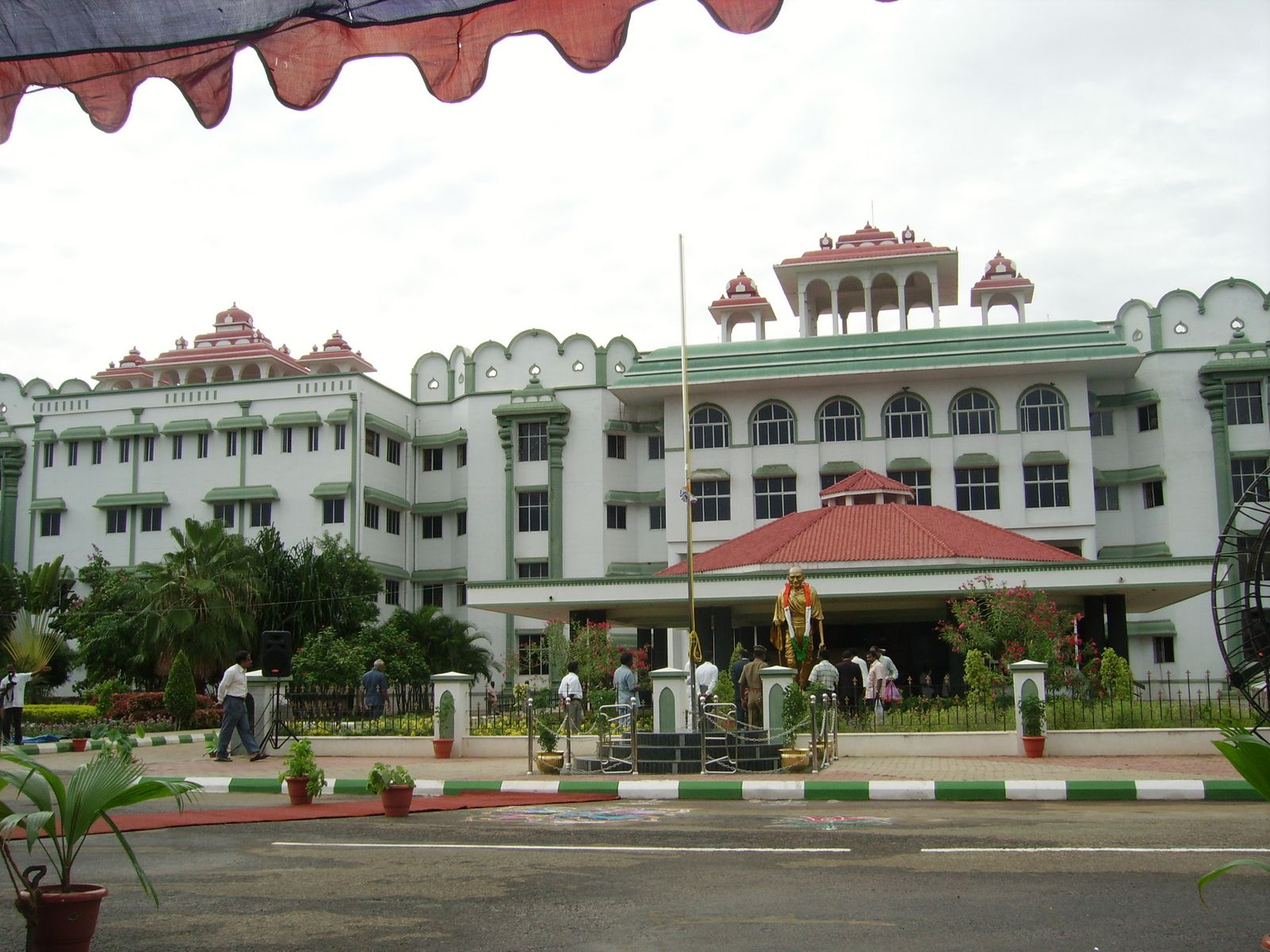
The Madurai Bench of Madras High Court

The city hosts several radio stations, including the state-owned All India Radio and private channels like Hello FM, Radio Mirchi, Suryan FM and Radio City. The Hindu, The New Indian Express and The Times of India are the three principal English-language daily newspapers which have Madurai editions. Deccan Chronicle, though not printed in the city, is another English-language daily newspaper available in the city. The most read Tamil-language daily morning newspapers include Dinamalar, Dina Thanthi, Dinamani and Dinakaran – all these newspapers have editions from Madurai. There are also daily Tamil evening newspapers like Tamil Murasu, Malai Murasu and Maalai Malar published in Madurai. Television broadcasting from Chennai for whole of Tamil Nadu was started on 15 August 1975. Direct-to-home cable television services are provided by DD Direct Plus and other private service providers.

Electricity supply to the city is regulated and distributed by the Tamil Nadu Electricity Board (TNEB). The city is the headquarters of the Madurai region of TNEB and along with its suburbs, forms the Madurai Metro Electricity Distribution Circle, which is further divided into six divisions. Water supply is provided by the Madurai City Corporation with overhead tanks and power pumps. In the period 2010–2011, a total of 950.6 lakh litres of water was supplied to 87,091 connections for households in Madurai.

About 400 metric tonnes of solid waste are collected from the city every day by door-to-door collection, and the subsequent source segregation and dumping is carried out by the sanitary department of the Corporation of Madurai All the major channels in Madurai are linked by the corporation to receive the flood water from primary, secondary and tertiary drains constructed along the roadsides to dispose of rain water. The sewer system was first established by the British in Madurai in 1924 to cover the core city area, which covers 30 per cent of the present city area. It was further expanded in 1959 and 1983 by a corporation plan. The 2011 Jawaharlal Nehru National Urban Renewal Mission covered 90 per cent of households with underground drainage system.

Madurai comes under the Madurai telecom district of the Bharat Sanchar Nigam Limited (BSNL), India's state-owned telecom and internet services provider. Both Global System for Mobile Communications (GSM) and Code division multiple access (CDMA) mobile services are available. Apart from telecom, BSNL also provides broadband internet service and Caller Line Identification (CLI) based internet service Netone.

A regional passport office was opened on 17 December 2007 and caters to the needs of nine districts. The city is served by the Government Rajaji Hospital. A branch of All India Institutes of Medical Sciences in Thoppur, in the outskirts of the city, is set to be completed by October 2026, as per Central government press release.

== Sports ==
Cricket and football are the two most popular sports in Madurai. Madurai is home to the Tamil Nadu Premier League cricket team Madurai Panthers, which bagged its maiden title in 2018. The Madurai International Hockey Stadium hosted the 2025 Men's FIH Hockey Junior World Cup, along with Chennai's Mayor Radhakrishnan Hockey Stadium.

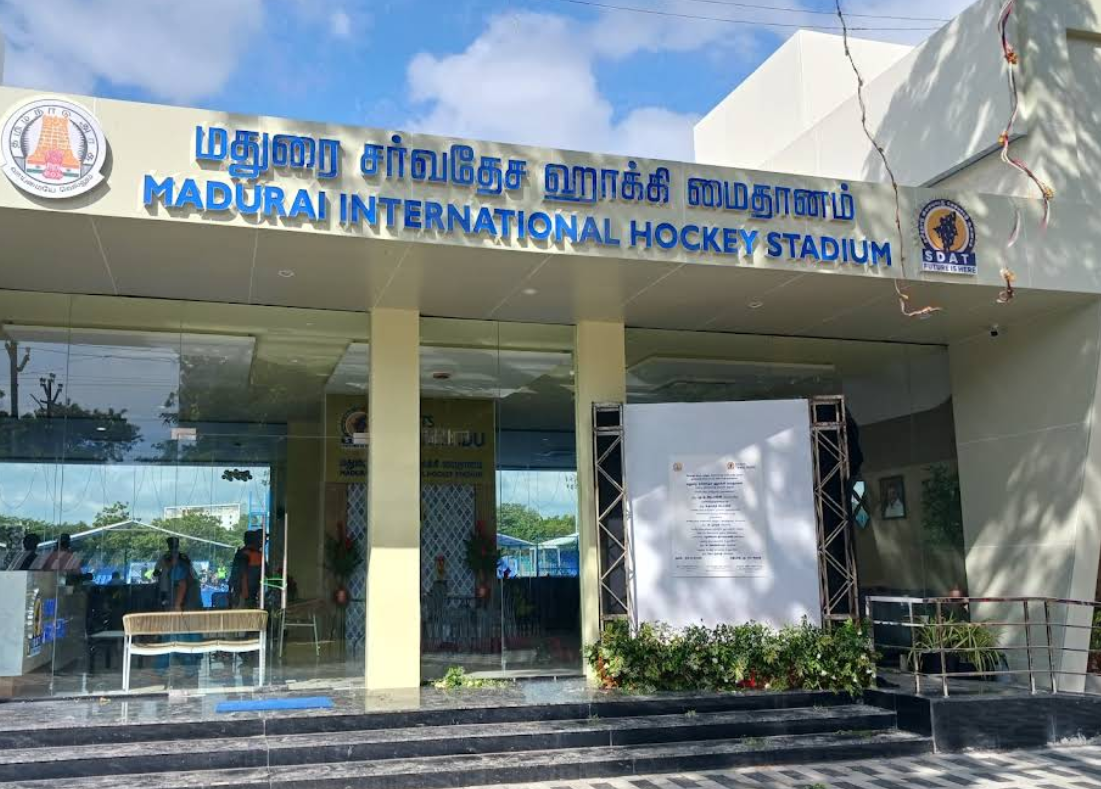
The Madurai International Hockey Stadium

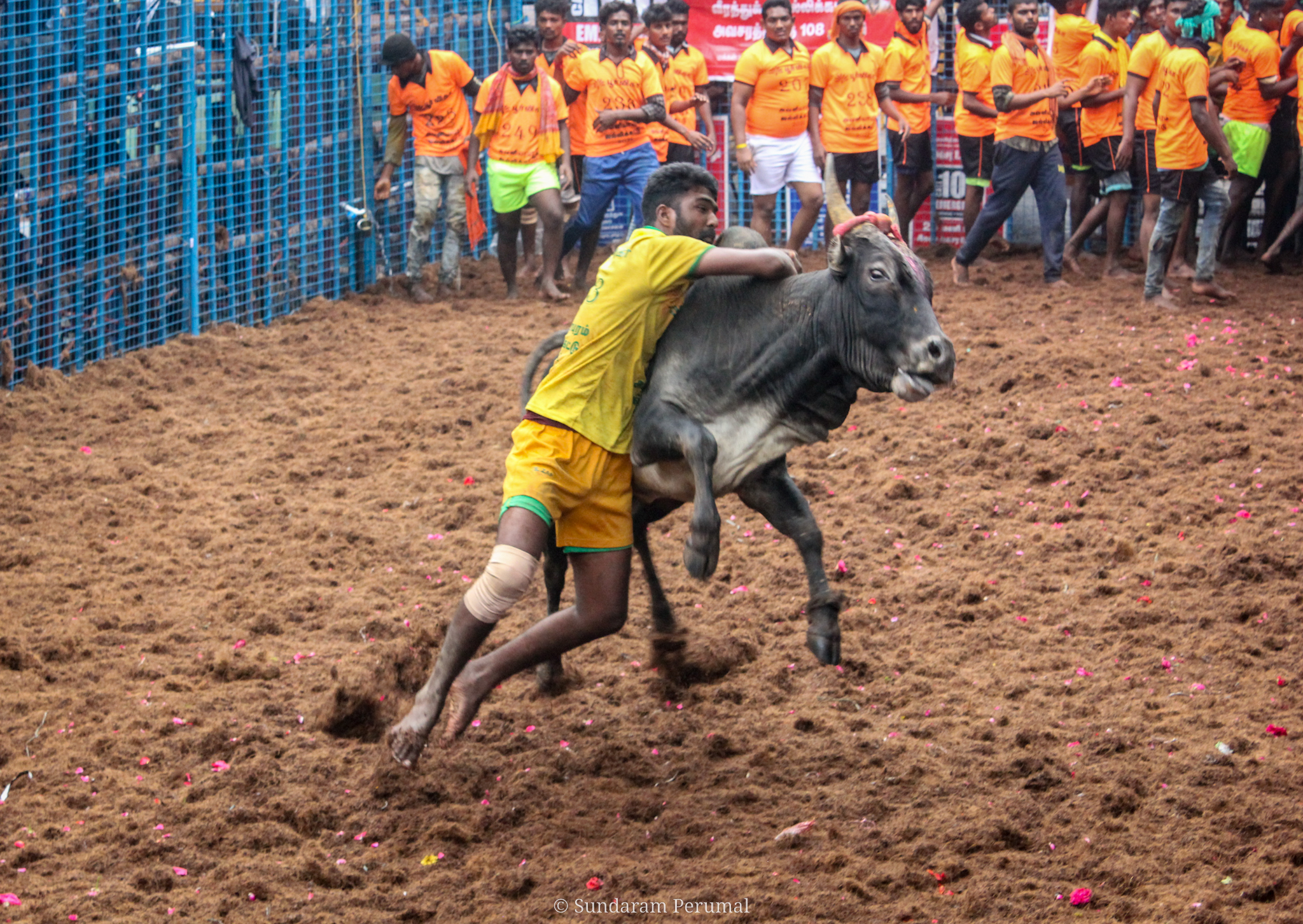
Jallikattu being held at Avaniapuram, Madurai.

Even with the rise of modern sports, traditional sports like kitti-pullu (gillidanda) and kabaddi continue to be popular among youngsters. Jallikattu is the most popular historical sport in Tamil Nadu, which is a part of the Pongal festival (harvest festival) celebrated during January. The bull taming event is held in the villages surrounding Madurai when people from the neighbouring villages throng the open grounds to watch men and bulls pitting their strengths against each other. Although the event was banned by the Supreme Court of India in 2014, large protests in 2017 led to the sport's reinstatement.

The MGR Race Course Stadium is an athletic stadium which has a 400 metres long synthetic track for athletic events and a 25 metres long swimming pool. Several national meets are held here. It also hosts several international and national level Kabbadi Championships. The Railway grounds at Arasaradi, the Medical college grounds and the Madura College Grounds are full-fledged cricket stadiums.

== See also ==
- Madurai metropolitan area
- Vaigai Dam
- Athisayam Theme park
- Largest Indian cities by GDP

== Sources ==
- City Development Plan of Madurai (PDF) (Report). Madurai: Madurai Corporation. 2004. Archived from the original (PDF) on 28 April 2015.
- Smith, Bardwell; Reynolds, Holly Baker (1987). The city as a sacred center: essays on six Asian contexts: Annual meetings. BRILL. ISBN 978-90-04-08471-1.
- King, Anthony D. (2005). Buildings and Society: Essays on the Social Development of the Built Environment. Taylor & Francis e-library. ISBN 978-0-203-48075-5.
- Shokoohy, Mehrdad (2003). Muslim Architecture of South India: The Sultanate of Ma'bar and the traditions of maritime settlers on the Malabar and Coramandel Coasts (Tamil Nadu, Kerala and Goa). Inter-India Publications. ISBN 978-0-415-30207-4.
