= Madurai Malli =

- Geographical indication
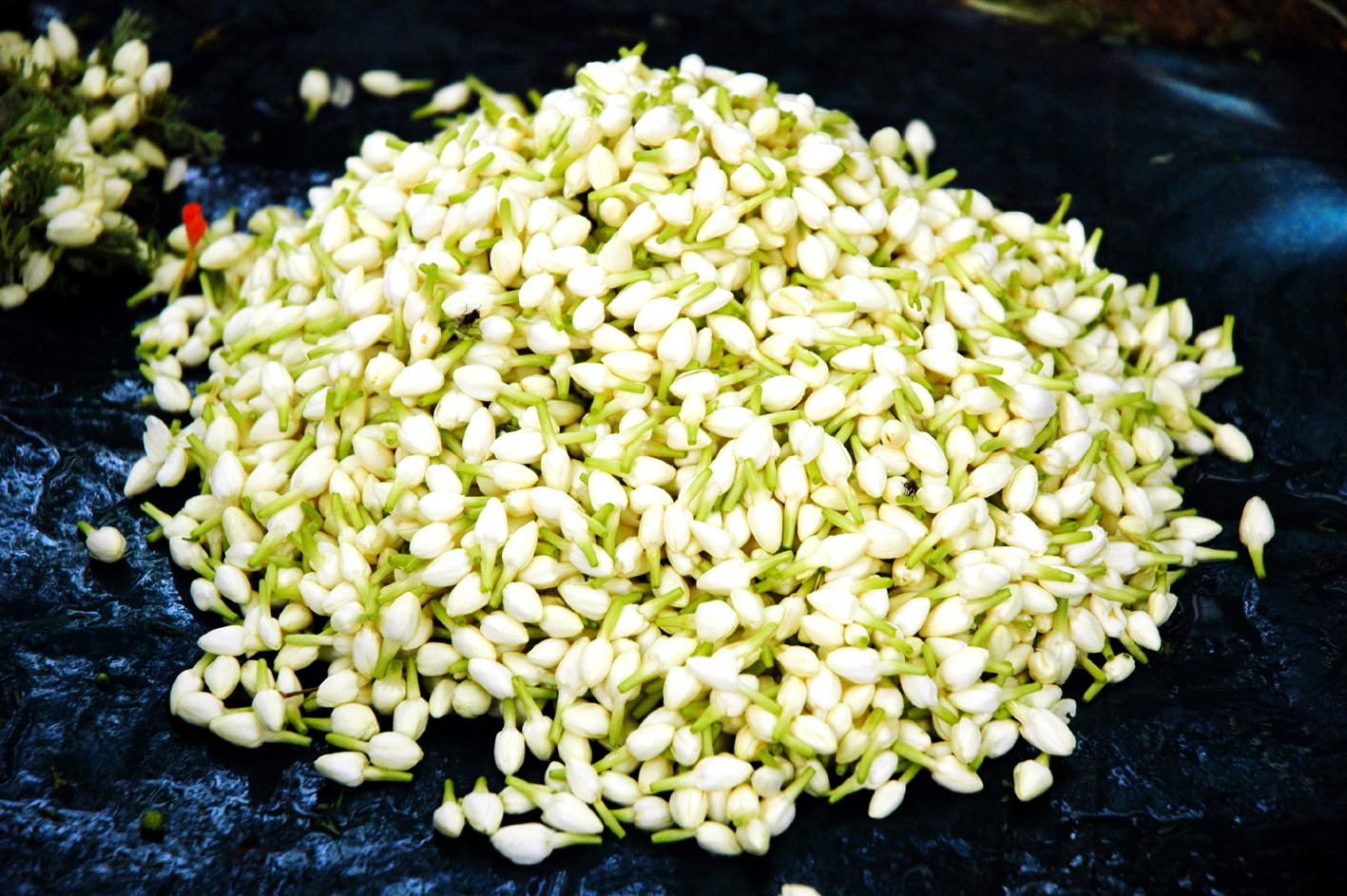
- Description: Malli from Madurai region
- Type: Agricultural
- Area: Madurai; Nilakkottai, Tamil Nadu
- Country: India
- Registered: 2012–13

Madurai Malli is a type of jasmine grown in the South central region of the Indian state of Tamil Nadu. It was declared as a Geographical indication in 2012-13 and was the first flower from the state to be accorded the status.

Madurai malli is a type of jasmine cultivated in the districts of (Mainly in Nilakkottai) Madurai, Dindigul, Virudhunagar, Theni and Sivagangai. The flowering plants have been cultivated since 300 BCE with references from Sangam literature and temple art. The flowers are known for its unique smell and fragrance.
