= Kashmir gold =

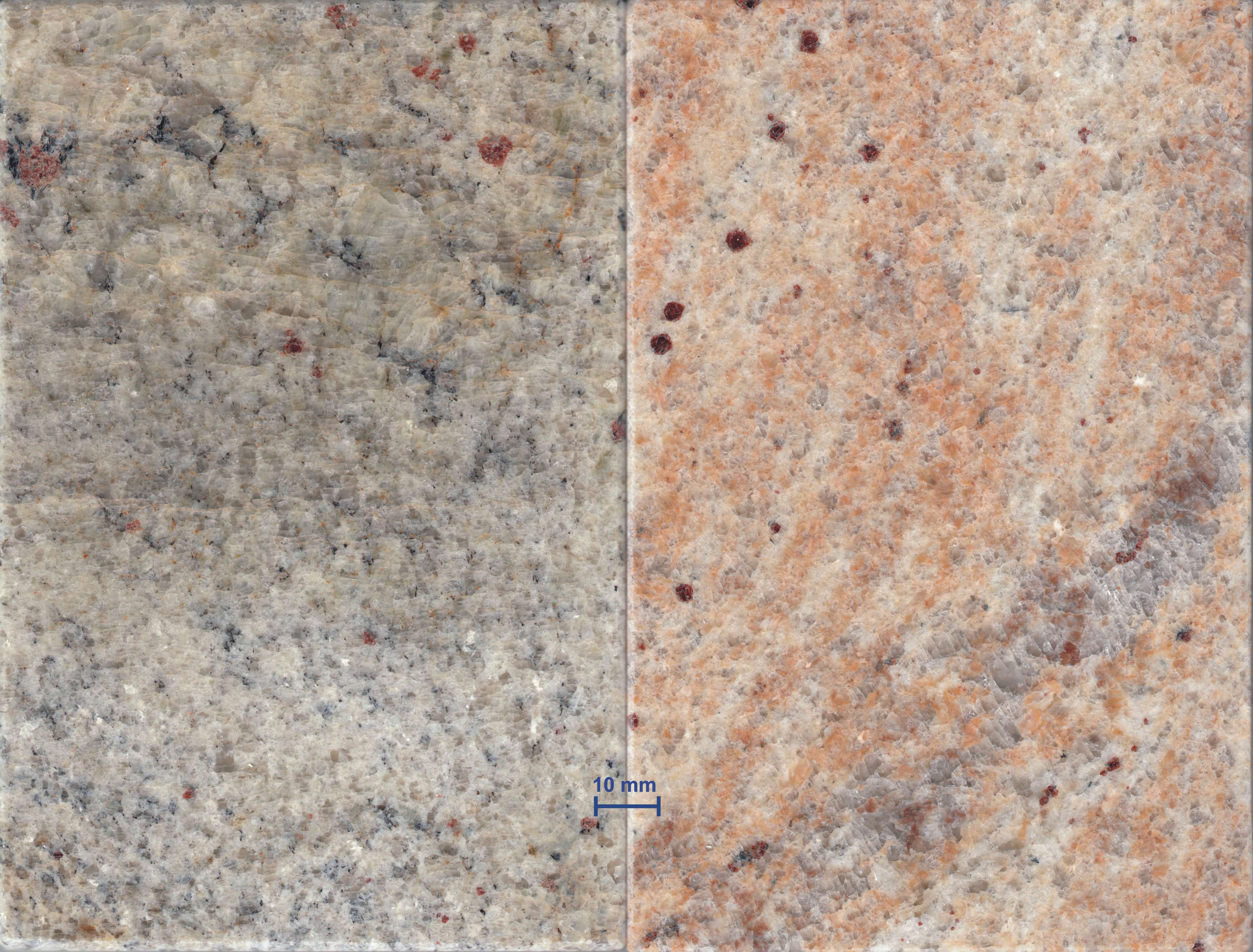
Dimension stones Kashmir White (left) and Kashmir Gold (right)

Kashmir White and Kashmir Gold are granulites found near Madurai, Tamil Nadu state, India. The two main dimension stone types are white and gold. The former is a light-coloured, in places slightly greenish rock with dark mica and red garnets, and the latter (gold) is a white, predominantly orange-yellow banded rock with a heterogeneous structure. It is dotted with darker veins, burgundy, red garnets and black mineral inclusions.

People often tout Kashmir White as a selling feature in expensive homes. The Kashmir White and Kashmir Gold dimension stones are sometimes used for paving ground surfaces. These decorative stones are also used as a countertop surface.

While large deposits of granites, granitoides, limestones and marbles are found in parts of India, neither natural stones other types are found in the Kashmir region. "Kashmir White" and "Kashmir Gold" are trade names.
