= Chennai Central – Bodinayakanur AC Superfast Express =

Superfast train in India

Chennai Central–Bodinayakanur Superfast Express (Via Madurai)
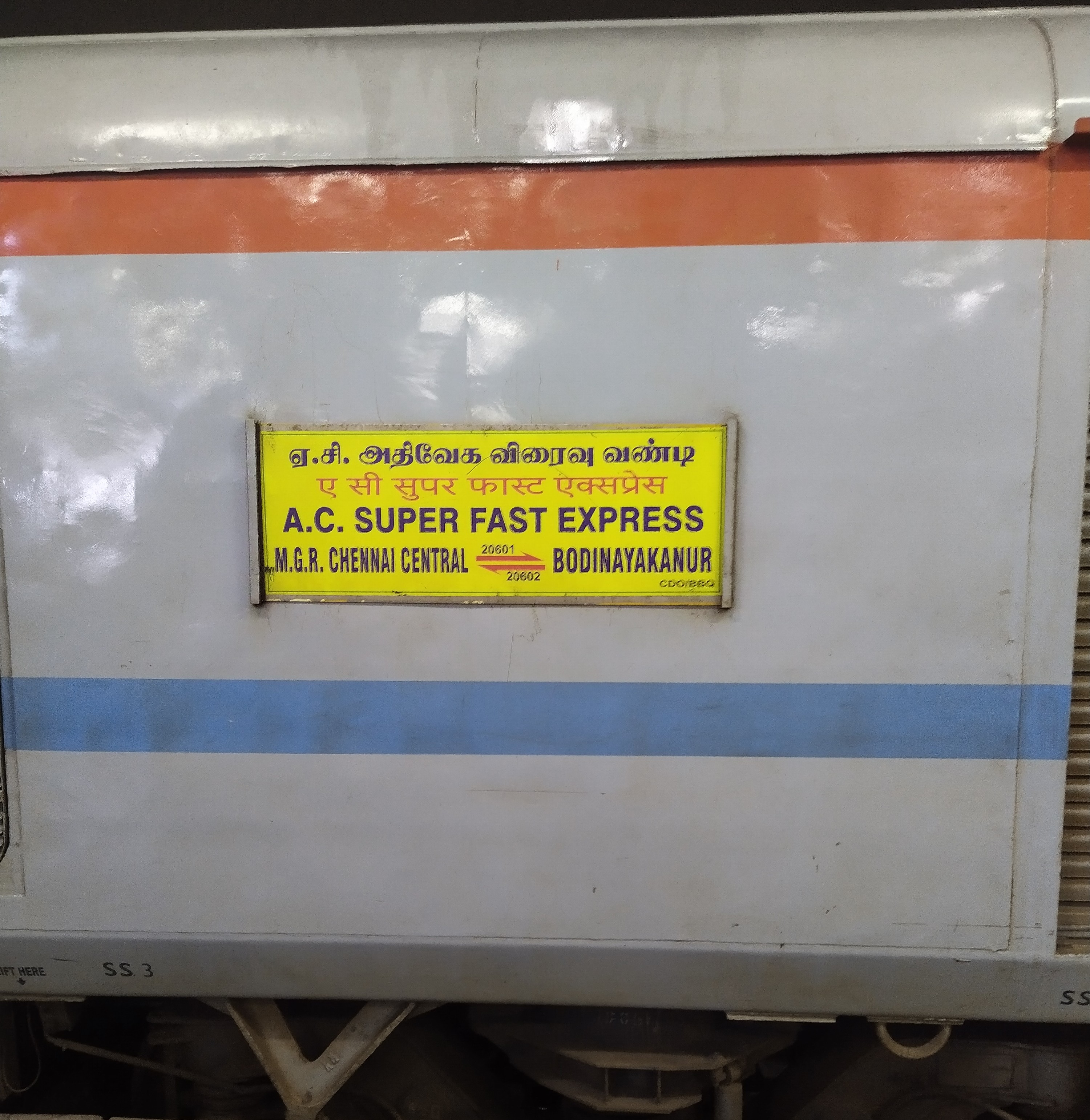
- AC super fast Express nameboard

Overview
- Service type: AC Superfast
- First service: 3 December 2012( As Chennai Central Madurai Junction Duronto AC Superfast Express & then Extended to Bodinaykkannur in 2023 after Cancelling in 2020)
- Last service: -
- Current operator: Southern Railways

Route
- Termini: MGR Chennai Central; Bodinayakkanur
- Stops: 8
- Distance travelled: 728 km (452 mi)
- Average journey time: 11:05 Hours
- Service frequency: Triweekly
- Train number: 20601 / 20602

On-board services
- Classes: AC First Class, AC Two Tier, AC Three Tier, Sleeper Class, General Unreserved.
- Seating arrangements: Yes
- Sleeping arrangements: Yes
- Auto-rack arrangements: Yes
- Catering facilities: No pantry car attached
- Observation facilities: Large windows
- Entertainment facilities: Charger Outlets
- Baggage facilities: Yes

Technical
- Rolling stock: LHB coach
- Track gauge: 1,676 mm (5 ft 6 in)
- Electrification: Yes
- Operating speed: 140 km/h (87 mph) maximum, 62 km/h (39 mph), including halts

The Chennai Central–Bodinayakanur Superfast Express is a Superfast express train connecting Chennai and Bodinayakanur which lies in Southern Railway zone of Tamil Nadu State in India. This train has been extended up to Bodinayakanur via Teni after the gauge conversion of this route was completed. From 15, June 2023 it made its first run from Bodinayakanur to Chennai.

== Overview ==
This train was inaugurated on 3 November 2017, as weekly frequency train service. It was Flagged off by Piyush Goyal (Minister of Railways) and Edappadi K. Palaniswami (Chief Minister of Tamil Nadu), For making less time and comfortable journey for Chennai and Madurai Commuters.

== History ==
This was one of the first two trains operated by Southern Railways with newly manufactured AC Three Tier Economy Coach. It was used to depart as a weekly service from Chennai at Fridays and from Madurai at Saturdays. But after Merging Madurai Duronto Express after Covid Lockdown, It had depart from Chennai on every Monday, Wednesday and Friday and from Madurai on every Tuesdays, Thursdays and Sundays. The Monday, Tuesday, Wednesday and Thursday Services were the service of Ex. Duronto Express and the Saturday Service of the train from madurai changed as sunday service. This train will be operated from weekly to tri-weekly with effect from 10 June 2020 from Chennai and 11 June 2020 from Madurai. There is no changes in timings but changes were made in departure days only in down direction (i.e. from Madurai to Chennai). Earlier it used to run as a fully air conditioned express, but after August 2021, 4 Sleeper Class coaches were attached. Initially, it ran only one day a week from Chennai Central – Madurai by sharing its rakes with Chennai Central – Madurai AC Duronto Express. After June 2020, Duronto Express was fully cancelled and it was made to run on the days that Duranto ran. Stoppages were given at Katpadi, Karur, and Dindigul. In return, it will leave from Madurai on every Tuesday, Thursday and Sunday. It was the first train to carry AC Three Tier Economy Coach in Southern Railway, though some trains carrying 3 Tier Economy Coach passes through Southern Railway Zone, do not belong to Southern Railway. From 25 February 2021, it will run with 1 more additional coach, i.e., AC Three Tier Economy which gives the count as 2. Prior to extending the service to Bodinayakkanur, all the AC three Tire Economy coaches were converted in to Unreserved Coaches there by it becomes the first AC express train to run with Unreserved Coaches.

== Coach composition ==
Till June 2020, 20601/02 MAS - MDU - MAS AC Express had the following Coach Position when it ran with ICF Coaches,

- 1 AC First Class
- 2 AC Two Tier
- 9 AC Three Tier
- 2 Power Cum Generator Cars

After receiving LHB rakes it had revised composition,

- 1 AC First Cum AC Two Tier
- 2 AC Two Tier
- 9 AC Three Tier
- 2 End On Generator Cars.

From September 2021 it had been attached with 4 Sleeper Classes and the name AC Express had been withdrawn, and was called as Central Express. Till 24rth February 2022, it had the following Coach composition,

20601/20602 Chennai Central - Madurai Junction
Central SF Express has,

- 1 AC First Cum AC Two Tier
- 2 AC Two Tier
- 9 AC Three Tier
- 4 Sleeper Class
- 2 End On Generator Cars

Till May 2023, it runs with the following Coach composition,

- 1 AC First Cum AC Two Tier
- 2 AC Two Tier
- 7 AC Three Tier
- 2 AC Three Tier Economy
- 1 Luggage Cum Disabled Coach
- 1 End on Generator Car.

After the extension to Bodinayakanur from 15 June, the coach position was changed as follows.

- 1 AC First Cum AC Two Tier
- 2 AC Two Tier
- 7 AC Three Tier
- 4 Sleeper Class
- 2 General Unreserved
- 1 Luggage Cum Disabled Coach
- 1 End on Generator Car.

== Routes ==
This train with the number of 20601/20602 passes through Katpadi Junction, Salem Junction, Karur Junction and Dindigul Junction, Madurai Junction, Andipatti, Usilampatti, Theni with the length of 728 km with an average speed of 62 km/h.

== Halts ==
When it ran as 22205/06 Chennai Central - Madurai AC SF Express it has its stoppages at,

- Katpadi
- Salem
- Karur
- Dindigul

After extension to Bodinayakanur from 15 June 2023, three new stoppages were introduced for 20601/02 Chennai - Bodinayakanur AC SF Express.

- Chennai Central
- Katpadi
- Salem
- Karur
- Dindigul
- Madurai
- Usilampatti
- Andipatti
- Teni
- Bodinayakanur

20602 Has an additional stoppage at Perambur, to avoid rushing in Central.

== Traction ==
The route is Fully electrified. It uses WAP 7 (Erode / Royapuram) until Bodinaykkannur, then is pushed by Wap 7 from Bodinaykkannur to Chennai.

== Demands ==
There are also demands to stop this train at Namakkal, Jolarpettai, Arakkonam, Thiruvallur and Perambur Railway stations.
