= Thiruparankundram =

Neighbourhood in Madurai district, Tamil Nadu, India

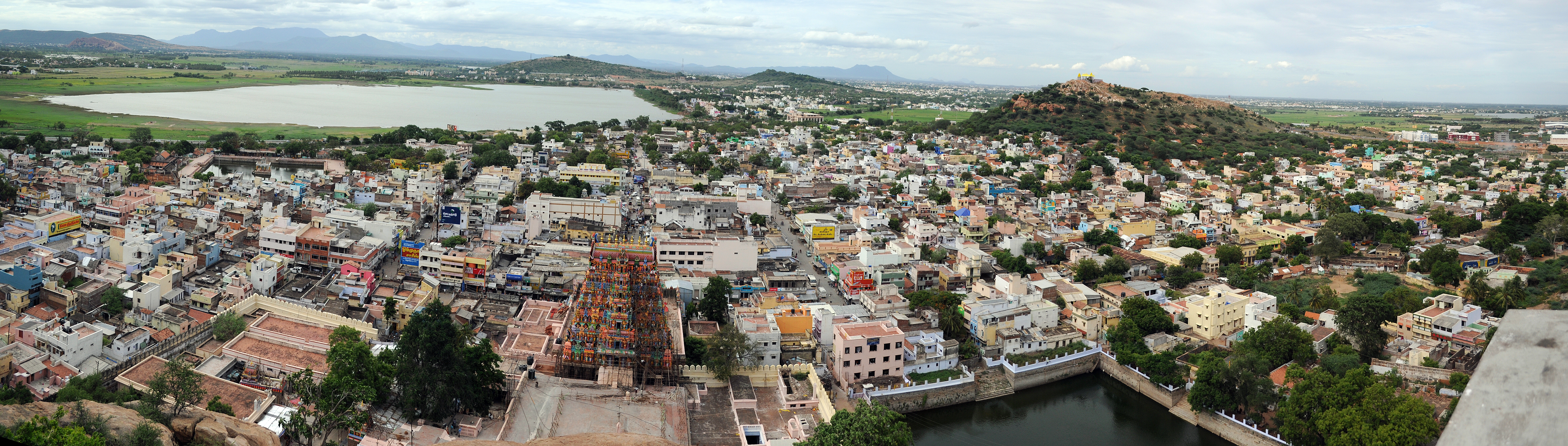
- View of the town with the Murugan temple in the foreground

- Thirupparankundram, Tamil Nadu Thiruparankundram (India)
- Coordinates: 9.882300°N 78.072000°E
- Country: India
- State: Tamil Nadu
- District: Madurai

Government
  - Type: Municipal Corporation
  - Body: Madurai Municipal Corporation

Area
  - Total: 12 km^{2} (4.6 sq mi)
- Elevation: 171 m (561 ft)

Population (2011)
  - Total: 48,810
  - Density: 4,100/km^{2} (11,000/sq mi)

Languages
  - Official: Tamil
- Time zone: UTC+5:30 (IST)
- Postal code: 625005
- Vehicle registration: TN 58

Thiruparankundram, also spelled Tiruparangundram, is a neighbourhood in Madurai in Tamil Nadu, India. Located about 7 km (4.3 mi) from the city center, it is located on the southwest part of the city. The town is situated abutting a huge monolithic rock hill that rises to a height of 1,048 ft (319 m).

It is home to the Subramaniya Swamy Temple, located on the foothill. There are numerous historic monuments, temples, a dargah, and Jain relics, some of which are protected as national monuments by the Indian government, on the hill.

As per the 2011 census, the town had a population of 48,810. It was incorporated as a separate municipality in 2011, and the first local body election for the same was held on 18 October 2011.

== History and significance ==
Thiruparankundram and its hill contains some of the earliest Hindu temples of Tamil Shaivite tradition in this region. The hill itself is sacred to the Hindus, and is known as Kandhamalai ("hill of Kandha"). The early cave temple at the northern foot of the hill was greatly expanded in stages over the years. Various shrines, Mandapas, a feeding house, a Vedic school, and centers for performance of traditional arts, were established from the 7th to 16th century CE by various Hindu dynasties, which later became part of the Thirupparamkunram Murugan temple complex. It is one of the Six Abodes of Murugan (Arupadaiveedu), a major pilgrimage site, and is among the most visited tourist places in Madurai.

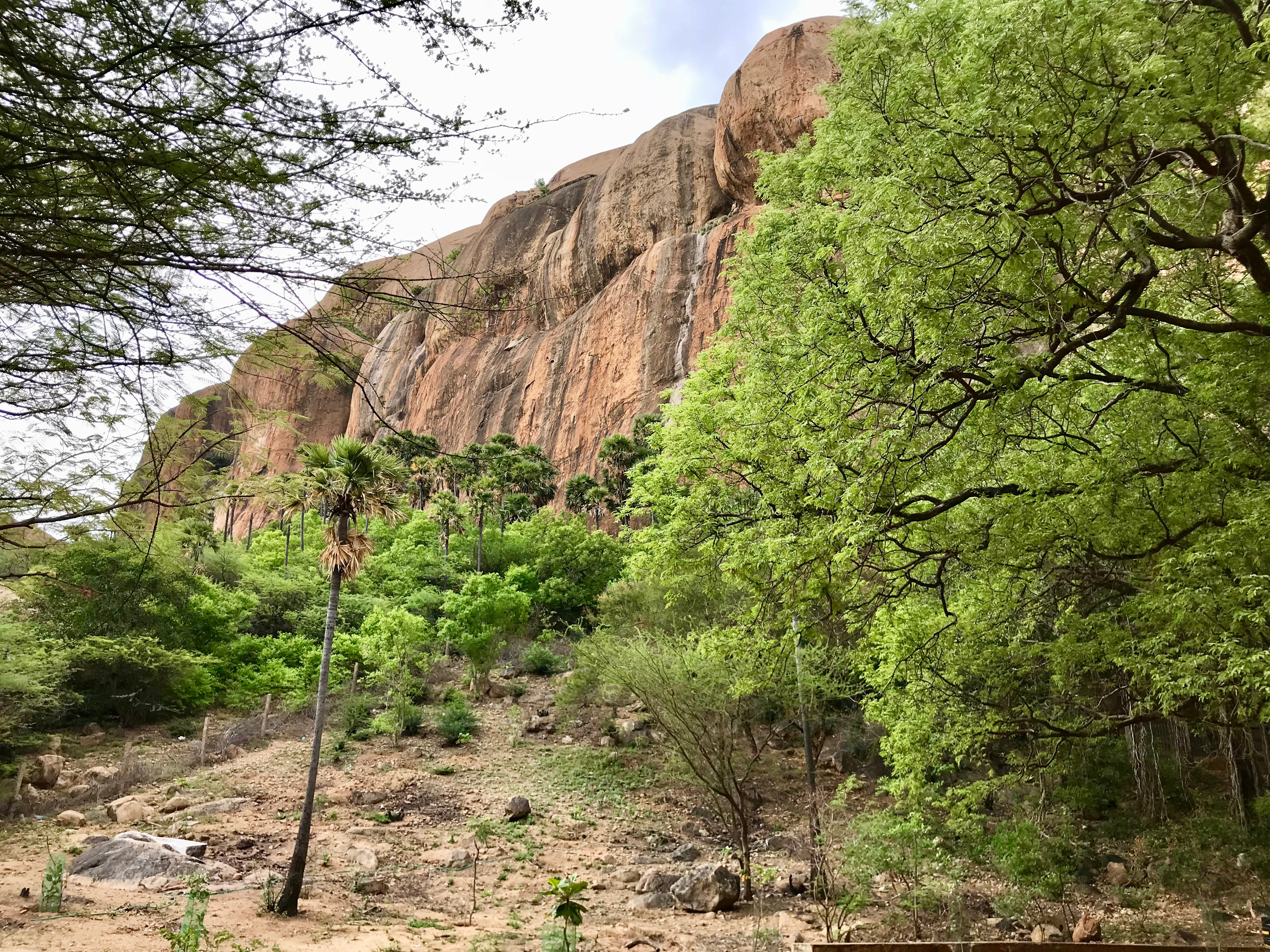
Southwestern side of the hillock

The western edge of the Thiruparankundram hill is home to ancient Jain beds with Tamil Brahmi inscriptions dated between 2nd century BCE and 2nd century CE. Uphill, there are several other Jain bas-reliefs of Parsvanatha and Mahavira along with inscriptions, dated to the 8th to 9th century CE. The traditional name of these Jain beds is "Pancha Pandava" beds, reflecting the local historic belief that the beds were one of the places visited by the five Pandava brothers of the Mahabharata. The southern side of the hill has a natural spring called Saraswati Tirtha and a rock-cut cave temple that was purportedly an ancient Jain temple converted into Shiva temple in the 7th century CE and expanded later in the 13th century CE. Hindu pilgrims circumambulate around the entire Thiruparankundram hill given the presence of the various religious monuments here.

A steady flight of stone stairs and walkway from the northern end, and another path from the southern end, lead to the top of the hill. The stone walkway is marked and has torana-like gateways and mandapas along the way. There are caverns that feature the images of Jain Tirthankaras along the way. On the western side where there is a rock-cut temple dedicated to Kasi Viswanathar, and dated to 7th century CE, which has a few inscriptions.

Sikandar Shah, the last ruler of the Madurai Sultanate, was killed in Thiruparankundram by Kumara Kampana of the Vijayanagara Empire in the 14th century CE. The followers of Shah, who was believed to be a Sufi mystic, built a memorial (dargah) for him atop the hill on the northeastern side. This grave memorial expanded into the Thiruparankundram Dargah later.

During the 18th century CE, the Murugan temple's mandapas and infrastructure were used as civic hospitals by the Hindus and an outpost of Madurai where soldiers gathered during times of war. Later, the European regiments aided by Hyder Ali and Yusuf Khan targeted the temple during the war between the British and the French, which later became part of the Madras Presidency. While the hill and the surrounding areas, which hosts several Hindu temples, Jain relics, and a dargah, has seen coexistence of various religious practices over the years, it been a subject of occasional dispute since the early 20th century. Adjudicating in a related dispute, in October 2025, the Madras High Court declared that the hill was a protected monument as declared by the Archaeological Survey of India in 1908 and 1923, and affirmed the ownership of the hill to the temple excluding the 0.33 acres (0.13 ha) of land on which the dargah is located. It also upheld a ruling that banned animal sacrifice at the site, while permitting the annual Santhanakoodu festival, and restricted prayers at the dargah to the occasions of Eid and Ramadan.

== Demographics ==
Religious census
Religion	Percent(%)
Hindu	91.79%
Christian	4.46%
Muslim	3.62%
Sikh	0.01%
Other	0.11%

According to 2011 census, Thiruparankundram had a population of 48,810 with a sex-ratio of 999 females for every 1,000 males, much above the national average of 929. A total of 4,736 were under the age of six, constituting 2,455 males and 2,281 females. Scheduled Castes and Scheduled Tribes accounted for 7.44% and 0.66% of the population, respectively. The average literacy of the town was 79.55%, compared to the national average of 72.99%. The town had a total of 12934 households. There were a total of 18,480 workers, comprising 109 cultivators, 386 main agricultural labourers, 516 in house hold industries, 15,926 other workers, 1,543 marginal workers, 47 marginal cultivators, 69 marginal agricultural labourers, 228 marginal workers in household industries and 1,199 other marginal workers.

As per the religious census of 2011, Thiruparankundram had 91.79% Hindus, 3.62% Muslims, 4.46% Christians, 0.01% Sikhs, and 0.11% following other religions.

== Transport ==
There is a bus stand with bus services connecting Thirupparangkundram with other parts of Madurai and adjacent villages. Tirupparankundram railway station, is located 6 km (3.7 mi) from Madurai junction, on the Madurai–Tirunelveli line. The nearest airport is Madurai Airport at Avaniyapuram which is 11 km (6.8 mi) from Thirupparankundram.

== Gallery ==
Sites in Thiruparankundram
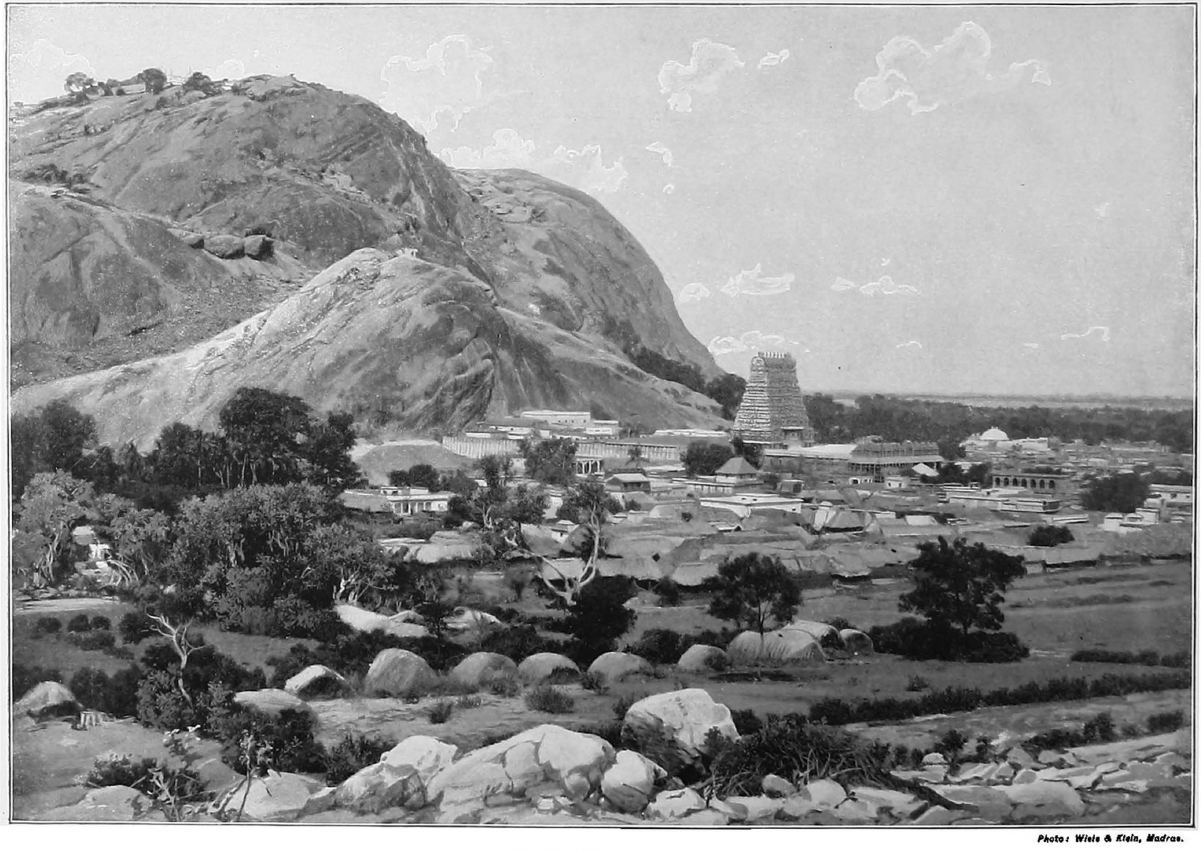
The Murugan temple complex at the northern foot of the hillock

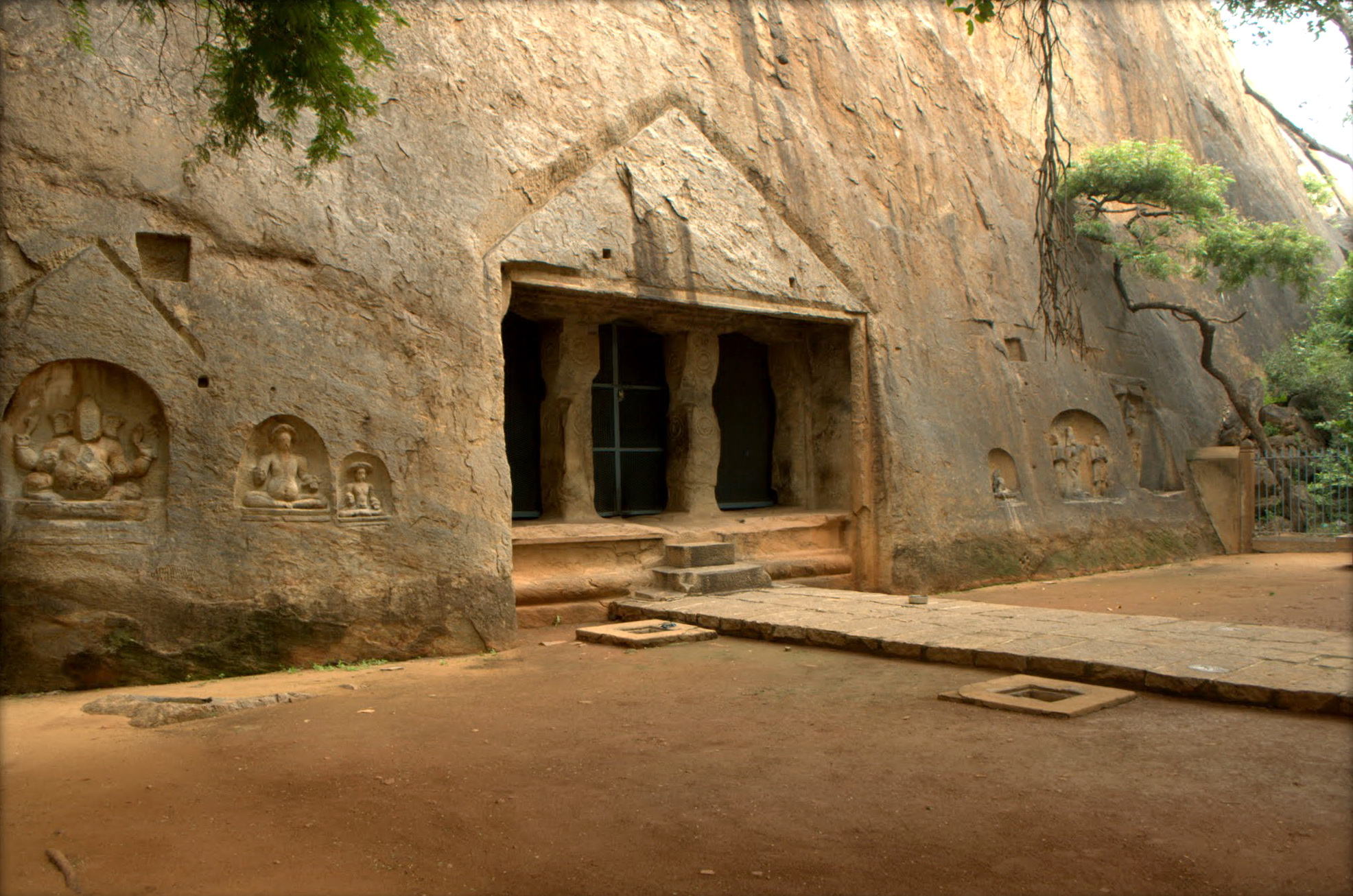
Umai Andar cave at the southern foot of the hillock

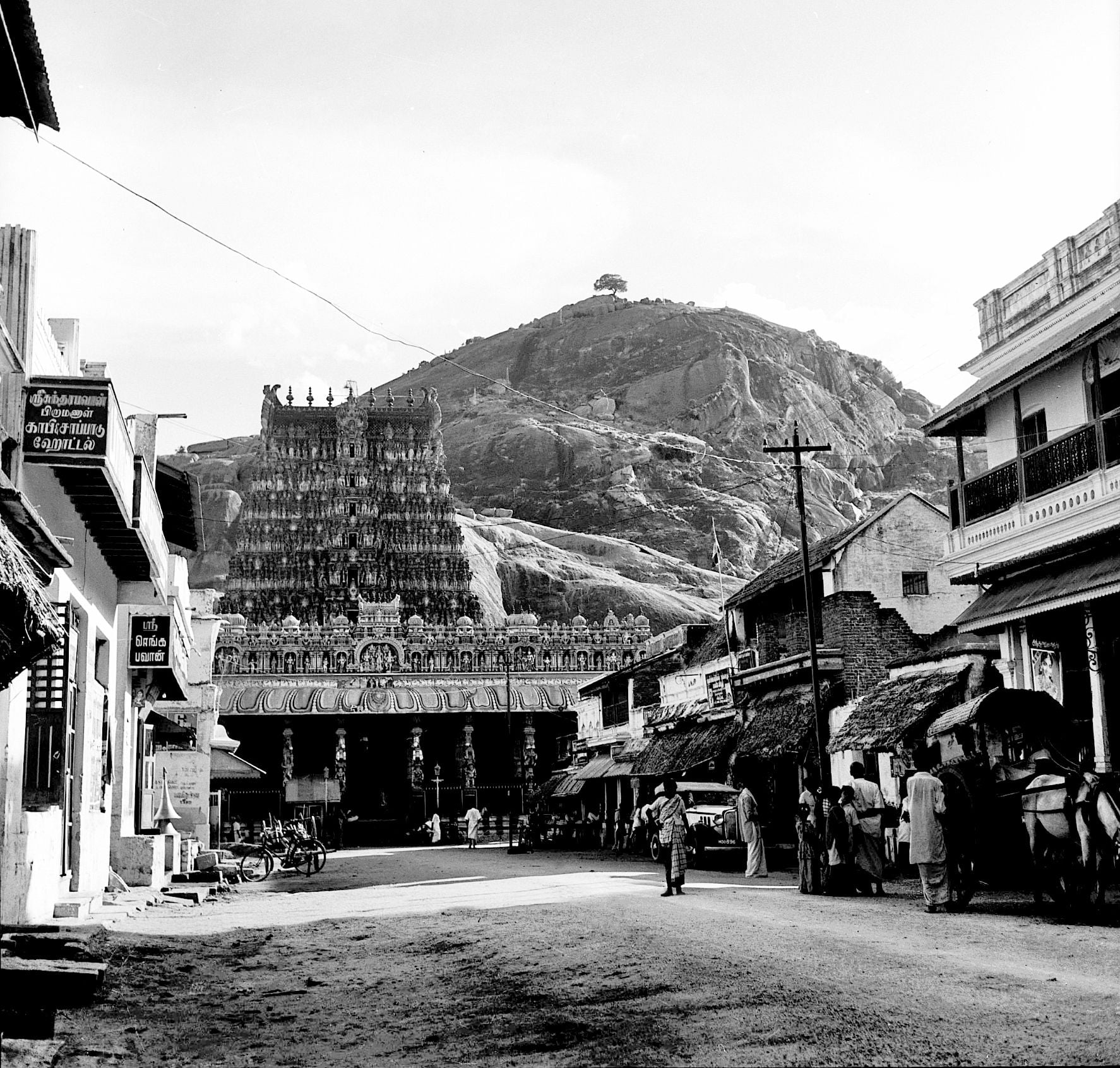
Sannathi street in 1955

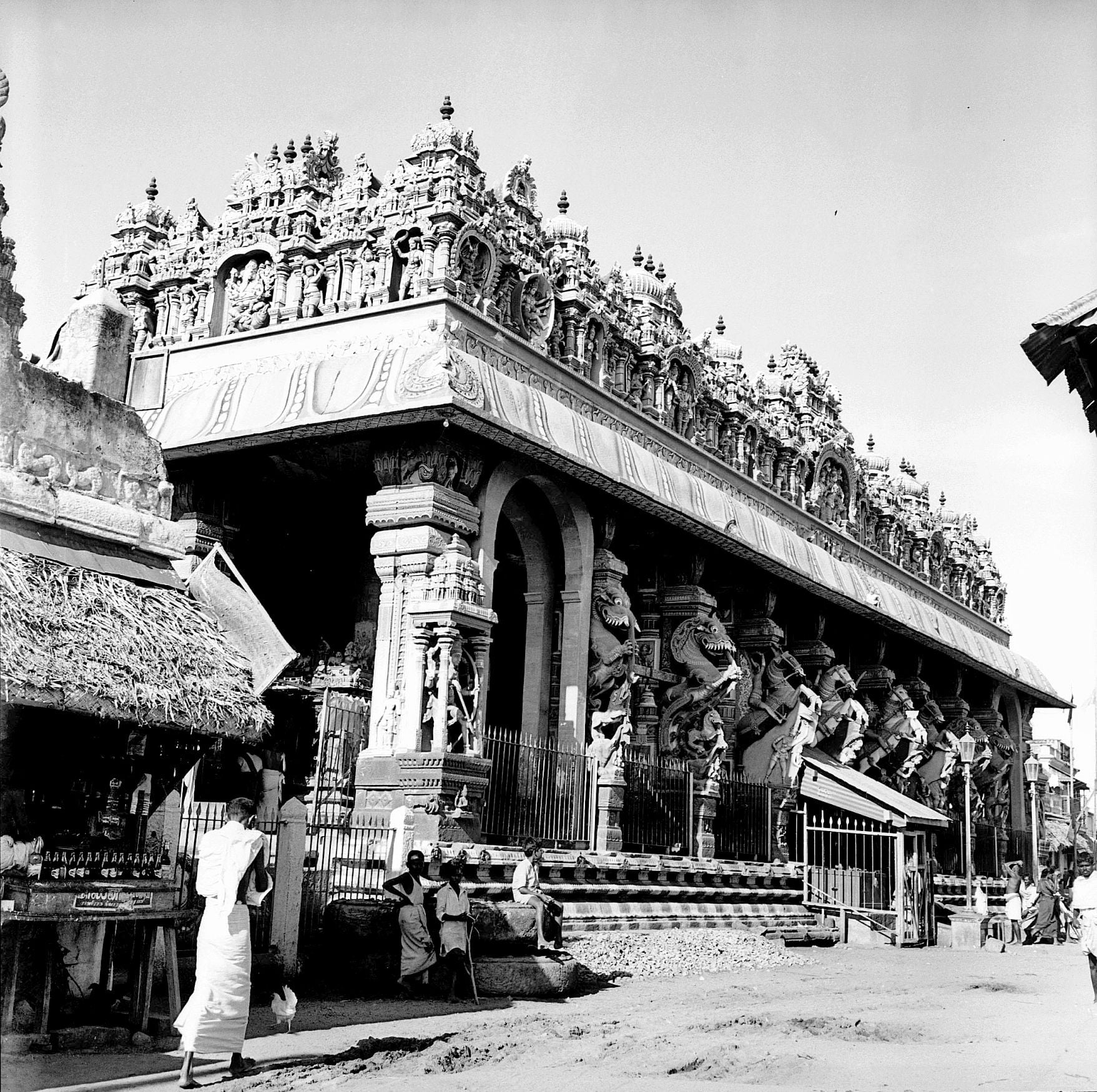
Periya Ratha street in 1955

== See also ==
- Muthupatti
- Thirupparankundram Murugan Temple
- Thiruparankundram Dargah
