= Pasumalai railway station =

Railway station in Pasumalai, Madurai, India

Pasumalai

General information
- Location: Pasumalai, Tamil Nadu, India
- Coordinates: 9.895109°N 78.086867°E
- Elevation: 129 metres (423 ft)
- System: Indian Railways station
- Owner: Indian Railways
- Operator: Southern Railway Zone

Other information
- Status: Inactive
- Station code: PSQ
- Zone(s): South
- Division(s): Madurai
- Website: http://www.indianrailways.gov.in

History
- Opened: 1876; 150 years ago
- Closed: 1981; 45 years ago during MG to BG conversion

Services
| Preceding station | Indian Railways | Following station |
|---|---|---|
| Madurai Junction towards | Southern Railway zone | Tirupparankundram towards |
Location
- Location within Tamil Nadu

Pasumalai railway station (station code: PSQ) was a minor railway halt located in Pasumalai, a suburb of Madurai, in the Indian state of Tamil Nadu. It formed part of the railway network operated by Southern Railway under the Madurai division.

The station is no longer operational and is considered a defunct railway halt.

== History ==
The station was situated on the Madurai–Virudhunagar–Tirunelveli railway line, which was opened as a metre-gauge line in 1876. The line later underwent conversion to broad gauge, which was completed in 1981.

Pasumalai railway station is listed in railway chainage records with the station code PSQ, positioned between Madurai Junction and Tirupparankundram stations. These records confirm the historical existence and location of the station within the railway network.

Following the gauge conversion of the Madurai–Virudhunagar section, several minor metre-gauge halts were discontinued. In that Pasumalai also one of those.

== Location ==
The station was located in the Pasumalai locality, approximately 4 km south of Madurai Junction. The area lies at the base of the Pasumalai hill and forms part of the urban agglomeration of Madurai.

== See also ==
- Madurai Junction
- Railway stations in Madurai
