= Tirumangalam railway station =

Railway station in Tamil Nadu, India

Tirumangalam
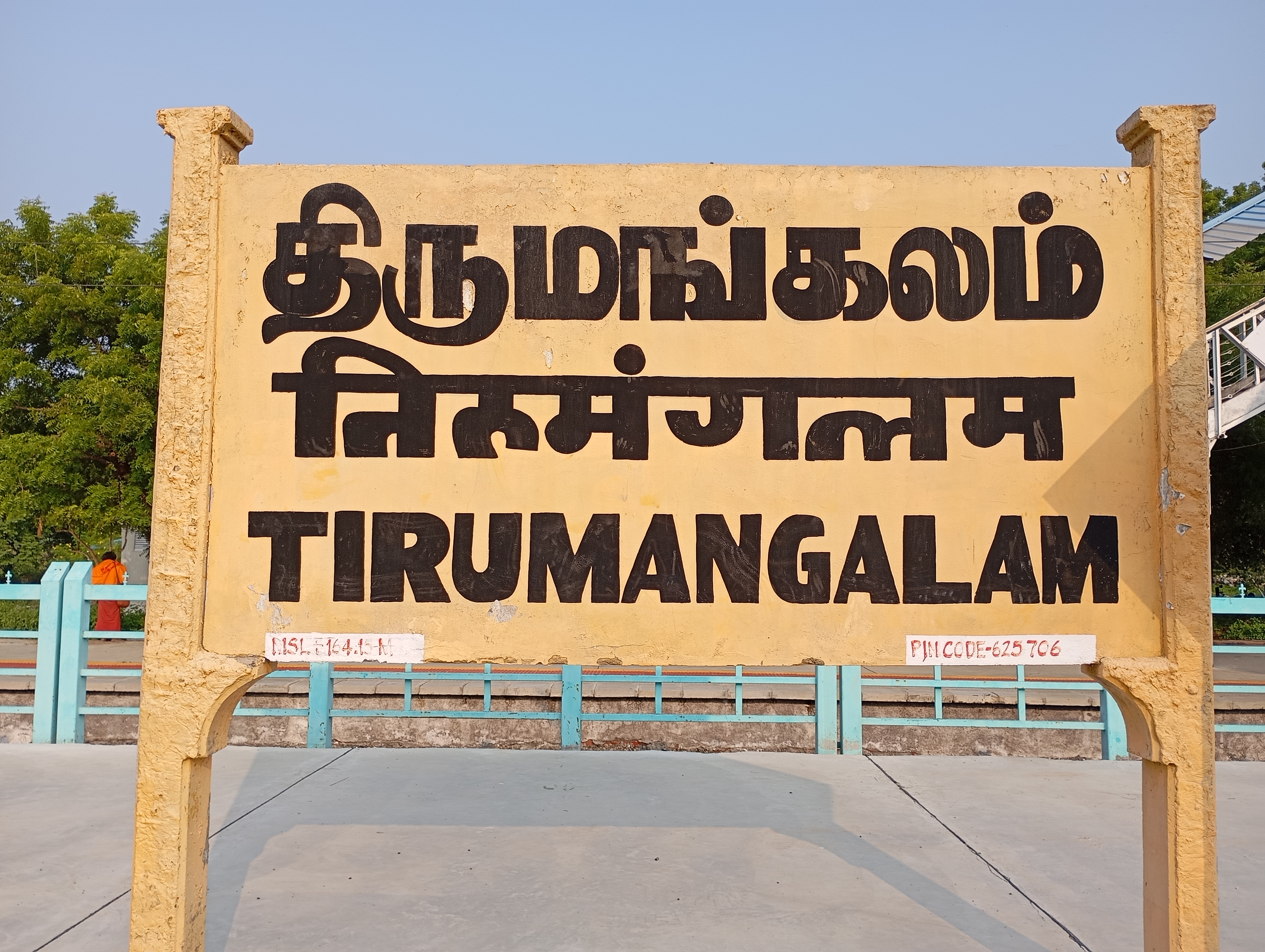
- Tirumangalam Railway Station

General information
- Location: Tirumangalam, Tamil Nadu, India
- Coordinates: 9.8231211°N 77.9879025°E
- Elevation: 129 metres (423 ft)
- System: Indian Railways station
- Owner: Indian Railways
- Operator: Southern Railway Zone
- Line: Active
- Platforms: 3
- Tracks: 3

Other information
- Status: Active
- Station code: TMQ
- Zone(s): South
- Division(s): Madurai
- Website: http://www.indianrailways.gov.in

History
- Opened: 1876; 150 years ago
- Rebuilt: 2022; 4 years ago During Double Line

Passengers
- 2024–25: 251,018 (per year); 1,349 (per day)

Services
Preceding station	Indian Railways	Following station
Tiruparankundram towards	Southern Railway zone	Kalligudi towards
Location
- Location within Tamil Nadu

Tirumangalam railway station, station code: TMQ (TAMIL: திருமங்கலம் தொடர்வண்டி நிலையம்), is an NSG–5 railway station which falls under the Southern Railway zone of the Indian Railways. It belongs to Madurai division. It is one of the oldest railway stations in Madurai Division. It serves the southern part of Madurai District.

It was constructed under British rule on 1 January 1876 as part of Madurai–Tirunelveli line.

== Performance and Earnings ==
For the FY 2023–24, the annual earnings of the station was ₹26,791,733 (US$280,000). For the same financial year, the annual reserved passenger count was 34,147 and the unreserved passenger was 176,050.

== The station ==
There are a total of 2 platforms and 3 tracks. The platforms are connected by foot overbridge. These platforms are built to accumulate 24 coaches express train. The platforms are equipped with modern facility like display board of arrival and departure of trains.

=== Station layout ===
G	Street level	Exit/Entrance & ticket counter
P1	FOB, Side platform | Doors will open on the left
P1	Platform 1	Towards → Madurai Junction; Next Station: Tiruparankundram
P1	FOB, Island platform | P2 Doors will open on the right
P1	Platform 2	Towards ← Virudhunagar Junction; Next Station: Kalligudi
P1		↔ Loop Line

=== Infrastructure ===
In early 2023, the station underwent substantial operational suspensions to finish the doubling of the Madurai – Thirumangalam section and complete non-interlocking yard changes.

The completion of the ₹23-crore road overbridge crossing the railway line which is closer to the railway station — crucial for bypassing the busy level crossing gate—received coverage outlining its impact on daily trains and thousands of local families.

== Train Services ==
The station currently handles approximately 22 daily scheduled halting train departures. These encompass a mix of express, superfast, passenger, and unreserved train categories, linking the town to primary commercial terminals like Chennai Egmore, Bengaluru, Madurai Junction, Tuticorin, Coimbatore Junction, Guruvayur, and Kollam Junction.

Train Name	Arrival	Departure
Towards Madurai Junction
16730 | Punalur - Madurai Jn Express	01:58	2:00
16846 | Sengottai - Erode Jn Express (UnReserved)	09:03	09:05
16848 | Sengottai - Mayiladuthurai Jn Express (UnReserved)	09:33	09:35
16321 | Nagercoil Jn - Coimbatore Jn Express	11:38	11:40
56772 | Sengottai - Madurai Jn UnReserved Passenger	14:50	14:52
16732 | Tiruchendur - Palakkad Jn Express	15:53	15:55
16328 | Guruvayur - Madurai Jn Express	18:21	18:23
20692 | Nagercoil - Tambaram Antyodaya Express	19:03	19:05
16235 | Tuticorin - Mysuru Express	19:32	19:35
20636 | Kollam - Egmore Ananthapuri Express	21:18	21:20
12694 | Tuticorin - Egmore Pearl City SF Express	23:08	23:10
Towards Virudhunagar Junction
12693 | Egmore - Tuticorin Pearl City SF Express	03:07	03:08
20635 | Egmore - Kollam Ananthapuri Express	03:37	03:38
56771 | Madurai Jn - Sengottai UnReserved Passenger	07:47	07:48
16236 | Mysuru - Tuticorin Express	07:55	07:56
20691 | Tambaram - Nagercoil Antyodaya Express	08:37	08:38
16731 | Palakkad Jn - Tiruchendur Express	11:24	11:25
16327 | Madurai Jn - Guruvayur Express	11:54	11:55
16322 | Coimbatore Jn - Nagercoil Jn Express	14:51	14:52
16847 | Mayiladuthurai Jn - Sengottai Express (UnReserved)	15:35	15:36
16845 | Erode Jn - Sengottai Express (UnReserved)	18:19	18:20
16729 | Madurai Jn - Punalur Express	23:36	23:37

== See also ==
- Madurai Junction
- Railway stations in Madurai
