= Rameswaram–Tirupathi Meenakshi Express =

Train in India

Rameswaram - Tirupathi Meenakshi Express
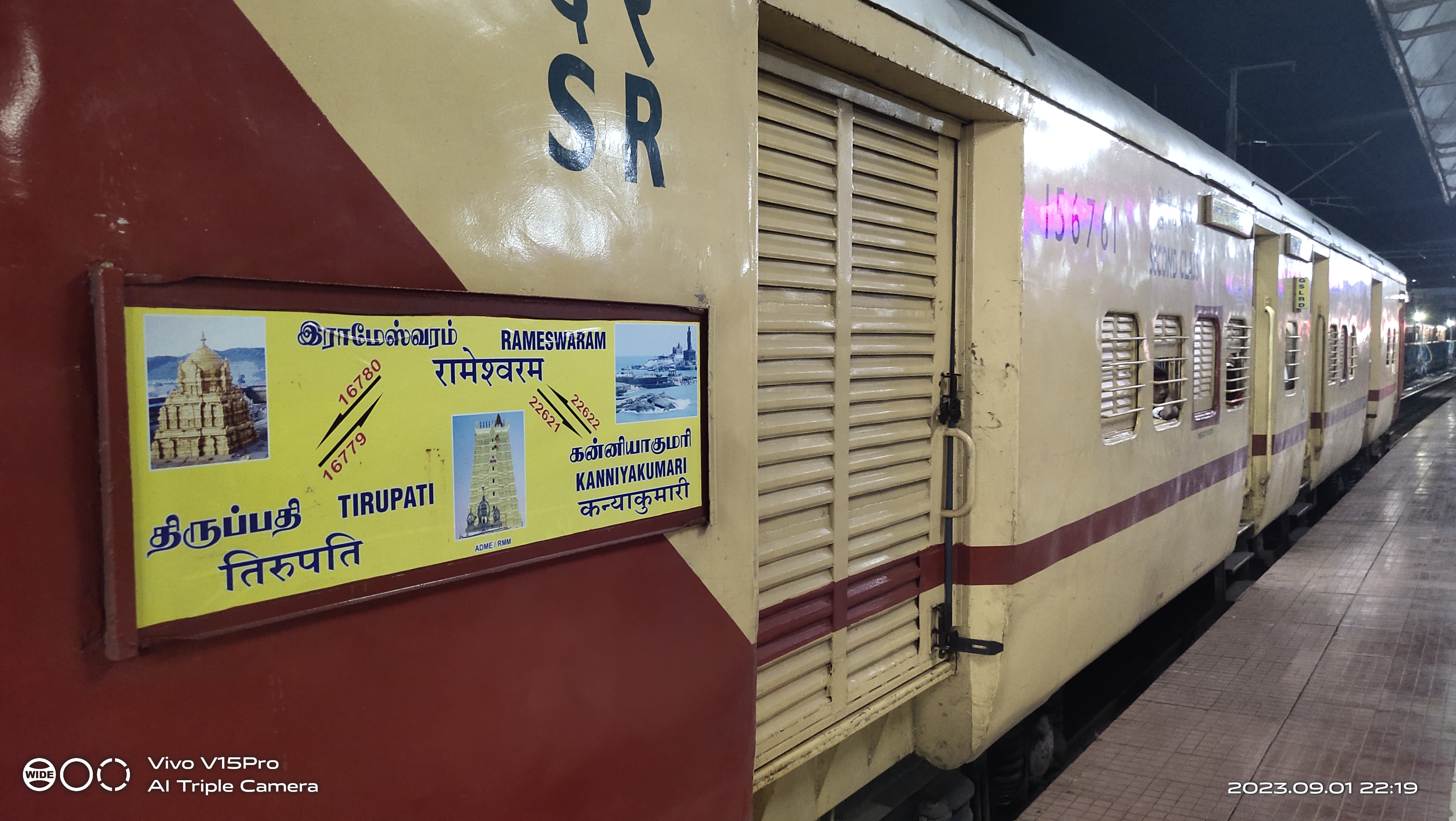
- Rameswaram - Tirupathi Meenakshi Express at Tiruchchirappalli Junction

Overview
- Service type: Express
- Locale: Tamil Nadu and Andhra Pradesh
- First service: 1 April 2011; 15 years ago
- Current operator: Indian Railways
- Ridership: Mail/Express

Route
- Termini: Rameswaram; Tirupati Main
- Stops: 17
- Distance travelled: 808 km (502 mi)
- Average journey time: 16 Hrs 00 Min
- Service frequency: Four days a week
- Train number: 16779/16780

On-board services
- Classes: 3 Third AC; 8 Sleeper; 4 Unreserved; 1 SLRD; 1 EOG
- Disabled access: Disabled access
- Seating arrangements: Yes
- Sleeping arrangements: Yes
- Auto-rack arrangements: No
- Catering facilities: E-Catering
- Observation facilities: Large windows
- Baggage facilities: Over Head Rakes

Technical
- Rolling stock: RMM - MDU : WDG-3A, WDM-3A Locomotive from Diesel Loco Shed, Golden Rock previously; RMM - TPTY : WAP-4 Locomotive from Electric Loco Shed, Arakkonam, Erode Tirupati Main
- Track gauge: 1,676 mm (5 ft 6 in)
- Electrification: 25 kV AC, 50 Hz ( High Voltage Traction)
- Operating speed: 50 km/h (31 mph) average with halts
- Average length: 18 Coaches
- Track owner: Indian Railways
- Timetable number: 21/21A
- Rake maintenance: Rameswaram
- Rake sharing: Rameswaram-Kanniyakumari Superfast Express
Route map
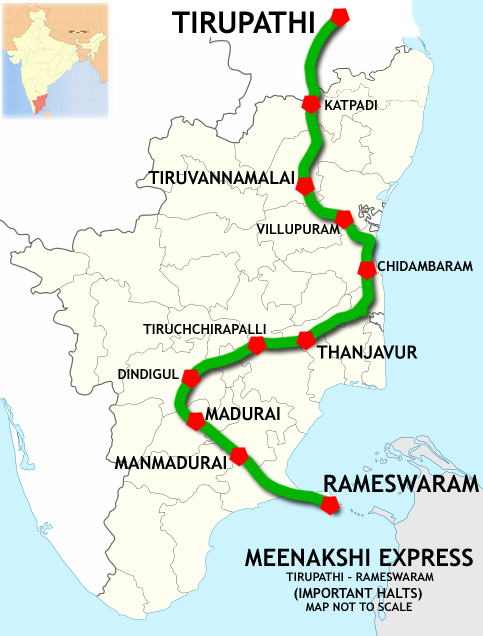

Rameswaram–Tirupati Express connects Holy Island Rameswaram in Tamil Nadu with Holy City Tirupati in Andhra Pradesh.

This train covers a total distance of about 808 kilometres (502 mi). This train is also called as Meenakshi Express as it travels via Temple City of Madurai. The train goes via Madurai, Tiruchchirappalli, Thanjavur, Kumbakonam, Viluppuram, Tiruvannamalai, Vellore, Katpadi and Pakala. It previously runs with refurbished Utkrist coaches and now with LHB coaches .

== Traction ==
It runs 4 days in a week from Tirupati. It starts on Monday, Wednesday, Friday, Saturday and from Rameswaram it starts from Sunday, Tuesday, Thursday and Friday.

== Service ==
16779 / 16780 runs at average speed of 54 km/h and covers 808 km. It connects some major stations like Ramanathapuram, Madurai, Dindigul, Tiruchchirappalli, Thanjavur, Mayiladuthurai, Villupuram, Tiruvannamalai, Vellore, Katpadi and Pakala.

Railways has also organised a divine tour to these pilgrimage destinations.

== Rake ==
This train shares rakes with 22621/22622 Rameswaram–Kanniyakumari Superfast Express

Loco	1	2	3	4	5	6	7	8	9	10	11	12	13	14	15	16	17	18
	EOG	UR	UR	B1	B2	B3	BE1	S1	S2	S3	S4	S5	S6	S7	S8	UR	UR	SLRD

== Schedule ==
16779 - Rameswaram → Tirupathi ~ Meenakshi Express
Station/Junction Name	Station Code	Arrival	Departure	Day
Tirupathi	SOURCE	TPTY	11:55	1
Pakala Junction	PAK	12:28	12:30	1
Katpadi Junction	KPD	13:50	13:55	1
Vellore Cantonment	VLR	14:18	14:20	1
Tiruvannamalai	TNM	15:38	15:40	1
Villupuram Junction	VM	17:05	17:10	1
Thirupathiripuliyur	TDPR	17:59	18:00	1
Chidambaram	CDM	19:14	19:16	1
Sirkazhi	SY	19:33	19:34	1
Mayiladuthurai Junction	MV	20:18	20:20	1
Kumbakonam	KMU	20:46	20:48	1
Thanjavur Junction	TJ	22:16	22:18	1
Tiruchchirappalli Junction	TPJ	23:25	23:30	1
Dindigul Junction	DG	00:30	00:35	2
Madurai Junction	MDU	01:30	01:35	2
Manamadurai	MNM	02:13	02:15	2
Paramakkudi	PMK	02:35	02:37	2
Ramanathapuram	RMD	03:03	03:05	2
Mandapam	MMM	03:33	03:35	2
Rameswaram	RMM	04:35	DEST	2
16780 - Rameswaram → Tirupathi ~ Meenakshi Express
Rameswaram	RMM	SOURCE	16:55	1
Mandapam	MMM	17:13	17:15	1
Ramanathapuram	RMD	17:43	17:45	1
Paramakkudi	PMK	18:13	18:15	1
Manamadurai	MNM	18:40	18:45	1
Madurai Junction	MDU	19:45	19:50	1
Kodaikkanal Road	KQN	20:23	20:25	1
Dindigul Junction	DG	20:55	21:00	1
Tiruchchirappalli Junction	TPJ	22:10	22:25	1
Thanjavur Junction	TJ	23:05	23:07	1
Kumbakonam	KMU	23:40	23:42	1
Mayiladuthurai Junction	MV	00:23	00:25	2
Sirkazhi	SY	00:47	00:48	2
Chidambaram	CDM	00:58	01:00	2
Thirupathiripuliyur	TDPR	01:49	01:50	1
Villupuram Junction	VM	03:05	03:10	2
Tiruvannamalai	TNM	04:43	04:45	2
Vellore Cantonment	VLR	06:28	06:30	2
Katpadi Junction	KPD	07:40	07:45	2
Pakala Junction	PAK	08:58	09:00	2
Tirupathi	TPTY	10:10	DEST	2

== See also ==
- Boat Mail Express
- Sethu Superfast Express
- Rameswaram-Kanniyakumari Superfast Express
- Chendur Superfast Express
- Mannai Express
- Cholan Superfast Express
- Pearl City (Muthunagar) Superfast Express
- Nellai Superfast Express
- Pandian Superfast Express
- Pallavan Superfast Express
- Ananthapuri Express
- Tambaram-Nagercoil Antyodaya Express
- Kanniyakumari Superfast Express
- Vaigai Superfast Express
- Pothigai Superfast Express
