= Teni Junction railway station =

Railway station in Tamil Nadu, India

Teni
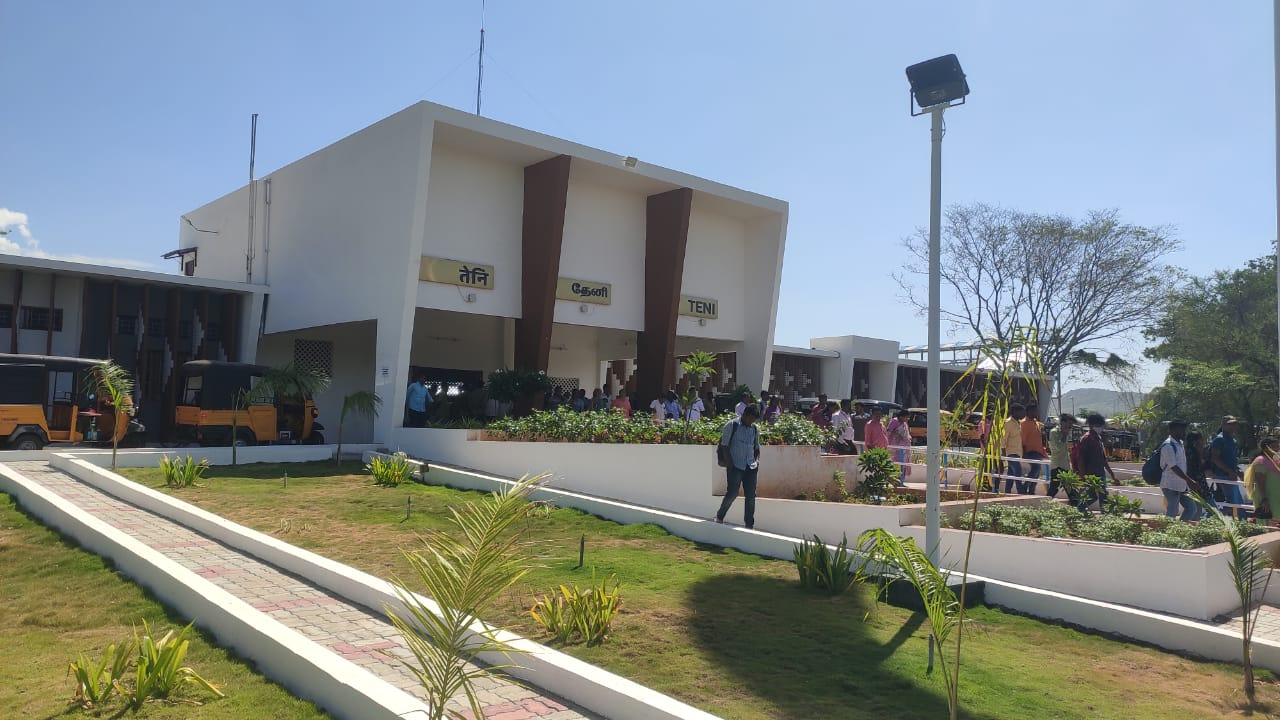

General information
- Other names: Teni railway station
- Location: Railway Station Rd, Teni Allinagaram, Teni, Teni dt., Tamil Nadu; Madurai Division; India
- Elevation: 348 metres (1,142 ft)
- System: Indian Railways station
- Owner: Indian Railways
- Operator: Southern Railway
- Line: Madurai–Bodinayakkanur branch line
- Platforms: 2
- Tracks: 3
- Train operators: Indian Railways

Construction
- Structure type: Standard (on-ground station)
- Parking: Yes

Other information
- Status: Operational
- Station code: TENI
- Zone(s): Southern Railway
- Division(s): Madurai
- IATA code: TENI
- Fare zone: Southern Railway

History
- Opened: 1909
- Opening: 1909
- Closed: 1915–1928; 1942–1954; 2011–2022
- Rebuilt: 1 April 2022
- Former names: Teni Railway Station

Passengers
- 2022–23: 80,358 per year 220 per day
Location

Teni (station code:TENI) is an NSG–5 category Indian railway station in Madurai railway division of Southern Railway zone. It serves Theni, located in Theni district of the Indian state of Tamil Nadu.

It is a railway station on Madurai–Bodinayakkanur branch line, serving the town of Theni in Tamil Nadu state, India. It was closed in 31st of december 2010 as the line was under gauge conversion, from metre to broad gauge until 30 March 2022. From 31 March 2022 once again this station became operational after CRS inspection was successfully conducted between Andipatti to Theni railway station. It is one of the railway stations in Southern Railway zone. It falls under Madurai Division of the Indian Railways. It is one of the rare railway stations in India where all the historic Indian gauges 610mm, 762mm, 1000mm are used. Currently it has been converted to 1676mm broad gauge. Now only one unreserved train is being operated daily between Madurai junction and Theni railway station.

== Lines ==
This is a railway station of Madurai–Bodinayakanur line. It has been converted into broad gauge and passenger trains are being operated in this route. A new line is proposed to constructed from Dindigul Junction to Kumily via Batlagundu, Periyakulam, Teni, Cumbum.

== History ==
Theni railway station was inaugurated on 1909 as a light railway line (610mm), later that line was closed due to World War I in 1915. Later Teni railway station was inaugurated together with the Madurai–Bodinayakanur 90 km branch line on 20 November 1928 as narrow-gauge railway (762mm) by the Madras Provincial revenue member Norman Marjoribanks. Later in 1942, during the Second World War, the line was closed and the tracks were removed. After India's Independence, between 1953 and 1954, the track was restored as a metre-gauge railway.

The Madurai–Bodinayakanur line was sanctioned for gauge conversion, from metre-gauge (1,000 mm (3 ft 3 ^{3}/_{8} in)) to broad gauge (1,676 mm (5 ft 6 in)). It was closed on 1 January 2011, expecting to reopen it by 2012, but due to lack of funds, the project advanced at very slow pace. Finally, on 23 January 2020, the first stretch between Madurai Junction and Usilampatti (37 km) was inaugurated, after passing the inspection of the Commission of Railway Safety. The remaining 53 km Usilampatti–Bodinayakanur section is expected to reopen in April 2020. In December 2020 Usilambatti to Andipatti section of the railway line got materialised and was inaugurated, after passing the inspection of the Commission of Railway Safety.

During 1909 a narrow-gauge railway line existed between Dindigul Junction to Kumily Lower Camp via Sempatti, Batlagundu, Periyakulam, Theni, Cumbum. It had several branch lines in-between Periyakulam to Kodaikanal foothills and theni to Kottagudi. Near Kottagudi, the Kundala Valley Railway line's Topslip railway station is present at a distance of 5 km. This railway line had been closed due to World War I as well as due to poor patronage.

The current railway line alignment between theni railway station to Bodinayakkanur railway station follows the same alignment of the old railway line which existed during 1910 between Theni to Kottagudi branch railway line. The new railway line is constructed from Theni to Madurai Junction later in 1928 as Madurai-Bodinayakanur Branch Line, now this line is exist and is currently under Gauge conversion from metre gauge to broad gauge. The old railway line from Kodaikanal Road to Kumuli is dismantled due to World War I as well as poor patronage.

== Performance and earnings ==
For the FY 2022–23, the annual earnings of the station was ₹3,195,095 (US$33,000) and daily earnings was ₹8,754 (US$91). For the same financial year, the annual passenger count was 80,358 and daily count was 220. While, the footfall per day was recorded as 459.
