= Chennai–Madurai AC Duronto Express =

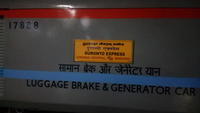

Overview
- Service type: AC Duronto
- Status: Permanently withdrawn from service
- Locale: Tamil Nadu
- First service: 15 December 2012; 13 years ago
- Last service: March 2020; 6 years ago
- Current operator: Southern Railway zone

Route
- Termini: Chennai Central (MAS); Bodinayakkanur (BDNK)
- Stops: 11 (Note: Halt.)
- Distance travelled: 648 km (403 mi)
- Average journey time: 10hrs 20 minutes
- Service frequency: 5days in a week
- Train number: 20601/20602

On-board services
- Classes: First AC, Second AC, Third AC, Sleeper, Unreserved
- Observation facilities: Large Windows

Technical
- Track gauge: 1,676 mm (5 ft 6 in)
- Electrification: Yes
- Operating speed: 71 km/h (45 mph)

Chennai Madurai Duronto Express was a Duronto Express belonging to Indian Railways which was operated fully Air-Conditioned Superfast Bi-weekly train connecting Chennai and Madurai via Salem in Southern Railway zone. This train was cancelled with effect from 10 June 2020.

This Duronto Express now converted to a Chennai Central–Bodinayakkanur Superfast Express.(Train No: 20601/20602) It runs five days a week.

== Background ==
The inflow to the State Capital from Teni and its neighboring districts and the heavy rail traffic on the Tambaram-Villupuram-Madurai section is the prime reason behind operating the train from Chennai Central. Therefore, it takes a longer route via Salem, Namakkal, Karur, Dindigul, Madurai. The train makes 9 commercial halts at Katpadi,Salem, Namakkal, Karur, Dindigul, Madurai, Usilampatti, Andipatti and Teni across the Chennai-Bodinayakkanur line and 1 minute - one way halt at Perambur. It skips major junctions like Arakkonam Junction (AJJ) and Jolarpettai Junction (JTJ) in an aggressive mode. It is now running with LHB rakes (Linke Hoffman Busch) from 26 June 2018 and is maintained at Chennai Central. Now this train has high demand after Pandian Express to Madurai.

== Coach composition ==
The train consists of one 1 AC First/Executive Class (1A), 1 AC Two-tier (2A), 6AC Three-Tier (3A) 4 Sleeper (SL) and 4 General Including 1 EOG & 1 SLRD

== Gallery ==
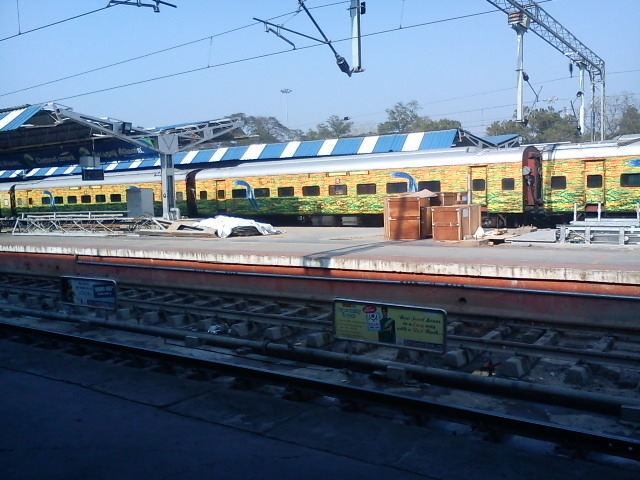
Chennai Central - Madurai Duronto arrived Madurai Junction

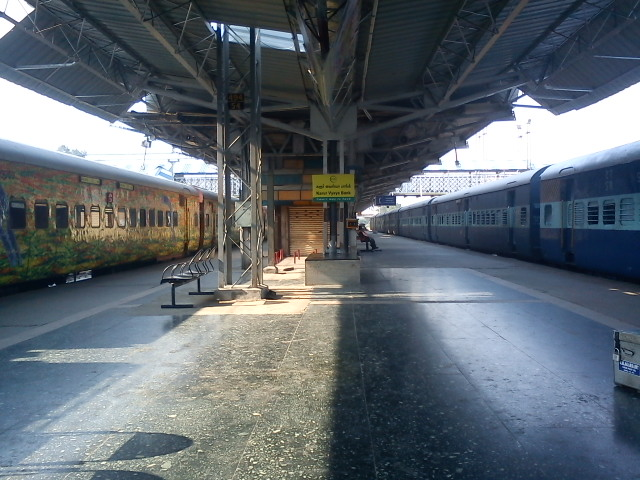
Duronto halted Parallel with Punalur-Madurai fast passenger

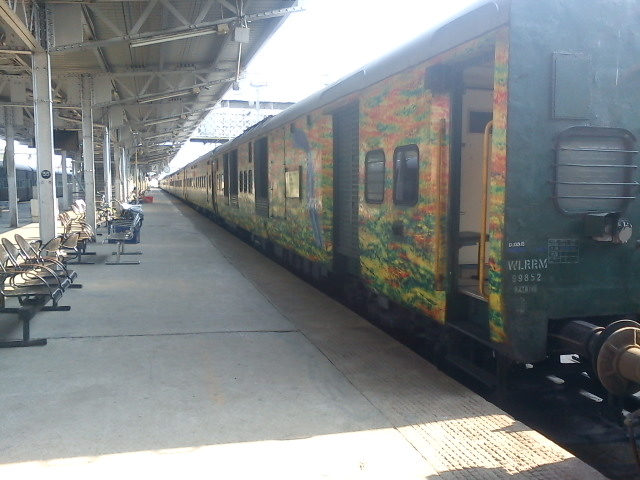
Duronto halted at Madurai Junction

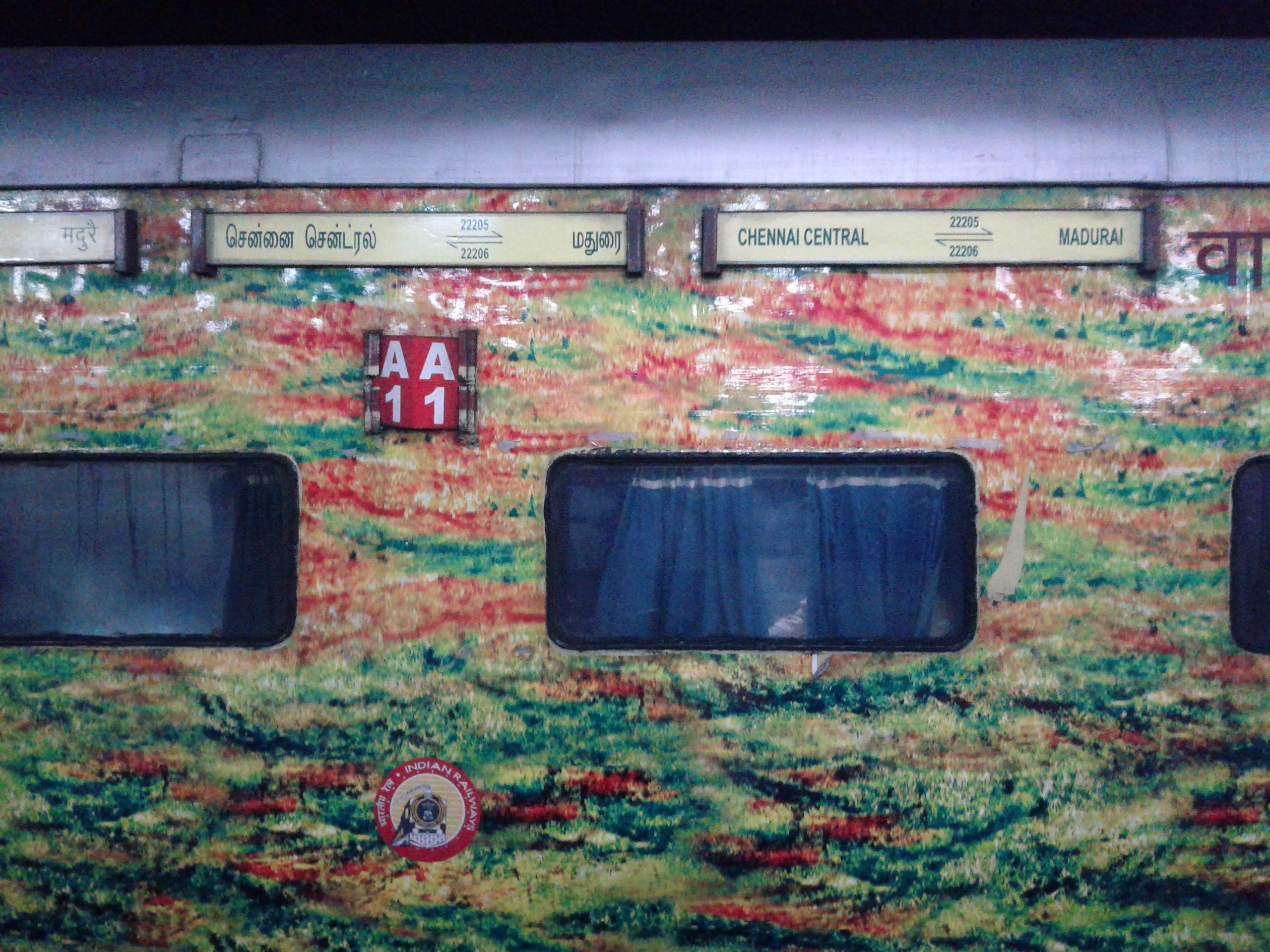
A View of AC 2-tier (2A) Coach

== See also ==
- Pandian Express
- Vaigai Express
- Duronto Express
