= List of railway stations in Madurai =

Madurai is a city serving as the gateway to southern Tamil Nadu and is the second largest city in the state. It is also the headquarters of the Madurai railway division, which is the largest among the six railway divisions of the Southern Railway zone in India. The city has several train stations, of which the Madurai Junction is the most important.

== List of Railway Stations in Madurai ==
List of railway stations in Madurai
| # | Station Name | | Railway Station Code | District | Present Condition |
| # | English | Tamil | Railway Station Code | District | Present Condition |
|---|---|---|---|---|---|
| 1 | Madurai Junction | மதுரை சந்திப்பு | MDU | Madurai | Functional |
| 2 | Koodal Nagar | கூடல் நகர் | KON | Madurai | Functional |
| 3 | Madurai East | மதுரை கிழக்கு (கீழ்மதுரை) | MES | Madurai | Functional |
| 4 | Thirupparankundram | திருப்பரங்குன்றம் | TDN | Madurai | Functional |
| 5 | Vadapalanji | வடபழஞ்சி | VAJ | Madurai | Functional |
| 6 | Nagamalai West | நாகமலை மேற்கு | NGMW | Madurai | Defunct |
| 7 | Silaimaan | சிலைமான் | ILA | Madurai | Functional |
| 8 | Samayanallur | சமயநல்லூர் | SER | Madurai | Functional |
| 9 | Sholavandan | சோழவந்தான் | SDN | Madurai | Functional |
| 10 | Vadipatti | வாடிப்பட்டி | VDP | Madurai | Functional |
| 11 | Tirumangalam | திருமங்கலம் | TMQ | Madurai | Functional |
| 12 | Kallikudi | கள்ளிக்குடி | KGD | Madurai | Functional |
| 13 | Usilampatti | உசிலம்பட்டி | USLP | Madurai | Functional |
| 14 | Karuppatti | கருப்பட்டி | KYR | Madurai | Defunct |
| 15 | Chekkanurani | செக்கானூரணி | | Madurai | Defunct |
| 16 | Sivarakkottai | சிவரக்கோட்டை | SVK | Madurai | Defunct |
| 17 | Karumathur | கருமாத்தூர் | KAMU | Madurai | Defunct |
| 18 | Sikkampatti | சிக்கம்பட்டி | SIK | Madurai | Defunct |
| 19 | Pasumalai | பசுமலை | PSQ | Madurai | Defunct |

== See also ==
- Transport in Madurai
