= Madurai East =

Madurai East may refer to:

- Madurai East (state assembly constituency)
- Madurai East block, a revenue block in the Madurai district of Tamil Nadu, India
- Madurai East railway station
