= Matharai =

Village in Madurai, Tamil Nadu

Matharai மாதுரை (Ancient name)
- Village
- Interactive map of Matharai
- Coordinates: 9.9685°N 77.7725°E
- Country: India
- State: Tamil Nadu
- District: Madurai district
- Taluk: Usilampatti

Languages
  - Official: Tamil
- Time zone: UTC+5:30 (IST)
- PIN: 625532

Matharai is a village located approximately 2 km west of Usilampatti town in Madurai district, Tamil Nadu, India. It lies around 44 km west of Madurai city and 37 km east of Theni town.

It is situated near the Madurai–Bodinayakkanur broad-gauge railway line and is accessible via local roads. The village is also close to National Highway NH 38 (Madurai–Theni route) and is well-connected by local buses and auto-rickshaws from Usilampatti.

The coordinates of Matharai are 9.9685°N 77.7725°E, and it has an average elevation of 215 metres (705 feet).

== Administration ==
Matharai comes under the jurisdiction of the Usilampatti taluk and is administered by the Nakkalapatti village panchayat. It is part of the Madurai district administrative structure.

== Connectivity ==
The nearest railway station is Usilampatti railway station, located on the Madurai–Bodinayakkanur branch line. The village is connected to surrounding areas via local roadways and public transport. NH 38, which links Madurai and Theni, passes nearby.
