= Samayanallur railway station =

Railway station in Tamil Nadu, India

Tirupparankundram சமயநல்லூர்

General information
- Location: Dindigul Road, Samayanallur, Madurai, Tamil Nadu
- Coordinates: 9.895980°N 78.116570°E
- Elevation: 171 metres (561 ft)
- System: Express train, Passenger train and Commuter rail station
- Line: Madurai–Dindigul line
- Platforms: 2

Construction
- Parking: Available
- Cycle facilities: Yes
- Accessible: Yes

Other information
- Status: Functional
- Station code: SER
- Zone(s): Southern Railway zone
- Division(s): Madurai
Location
- Location within Tamil Nadu

Samayanallur (station code: SER) is a railway station located in city of Madurai in the state of Tamil Nadu in India. The railway line to Madurai to Dindigul passes through the railway station.

== See also ==
- Madurai Junction
- Transport in Madurai
- Railway stations in Madurai
