= Rameswaram–Kanniyakumari Superfast Express =

Rameswaram–Kanniyakumari Express
Overview
- Service type: Superfast
- First service: 21 December 2009; 16 years ago
- Current operator: Southern Railway zone

Route
- Termini: Rameswaram (RMM); Kanniyakumari (CAPE)
- Stops: 10
- Distance travelled: 407 km (253 mi)
- Average journey time: 7h 20m
- Service frequency: Tri-weekly (Note: Runs three days in a week for every direction.)
- Train number: 22621/22622

On-board services
- Classes: AC 3 tier, Sleeper class, General Unreserved
- Seating arrangements: No
- Sleeping arrangements: Yes
- Catering facilities: On-board catering E-catering
- Observation facilities: ICF coach
- Entertainment facilities: No
- Baggage facilities: No
- Other facilities: Below the seats

Technical
- Rolling stock: 2
- Track gauge: 1,676 mm (5 ft 6 in)
- Operating speed: 56.5 km/h (35 mph), including halts

The Rameswaram–Kanniyakumari Express is a Superfast train belonging to Southern Railway zone that runs between Rameswaram and Kanniyakumari in India. It is currently being operated with 22621/22622 train numbers on tri-weekly basis. It is the only superfast express train service that originates and terminates within south Tamil Nadu region itself. This train service is mainly introduced to connect two important world famous Tourist Spots of Tamil Nadu and India so that tourist who can able to visit to these places easily.

== Service ==
The 22621/Rameswaram–Kanniyakumari Superfast Express has an average speed of 56 km/h and covers 407 km in 7h 20m. The 22622/Kanniyakumari–Rameswaram Superfast Express has an average speed of 56 km/h and covers 407 km in 7h 20m.

This train has a single rake reversal at Madurai Junction. At present from Rameswaram to Madurai this train is powered by Diesel Traction and from Madurai to Kanyakumari this train is powered by electric traction and vice versa. This train's rakes are being Shared with Rameswaram–Tirupathi Meenakshi Express.

== Coach composition ==
- 3 AC III Tier
- 12 Sleeper coaches
- 6 General
- 2 Second-class Luggage/parcel van

== See also ==
- Rameswaram railway station
- Kanniyakumari railway station
- Rameswaram–Tirupathi Meenakshi Express
