= Kodaikanal Road railway station =

Railway station in Tamil Nadu, India

Kodaikanal Road கொடைக்கானல் சாலை
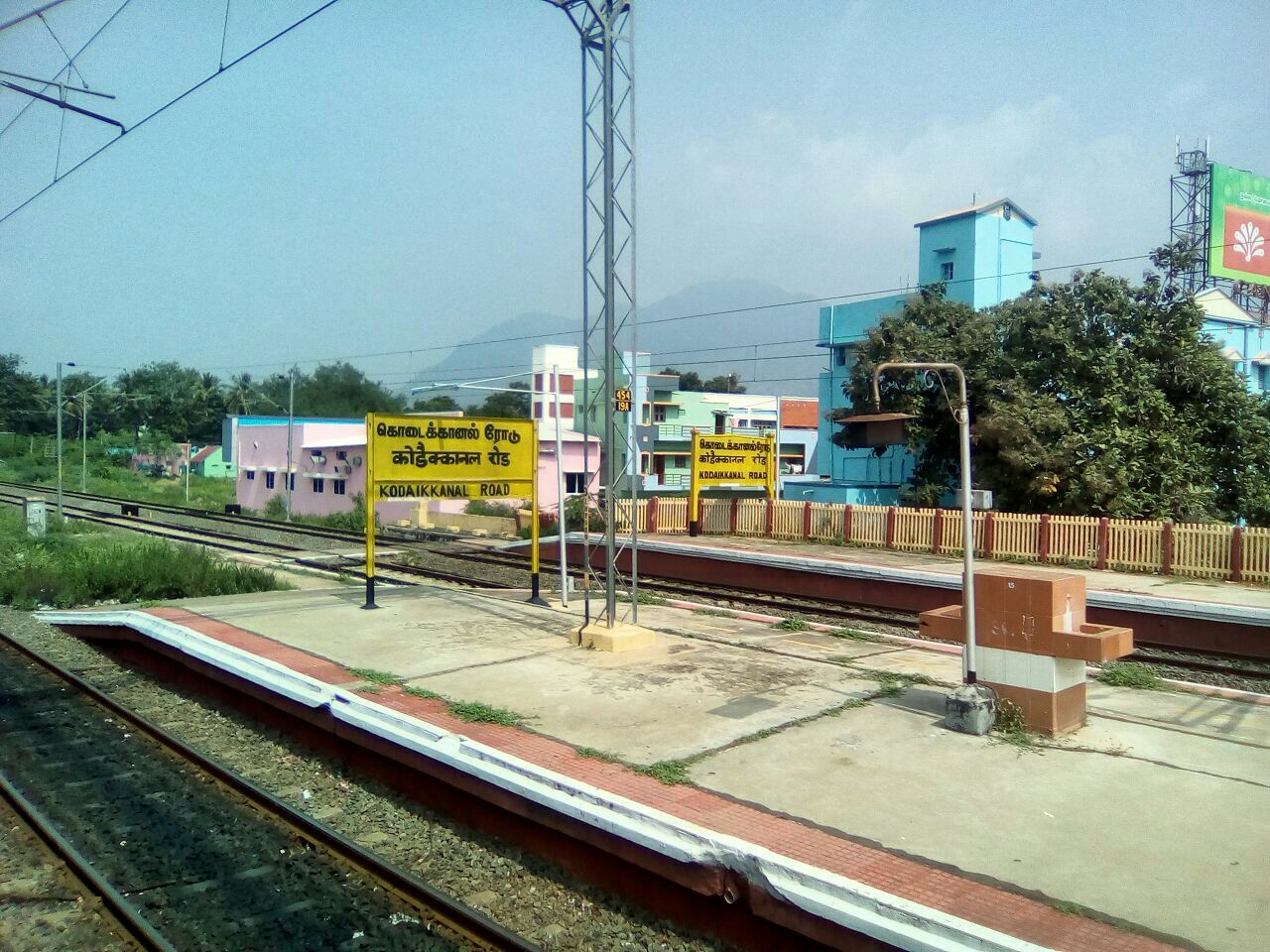

General information
- Other names: Kodai Road
- Location: Ammaianayakkanur Byepass, Kodai Road, Dindigul district Tamil Nadu; India
- Coordinates: 10.17961°N 77.90959°E
- Elevation: 240 metres (790 ft)
- System: Indian Railways station
- Owner: Indian Railways
- Operator: Southern Railway

Construction
- Structure type: Standard on ground

Other information
- Station code: KQN
- Zone(s): Southern Railway zone
- Division(s): Madurai
Location
- Location within Tamil Nadu Location within India

Kodai Road railway station (station code: KQN) is an NSG–5 category Indian railway station in Madurai railway division of Southern Railway zone. It is a railway station in Tamil Nadu state, India, lying between Dindigul and Madurai at 10°10′45″N 77°54′34″E. It is formally listed as Kodaikanal Road (railway station code KQN).

== History ==
In 1875, the Great Southern of India Railway Co. extended its line from Chennai to Tirunelveli and a train station named Kodai Road was built near Ammaianayakkanur village, to facilitate visits to the then new hill station of Kodaikanal. It has been operated by the Southern Railway Zone of the Indian Railways since 1951.

Once upon a time, it acted as a Junction railway station. The line was existed during the period of 1920 to 1930. This line goes through Nilakottai, Periyakulam, Teni Junction, Cumbum, Kumily lower camp. It had several branch lines one from Periyakulam to Kodaikanal foothills i.e. Vellagavi where the goods are used to transport from the hill plantations to the plains of periyakulam, and the other one from Teni to Kottagudi via Bodi Nayakkanur, Kurangani (Just located 5 km distance from Topslip Station where Kundala valley railway line ends). But later this line was dematerialized for unknown reasons. The map of this line is found in Imperial Gazetter of India.

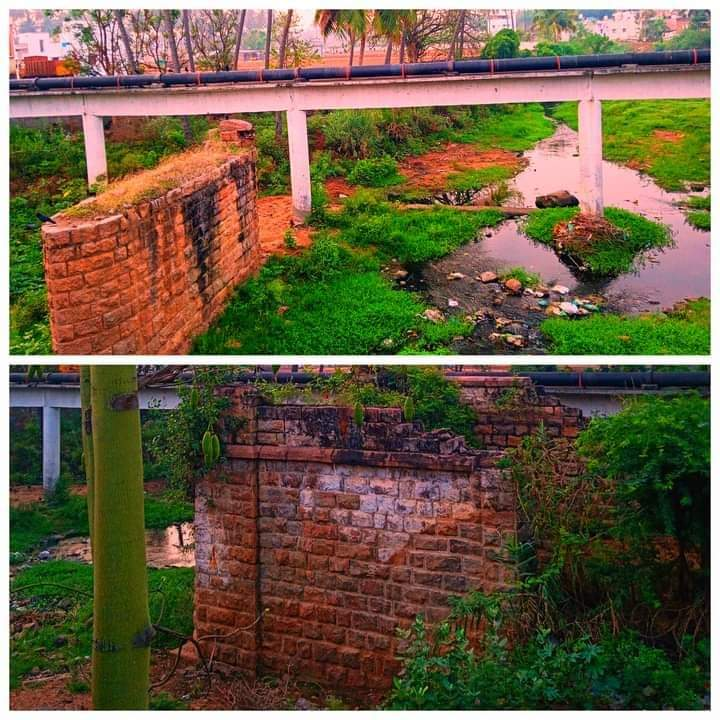
Ruins of British Era Railway Bridge at Periyakulam (a part of the Ammanayakkanur i.e., Kodaikanal Road railway station to Karuwanuthu railway stretch)

== Transfer point ==
Kodai Road continues to serve as the rail to bus transfer point for passengers going to the now popular tourist destination of Kodaikanal, about 2 hours distant via the SH-156 Ghat Road. It also serves the nearby village of Kolinchipatti. This village is famous for flowers. Among the approximately 30 trains per day that serve Kodai Road is the Pandian Express, which runs between Chennai Egmore and Madurai.

== See also ==
- List of railway stations in India
