= Thiruparankundram Dargah =

Sufi shrine and mosque complex in Tamil Nadu, India

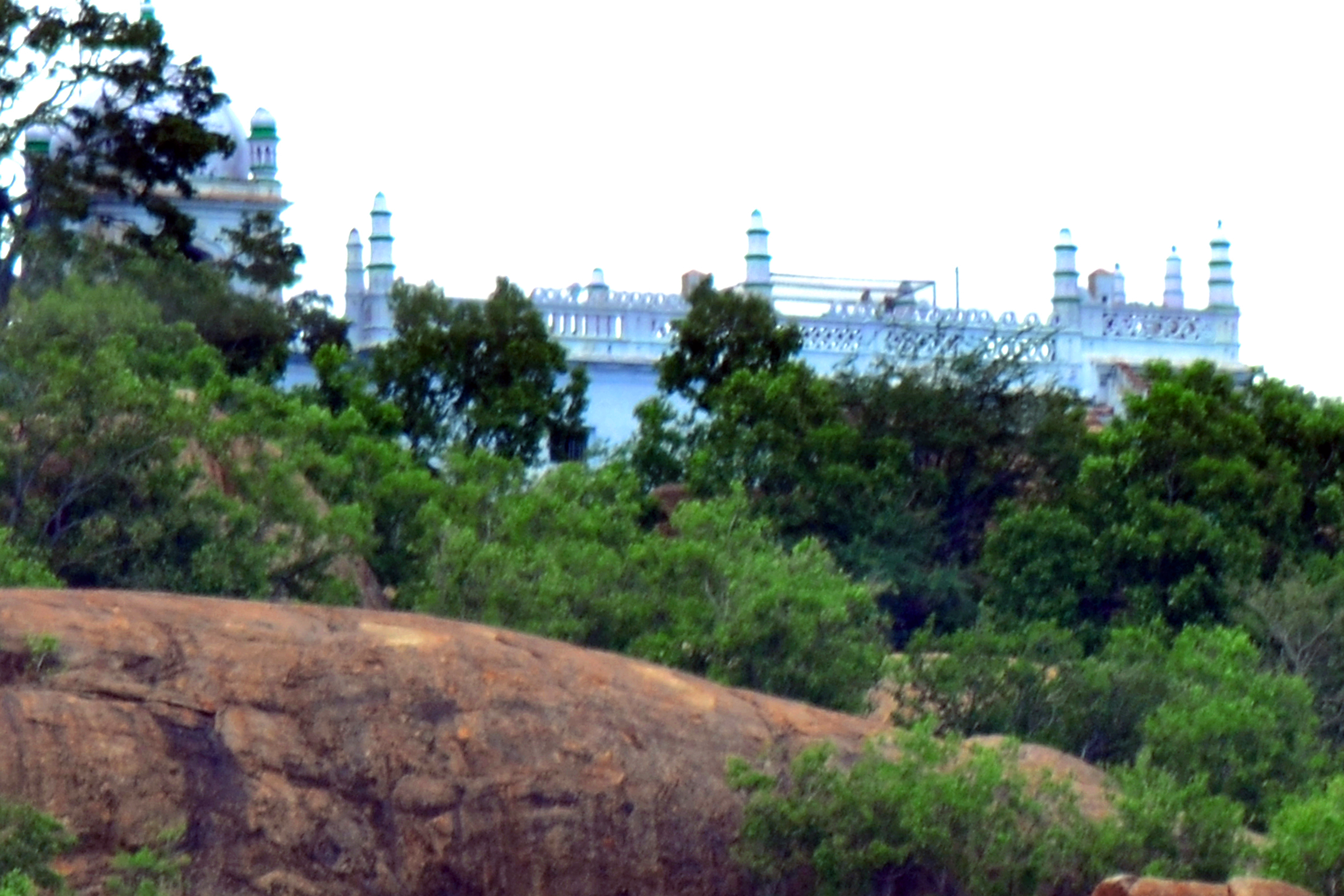
- A view of the dargah

- Location of the mosque and dargah in Tamil Nadu

Religion
- Affiliation: Sunni Islam
- Sect: Sufism
- Festivals: Eid; Ramadan; Santhanakoodu
- Ecclesiastical or organisational status: Dargah and mosque
- Status: Active

Location
- Location: Thiruparankundram, Madurai district, Tamil Nadu
- Country: India
- Coordinates: 9°52′35″N 78°04′09″E

Architecture
- Type: Mosque architecture
- Style: Indo-Islamic
- Completed: 13th century CE

Specifications
- Dome: 1
- Minaret: 12

The Thiruparankundram Dargah, also known as Thirupparankundram malai Dargah, is a dargah (Sufi shrine) located in Thiruparankundram, Madurai district of the Indian state of Tamil Nadu. Located on the northeastern side of the Tirupparankundram hillock, the Dargah was built in the 13th century CE as a memorial for Saint Sikandar Badushah, who was warlord died on war. Ilayangudi landlord Miran Mugaidheen Rowther was rebuild the dargah in 1805. the death anniversary of Sikandar Badusha is commemorated as the Santhanakoodu festival on the 17th night of the Islamic month of Rajab every Hijri year.

== History ==
Sikandar Shah was born on 1211 AD, the tamil warlord and islamic saint who lived in madurai at 13th century, he died on war in 13th century the followers of Sikkandhar Badusha, who was believed to be a Sufi mystic, built a memorial for him atop the hill, which was expanded in the later years.

While the hill and the surrounding areas, which also hosts several Hindu temples including the Murugan Temple complex, and Jain relics, has seen coexistence of various religious practices over the years, it been a subject of occasional dispute since the early 20th century. Adjudicating in a related dispute, in October 2025, the Madras High Court declared that the hill was a protected monument as declared by the Archaeological Survey of India in 1908 and 1923, and affirmed the ownership of the hill to the temple excluding the 0.33 acres (0.13 ha) of land on which the dargah is located. It also upheld a ruling that banned animal sacrifice at the site, while permitting the annual Santhanakoodu festival, and restricted prayers at the dargah to the occasions of Eid and Ramadan.

== Gallery ==
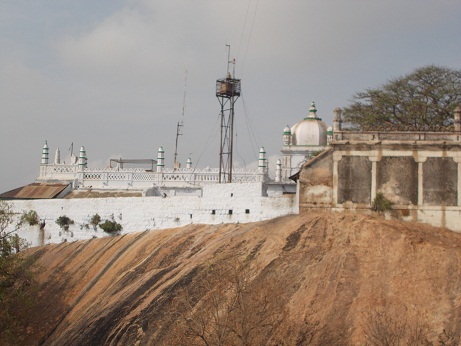
Side view of the dargah (2013)

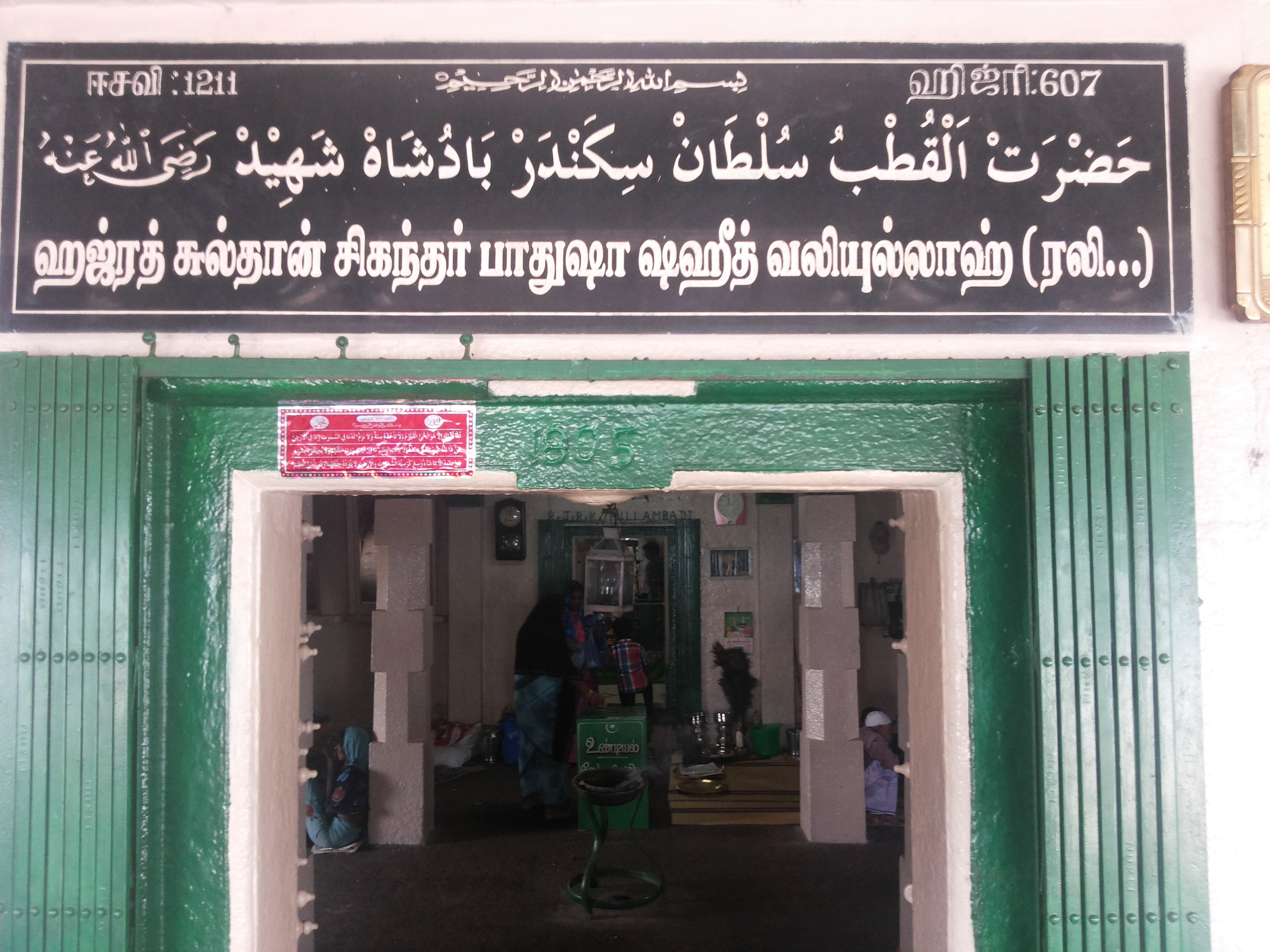
Entrance to the dargah

== See also ==
- Islam in India
- List of dargahs in Tamil Nadu
- List of mosques in India
- Samanar Hills
