= Tiruparankundram railway station =

Railway station in Tamil Nadu, India

Tiruparankundram

General information
- Location: GST Road, Thiruparankundram, Madurai, Tamil Nadu
- Coordinates: 9.876466°N 78.063334°E
- Elevation: 171 metres (561 ft)
- System: Indian Railways
- Line: Madurai–Tirunelveli line
- Platforms: 2

Construction
- Parking: Available

Other information
- Status: Functional
- Station code: TDN
- Zone(s): Southern Railway zone
- Division(s): Madurai

History
- Opened: 1876; 150 years ago
- Rebuilt: 2022; 4 years ago During Double Line

Passengers
- 2022–23: 227,855 (per year); 624 (per day)
Location
- Location within Tamil Nadu

Tirupparankundram (station code: TDN) is an NSG–5 category Indian railway station in Madurai railway division of Southern Railway zone. It serves Thiruparankundram, located in Madurai district of the Indian state of Tamil Nadu. It was commissioned on 1 January 1876. along with Madurai junction to Tuticorin section before independence.

== Performance and earnings ==
For the FY 2022–23, the annual earnings of the station was ₹50,184,529 (US$520,000) and daily earnings was ₹137,492 (US$1,400). For the same financial year, the annual passenger count was 227,855 and daily count was 624. While, the footfall per day was recorded as 738.

== See also ==
- Madurai Junction
- Transport in Madurai
- Railway stations in Madurai
