= Usilampatti railway station =

Railway station in India

Usilampatti

General information
- Location: State Highway 154, Usilampatti, Madurai district, Tamil Nadu; India
- Coordinates: 9.9711°N 77.7928°E
- Elevation: 216 metres (709 ft)
- System: Indian Railways station
- Owner: Indian Railways
- Operator: Southern Railway
- Line: Madurai–Bodinayakkanur branch line
- Platforms: 2
- Tracks: 4

Construction
- Structure type: Standard (on ground station)

Other information
- Status: Functioning
- Station code: USLP
- Zone(s): Southern Railway zone
- Division(s): Madurai

History
- Opened: 20 November 1928
- Closed: 1942–1954; 2011–2020
- Rebuilt: 23 January 2020

Passengers
- 2022–23: 11,830 per year 32 per day

Services
Preceding station	Indian Railways	Following station
Sikkampatti Halt towards ?	Madurai–Bodinayakkanur branch line	Doddappanayakkanur Halt towards ?
Route map
Location
- Location within India Location within Tamil Nadu

Usilampatti (station code:USLP) is an NSG–6 category Indian railway station in Madurai railway division of Southern Railway zone. It serves Usilampatti, located in Madurai district of the Indian state of Tamil Nadu. It is a railway station on Madurai–Bodinayakkanur branch line.

== Location ==
Usilampatti railway station serves Usilampatti town in Madurai district. It pertains to Madurai railway division, part of Southern Railway zone of Indian Railways.

== History ==
Usilampatti railway station was inaugurated together with the Madurai–Bodinayakkanur 90 km branch line in 20 November 1928 as metre-gauge railway by the Madras Provincial revenue member Norman Marjoribanks. Later in 1942, during the Second World War, the line was closed and the tracks were removed. After India's Independence, between 1953 and 1954, the track was restored.

The Madurai–Bodinayakkanur line was sanctioned for gauge conversion, from metre gauge (1,000 mm (3 ft 3 3/8 in)) to broad gauge (1,676 mm (5 ft 6 in)). It was closed on 1 of January 2011, expecting to reopen it by 2012, but due to lack of funds, the project advanced at very slow pace. Finally, on 23 of January 2020, the first stretch between Madurai Junction and Usilampatti (37 km) was inaugurated, after passing the inspection of the Commission of Railway Safety.

== Services ==
As of January 2020, there are no train services. According to the Madurai Member of the Parliament, S. Venkatesan, the train will run to Usilampatti by the end of February 2020, and by April, up to the terminus at Bodinayakkanur, when is expected to complete the gauge conversion works on the branch line.

== Performance and earnings ==
For the FY 2022–23, the annual earnings of the station was ₹326,915 (US$3,400) and daily earnings was ₹896 (US$9.30). For the same financial year, the annual passenger count was 11,830 and daily count was 32. While, the footfall per day was recorded as 55.
