= Chennai–Palakkad Superfast Express =

Indian train route

MGR Chennai Central - Palakkad Jn Superfast Express
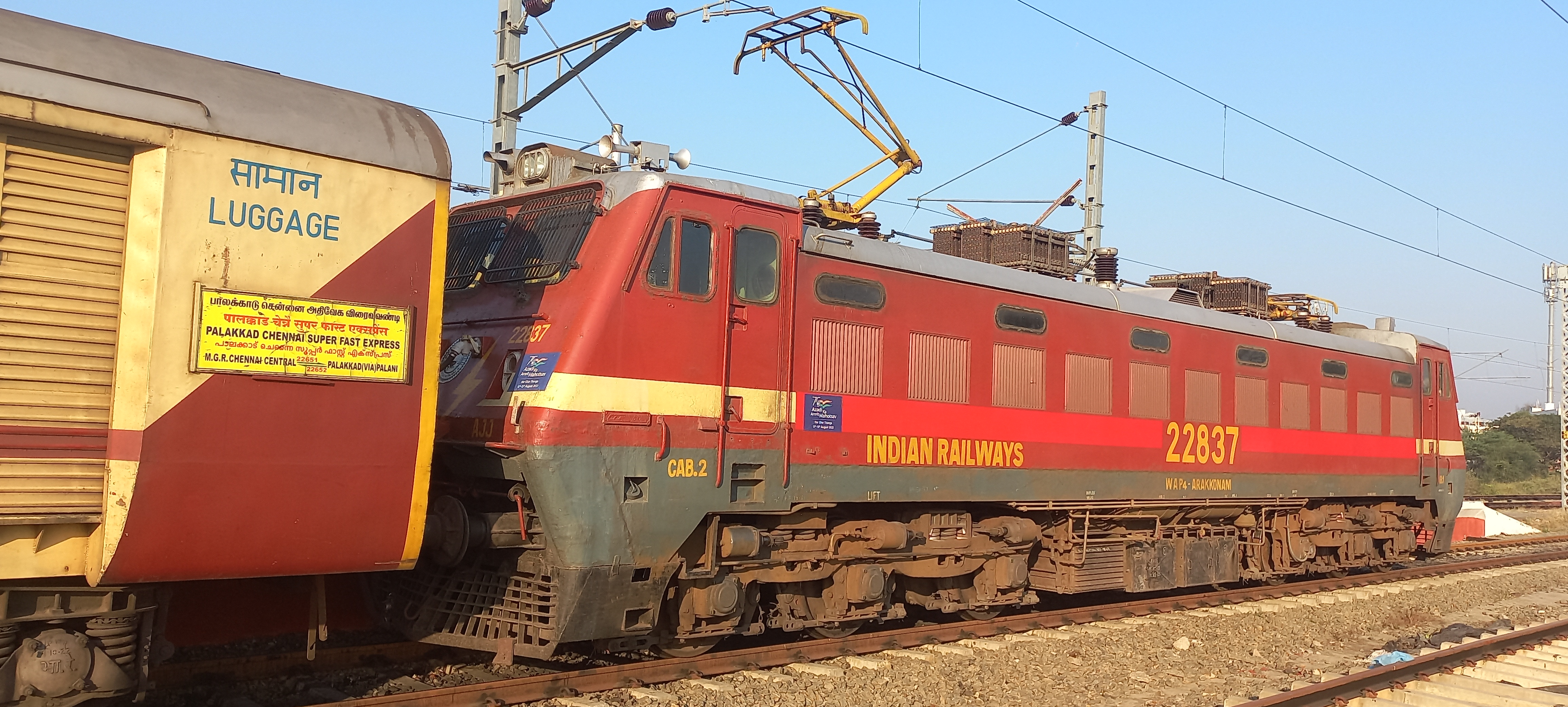
- MGR CHENNAI CENTRAL PALAKKAD JUNCTION SUPERFAST EXPRESS ( PALANI EXPRESS )

Overview
- Service type: Superfast Express
- Locale: Tamil Nadu, Kerala
- First service: 1 October 2013; 12 years ago
- Current operator: Southern Railways

Route
- Termini: MGR Chennai Central (MAS); Palakkad Junction (PGT)
- Stops: 19
- Distance travelled: 672 km (418 mi)
- Average journey time: 9 Hours 35 minutes
- Service frequency: Daily
- Train number: 22651/22652

On-board services
- Classes: AC First, AC 2 Tier, AC 3 Tier, Sleeper Class, Second Sitting, General Unreserved.
- Seating arrangements: YES
- Sleeping arrangements: Yes
- Auto-rack arrangements: YES
- Catering facilities: Yes
- Observation facilities: Large windows
- Entertainment facilities: Yes
- Baggage facilities: LUGGAGE CUM SEATING COACH

Technical
- Rolling stock: ICF coach pulled by WAP-4 from Electric Loco Shed, Arakkonam
- Track gauge: 1,676 mm (5 ft 6 in)
- Electrification: 100%
- Operating speed: 85 km/h (53 mph) average with halts
Route map
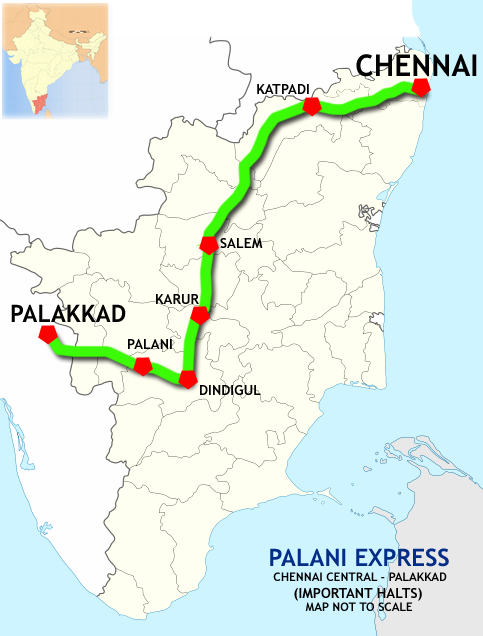

The 22651/22652 MGR Chennai Central - Palakkad Superfast Express is a daily express train between MGR Chennai Central (MAS) and Palakkad Junction railway station (PGT) by Southern Railways via Palani. This is the only train that connects Palani, Udumalaipettai & Pollachi with the state capital Chennai. The train covers a distance of 672 km (418 mi) at an average speed of 57 km/h (35 mph).

== History ==
Initially, the train ran between Chennai Central and Palani. It was later extended up to Pollachi Junction as a special train between Palani and Pollachi. In 2017, the train was further extended up to Palakkad Junction, thus serving two states - Tamil Nadu and Kerala.

== Route ==
The train operates from Chennai Central to Palakkad Junction via Arakkonam Junction, Katpadi Junction, Jolarpet Junction, Salem Junction, Karur Junction, Dindigul Junction, Pollachi Junction.

== Coach composition ==
It runs with ICF-CBC coaches.

Loco	1	2	3	4	5	6	7	8	9	10	11	12	13	14	15	16	17	18	19	20	21
	SLR	UR	UR	S10	S9	S8	S7	S6	S5	S4	S3	S2	S1	B2	B1	A2	A1	H1	UR	UR	SLR
