= Kolinchipatti =

Kolinchipatti or Kolinjipatti is a village in Madurai district, Tamil Nadu state, India, lying between Dindigul and Madurai, near Nilakkottai. It is very near to Kodaikanal Road (approx 1 km away).

It is very famous for flower cultivation. In particular the flower called Nerium oleander (in Tamil "arali") is being cultivated abundantly. Other kinds of flowers, such as rose, jasmine, jamanki, pitchipoo, kaakarataan poo, etc., are cultivated here. Apart from flowers, sugarcane, paddy, mulberry, mango, sapota, grapes, ground nuts, etc., are cultivated.

Presently, the village is facing widespread drought and unemployment, as a result of which many are migrating to other places in search of better jobs. Yet another reason is that the young generation shows no interest in the traditional farming business as unfortunately it is not attractive any more in terms of financial return.

The caste system of Tamil Nadu is still prevalent there, and a majority of the residents are Gowders. There are Naickars in the nearby village of Meenakshipuram.
