= Muthupatti =

Neighbourhood in Madurai district, Tamil Nadu, India

- village
- Location in Tamil Nadu, India Muthupatti (India)
- Coordinates: 9°53′42″N 78°05′32″E
- Country: India
- State: Tamil Nadu
- District: Madurai

Languages
  - Official: Tamil
- Time zone: UTC+5:30 (IST)

Muthupatti is a village in Madurai district of Tamil Nadu, India.
