= Madurai East railway station =

Railway station in Tamil Nadu, India

General information
- Location: Kamarajapuram Road, Kamarajapuram, Balarangapuram, Madurai, Tamil Nadu; India
- Coordinates: 9.9091°N 78.1346°E
- Elevation: 135 metres (443 ft)
- System: Indian Railways station
- Owner: Indian Railways
- Operator: Madurai railway division
- Line: Rameswaram–Manamadurai line
- Platforms: 1
- Tracks: 3
- Connections: Auto stand

Construction
- Structure type: Standard (on ground station)
- Parking: No
- Cycle facilities: No

Other information
- Status: Functioning
- Station code: MES
- Fare zone: Southern Railway

History
- Former names: Madras and Southern Mahratta Railway

Passengers
- 2022–23: 62,160 per year 170 per day
Location

Madurai East railway station (station code:MES) is an NSG–6 category Indian railway station in Madurai railway division of Southern Railway zone. It serves Madurai, located in Madurai district of the Indian state of Tamil Nadu.

== Performance and earnings ==
For the FY 2022–23, the annual earnings of the station was ₹2,427,795 (US$25,000) and daily earnings was ₹6,651 (US$69). For the same financial year, the annual passenger count was 62,160 and daily count was 170. While, the footfall per day was recorded as 259.
