= Madurai–Tirunelveli line =

Indian railway line

Madurai–Virudhunagar–Tirunelveli Line
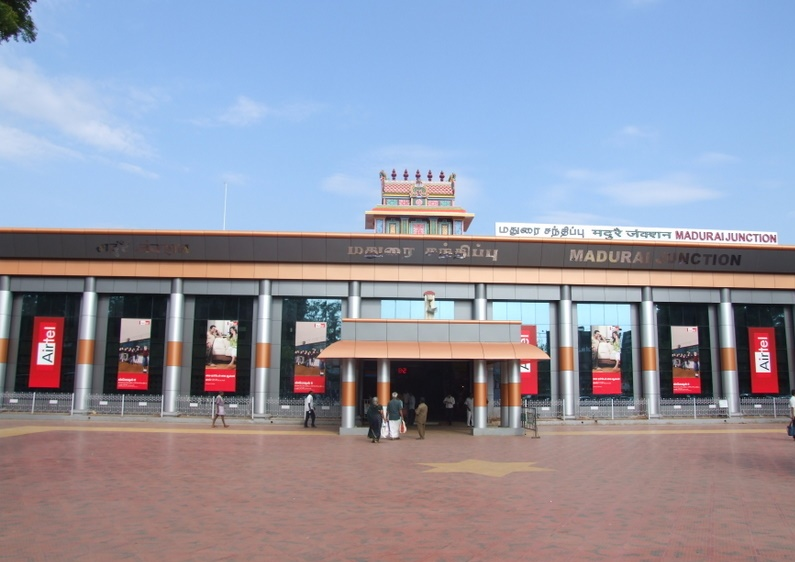
- Madurai Railway Station

Overview
- Native name: மதுரை – விருதுநகர் – திருநெல்வேலி ரயில் பாதை
- Status: Operational
- Owner: Southern Railways
- Locale: Tamil Nadu
- Termini: Tirunelveli; Madurai
- Connecting lines: Madurai Jn – Virudhunagar Jn; Madurai Jn – Manamadurai Jn; Bodinayakkanur – Madurai Jn; Dindigul Jn – Madurai Jn
- Stations: 18
- Website: Southern Railway

Service
- Type: Regional Line
- Operator(s): Madurai Division
- Rolling stock: WAP1, WAP4, WAP7, WDP-3, WDP4D, WDG4, WDG3, WAG9

History
- Opened: 1 January 1876

Technical
- Track length: 157.1 km (97.6 mi)
- Number of tracks: 1
- Track gauge: 1,676 mm (5 ft 6 in)
- Electrification: Overhead catenary
- Operating speed: 100 km/h (62 mph)
- Signalling: Three-aspect Colour-Light signalling (3CL)

The Madurai–Virudhunagar–Tirunelveli Line is a railway line connecting the cities of Madurai, Virudhunagar and Tirunelveli in the state of Tamil Nadu in India. The line was inaugurated on 1 January 1876. This railway is under control of Southern Railways. It covers 157.1 km. The line covers the districts of Tirunelveli, Thoothukudi, Viruthunagar and Madurai. The speed limit for most of this rail is 100 km/h.

== History ==
Initially, this line was inaugurated on 1 January 1876 as Maniyachchi Junction - Tirunelveli in metre-gauge. The conversion from meter gauge to broad gauge completed on 4 August 1981. The gauge conversion process was performed by retaining the old meter-gauge line and constructing the new line on the other side to avoid extended cancellation of service.

The electrification process for the line started in January 2010 and it has been fully electrified since January 3, 2015.

The doubling process of the Madurai to Tirunelveli line was started in January 2018 and was completed in March 2023.

== Stations ==
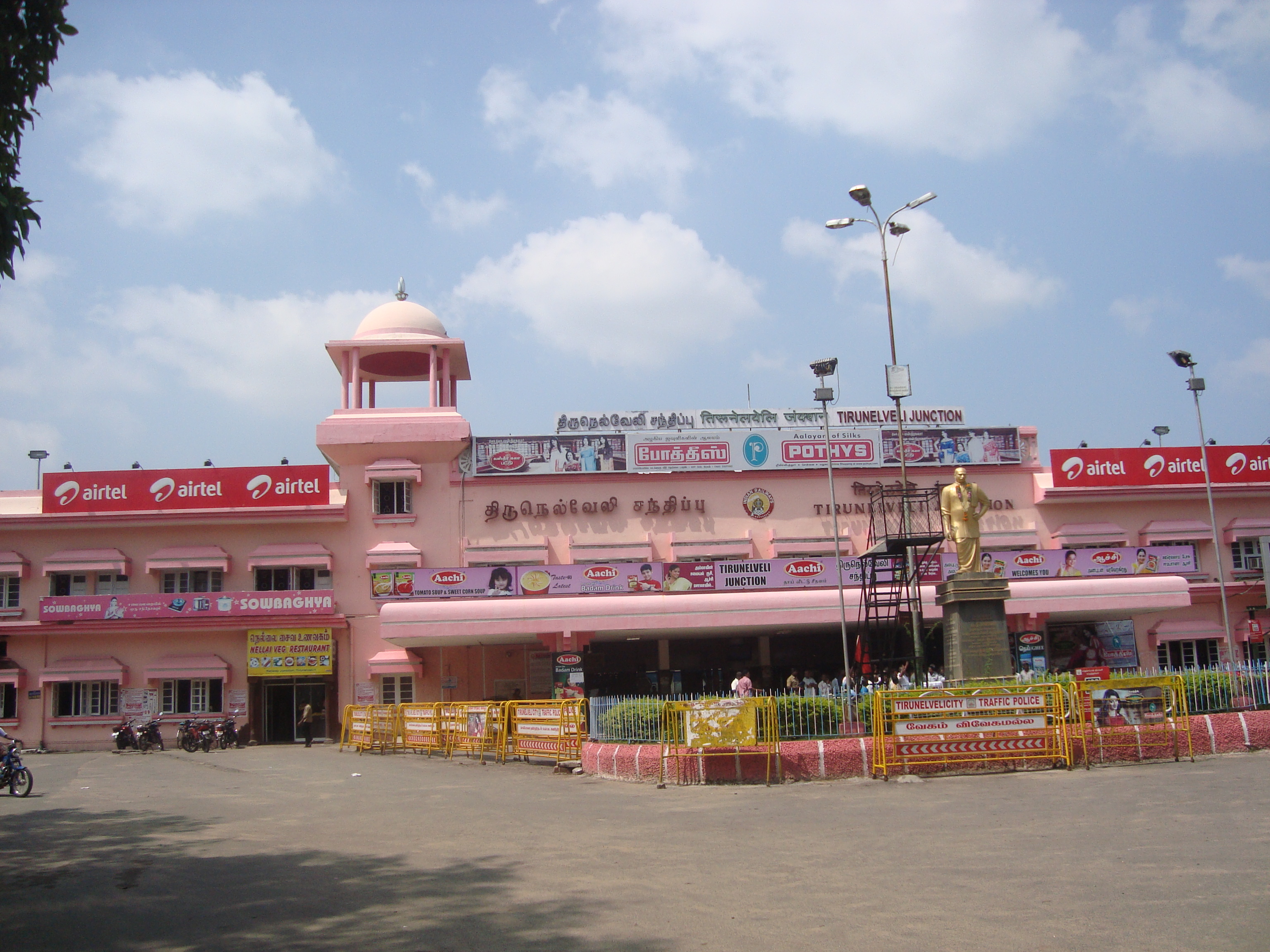
Tirunelveli Railway Station

There are a total of 18 stations in the route, some of the most important being Madurai Junction,Virudhunagar Junction, Sattur, Kovilpatti, and Tirunelveli Junction.

S.No	Station	Station Code	Old Category	New Category
1	Madurai Jn	MDU	A1	NSG2
2	Tirupparankundram	TDN	D	NSG5
3	Tirumangalam	TMQ	D	NSG5
4	Kalligudi	KGD	E	NSG6
5	Virudunagar Jn	VPT	A	NSG4
6	Tulukapati	TY	E	NSG6
7	Satur	SRT	B	NSG5
8	Kovilpatti	CVP	A	NSG4
9	Kadambur	KDU	E	NSG6
10	Vanchi Maniyachchi Jn	MEJ	D	NSG5
11	Naraikkinar	NRK	E	NSG6
12	Gangaikondan	GDN	E	NSG6
13	Talaiyuthu	TAY	E	NSG6
14	Tirunelveli Jn	TEN	A	NSG3
