= Dindigul Junction railway station =

Railway station in Tamil Nadu, India

Dindigul Junction திண்டுக்கல் சந்திப்பு
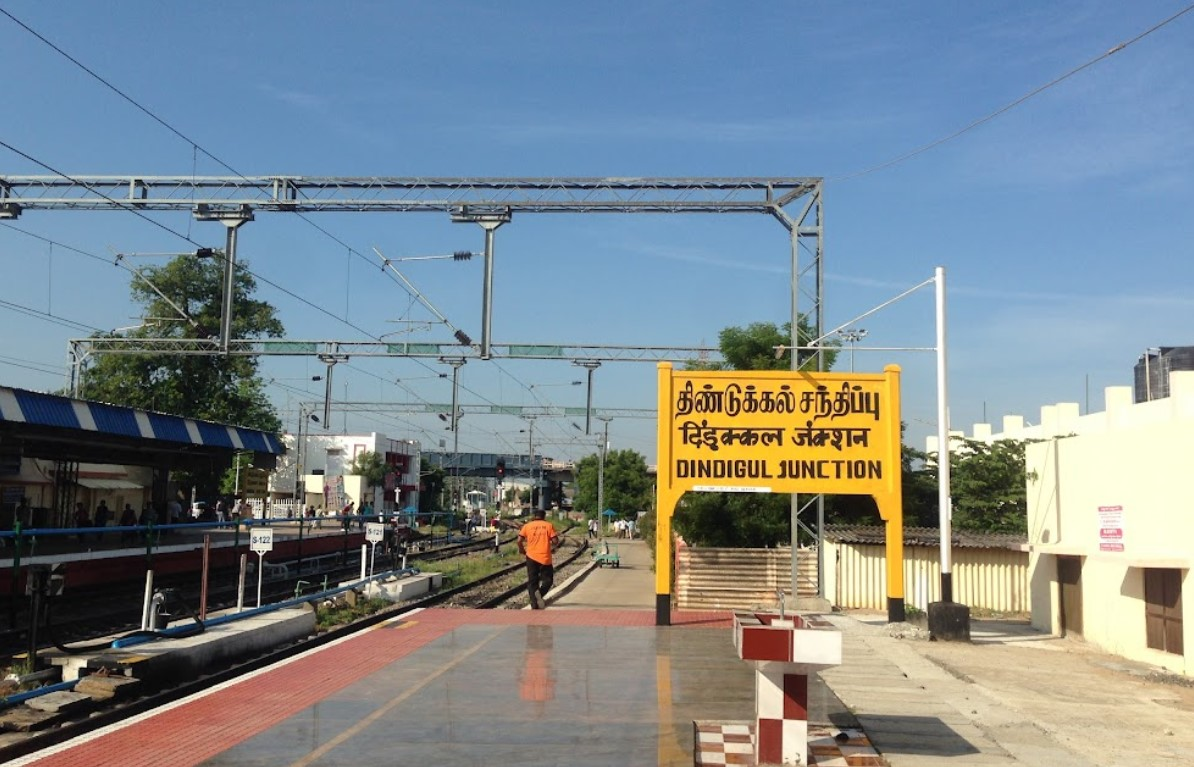
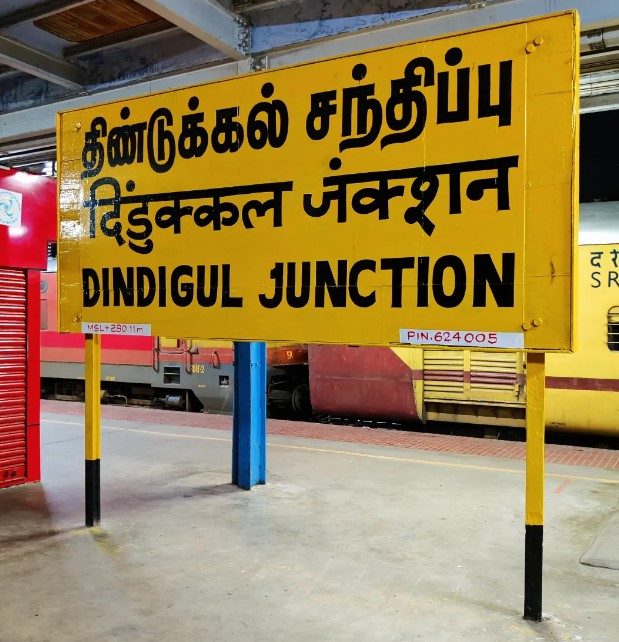
- Photo 1 → DG Junction Platform heading towards Madurai Junction; Photo 2 → Nameboard of this station

General information
- Location: Junction Rd, Dindigul Dindigul district, Tamil Nadu; India
- Coordinates: 10.353469964938924°N 77.98417537164268°E
- Elevation: 287 m (942 ft)
- System: Indian Railways station
- Owner: Indian Railways
- Operator: Southern Railway zone
- Platforms: 5
- Connections: Bus stand, Taxicab stand, Auto rickshaw stand

Construction
- Structure type: Standard (on ground station)
- Parking: Yes

Other information
- Status: Functioning
- Station code: DG
- Zone(s): Southern Railway
- Division(s): Madurai

Passengers
- 2022–23: 2,011,715 (per year); 5,512 (per day)
Track layout
Location
- Location within Tamil Nadu Location within India

Dindigul Junction railway station (station code: DG) is an NSG–3 category Indian railway station in Madurai railway division of Southern Railway zone. The station serves the city of Dindigul, located in Dindigul district of the Indian state of Tamil Nadu.

== History ==
Dindigul was major junction point right from metre-gauge era. Metre-gauge routes to Coimbatore Junction railway, Tiruchirappalli Junction and Madurai Junction. In 1990s, the first broad-gauge line was established by Karur and Madurai broad-gauge track.

The line between Madurai and Dindigul was a metre-gauge and broad-gauge parallel lines. After gauge conversion between Chennai Egmore and Madurai, Palani route was the sole metre-gauge section in the entire western Tamil Nadu. Around 2012, Dindigul–Palani section was converted into broad gauge, Chennai Palani Express commenced its service. The Dindigul to Palani railway line was electrified in 2022.

== Location and layout ==
The Dindigul Junction is located on the eastern side of the city adjacent to the city's SIDCO industrial estate. the station going to remodeled soon by southern railways and madurai division has announced the DPR tenders on southern railway site. The station bears the intersection of four branching railway lines and the next nearest train stations are:

- Ambathurai railway station (South)
- Tamaraipadi railway station (East)
- Akkaraippatti railway station (West)
- Eriodu railway station (North)

Madurai Airport is the nearest airport.

=== Lines ===
- BG electrified Twin Single line towards Madurai
- BG electrified double line towards Trichy
- BG electrified single line towards Karur
- BG electrified single line towards Pollachi

== Performance and earnings ==
For the FY 2022–23, the annual earnings of the station was ₹428,934,623 (US$4.5 million) and daily earnings was ₹1,175,163 (US$12,000). For the same financial year, the annual passenger count was 2,011,715 and daily count was 5,512. While, the footfall per day was recorded as 11,291.

== New Lines in Proposal ==
Dindigul-Karaikudi new BG line: Reconnaissance Engineering cum Traffic Survey for a new BG line between Dindigul and Karaikkudi via Natham and Thirupattur (105.60 km) was conducted and Survey Report was sent to Railway Board on 06.07.2015. This project was shelved by Railway Board.
