= Bodinayakkanur railway station =

Railway station in Tamil Nadu, India

Bodinayakkanur
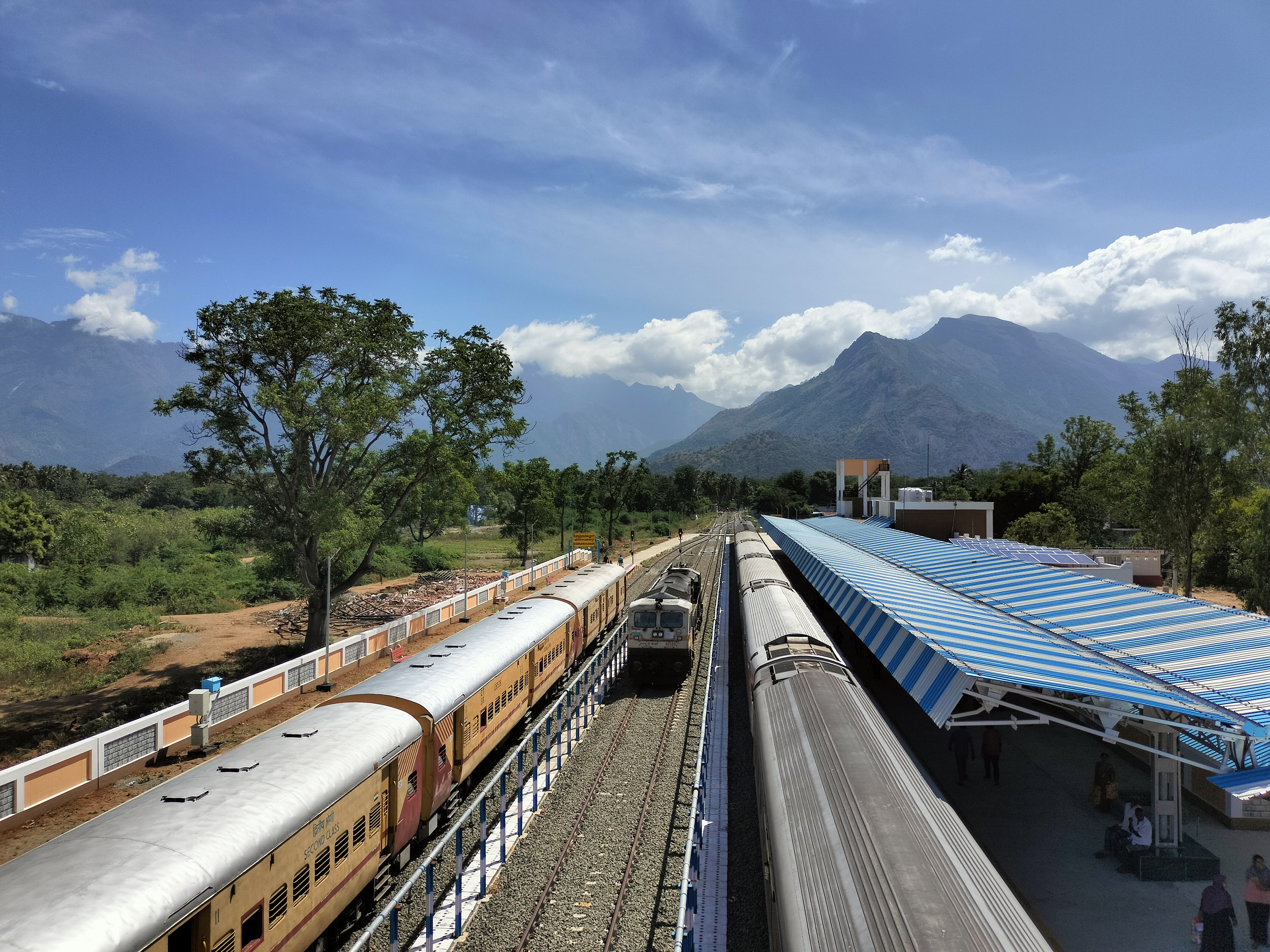
- Bodinayakkanur Railway Station with Palani Hills

General information
- Location: Railway Station Rd, Suburaj Nagar, Bodinayakkanur, Theni district, Tamil Nadu; India
- Coordinates: 10°1′5″N 77°20′43″E
- Elevation: 348 metres (1,142 ft)
- System: Indian Railways station
- Owner: Indian Railways
- Operator: Southern Railway
- Line: Madurai–Bodinayakkanur branch line
- Platforms: 2
- Tracks: 3

Construction
- Structure type: Standard (on-ground station)
- Parking: Available
- Accessible: Disabled access

Other information
- Status: Functioning
- Station code: BDNK
- Zone(s): Southern Railway
- Division(s): Madurai
- Fare zone: Southern Railway

History
- Opened: 1909
- Closed: 1915–1928; 1942–1954; 2011 – 2023
- Rebuilt: 2023

Services
3 A DAY
Preceding station	Indian Railways	Following station
Boothipuram Halt towards ?	Madurai–Bodinayakkanur branch line	Terminus
Route map
Location
- Location within India Location within Tamil Nadu

Bodinayakkanur railway station (station code:BDNK) is an NSG–6 category Indian railway station in Madurai railway division of Southern Railway zone. It is a railway station on Madurai–Bodinayakkanur branch line, serving the town of Bodinayakkanur in Tamil Nadu state, India.

== History ==
Theni Junction railway station was inaugurated in 1909 as a Light railway line (610mm), later that line was closed due to World War I in 1915. Later Bodinayakkanur railway station was inaugurated together with the Madurai–Bodinayakkanur 90 km branch line in 20 November 1928 as narrow-gauge railway (762mm) by the Madras Provincial revenue member Norman Marjoribanks. Later in 1942, during the Second World War, the line was closed and the tracks were removed. After India's Independence, between 1953 and 1954, the track was restored.

The Madurai–Bodinayakkanur line was sanctioned for gauge conversion, from metre-gauge (1,000 mm (3 ft 3 3/8 in)) to broad-gauge (1,676 mm (5 ft 6 in)). It was closed on 1 January 2011, expecting to reopen it by 2012, but due to lack of funds, the project advanced at very slow pace. Finally, on 23 January 2020, the first stretch between Madurai Junction and Usilampatti (37 km) was inaugurated, after passing the inspection of the Commission of Railway Safety. The remaining 53 km Usilampatti–Bodinayakkanur section is expected to reopen in April 2020.

During 1909 a narrow-gauge railway line was surveyed between Kodaikanal Road railway station to Kumily Lower Camp via Nilakottai, Periyakulam, Theni, Cumbum. It had several branch lines in-between Periyakulam to Kodaikanal foothills and theni to Kottagudi. Near Kottagudi, the Kundala Valley Railway line's Topslip railway station is present at a distance of 5 km. This railway line has never been laid.

The current railway line alignment between Theni railway station to Bodinayakkanur railway station follows the same alignment of the old railway line alignment which was surveyed during 1910 between Theni to Kottagudi branch railway line. The new railway line is constructed from Theni to Madurai Junction later in 1928 as Madurai – Bodinayakkanur branch line, now this line is exist and is currently runs in broad gauge and now its Electrified station .

== Location and layout ==
The railway station is located off the Railway Station Road in Suburaj Nagar, Bodinayakkanur. The nearest bus depot is located in Bodinayakkanur while the nearest airport is Madurai Airport, situated 87 kilometres (54 mi) away in Madurai.

== Lines ==
The station is the terminus of Madurai–Bodinayakkanur line. Currently it is converted from metre gauge to broad gauge. The metre-gauge tracks have already been removed.
