= Madurai Junction railway station =

Principal railway station of Madurai

Madurai Junction மதுரை சந்திப்பு
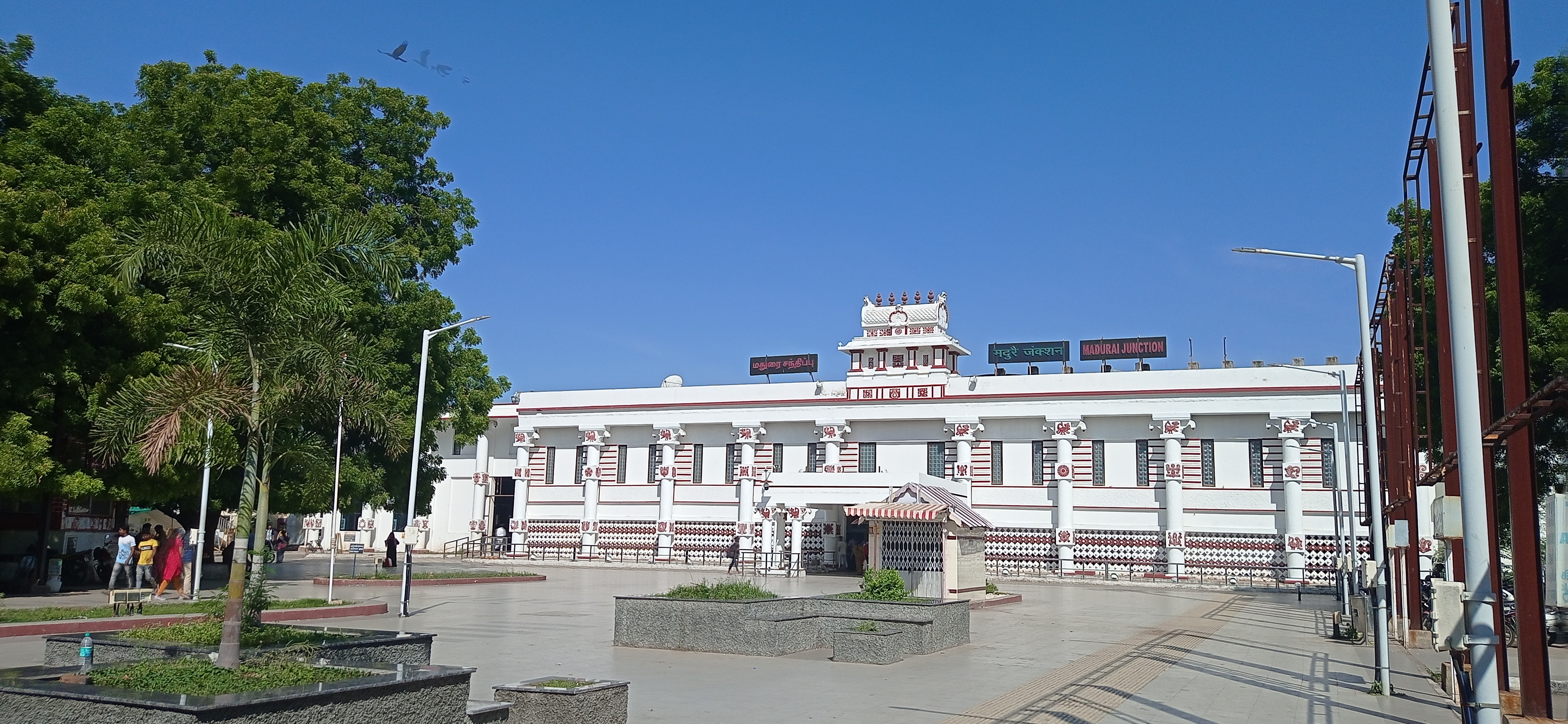
- Main entrance of the station

General information
- Location: West Veli Street, Madurai, Tamil Nadu; India
- Coordinates: 9°55′12″N 78°6′37″E
- System: Indian Railways station
- Owner: Southern Railway zone of the Indian Railways
- Operator: Indian Railways
- Lines: Madurai–Chennai Egmore; Madurai–Kanyakumari; Madurai–Bodinayakkanur; Madurai–Rameswaram; Madurai Junction–Thoothukudi (under construction ) Madurai–Melur–Tirupattur–Karaikudi section (under survey)
- Platforms: 7
- Tracks: 11
- Train operators: Indian Railways
- Bus operators: TNSTC MADURAI(MTC)
- Connections: Taxi stand, Auto rickshaw stand, Railway Junction Bus Stop

Construction
- Structure type: Standard (on ground station)
- Depth: 2,000 m (6,600 ft)
- Platform levels: 2
- Parking: Available
- Cycle facilities: Available

Other information
- Status: Functioning
- Station code: MDU
- Zone(s): Southern Railway
- Division(s): Madurai
- Fare zone: Southern Railway Zone

History
- Opened: 1875; 151 years ago
- Closed: 2023
- Rebuilt: 1999; 27 years ago (from Meter Gauge to Broad Gauge)
- Former names: Madras and Southern Mahratta Railway

Passengers
- 2022–23: 6,701,350 (per year); 18,360 (per day) ▲250% (-)
- Rank: 2
Track layout
Location
- Location within Tamil Nadu
- Interactive map

Madurai Junction railway station (station code: MDU) is an NSG-2 category Indian railway station in Madurai railway division of Southern Railway zone. It serves the city of Madurai, located in Madurai district of the Indian state of Tamil Nadu.

It connects with Manamadurai Junction in South-East, Virudhunagar Junction in South, Bodinayakanur (Theni) in West and Dindigul Junction in North-West.

== Projects and development ==
It is one of the 73 stations in Tamil Nadu to be named for upgradation under Amrit Bharat Station Scheme of Indian Railways.

== Performance and earnings ==
For the FY 2022–23, the annual earnings of the station was ₹1,866,183,588 (US$19 million) and daily earnings was ₹5,112,832 (US$53,000). For the same financial year, the annual passenger count was 6,701,350 and daily count was 18,360. While, the footfall per day was recorded as 38,131.

== Railway lines ==
Line No.	Towards
1	Dindigul Junction (north)
2	Virudhunagar Junction (south)
3	Bodinayakkanur (west)
4	Manamadurai Junction (south-east)

== New rail line proposal ==
Madurai–Melur–Tirupattur–Karaikudi new BG line: As sanctioned by Railway Board in the year 2007–08, Survey was taken & the report has been submitted to Railway Board on 29 July 2008. Then updating survey was sanctioned in the year 2013–14 and the survey report was submitted to Railway board on 27 November 2014. Railway Board has shelved the proposal at present. Decision of Railway Board is awaited.
