= Potheri railway station =

Railway station in Tamil Nadu, India

Potheri
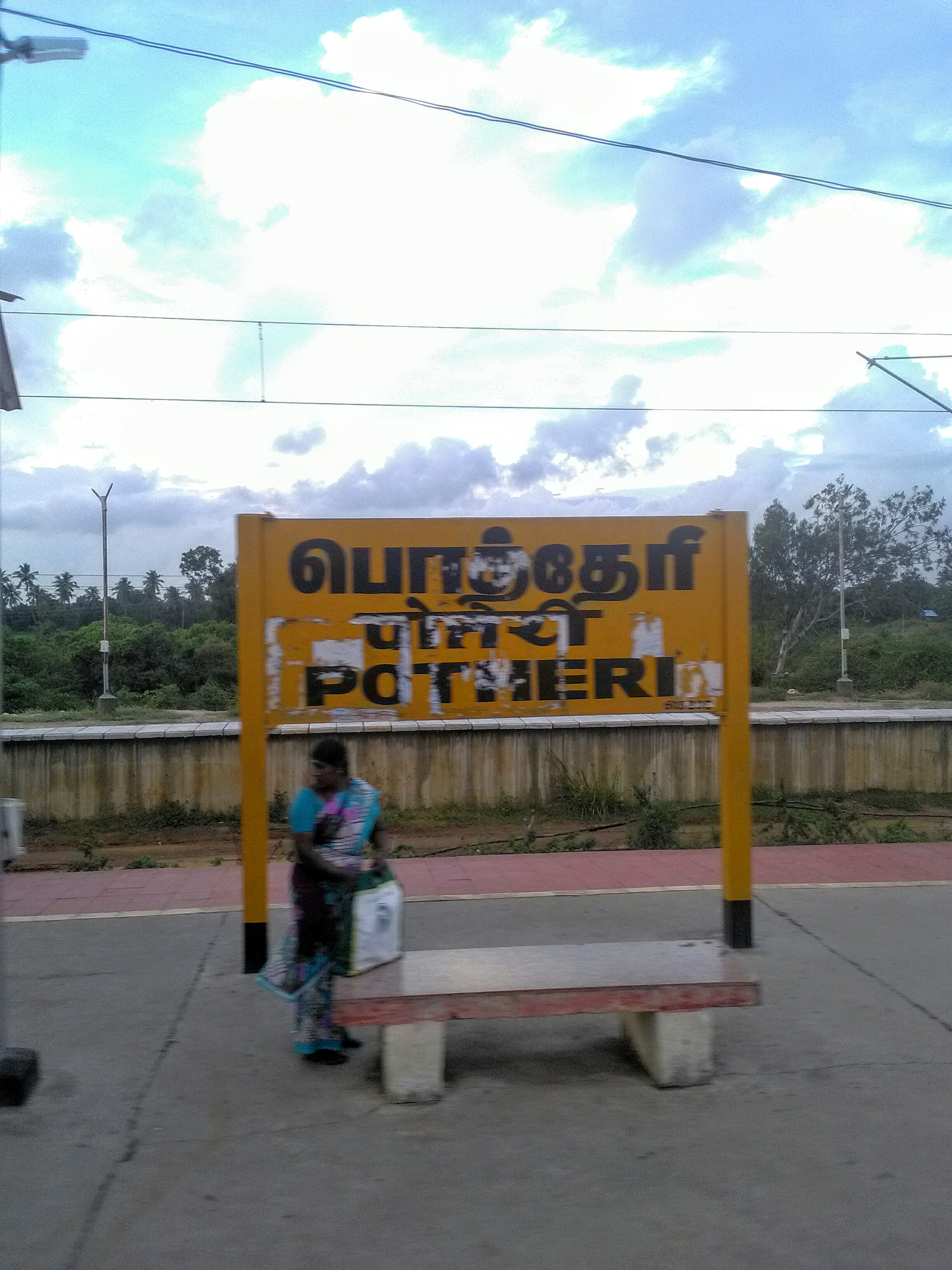
- Name board of Potheri railway station

General information
- Location: National Highway 32, Potheri, Chennai Metro, Chengalpattu district, Tamil Nadu, India
- Coordinates: 12°49′18″N 80°2′14″E
- Elevation: 45 metres (148 ft)
- System: Indian Railways and Chennai Suburban Railway station
- Owner: Ministry of Railways, Indian Railways
- Lines: South and South West lines of Chennai Suburban Railway
- Platforms: 3
- Tracks: 3

Construction
- Structure type: Standard on-ground station
- Parking: Not Available

Other information
- Station code: POTI
- Fare zone: Southern Railways

History
- Electrified: 9 January 1965; 61 years ago
- Former names: South Indian Railway

Services
Preceding station	Chennai Suburban	Following station
Guduvancheri towards Tambaram, Chennai Egmore or Chennai Beach	South Line	Kattangulathur towards Chengalpattu Junction or Villupuram Junction
Route map
Chennai Beach — Villupuram
Location

Potheri railway station is one of the railway stations of the Chennai Beach–Chengalpattu section of the Chennai Suburban Railway Network. It serves the neighbourhood of Potheri, a suburb of Chennai. It is situated at a distance of 43 km (27 mi) from Chennai Beach junction and is located on NH 45 in Potheri, with an elevation of 45 m (148 ft) above sea level. The station also serves the Livestock Research Station, Kattupakkam and SRM Institute of Science and Technology.

== History ==
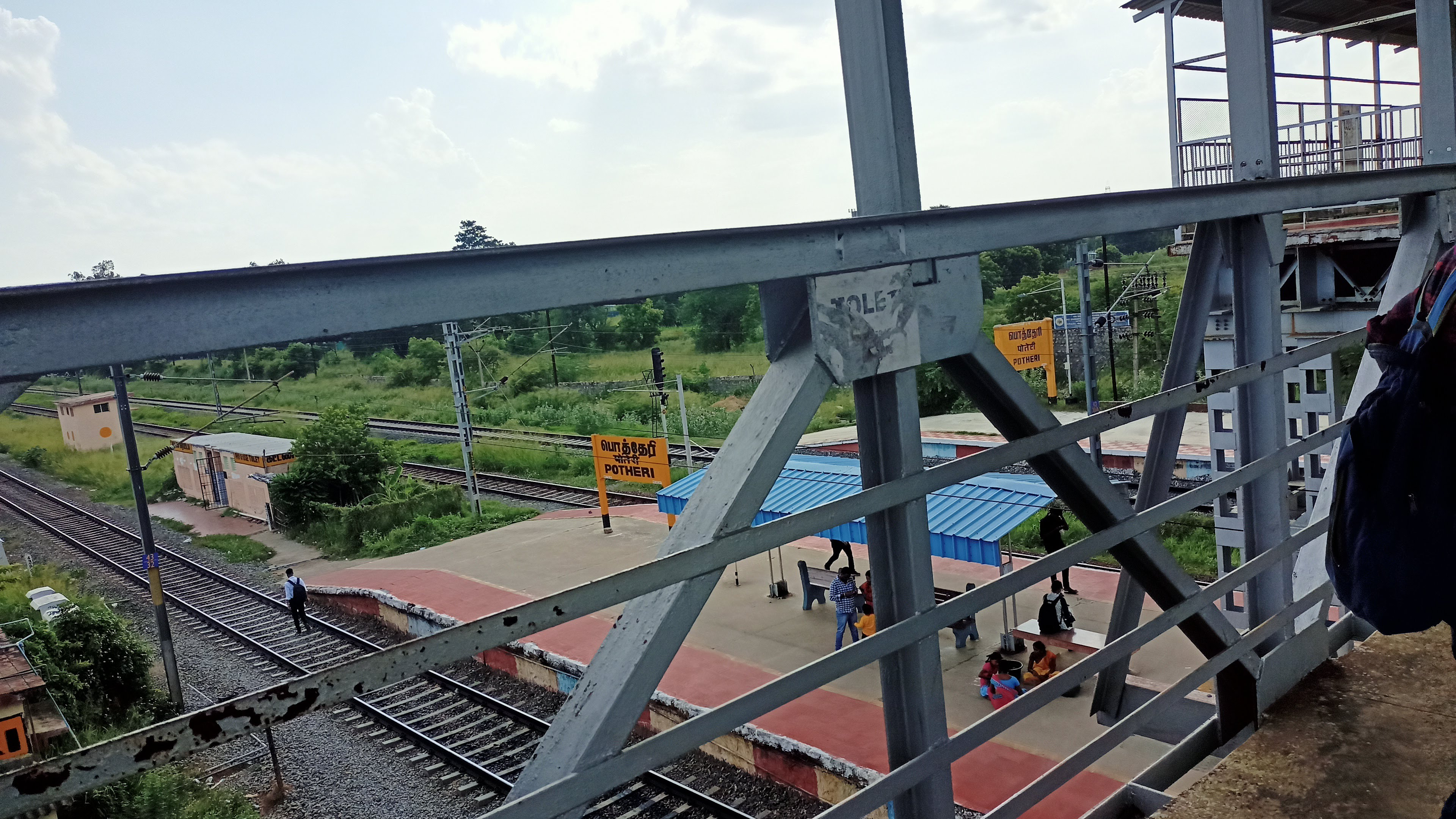
Potheri railway station top view from walkbridge

The lines at the station were electrified on 9 January 1965, with the electrification of the Tambaram—Chengalpattu section.

== The station ==
=== Platforms ===
There are a total of 3 platforms and 3 tracks. The platforms are connected by foot overbridge. These platforms are built to accumulate 24 coaches express train. The platforms are equipped with modern facility like display board of arrival and departure of trains.

=== Station layout ===
G	Street level	Exit/Entrance & ticket counter
P	FOB, Side platform | Doors will open on the left
P	Platform 3	Towards → Tambaram / Chennai Beach; Next Station: Guduvancheri
P	Platform 2	Towards → Tambaram / Chennai Beach
P	FOB, Island platform | P1 Doors will open on the left | P1 & P2 - (Express Lines)
P	Platform 1	Towards ← Chengalpattu Jn / Villuppuram Jn; Next Station: Kattankulathur
G	Street level	Exit/Entrance & ticket counter

== See also ==
- Chennai Suburban Railway
