= Singaperumal Koil railway station =

Railway station in Tamil Nadu, India

Singaperumal Koil
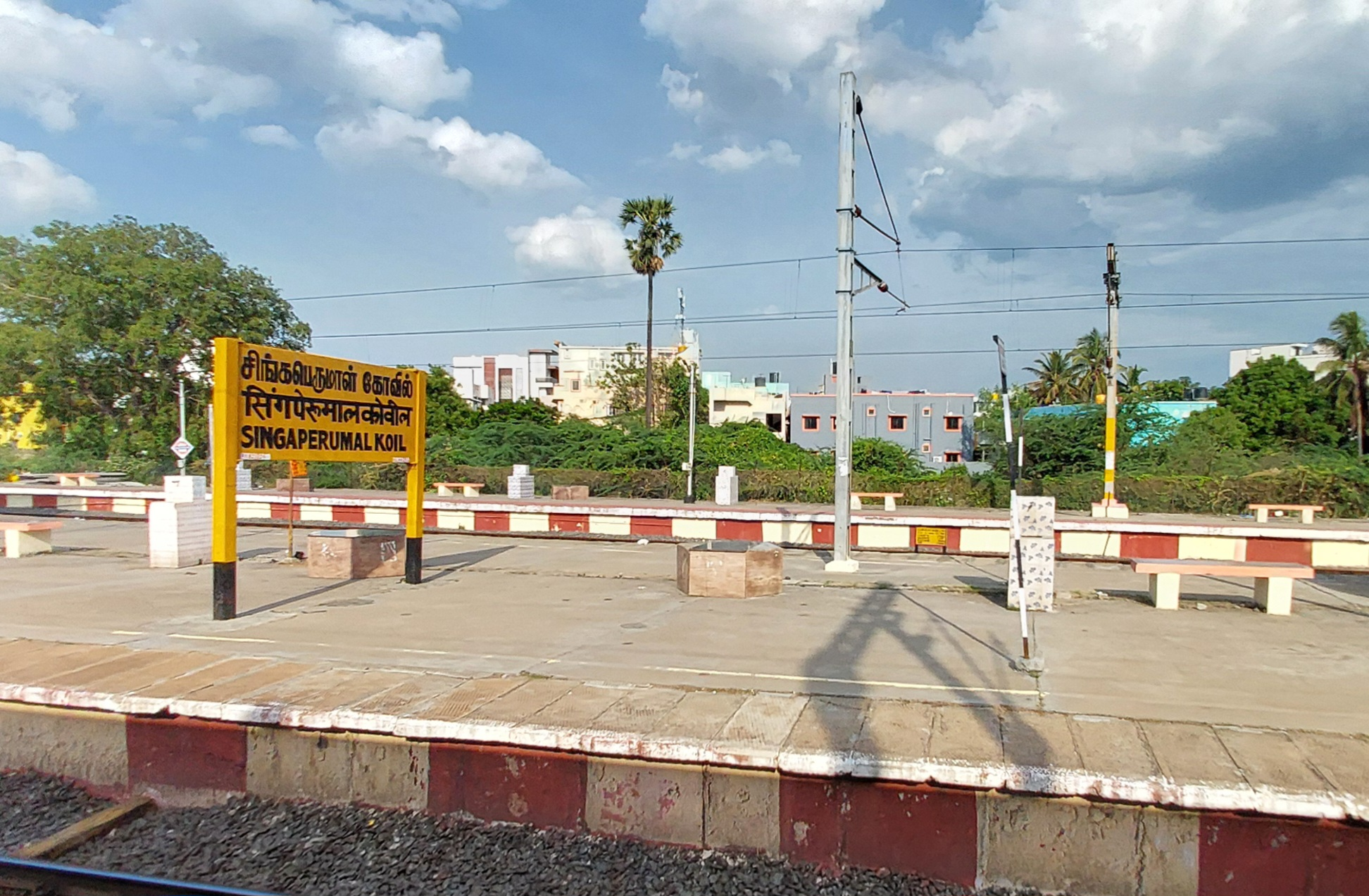
- Singaperumal Koil railway station

General information
- Location: National Highway 32, Singaperumal Koil, Chennai, Kanchipuram district, Tamil Nadu; India
- Coordinates: 12°45′41″N 79°59′58″E
- System: Indian Railways and Chennai Suburban Railway station
- Owner: Ministry of Railways, Indian Railways
- Lines: South and South West lines of Chennai Suburban Railway
- Platforms: 5
- Tracks: 5

Construction
- Structure type: Standard on-ground station
- Parking: Available

Other information
- Station code: SKL
- Fare zone: Southern Railways

History
- Electrified: 9 January 1965
- Former names: South Indian Railway

Services
Preceding station	Chennai Suburban	Following station
Maraimalai Nagar Kamarajar towards Tambaram or Chennai Beach	South Line	Paranur towards Chengalpattu Junction or Villupuram Junction
Route map
Chennai Beach — Villupuram
Location

Singaperumal Koil railway station (station code: SKL) is an NSG–4 category Indian railway station in Chennai railway division of Southern Railway zone. It is one of the railway stations of the Chennai Beach–Chengalpattu section of the Chennai Suburban Railway Network. It serves the neighbourhood of Singaperumal Koil, a suburb of Chennai. It is situated at a distance of 51 km from Chennai Beach junction and is located on NH 45 in Singaperumal Koil, with an elevation of 45 m above sea level.

== History ==
The lines at the station were electrified on 9 January 1965, with the electrification of the Tambaram—Chengalpattu section.

== The station ==
=== Platforms ===
There are a total of 5 platforms and 5 tracks. The platforms are connected by foot overbridge. These platforms are built to accumulate 24 coaches express train. The platforms are equipped with modern facility like display board of arrival and departure of trains.

=== Station layout ===
G	Street level	Exit/Entrance & ticket counter
P	Platform 5	Trains toward Chengalpattu(Evening) and Chennai Beach (Evening)*
P	FOB, Island platform | P4 Doors will open on the right | P5 Doors will open in left(Evening) and right(Morning)
P	Platform 4	Towards → Tambaram / Chennai Beach; Next Station: Maraimalai Nagar Kamarajar
P	Platform 3	Towards → Tambaram / Chennai Beach
P	FOB, Island platform | P2 & P3 (Express Lines) | P2 Doors will open on the right | P3 Doors will open on the right
P	Platform 2	Towards ← Chengalpattu Junction / Villuppuram Jn
P	Platform 1	Not in Operation
P	FOB, Side platform | P1 (Not in operation)
G	Street level	Exit/Entrance & ticket counter

== Connectivity ==
The level crossing no. LC47 at the station is being replaced by an overbridge with a roundabout on top at a cost of ₹ 520 million. Work commenced in 2012.

== See also ==
- Chennai Suburban Railway
