= Kattankulathur railway station =

Railway station in Tamil Nadu, India

Kattangulathur
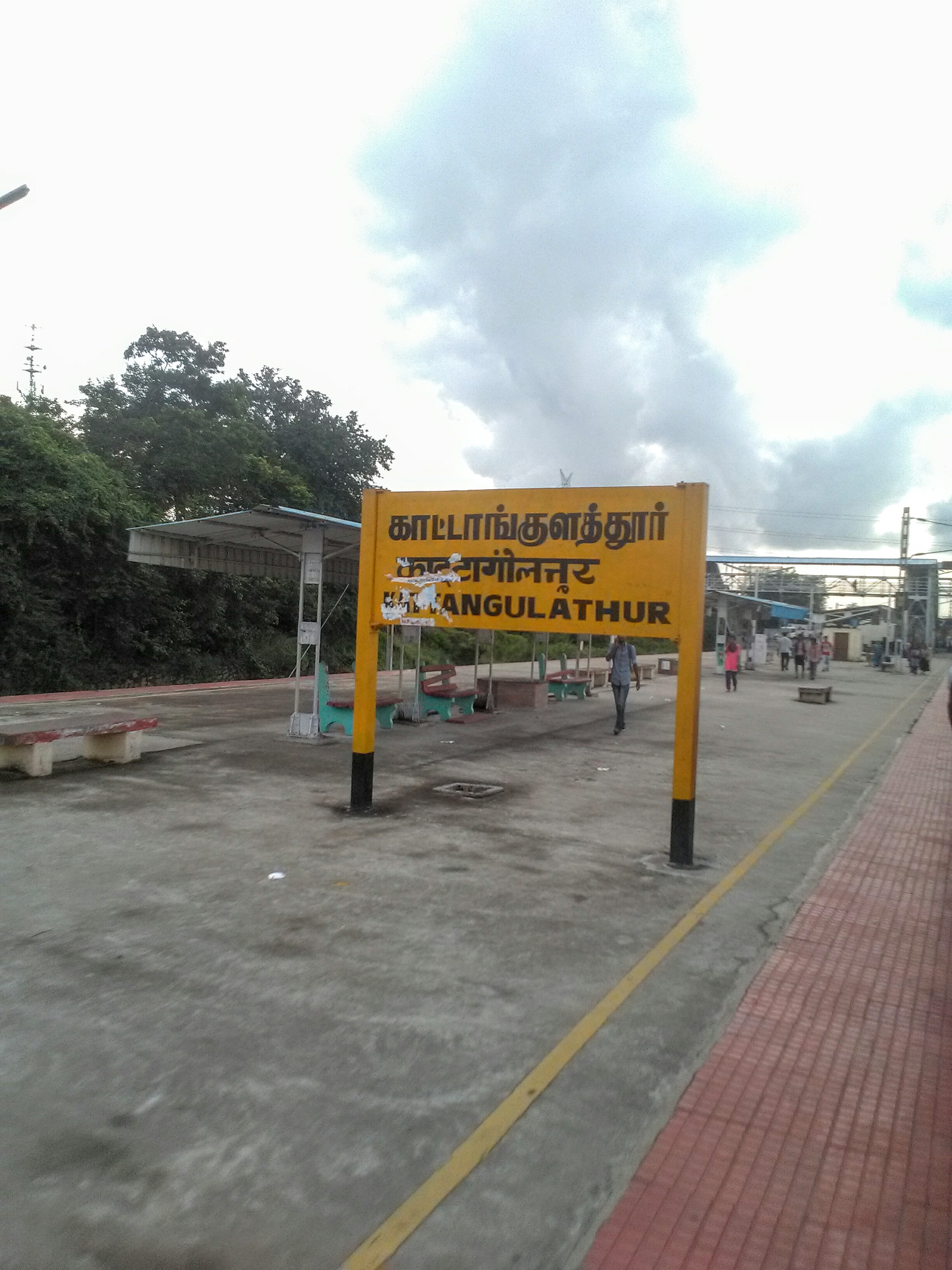

General information
- Location: National Highway 32, Kattankulathur, Maraimalai Nagar, Chengalpattu district, Tamil Nadu; India
- Coordinates: 12.8057°N 80.0265°E
- System: Indian Railways and Chennai Suburban Railway station
- Owner: Ministry of Railways, Indian Railways
- Lines: South and South West lines of Chennai Suburban Railway
- Platforms: 4
- Tracks: 4

Construction
- Structure type: Standard on-ground station
- Parking: Available

Other information
- Station code: CTM
- Fare zone: Southern Railways

History
- Electrified: 9 January 1965
- Former names: South Indian Railway

Services
Preceding station	Chennai Suburban	Following station
Potheri towards Tambaram or Chennai Beach	South Line	Maraimalai Nagar Kamarajar towards Chengalpattu Junction or Villupuram Junction
Route map
Chennai Beach — Villupuram
Location

Kattangulathur railway station (station code: CTM) is an NSG–5 category Indian railway station in Chennai railway division of Southern Railway zone. It is one of the railway stations of the Chennai Beach–Chengalpattu section of the Chennai Suburban Railway Network. It serves the neighbourhood of Kattankulathur, a suburb of Chennai. It is situated at a distance of 45 km from Chennai Beach junction and is located on NH 32 in Kattankulathur, with an elevation of 51 m above sea level.

== History ==
The lines at the station were electrified on 9 January 1965, with the electrification of the Tambaram—Chengalpattu section.

== The station ==
=== Platforms ===
There are a total of 4 platforms and 4 tracks. The platforms are connected by foot overbridge. These platforms are built to accumulate 24 coaches express train. The platforms are equipped with modern facility like display board of arrival and departure of trains.

=== Station layout ===
G	Street level	Exit/Entrance & ticket counter
P	Platform 4	Towards → Tambaram / Chennai Beach; Next Station: Potheri
P	FOB, Island platform | P4 Doors will open on the left | P3 Doors will open on the right | P3 - Express Line
P	Platform 3	Towards → Tambaram / Chennai Beach; Next Station: Potheri
P	Platform 2	Towards ← Chengalpattu Jn / Villuppuram Jn; Next Station: Maraimalai Nagar Kamarajar
P	FOB, Island platform | P1 Doors will open on the left | P2 Doors will open on the right | P2 - Express Line
P	Platform 1	Towards ← Chengalpattu Jn / Villuppuram Jn; Next Station: Maraimalai Nagar Kamarajar
G	Street level	Exit/Entrance & ticket counter

== See also ==
- Chennai Suburban Railway
