= Tambaram–Tiruchchirappalli Express =

Train in India

Tambaram - Tiruchchirappalli Express

Overview
- Service type: Express
- Status: Active
- Locale: Tamil Nadu
- First service: 1 March 2026; 40 days ago
- Current operator: Southern Railway (SR)

Route
- Termini: Tambaram (TBM); Tiruchchirappalli Junction (TPJ)
- Stops: 15
- Distance travelled: 377 km (234 mi)
- Average journey time: 7h 10m
- Service frequency: 5 days
- Train number: 16807 / 16808

On-board services
- Classes: General Unreserved, Chair Car Class, AC Chair Class
- Seating arrangements: Yes
- Sleeping arrangements: No
- Catering facilities: On-board catering
- Observation facilities: Large windows
- Baggage facilities: No
- Other facilities: Below the seats

Technical
- Rolling stock: LHB coach
- Track gauge: 1,676 mm (5 ft 6 in)
- Electrification: 25 kV 50 Hz AC Overhead line
- Operating speed: 130 km/h (81 mph) maximum, 53 km/h (33 mph) average including halts.
- Track owner: Indian Railways

The 16807 / 16808 Tambaram–Tiruchchirappalli Intercity Express is an express train belonging to Southern Railway zone that runs between Tambaram and Tiruchchirappalli Junction in Tamil Nadu, India.

It operates as train number 16807 from Tambaram to Tiruchchirappalli Junction and as train number 16808 in the reverse direction, serving the state of Tamil Nadu.

== Services ==
• 16807/ Tambaram–Tiruchchirappalli Express has an average speed of 53 km/h and covers 377 km in 7h 10m.

• 16808/ Tiruchchirappalli–Tambaram Express has an average speed of 54 km/h and covers 377 km in 6h 55m.

== Routes and halts ==
The Important Halts of the train are :

● Tambaram

● Chengalpattu Junction

● Melmaruvathur

● Tindivanam

● Villupuram Junction

● Panruti

● Thirupathiripuliyur

● Chidambaram

● Sirkazhi

● Mayiladuthurai Junction

● Kumbakonam

● Papanasam

● Thanjavur Junction

● Thiruverumbur

● Tiruchchirappalli Junction

== Schedule ==
• 16807 - 3:30 PM (Sunday, Monday, Thursday, Friday & Saturday) [Tambaram]

• 16808 - 5:35 AM (Sunday, Monday, Thursday, Friday & Saturday) [Tiruchchirappalli Junction]

== Coach composition ==
1. General Unreserved - 6
2. Chair Car - 8
3. AC Chair Car - 2

== Traction ==
As the entire route is fully electrified it is hauled by a Royapuram Loco Shed-based WAP-7 electric locomotive from Tambaram to Tiruchchirappalli Junction and vice versa.

== Rake share ==
The train has no rake Reversal or rake share.

== See also ==
Trains from Tambaram :

1. Tambaram–Nagercoil Antyodaya Express
2. Tambaram–Rameswaram Express
3. New Tinsukia–Tambaram Express
4. Nagaon Express
5. Tambaram–Jasidih Ratna Express

Trains from Tiruchchirappalli Junction :

1. Tiruchirappalli–Howrah Superfast Express
2. Sri Ganganagar–Tiruchirappalli Humsafar Express
3. Tiruchirappalli–Thiruvananthapuram Intercity Express
4. Tiruchirappalli–Mayiladuthurai Express
5. Cholan Express

== Notes ==
a. Runs 5 day in a week with both directions.
