= Guduvancheri railway station =

Railway station in Tamil Nadu, India

Guduvancheri
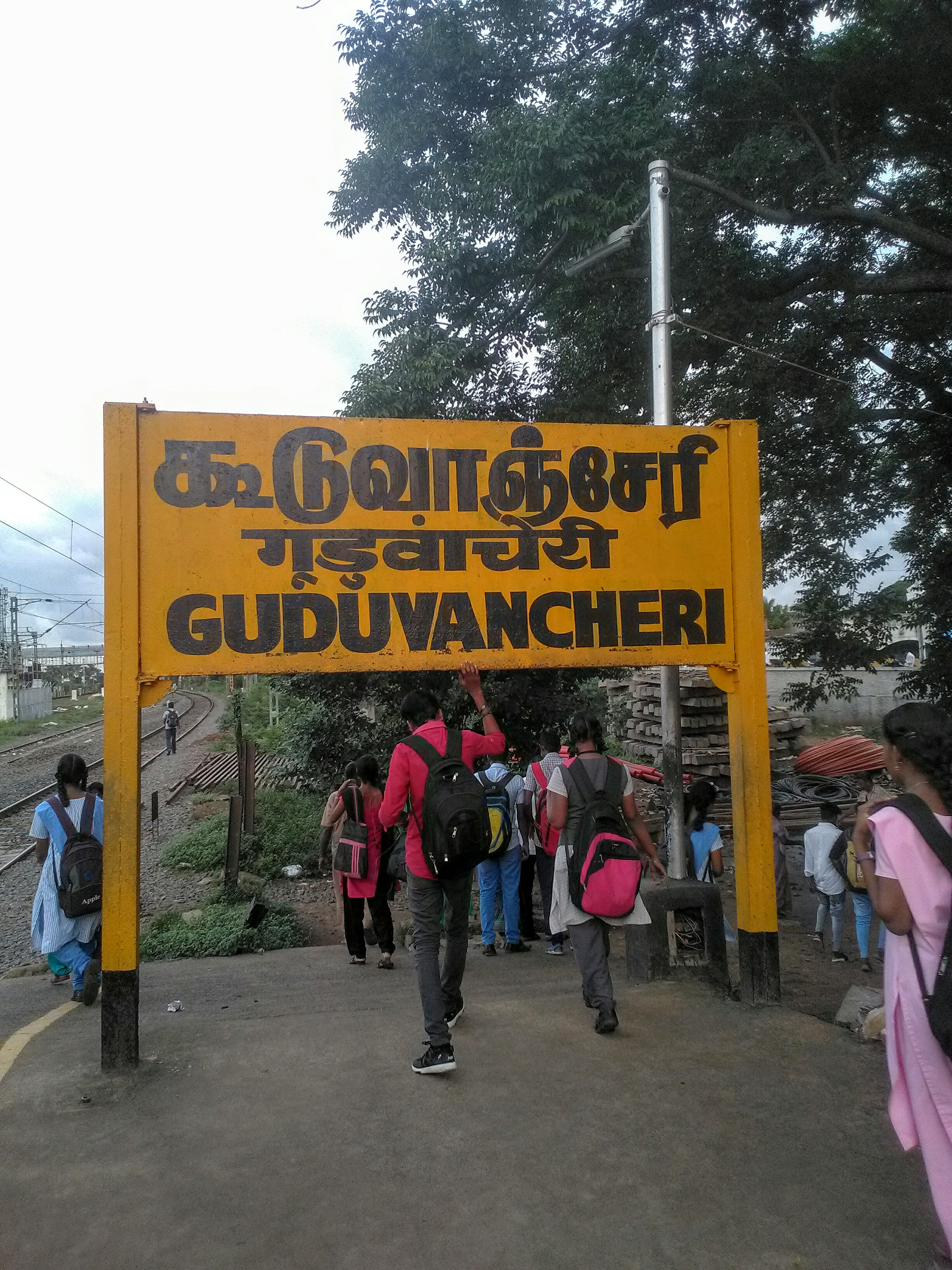

General information
- Location: National Highway 32, Guduvancheri, Chennai, Chengalpattu taluk, Chengalpattu district, Tamil Nadu, India
- Coordinates: 12°50′42″N 80°3′25″E
- System: Indian Railways and Chennai Suburban Railway station
- Owner: Ministry of Railways, Indian Railways
- Lines: South and South West lines of Chennai Suburban Railway
- Platforms: 5
- Tracks: 5

Construction
- Structure type: Standard on-ground station
- Parking: Available

Other information
- Station code: GI
- Fare zone: Southern Railways

History
- Electrified: 9 January 1965
- Former names: South Indian Railway

Services
Preceding station	Chennai Suburban	Following station
Urapakkam towards Tambaram or Chennai Beach	South Line	Potheri towards Chengalpattu Junction or Villupuram Junction
Route map
Chennai Beach — Villupuram
Location

Guduvancheri railway station (station code: GI) is an NSG–3 category Indian railway station in Chennai railway division of the Southern Railway zone. It is one of the railway stations of the Chennai Beach–Chengalpattu section of the Chennai Suburban Railway Network. It serves the town of Guduvancheri, a suburb of the Chennai metropolitan area in Chengalpattu district.It is situated at a distance of 40 km (25 mi) from Chennai Beach junction and is located on NH 45 in Guduvancheri, with an elevation of 36 m (118 ft) above sea level.

== History ==
The lines at the station were electrified on 9 January 1965, with the electrification of the Tambaram—Chengalpattu section.

== The station ==
=== Platforms ===
There are a total of 5 platforms and 5 tracks. The platforms are connected by foot overbridge. These platforms are built to accumulate 24 coaches express train. The platforms are equipped with modern facility like display board of arrival and departure of trains.

=== Station layout ===
P	Platform 5	(Not in Operation)
P	FOB, Island platform | P4 Doors will open on the left | P5 (Not in Operation)
P	Platform 4	Towards → Tambaram / Chennai Beach; Next Station: Urapakkam
P	Platform 3	Towards → Tambaram / Chennai Beach
P	FOB, Island platform | P3 (Express Line) | P2 Doors will open on the right | P3 Doors will open on the right
P	Platform 2	Towards ← Chengalpattu Junction / Villuppuram Jn
P	Platform 1	Towards ← Chengalpattu Junction / Villuppuram Jn; Next Station: Potheri
P	FOB, Side platform | P1 (Express Line) | P1 Doors will open on the left
G	Street level	Exit/Entrance & ticket counter

== Projects and development ==
It is one of the 73 stations in Tamil Nadu to be named for upgradation under Amrit Bharat Station Scheme of Indian Railways.

== See also ==
- Chennai Suburban Railway
