= Maraimalai Nagar Kamarajar railway station =

Railway station in Tamil Nadu, India

Maraimalai Nagar - Kamarajar
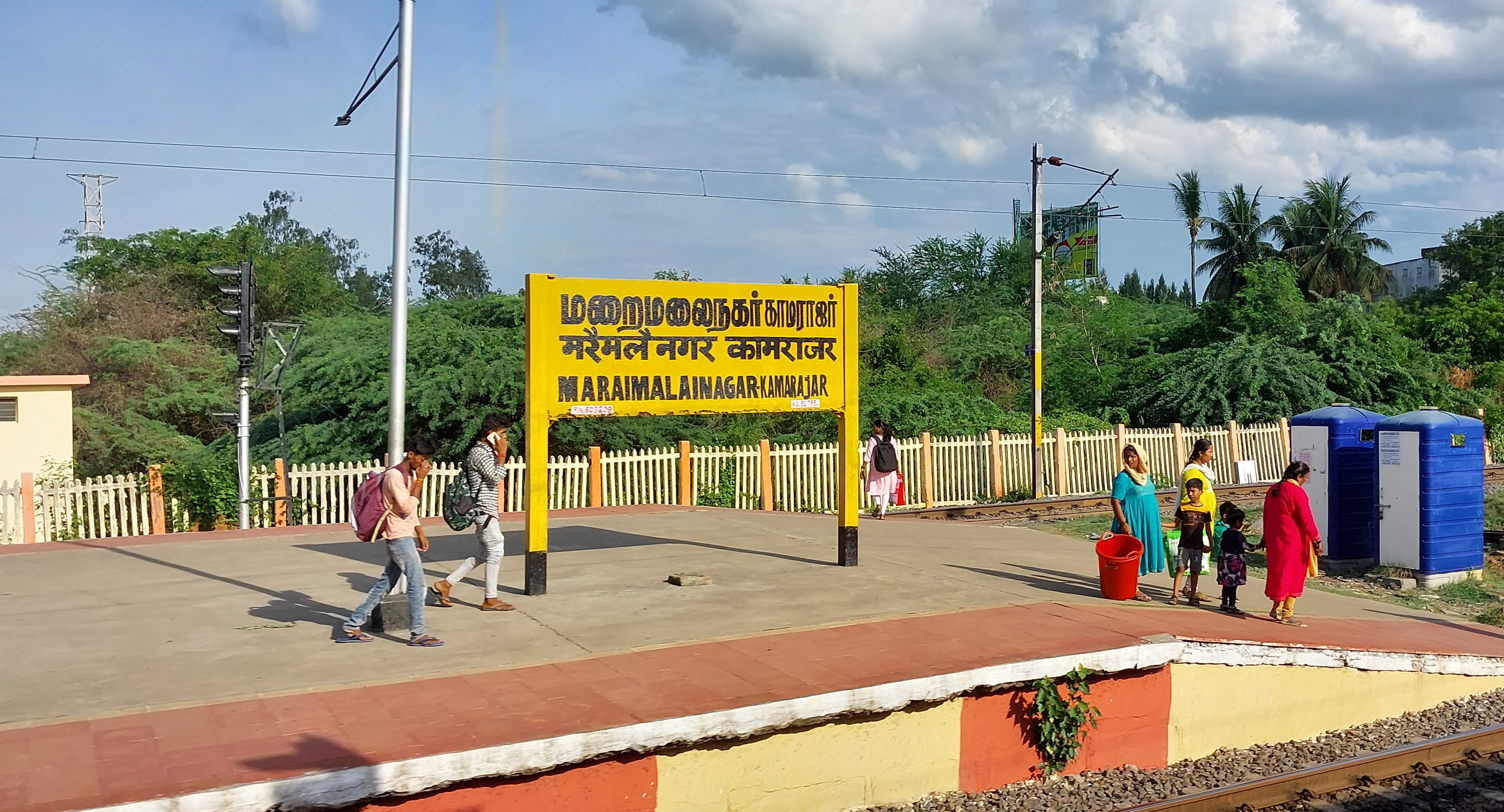

General information
- Location: National Highway 32, Maraimalai Nagar, Chennai, Chengalpattu taluk, Chengalpattu district, Tamil Nadu; India
- Coordinates: 12°47′49″N 80°1′12″E
- System: Indian Railways and Chennai Suburban Railway station
- Owner: Ministry of Railways, Indian Railways
- Lines: South and South West lines of Chennai Suburban Railway
- Platforms: 3
- Tracks: 3

Construction
- Structure type: Standard on-ground station
- Parking: Available

Other information
- Station code: MMNK
- Fare zone: Southern Railways

History
- Electrified: 9 January 1965
- Former names: South Indian Railway

Services
Preceding station	Chennai Suburban	Following station
Kattangulathur towards Tambaram or Chennai Beach	South Line	Singaperumal Koil towards Chengalpattu Junction or Villupuram Junction
Route map
Chennai Beach — Villupuram
Location

Maraimalai Nagar - Kamarajar railway station (station code: MMNK) is one of the railway stations of the Chennai Beach–Chengalpattu section of the Chennai Suburban Railway. It serves the town of Maraimalai Nagar, a suburb of the Chennai Metropolitan Area located in Chengalpattu district. It is situated at a distance of 47 km from Chennai Beach junction and is located on NH 45 in Maraimalai Nagar, with an elevation of 55 m above sea level. The Government of India renamed the station after the INC(O) founder and the former Chief Minister of Tamil Nadu K. Kamaraj.

The station has three platforms, of which two are used for suburban rail. All three platforms may accommodate longer trains running between locations such as Chennai and Trichy.

== History ==
The lines at the station were electrified on 9 January 1965, with the electrification of the Tambaram–Chengalpattu section.

== See also ==
- Chennai Suburban Railway
