= Guindy railway station =

Railway station in Chennai, India

Guindy
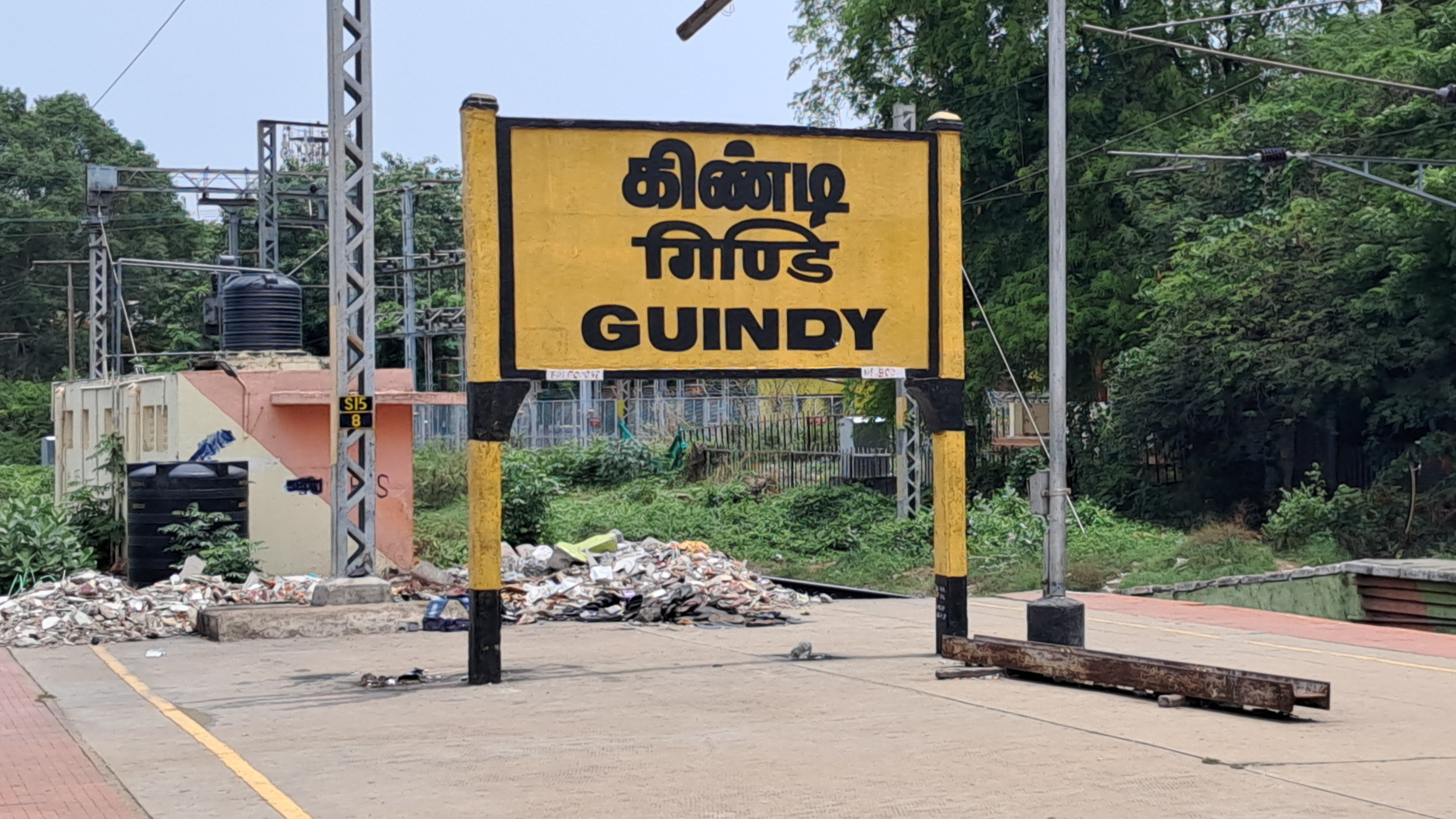
- Guindy railway station as of June 2025

General information
- Location: Anna Salai, Race View Colony, SIDCO Industrial Estate, Chennai, Tamil Nadu, India
- Coordinates: 13°0′31″N 80°12′47″E
- System: Indian Railways and Chennai Suburban Railway station
- Owner: Ministry of Railways, Indian Railways
- Lines: South and South West lines of Chennai Suburban Railway
- Platforms: 4
- Tracks: 4
- Connections: Blue Line Guindy

Construction
- Structure type: Standard on-ground station
- Parking: Available

Other information
- Station code: GDY
- Fare zone: Southern Railways

History
- Former names: South Indian Railway

Services
Preceding station	Chennai Suburban	Following station
Saidapet towards Chennai Beach	South Line	St. Thomas Mount towards Tambaram, Chengalpattu Junction or Villupuram Junction
Route map
Chennai Beach — Villupuram
Location

Guindy railway station (station code: GDY) is one of the railway stations of the Chennai Beach–Chengalpattu section of the Chennai Suburban Railway Network. It serves the neighbourhood of Guindy, a suburb of Chennai. It is located at about 14 km from Chennai Beach terminus and is situated at NH 45 in Anna Salai, with an elevation of 12 m above sea level.

It is located next to the Guindy metro station and the Guindy bus stop, making the area well-connected through public transit and easier for commuters to travel to and from.

== History ==
With the completion of track-lying work of the Chennai Beach–Tambaram section of the Chennai Suburban Railway Network in March 1931, which began in 1928, the suburban services were started on 11 May 1931 between Beach and Tambaram, and the tracks were electrified on 15 November 1931, with the first MG EMU services running on 1.5 kV DC. The section was converted to 25 kV AC traction on 15 January 1967.

== The station ==
=== Platforms ===
There are a total of 4 platforms and 4 tracks. The platforms are connected by foot overbridge. These platforms are built to accumulate 24 coaches express train. The platforms are equipped with modern facility like display board of arrival and departure of trains.

=== Station layout ===
G	Street level	Exit/Entrance & ticket counter
P1	FOB, Side platform | Doors will open on the left
P1	Platform 1	Towards → Chennai Beach; Next Station: Saidapet
P1	FOB, Island platform | P1 Doors will open on the left/right | P2 Doors will open on the right
P1	Platform 2	Towards ← Tambaram / Chengalpattu Jn / Villuppuram Jn; Next Station: St. Thomas Mount
P1	Platform 3	Towards → Chennai Egmore
P1	FOB, Island platform | P3 and P4 | (Express Line)
P1	Platform 4	Towards ← Chengalpattu Junction
P1

== Performance and earnings ==
As of 2023, the station had a footfall of 60,000 passengers a day.

== Projects and development ==
The task of upgrading of the station was taken up in 2023 under Indian Railway's "Amruth Bharath" scheme at a cost of ₹ 135 million.

The construction of a foot overbridge is currently being conducted to connect all the railway platforms to the adjacent Guindy metro station.

== See also ==
- Chennai Suburban Railway
- Railway stations in Chennai
