= Urapakkam railway station =

Indian railway station

Urappakkam
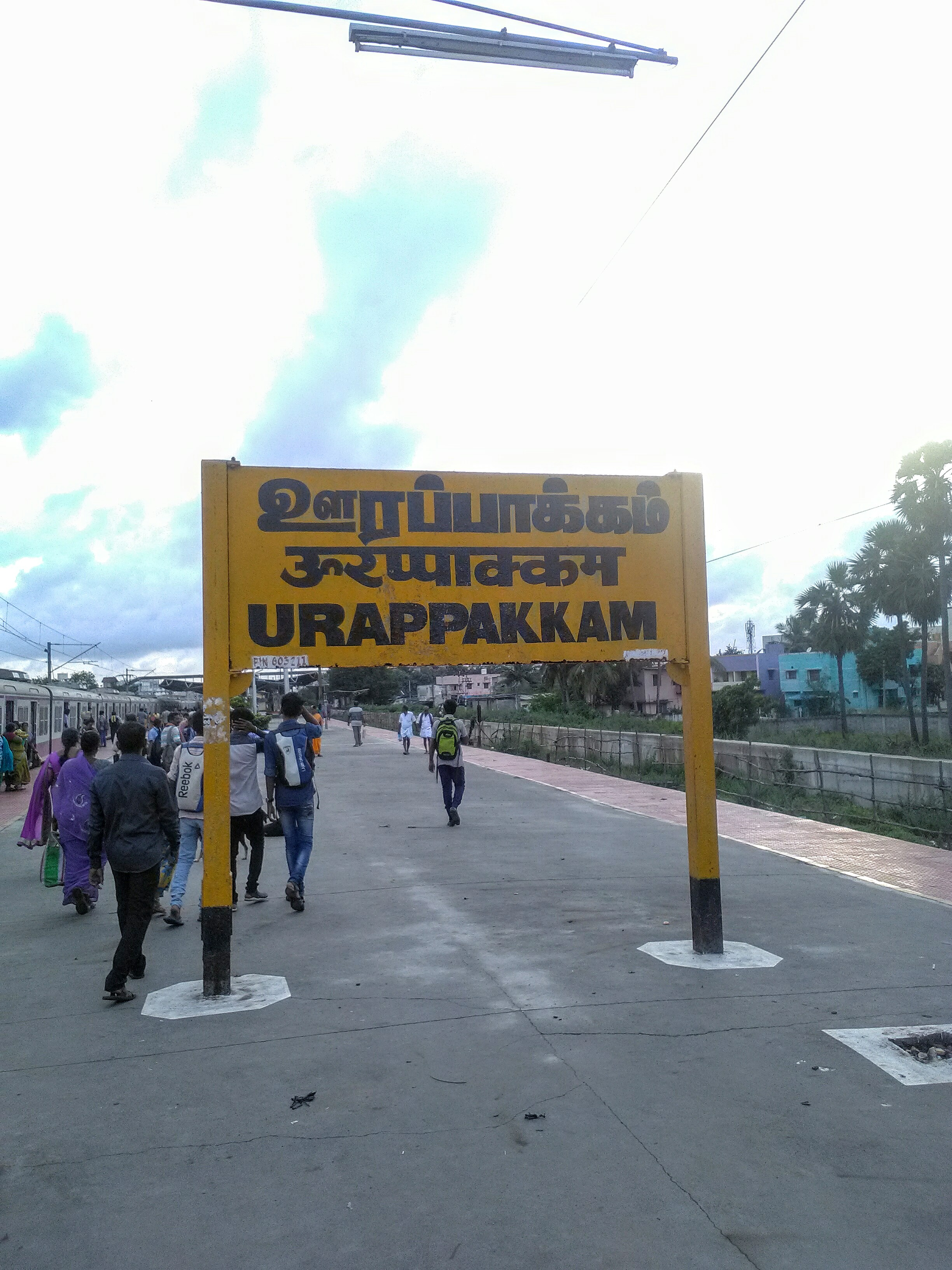
- Urapakkam railway station

General information
- Location: National Highway 32, Urapakkam, Chennai, Chengalpattu district, Tamil Nadu, India
- Coordinates: 12°52′4″N 80°4′20″E
- System: Indian Railways and Chennai Suburban Railway station
- Owner: Ministry of Railways, Indian Railways
- Lines: South and South West lines of Chennai Suburban Railway

Construction
- Structure type: Standard on-ground station
- Parking: Available

Other information
- Station code: UPM
- Fare zone: Southern Railways

History
- Electrified: 9 January 1965
- Former names: South Indian Railway

Services
Preceding station	Chennai Suburban	Following station
Kilambakkam towards Tambaram or Chennai Beach	South Line	Guduvancheri towards Chengalpattu Junction or Villupuram Junction
Route map
Chennai Beach — Villupuram
Location

Urapakkam railway station is one of the railway stations of the Chennai Beach–Chengalpattu section of the Chennai Suburban Railway Network. It serves the neighbourhood of Urapakkam, a suburb of Chennai. It is situated at a distance of 37 km (23 mi) from Chennai Beach junction and is located on NH 45 in Urapakkam, with an elevation of 29 m (95 ft) above sea level.

== History ==
The lines at the station were electrified on 9 January 1965, with the electrification of the Tambaram–Chengalpattu section.

== The station ==
=== Platforms ===
There are a total of 3 platforms and 3 tracks. The platforms are connected by foot overbridge. These platforms are built to accumulate 24 coaches express train. The platforms are equipped with modern facility like display board of arrival and departure of trains.

=== Station layout ===
G	Street level	Exit/Entrance & ticket counter
P	FOB, Side platform | Doors will open on the left
P	Platform 1	Towards → Tambaram / Chennai Beach; Next Station: Kilambakkam
P	Platform 2	Towards → Tambaram / Chennai Beach
P	FOB, Island platform | P3 Doors will open on the left | P2 & P3 - (Express Lines)
P	Platform 3	Towards ← Chengalpattu Jn / Villuppuram Jn; Next Station: Guduvancheri
G	Street level	Exit/Entrance & ticket counter

== Amenities at/near railway station ==
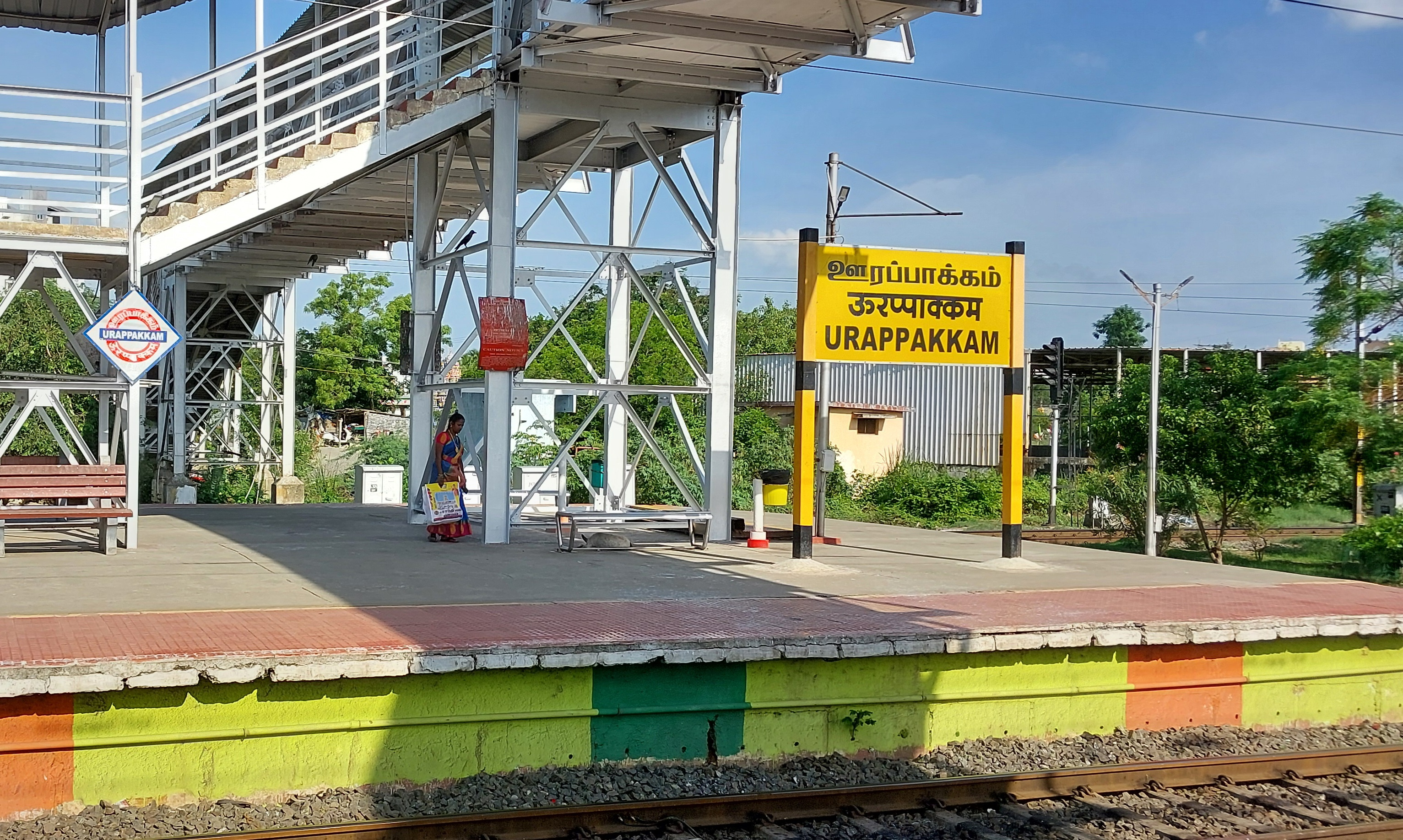
Urapakkam railway station

The railway station is accessible from Urapakkam east through the railway station road and through the west side using the railway foot overbridge.

The station has 2 broad-gauge tracks 3rd track under construction.

The metre-gauge track is not used and has already been dismantled.

There was a staffed railway crossing that has been closed since 2013 after construction of a railway overbridge.

The railway station is moving towards computerised ticket and the station master is available from 9 AM till 11 PM. There are no platform tickets at this railway station.

The Urapakkam railway station now offers return tickets to any station on the EMU line from Chengalpet to Chennai Fort. However, there are no tickets issued to MRTS (Mass Rapid Transit System) and CMRL (Chennai Metro Rail Limited).

== See also ==
- Chennai Suburban Railway
