= Tambaram–Villupuram Passenger =

Train in India

Tambaram–Viluppuram Passenger
Overview
- Service type: Passenger
- Current operator: Southern Railway

Route
- Termini: Tambaram (TBM); Viluppuram Junction (VM)
- Stops: 9
- Distance travelled: 134 km (83 mi)
- Average journey time: 3h
- Service frequency: Daily (Note: Runs seven days in a week for every direction.)
- Train number: 56059/56060

On-board services
- Class: Unreserved
- Seating arrangements: Yes
- Sleeping arrangements: No
- Catering facilities: No
- Entertainment facilities: No
- Baggage facilities: No

Technical
- Rolling stock: 2
- Track gauge: 5 ft 6 in (1,676 mm)
- Operating speed: 45 km/h (28 mph) average with halts

Tambaram–Viluppuram Passenger is a passenger train of the Indian Railways, which runs between Tambaram and Viluppuram Junction. It is currently being operated with 56059/56060 train numbers on a daily basis.

== Average speed and frequency ==
The 56059/Tambaram–Viluppuram Passenger runs with an average speed of 45 km/h and completes 134 km in 3h. The 56060/Viluppuram–Tambaram Passenger runs with an average speed of 42 km/h and completes 134 km in 3h 10m .

== Route and halts ==
The important halts of the train are:

- Tambaram
- Chengalpattu Junction
- Madurantakam
- Melmaruvattur
- Tindivanam
- Viluppuram Junction

== Coach composite ==
The train has standard ICF rakes with max speed of 110 kmph. The train consists of 10 coaches:

- 8 General Unreserved
- 2 Seating cum Luggage Rake

== Traction ==
Both trains are hauled by an Erode Loco Shed or Royapuram Loco Shed based WAP-4 electric locomotive from Tambaram to Viluppuram and vice versa.

== See also ==
- Tambaram railway station
- Viluppuram Junction railway station
