= Panruti railway station =

Railway station in Tamil Nadu, India

Panruti

General information
- Location: NH 45C, Thanjavur–Vikravanti National Highway, Panruti, Cuddalore, Tamil Nadu; India
- Coordinates: 11.7733°N 79.5546°E
- Elevation: 26 m (85 ft)
- System: Indian Railways station
- Owner: Indian Railways
- Operator: Southern Railway
- Line: Chennai Egmore–Thanjavur main line
- Platforms: 2
- Tracks: 4
- Connections: Bus stand, taxicab stand, auto rickshaw stand

Construction
- Structure type: Standard (on-ground station)
- Parking: Yes

Other information
- Status: Functioning
- Station code: PRT
- Zone(s): Southern Railway
- Division(s): Tiruchirapalli

History
- Electrified: 25 Kva 50 HZ
Location
- Location within India Location within Tamil Nadu

Panruti railway station (station code: PRT) is an NSG–5 category Indian railway station in Tiruchirappalli railway division of Southern Railway zone. It is a railway station serving the town of Panruti in Tamil Nadu, India.

== Location and layout ==
The railway station is located off the NH 45C, Thanjavur–Vikravanti National Highway of Panruti.

== Lines ==
The station is a focal point of the historic main line that connects Chennai with places like Thanjavur Junction, Nagapattinam Junction, Karaikkudi Junction, Thiruvarur Junction, Rameswaram etc.

- BG single line towards Chennai Egmore via Viluppuram Junction, Chengalpattu Junction and Tambaram.
- BG single line towards Tiruchirappalli Junction via Cuddalore Port Junction, Thanjavur Junction.
