= TMV =

TMV may refer to:

- Tobacco mosaic virus
- The Mars Volta
- Tindivanam railway station, Tamil Nadu, India (station code)
- Trondhjems mekaniske Værksted
- True market value
- Thermostatic mixing valve
- Tom Merritt, Molly Wood and Veronica Belmont; hosts of the podcast Buzz Out Loud
