= UPM =

UPM may refer to:

- Ultra-pure metal
- UPM (company), UPM-Kymmene Oyj, a pulp and paper company
- Union pour la méditerrannée, Mediterranean Community
- Union for a Popular Movement, opposition party of France
- Unit production manager, someone responsible for administration duties on a film
- Units per em
- Unix Programmers Manual
- Unlawful possession of marijuana
- User profile management
- The Unemployed Peoples' Movement in South Africa.
- Uganda Patriotic Movement - Defunct political party in Uganda.
- Upminster station, London, National Rail station code
- Urapakkam railway station, Chennai, India, Indian Railways station code

== Universities ==
- Universidad Politécnica de Madrid, a public university in Madrid, Spain
- Universidad Pontificia de México, Mexico City
- University of Putra Malaysia, a public research university in Selangor, Malaysia
- University of Petroleum and Minerals, a public university in Dhahran, Saudi Arabia
- University of the Philippines Manila, oldest of the eight constituent universities of the University of the Philippines System
- University of Pennsylvania Museum of Archaeology and Anthropology a museum at the University of Pennsylvania
