= Revatipura =

Revatipura may refer to:

- Reotipur, Uttar Pradesh
- Revathipuram, Tamil Nadu in Urapakkam
