= Tindivanam railway station =

Railway station in Tamil Nadu, India

Tindivanam
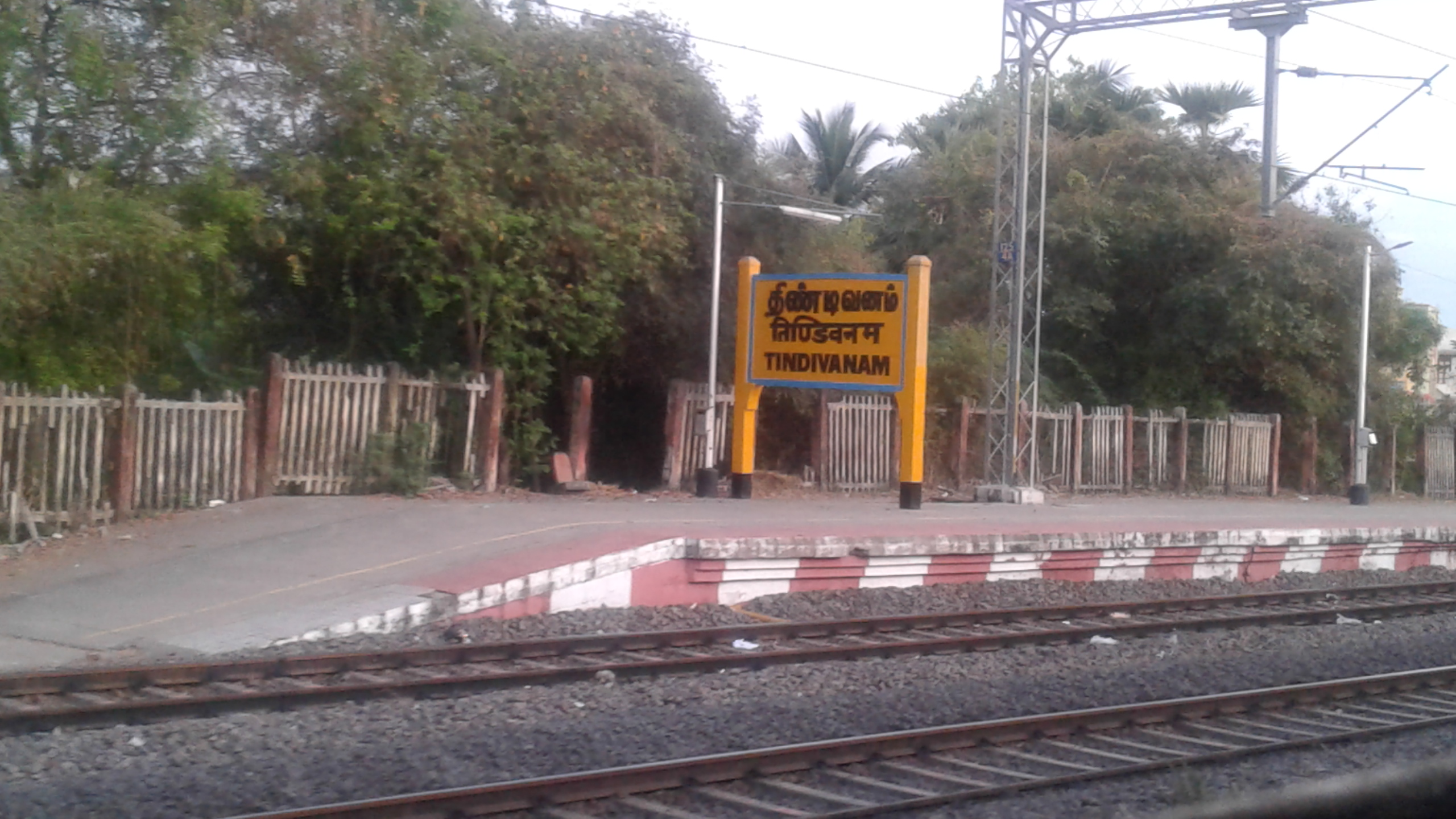
- Tindivanam Railway Station Name Board

General information
- Location: NH 45, Tindivanam, Viluppuram district, Tamil Nadu; India
- Coordinates: 12.2293°N 79.6512°E
- Elevation: 47 metres (154 ft)
- System: Indian Railways station
- Owner: Indian Railways
- Operator: Southern Railway zone
- Line: South Line, Chennai Suburban Chennai–Viluppuram line
- Platforms: 3
- Tracks: 3
- Connections: Auto rickshaw, Taxi

Construction
- Structure type: Standard (on-ground station)
- Parking: Yes

Other information
- Status: Functioning
- Station code: TMV
- Zone(s): Southern Railway zone
- Division(s): Chennai

Services
Preceding station	Chennai Suburban	Following station
Panchalam towards Chengalpattu Junction, Tambaram or Chennai Beach	South Line	Mailam towards Villupuram Junction
Route map
Chennai Beach — Villupuram
Location

Tindivanam railway station (station code: TMV) is an NSG–5 category Indian railway station in Chennai railway division of Southern Railway zone. It is a railway station serving Tindivanam, a city and taluk headquarters in Viluppuram district, Tamil Nadu. It is a station on the South line of the Chennai Suburban Railway.

== Location and layout ==
The station is situated on the NH47 or the GST Road which is the main thoroughfare linking state capital Chennai with central and south Tamil Nadu. The nearest airport is situated at Chennai, which is 108 kilometres (67 mi) from the city.

The railway station has two platforms. The station is located on the Viluppuram–Chennai line and all trains travelling from Chennai Egmore to central and southern Tamil Nadu will have to pass through the station.

=== Station layout ===
G	Street level	Exit/Entrance & ticket counter
P	FOB, Side platform | Doors will open on the left
P	Platform 2	Towards → Chengalpattu Jn / Tambaram / Chennai Beach; Next Station: Panchalam
P	Express Track	Towards → Chengalpattu Jn / Tambaram / Chennai Egmore
P	Platform 1	Towards ← Villuppuram Jn; Next Station: Mailam
P	FOB, Side platform | Doors will open on the left
G	Street level	Exit/Entrance & ticket counter
