= Tiruttani railway station =

Railway Junction in Tiruvallur, India

General information
- Location: Tiruttani, Tamil Nadu
- Coordinates: 13.1797°N 79.6120°E
- Elevation: 88 metres (289 ft)
- System: rail station
- Owner: Indian Railways
- Operator: Southern Railway zone
- Lines: Chennai–Gudur; West North Line, Chennai Suburban
- Platforms: 3 side platforms

Construction
- Parking: Available
- Accessible: Yes

Other information
- Status: Functional
- Station code: TRT
- Zone(s): Southern Railway zone
- Division(s): Chennai
Location
- Location within Tamil Nadu
- Interactive map

Tiruttani railway station (station code: TRT) is a railway station located in Tiruvallur district in the Indian state of Tamil Nadu.

== Description ==
It is located on the Gudur–Chennai section of the Howrah-Chennai main line and is part of the West North Line of Chennai Suburban. It comes under the jurisdiction of Chennai railway division of Southern Railway zone. It is classified as a NSG-4 station (annual revenue from 100 to 200 million rupees and 2 to 5 million passengers handled).
