= Urapakkam =

Suburb of Chennai

- suburb
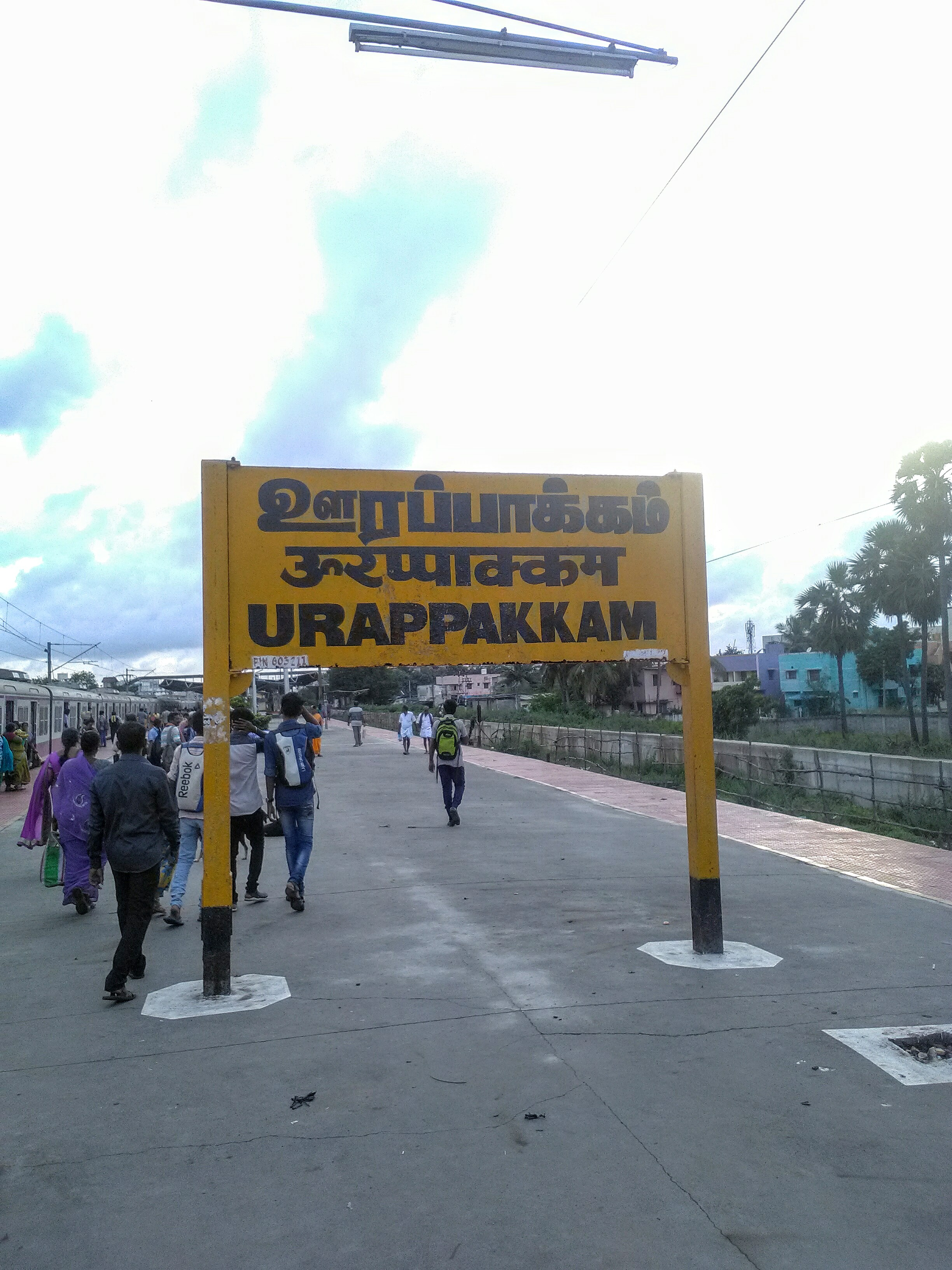
- Urappakkam railway station

- Location within Chennai Location within Tamil Nadu Location within India
- Coordinates: 12.8674°N 80.0699°E
- Country: India
- State: Tamil Nadu
- District: Chengalpattu
- Taluk: Chengalpattu
- Metro: Chennai Metropolitan Area

Population (2011)
  - Total: 29,122

Official
  - Language: Tamil
- Time zone: UTC+5:30 (IST)
- Pincode: 603210

Urapakkam is a southern suburb of Chennai and a panchayat in Chengalpattu district. As per the 2011 census, Urapakkam had a population of 29,122 individuals. It forms part of the Chengalpattu Assembly constituency and Kancheepuram Lok Sabha constituency.

Urapakkam is located on the National Highway 32. It is served by the Urapakkam railway station, which forms part of the South Line of the Chennai Suburban Railway Network.

Kilambakkam bus terminus is located within 2 kms from Urapakkam.
