= T. Samynada Pillai =

Indian civil engineer

T. Samynada Pillai was a building contractor who constructed many prominent buildings in South India.

== Career ==
Samynada Pillai started as a building contractor in Bangalore in 1879. Some of his famous constructions include the Seshadri Iyer Memorial Hall at Cubbon Park. He also renovated the South Indian Railway headquarters at Trichinopoly and offices at Madurai. is work in Bangalore, Trichinopoly and Madurai won him the contract to construct South Indian Railways' principal railway station at Egmore. The Chennai Egmore railway station constructed in 1908 and the Madras and Southern Mahratta Railway headquarters are some of the best remembered works of Samynada Pillai.
