= Chennai railway division =

Railway division of India

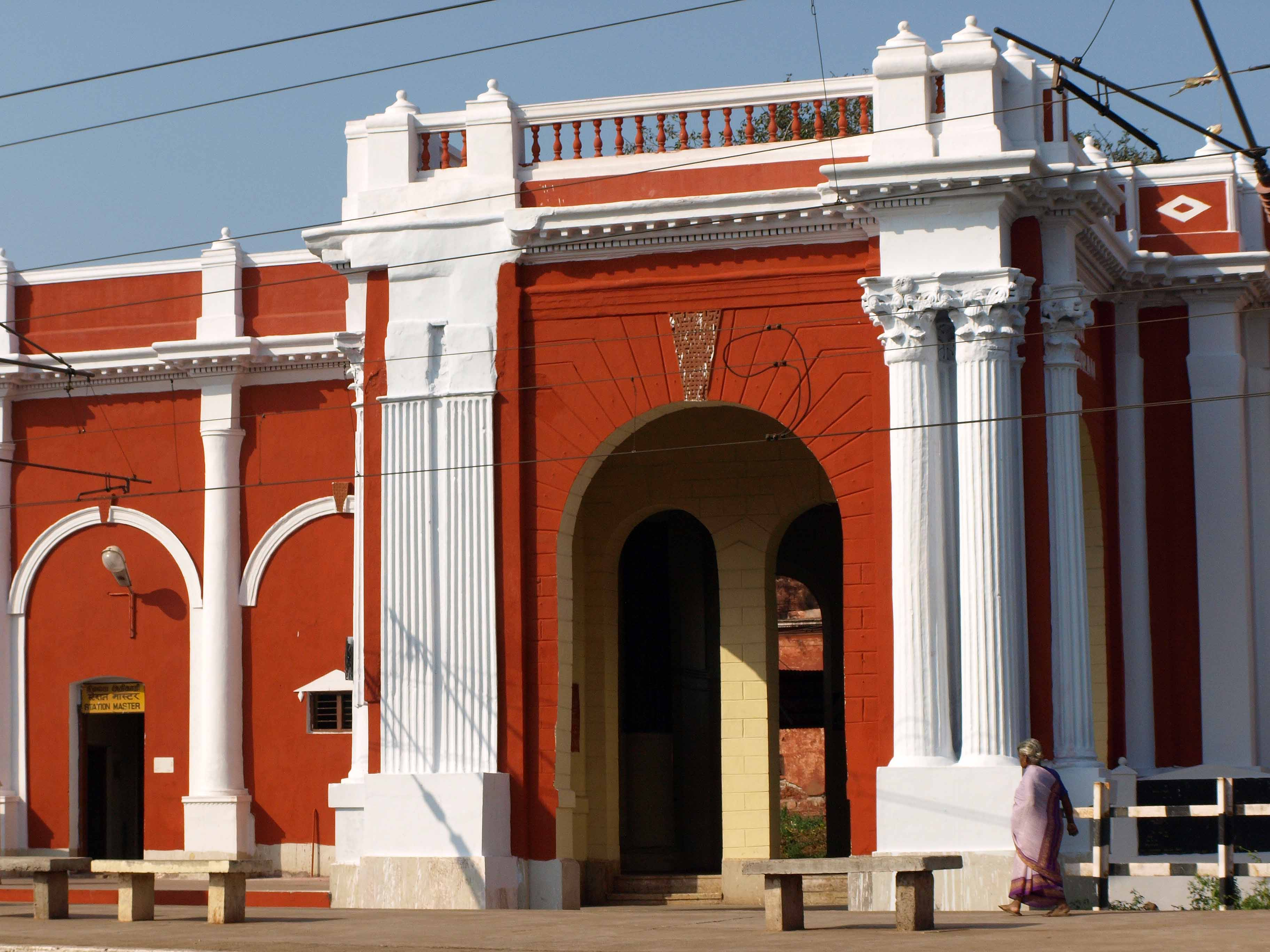
- Royapuram railway station, the first train station in South India

Overview
- Headquarters: Chennai
- Locale: Tamil Nadu, India
- Dates of operation: 1956–
- Predecessor: Southern Railway

Technical
- Track gauge: Broad
- Previous gauge: Metre
- Length: 697.42 km (433.36 mi)

Other
- Website: Southern Railway - Chennai railway division

Chennai railway division is one of the six railway divisions under the jurisdiction of Southern Railway zone of the Indian Railways. Chennai Division was formed on 31 August 1956 . Currently, it has a route length of over 697.93 km and track length of 1934.68 km. Its administrative headquarters is in Chennai, which also happens to be the headquarters of the Southern Railway.

== List of railway stations and towns ==
The list includes the stations under the Chennai railway division and their station category.

Category of station	No. of stations	Names of stations
A-1 Category	2	Puratchi Thalaivar Dr. M.G. Ramachandran Central, Chennai Egmore
A Category	5	Arakkonam Junction, Chengalpattu Junction, Jolarpettai Junction, Katpadi Junction, Tambaram
B Category	8	, Mambalam, Perambur, Tiruvallur, Avadi, Tiruttani, Ambur, Vaniyambadi, Melmaruvathur, Tindivanam
C Category (Suburban station)	-	-
D Category	-	-
E Category	-	-
F Category; Halt Station	-	-
Total	160	-

Stations closed for Passengers -

- Padi railway station (Defunct)
- Anna Nagar railway station (Defunct)

== Projects and development ==
- In May 2022, the 30 km long third railway line between Tambaram and Chengalpattu was completed at a cost of Rs 590 crore and dedicated to the nation by Prime Minister Narendra Modi. This will increase suburban rail services.
- Rs.279 crores were allocated for the construction of the 4.3 km long 4th railway line between Chennai Egmore and Chennai Central railway stations and its construction was completed. On 01 Mar 2026, PM Modi inaugurated 4th lane between Egmore and chennai beach..
- The following stations have been selected in Chennai division under the Amrit Bharat scheme, Chennai Beach, Chengalpattu, Chennai Park, Parangimalai, Guindy, Mambalam, Guduvancheri, Perambur, Tiruvallur, Arakkonam, Tiruttani, Jolarpettai, Ambattur, Gummidipoondi, were selected from Tamil Nadu and Sulurpet Railway Station from Andhra Pradesh.
