= Chennai Egmore railway station =

Railway station in Chennai, India

Chennai Egmore Chennai Ezhumbur
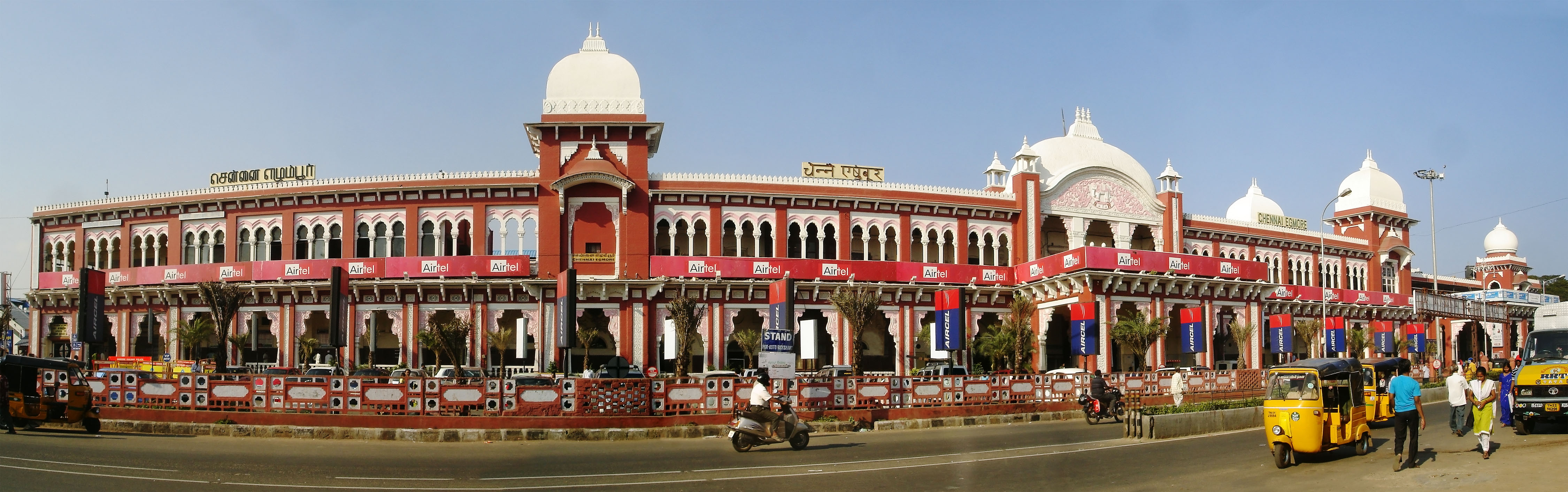
- Chennai Egmore railway station

General information
- Location: Gandhi-Irwin Road, Egmore, Chennai
- Coordinates: 13.0780°N 80.2616°E
- Elevation: 8 m (26 ft)
- System: Indian Railways; Chennai Suburban Railway
- Owner: Ministry of Railways
- Lines: Chennai Egmore–Thanjavur main line; South Line, Chennai Suburban
- Platforms: 11
- Tracks: 12
- Connections: Green Line Egmore

Construction
- Structure type: At-grade
- Platform levels: 1
- Parking: Available
- Accessible: Yes
- Architect: Henry Irwin; E. C. Bird
- Architectural style: Gothic; Indo Saracenic; Dravidian

Other information
- Status: Active
- Station code: MS
- Zone(s): Southern Railway zone
- Division(s): Chennai

History
- Opened: 1880; 146 years ago (station); 11 June 1908; 118 years ago (terminal building)
- Electrified: 1931
- Original company: South Indian Railway

Services
- 120 Mail/Express
- 442 Suburban/MU
per day (2022)
Location
- Location within Chennai Location within Tamil Nadu Location within India

Chennai Egmore (also known as Chennai Ezhumbur, formerly Madras Egmore) (station code: MS), is a major railway station in Chennai, India. It is classified as a NSG–1 category station and comes under the purview of the Chennai railway division of the Southern Railway zone of the Indian Railways. It is situated in the neighbourhood of Egmore, with the main entrance situated on Gandhi-Irwin road and the rear entrance on Poonamallee high road. It caters to inter-city express trains, multiple units, and suburban services.

The station served as the terminus of the South Indian Railway Company in Madras since the 1880s. The construction of the terminal building began in September 1905 and it was officially opened on 11 June 1908. The building is built in Indo Saracenic style. In 1951, the station became part of the Southern Railway zone of the Indian Railways.

== History ==
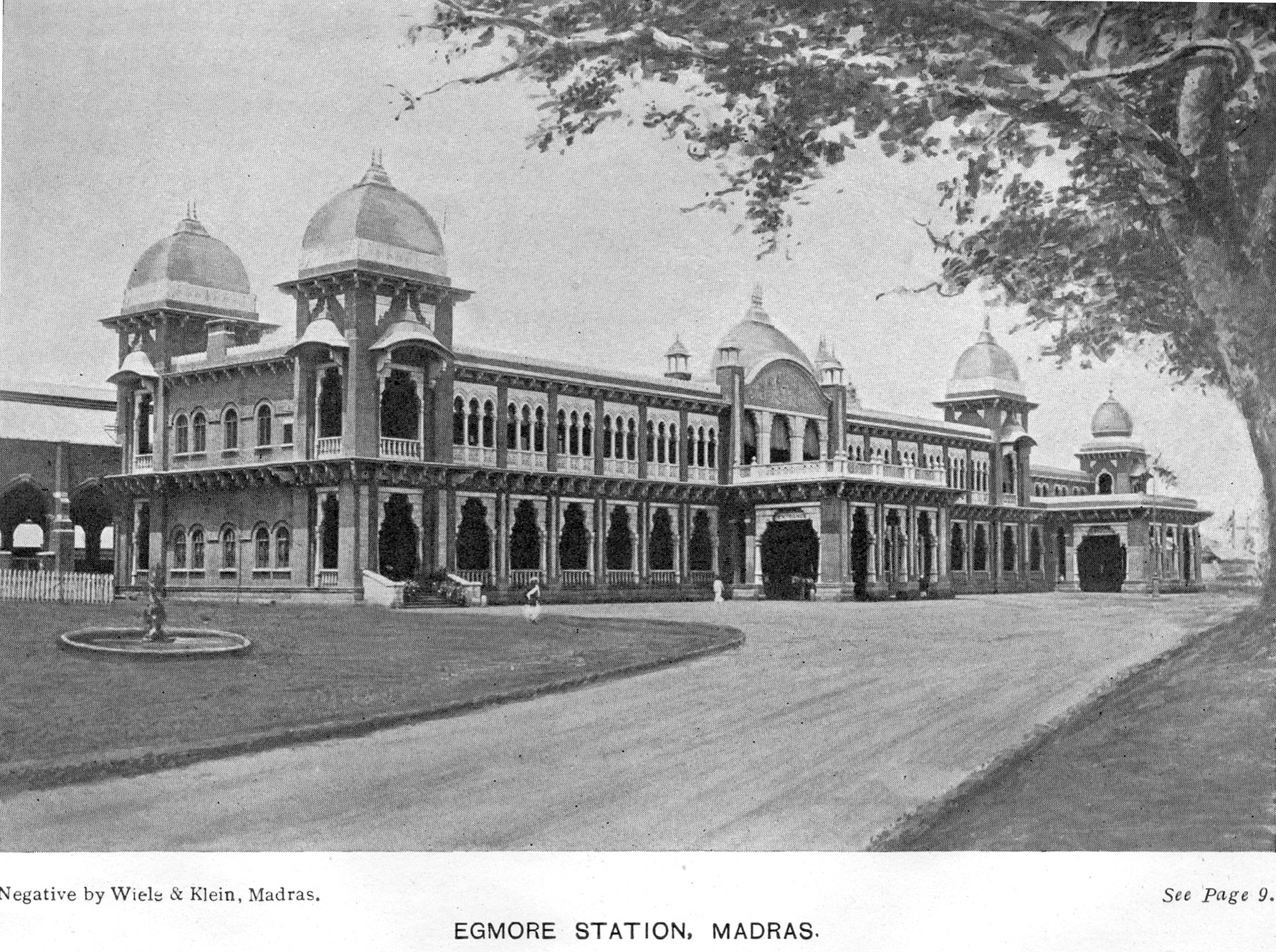
Egmore station in 1913

The site of the railway station hosted a fortified redoubt in the early 18th century, and later housed a sanatorium, and an orphanage in the mid 18th century. By the late 19th century, part of the land was owned by Pulney Andy (1831–1909), one of the first Indians to earn a medical degree in the United Kingdom. The South Indian Railway (SIR) was established in 1874 through the amalgamation of three railway companies that existed in the Madras Presidency. Egmore became the company's terminus in Madras by the 1880s. An increase in traffic led to plans for the construction of a full-fledged terminus in the early 1900s. The station was planned on a 2.5 acres (1.0 ha) plot of land, of which 1.8 acres (0.73 ha) was owned by Andy. After initial reluctance, Andy sold the land for approximately ₹0.1 million (equivalent to ₹45 million or US$470,000 in 2023) in 1904.

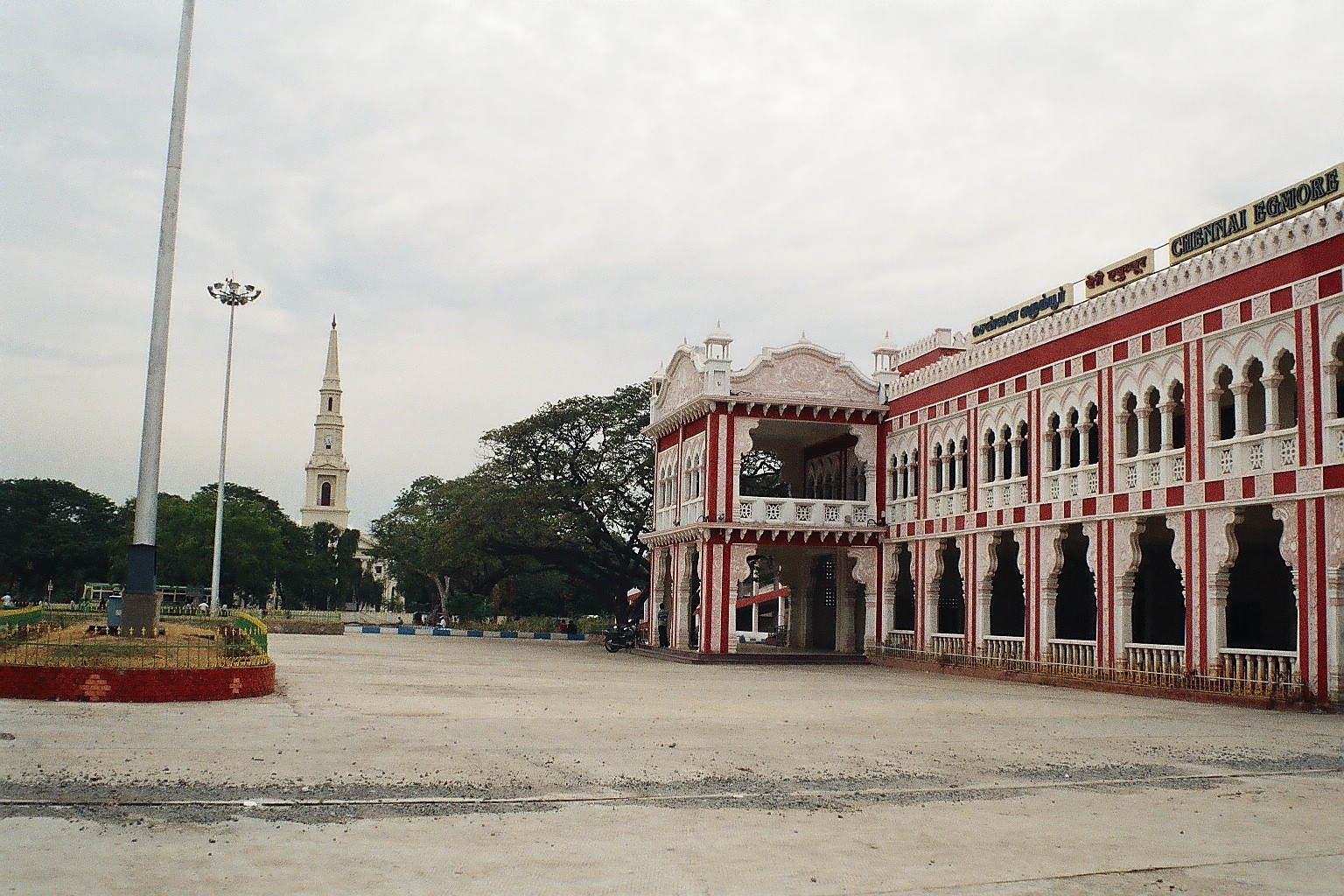
Rear entrance added in 2006

The terminal building was designed by British architects Henry Irwin and E. C. Bird. It measured 300 ft (91 m) by 70 ft (21 m), and was constructed by T. Samynada Pillai. The construction of the station began in September 1905 and was completed in 1908 at a cost of ₹1.7 million (equivalent to ₹450 million or US$4.7 million in 2023). The station was opened to the public on 11 June 1908, and initially relied on diesel generators for electricity. The station underwent developments in 1930, and became part of the first electrified suburban line established in 1931. A signal cabin at the station was opened in 1935, after the suburban line between Madras Beach and Tambaram was electrified. After the nationalisation of the railways in 1951, the station became part of the Southern Railway zone of the Indian Railways, and emerged as a major terminal for trains to the south of the state. The station was expanded in 1980, and the tracks were converted into broad gauge in 1998. The suburban trains continued to operate on meter gauge until 2004 when a new suburban terminal was added to the station. In 2006, a second entrance was established on the Poonamallee High road at a cost of ₹115.3 million (equivalent to ₹370 million or US$3.8 million in 2023). In 2013, ballast-less tracks were laid along the terminus. In the early 2020s, it was one of the stations selected for upgradation under the Amrit Bharat scheme of the Indian Railways, and underwent major renovation as a part of the scheme.

== Design ==
The station lies on a 2.5 acres (1.0 ha) plot of land on Gandhi-Irwin road in Egmore. It is situated between two flyovers on either side of the road. The station building is spread over 135,406 m^{2} (1,457,500 sq ft), and was designed in Gothic and Indo-Saracenic architecture with elements of Dravidian architecture. It was notable for early use of concrete during the construction. The building had a three-span roof structure, with a large dome atop of it. It had carved motifs on the pillars and brackets, which were based on Dravidian temple architecture. The building has been constructed using brick, granite, and sandstone, which gives contrasting appearance. The building had stained glass windows and was earlier equipped with wooden stairways to move across platforms.

== Network and services ==
The station is classified as a NSG–1 category station and comes under the purview of the Chennai railway division of the Southern Railway zone of the Indian Railways. It is located on the Chennai Egmore–Thanjavur main line. It also forms part of the South Line of the Chennai suburban rail network that extends from Chennai Beach towards Tambaram. As of 2022, the station handles about 120 Mail/Express trains and 442 Suburban/Multiple Units daily. While the station serves as a major terminus for trains operating towards the central and southern Tamil Nadu, a few services operate from the station to other destinations in India, by connecting with the Gudur–Chennai section of the Howrah–Chennai main line via Chennai Beach station. Beginning in the early 2010s, Indian Railways terminated few of the services at Tambaram railway station to reduce congestion at the station.

== Facilities ==
There are 11 platforms in the station. In 2019–20, platforms five to nine were extended. The station has a train care centre attached to it, which houses the trains terminating at the station. There are 16 air-conditioned dormitories, 14 retiring rooms, and three waiting halls for passengers.

In April 2012, the Government Railway Police and the Railway Protection Force released a plan in which a helpline was launched and the station was divided into three sectors, for the deployment of security personnel. The station has an Integrated Security Surveillance System implemented in 2012, which consists of a set of CCTV cameras installed around the station. The station has been divided into two zones for cleaning and maintenance–the first six platforms fall under zone I and the remaining platforms fall under zone II.

== Connectivity ==
There is a bus shelter at the southern entrance at the Gandhi-Irwin road and a bus terminus near the northern entrance on the Poonamallee High road. Bus services are operated by the state-run Metropolitan Transport Corporation. There is a multi-storey parking lot attached to the station. Pre-paid taxi and autorickshaw services are also available from the station. The Egmore metro station on the Green Line of the Chennai Metro serves the station.

== See also ==
- Chennai Central railway station – Railway terminus in Tamil Nadu, India
- Heritage structures in Chennai
