= South West Line, Chennai Suburban =

South-West Line

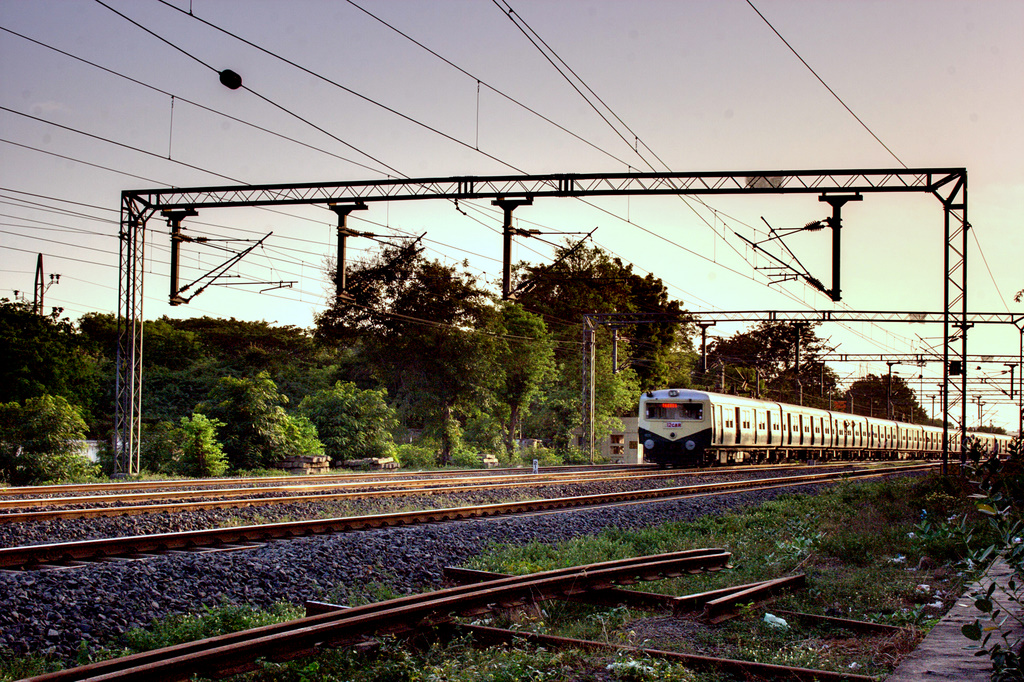

Overview
- Status: Operational till Arakkonam
- Termini: Chennai Beach (Madras Beach); Arakkonam
- Stations: 39

Service
- Type: Suburban railway
- System: Chennai Suburban Railway
- Operator: Southern Railway (India)
- Depot(s): Tambaram, Egmore

Technical
- Line length: 122.71 km
- Track gauge: Broad Gauge
- Operating speed: 90 km/h (maximum service speed)

The South West Line of Chennai Suburban Railway is the sixth longest suburban line that runs southwest from Chennai (Madras) City.

== Sections ==
=== Beach — Tambaram ===
- This section has 2 dedicated lines for the suburban train operations apart from 2 main lines for mixed traffic.
- EMUs are operated along 3rd and 4th main lines during peak hours.
- 12-car EMU are operated in this sector.

=== Tambaram — Chengalpattu ===
- This section has 3 dedicated lines for the suburban trains operations apart from 1 main line for mixed traffic
- 4th line is planned.
- 12-car EMU are operated in this sector.

=== Chengalpattu — Kanchipuram — Arakkonam ===
- This section has dedicated 1 line for the suburban trains and mixed traffic
- 2nd line is planned
- 12-Car EMU is operated in this sector
