= Tambaram railway station =

Railway station serving the City of Tambaram in Chennai Metropolitan Area, India

Tambaram Thaambaram
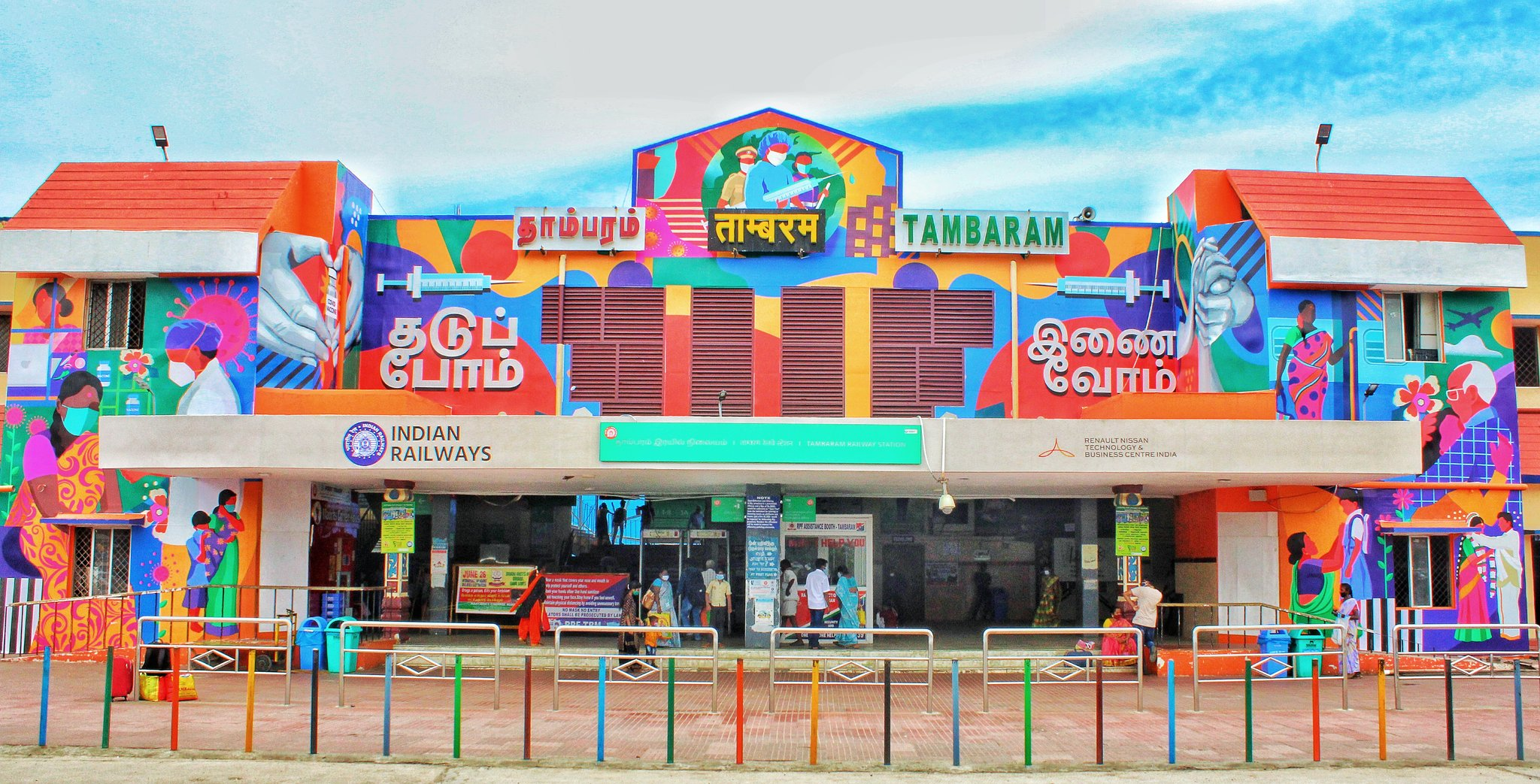
- Tambaram Railway Station

General information
- Location: Tambaram, Chennai; Tamil Nadu; India
- Coordinates: 12°55′34″N 80°07′03″E
- System: Commuter and Regional rail station
- Owner: Ministry of Railways (India)
- Operator: Indian Railways
- Line: Chennai Egmore–Thanjavur main line
- Distance: 26 km (16 mi) from Chennai Central; 25 km (16 mi) from Egmore
- Platforms: 10 Side platforms (Commissioned)
- Tracks: 12
- Connections: Tambaram MTC bus terminus Blue Line - Tambaram metro station

Construction
- Structure type: At-grade
- Parking: Available

Other information
- Status: Active
- Station code: TBM
- Zone(s): Southern Railway
- Division(s): Chennai
- Classification: Non-suburban 1 (NSG 1)

History
- Opened: 2004
- Electrified: 1931

Passengers
- 2018: 150,000 (per day)
Route map
Location
- Location within Tamil Nadu Location within India

Tambaram Railway Station (station code: TBM) is an NSG–1 category Indian railway station in Chennai railway division of Southern Railway zone. It is also one of the railway terminals of the Chennai Beach–Tambaram section of the Chennai Suburban Railway Network, situated at a distance of 6 kilometres (3.7 mi) from the centre of Tambaram and 27 kilometres (17 mi) from Chennai Beach station. It is one of the fastest-growing railway hubs outside Chennai Central in the southern direction. Every day, on an average, around 150,000 commuters use the station. About 500 suburban electric trains operate from Tambaram, including those between Chennai Beach and Chengalpattu and Kancheepuram. Further, more than 25 express trains, including those bound for Howrah and other places in the northern India, pass through the town. It is also the third busiest station in the city (after Chennai Central and Chennai Egmore). It is one of the four railway terminals within Chennai City. The daily ticket sales at Tambaram fetch ₹ 1 million, half of which comes from suburban travellers. It is the second most revenue-generating station in Chennai after Moore Market Complex. A total of 52 trains pass through the station.

Tambaram Railway Station divides Tambaram into East Tambaram and West Tambaram. It has two entrances, namely, the West Tambaram entrance on the GST Road and the East Tambaram entrance on Velachery Road (opposite MCC College). There are Ten platforms in the station. Platforms 1-4 are used for suburban trains between Chengalpattu and Chennai Beach and platforms between 5 and 10 are used by the long-distance express trains and some fast EMU trains between Chennai Beach - Chengalpattu Junction - Arakkonam Junction section. Most of the suburban electric train services originating from Tambaram to Beach and Chengalpattu leave from the first 4 platforms. There is a foot overbridge connecting East and West Tambaram with access to all platforms. In 2008, Southern Railway started building an additional platform at the westernmost side of the railway station, making Platform No.1 a double-discharge platform, a design that helps commuters to alight on either side of the train, similar to the one at Park railway station, where the passengers could alight on the western side for quicker access to Chennai Central.

== History ==
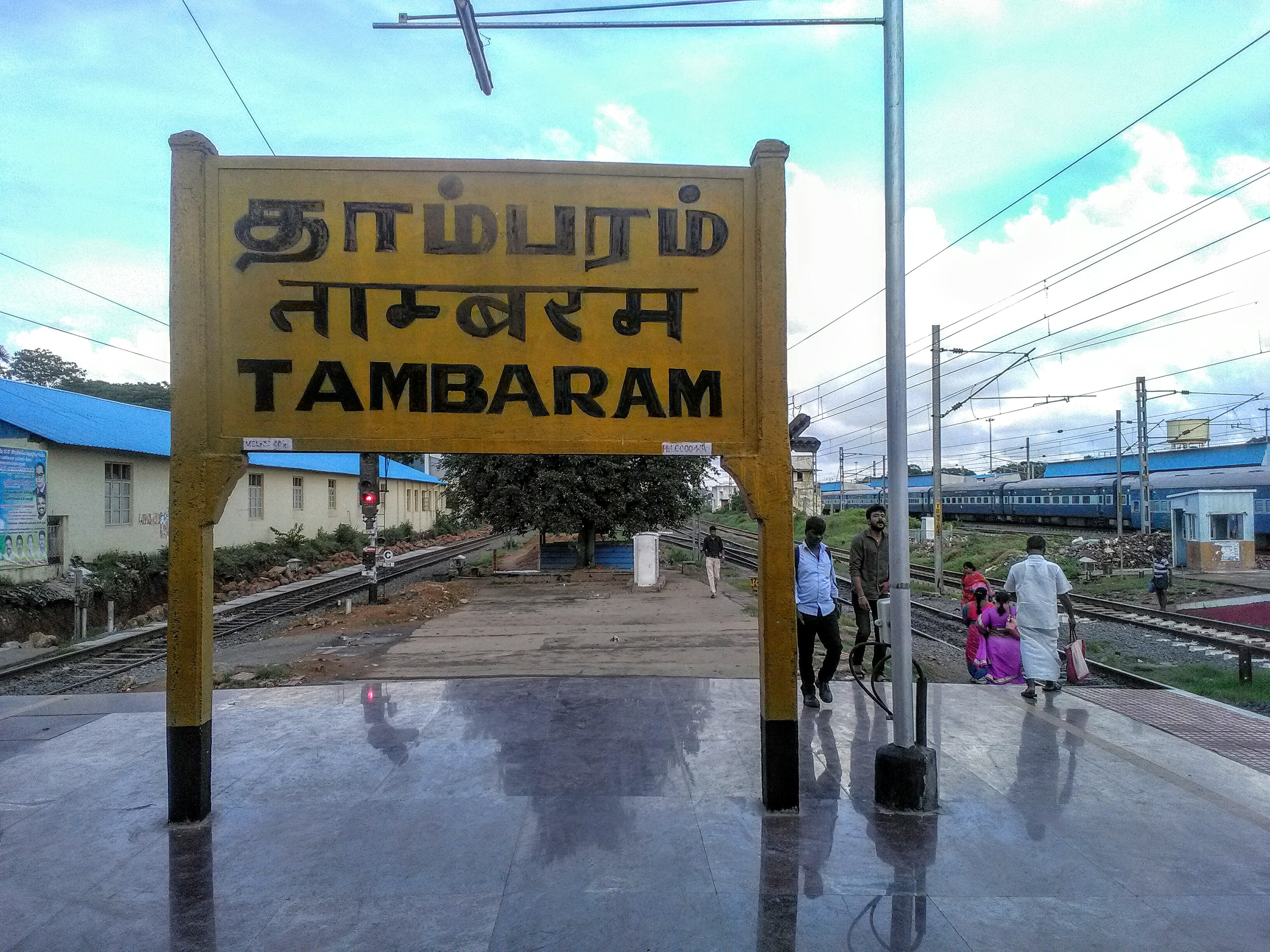
Station nameboard at Tambaram railway station

The lines at the station were one of the first in Chennai to be electrified. They were energised on 1.5 kV DC in 1931 with the electrification of the Chennai Beach–Tambaram section, and the third line in the section was electrified on 15 January 1965. The lines further south from the station, up to Chengalpattu, were electrified on 9 January 1965. On 15 January 1967, all the lines were converted to 25 kV AC.

== Traffic ==
Every day, 160 train services are operated between Chennai Beach and Tambaram, 70 between Tambaram and Chengalpet and 16 between Tambaram and Kancheepuram.

Ticket sales at Tambaram Station are the highest on the suburban sector. Monthly sales of tickets, which stood at 0.712 million in November 2010, went up to 0.75 million in November 2011, when the state government hiked bus fares. It shot up to 0.837 million in December 2011 and to 0.871 million in January 2012. In April 2012, the figure touched 0.826 million. Nearly 95 percent of the tickets sold are on the suburban sector, while the remaining are to neighbouring and southern districts. As of 2013, about 20,000 people buy tickets at the station daily.

== Hub terminal ==
In an effort to decongest the traffic at the Chennai Central railway station, Chennai Egmore was announced as the second terminal, and the railways has decided to make Tambaram as the third terminal so that the trains from southern districts could halt there. It has become a major railway terminus in Tambaram.

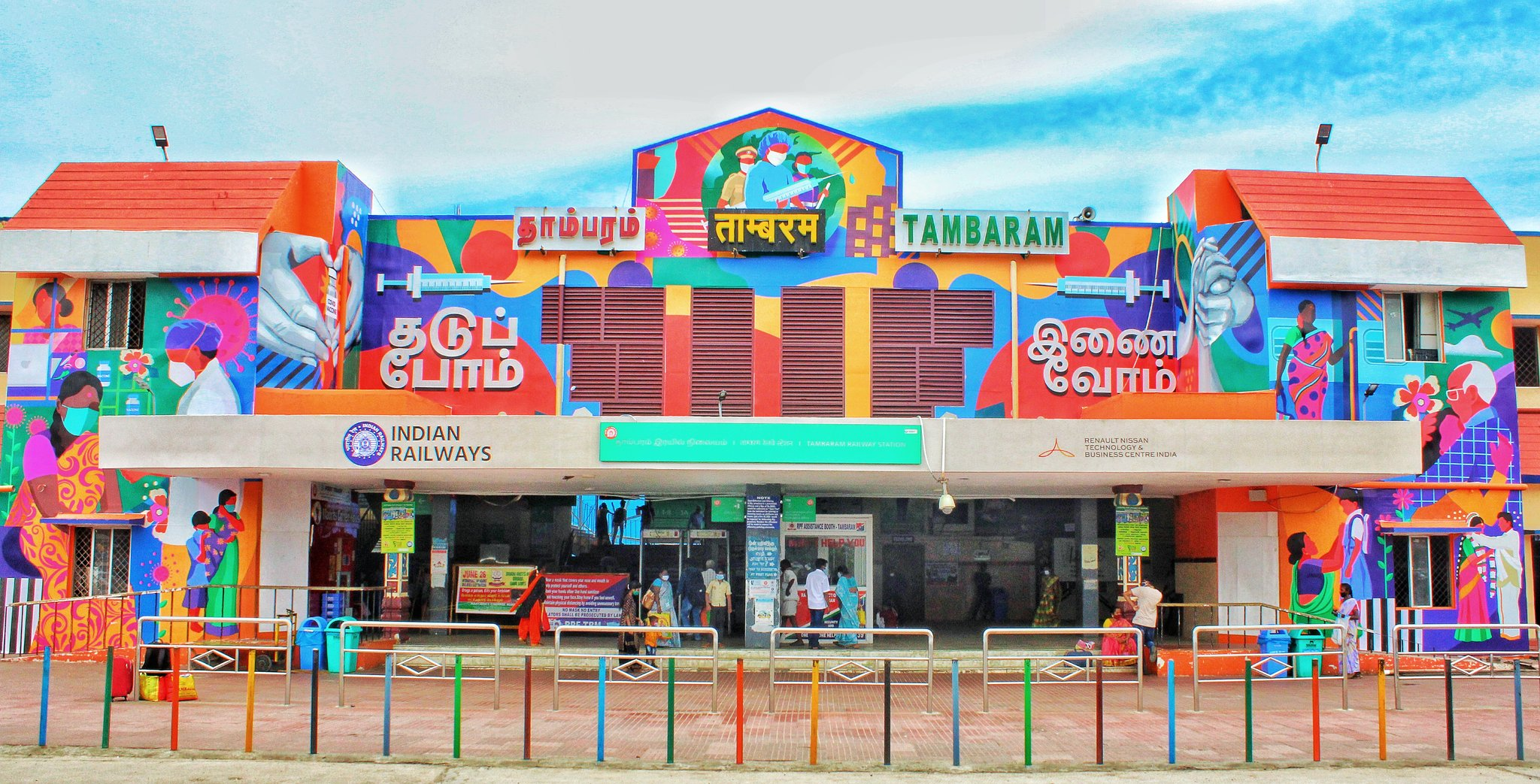
Main entrance of the station

The station's proximity to the Central Warehousing Corporation's godown located at Chitlapakkam makes it technically important. Four railway lines exist between Chennai Beach and Tambaram, two for up and down long-distance trains and two for up and down suburban services. However, only two rail lines exist between Tambaram and Chengalpattu, which are not enough to meet the growing demand of the section let alone its future requirements. March 2013 has been set as the deadline for the completion of the first phase of Tambaram station development project, and Southern Railway had prepared and submitted to the railway board a proposal to lay additional lines for a 30 kilometres (19 mi) stretch from Tambaram to Chengalpattu at an estimate of ₹ 2,000 million but the board is yet to give its approval. As a first step towards this, Southern Railways plans to set up a coaching terminal at Tambaram at an approximate cost of ₹ 340 million. It will have pit lines for maintenance, stabling lines and additional platforms.

Sheds

The station had a huge metre-gauge freight marshalling yard for Chennai, which has been closed. It is also a former electric shed and home to the YAM-1 locomotives. Presently, the station has a broad-gauge EMU maintenance and car shed. The EMU car shed was established in 1931 and has adequate facilities to maintain 12-coach rakes. As of 2006, the number of staff in charge of maintenance at the car shed is six per car.

== Developments ==
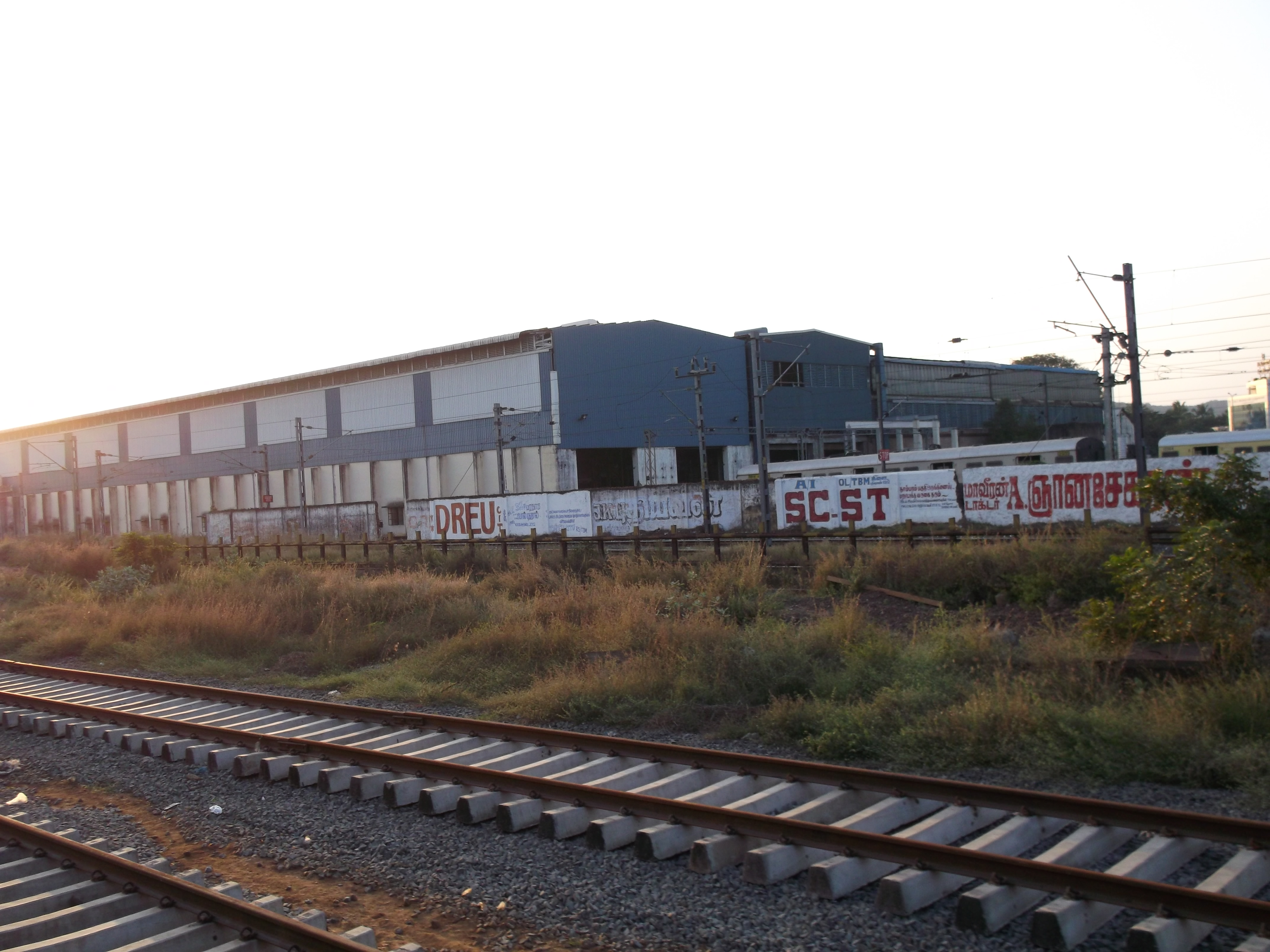
EMU car shed at Tambaram railway station

The first broad-gauge line at Tambaram was laid in 1995–96, which was part of the broad gauge conversion from Egmore. In 2004, platform 2 was converted to broad-gauge line. In 2008, platform 1 was built. Subsequently, the conversion of lines at platforms 3, 4 and 5 into broad gauge was taken up but had to be halted due to a shortage of funds.

A new station building with 10 ticket counters at the western side of the track was constructed at a cost of ₹ 13 million in 2003. Space was provided for food courts, coffee parlours, a medical shop and public call offices and also for shunting wagons. It was designed to have six retiring rooms, three of which were to be air-conditioned, in addition to two air-conditioned dormitories, deluxe waiting halls and a VIP lounge.

Along the lines of a similar facility at the Chennai Central railway station, the Southern Railways constructed a bus bay in 2006 to serve the more than 100,000 passengers who travel by Metropolitan Transport Corporation (MTC) buses in Tambaram. On an average, Tambaram records an increase of 30,000 passengers every year for MTC buses. Every day, 1,500 MTC buses are run from Tambaram to Mamallapuram, Tiruporur (on OMR), Kovalam and Vadamalli (on ECR), Sriperumbudur and Walajabad, among other places.

On 5 January 2012, Southern Railway started preliminary works for shifting south-bound trains to Tambaram junction although there were protests against the proposal of making Tambaram the third terminal of Chennai after Chennai Central and Chennai Egmore. To begin with, the Southern Railway decided to construct an escalator at the main entrance and another at the eastern side (facing Madras Christian College). It was also decided to install common escalators for platforms 1 and 2 where passengers of suburban trains alight besides another one for passengers alighting from south-bound express trains on platforms 6 and 7, a feature already available at Egmore junction. The station has enough space to build three additional platforms. In 2014, an escalator connecting East Tambaram with the foot overbridge and platform 1A was installed in the station, the first of its kind in a suburban station around Chennai. In June 2018, the new coach terminal constructed on the eastern side of the station became operational. In March 2021, an electronic interlocking system for facilitating faster movement of trains at the Tambaram yard was commissioned. It replaced the route relay interlocking mechanism with the Kyson system.

As of March 2021, a 29-kilometre (18 mi) third line between Tambaram and Chengalpattu was being laid, of which the stretch between Guduvancheri and Chengalpattu was completed, with speed trial completed on 3 March 2021. Work on the remaining 11-km portion of the line is expected to be completed by the end of May 2021.

== Security ==
In 2011, the measures were taken to enhance the security at the railway station. Work on the integrated security system began on 17 August 2011, which will include more closed-circuit television (CCTV) cameras, door-frame metal detectors, baggage screening devices costing about ₹ 4 million and a separate control room for the Railway Protection Force (RPF) for better communication and co-ordination with the headquarters. The station, which has 14 CCTV cameras, will get 26 more CCTV cameras in important locations, including on Platforms 3 and 4, the parking lot and the coach shed. Laying of cables has already begun. The existing analogue cameras at Tambaram will be converted into digital cameras. The high-resolution CCTV cameras, capable of zooming down to 100 metres (330 ft) and being remote controlled, are enabled with Internet Protocol.

The ₹ 400-million Integrated Security Surveillance System (ISSS) project is implemented jointly by the Southern Railways and HCL Infosystems.

== Accident rates ==
On the Guindy–Chengalpattu suburban section, comprising 17 stations, the Chromepet–Tambaram stretch remains the deadliest with at least 15 accidents a month.

== Train timings ==
Tambaram has train facility from early morning 4 am to midnight. The Beach–Tambaram trains have a frequency of 10 minutes during peak hours. Chengalpattu to beach train flows for every 30 minutes. In the morning, the station is full of students and office goers.

== See also ==
- Chennai Suburban Railway
- Railway stations in Chennai
- Royapuram railway station
