= Chengalpattu Junction railway station =

Railway station in Tamil Nadu, India

Chengalpattu Junction Chingalput Junction
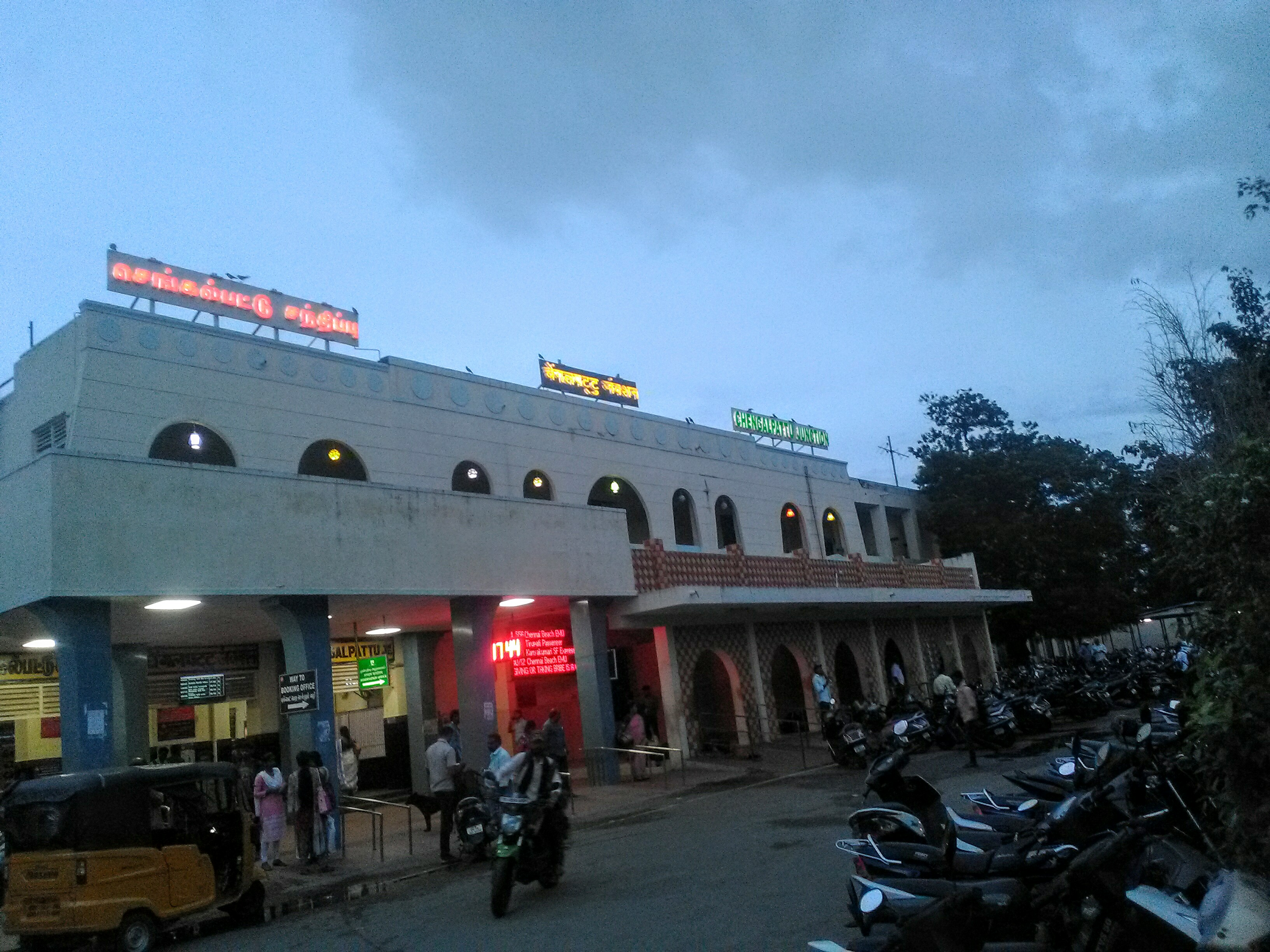
- Chengalpattu Junction railway station entrance

General information
- Location: SH 58, Chengalpattu, Chengalpattu district, Tamil Nadu; India
- Coordinates: 12°41′35″N 79°58′49″E
- Elevation: 41 metres (135 ft)
- System: Indian Railways and Chennai Suburban Railway station
- Owner: Indian Railways
- Operator: Southern Railway zone
- Line: Chennai Egmore–Kumbakonam–Thanjavur line
- Platforms: 8
- Tracks: 9
- Connections: TNSTC, SETC, Auto rickshaw stand

Construction
- Structure type: Standard (on ground station)
- Parking: Yes
- Accessible: Disabled access

Other information
- Status: Functioning
- Station code: CGL
- Zone(s): Southern Railway Zone
- Division(s): Chennai
- Fare zone: Indian Railways

History
- Electrified: 25 kV AC 50 Hz

Services
| Preceding station | Chennai Suburban | Following station |
|---|---|---|
| Paranur towards Tambaram or Chennai Beach | South Line | Tirumani towards Villupuram Junction |
Route map
Chennai Beach — Villupuram
Location

Chengalpattu Junction railway station (station code: CGL) is an NSG–2 category Indian railway station in Chennai railway division of Southern Railway zone. It is a railway junction of the southern section of the Chennai Suburban Railway Network situated in the town of Chengalpattu, 56 kilometres (35 mi) south-west of Chennai Beach.

== History ==
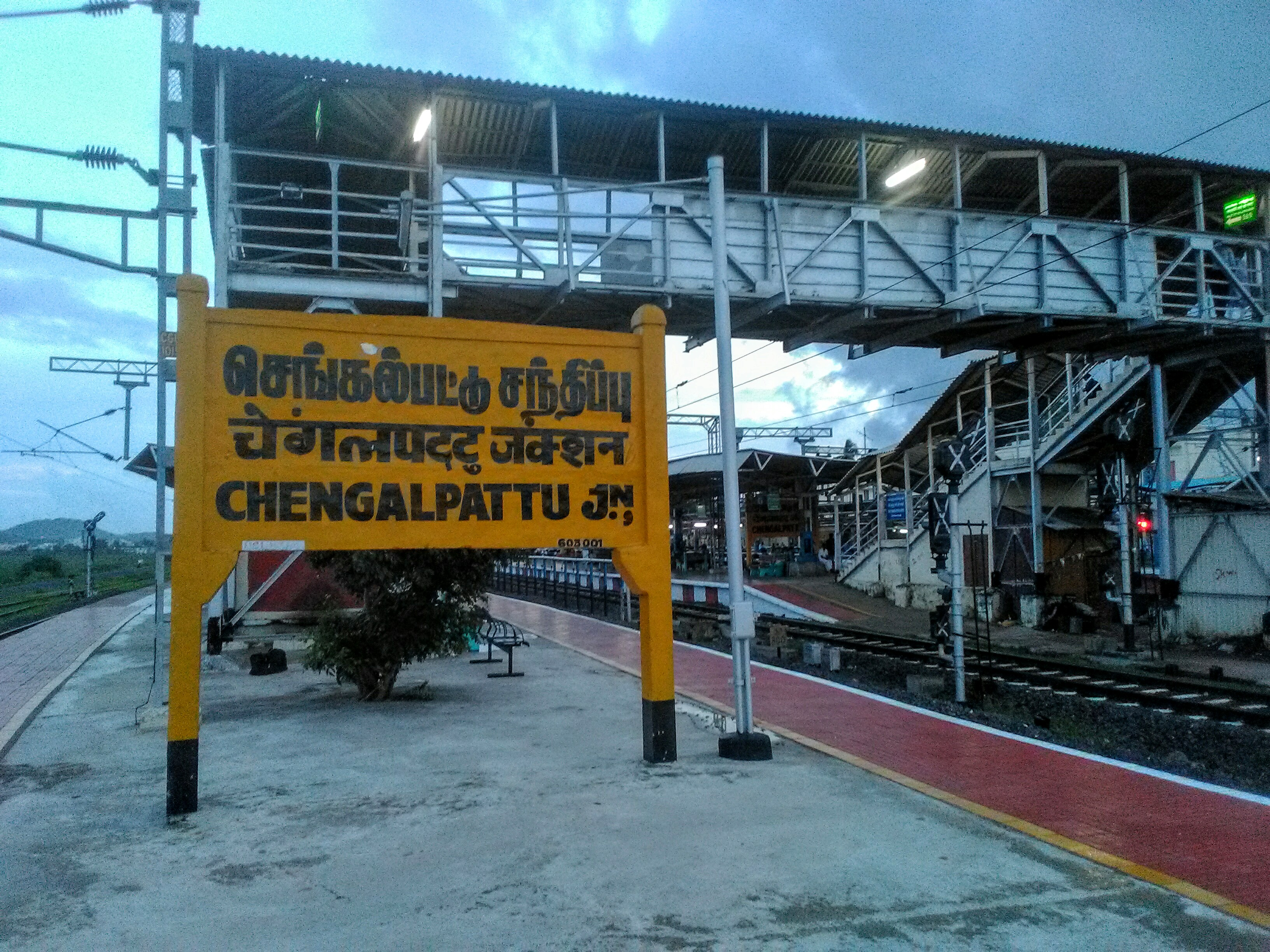

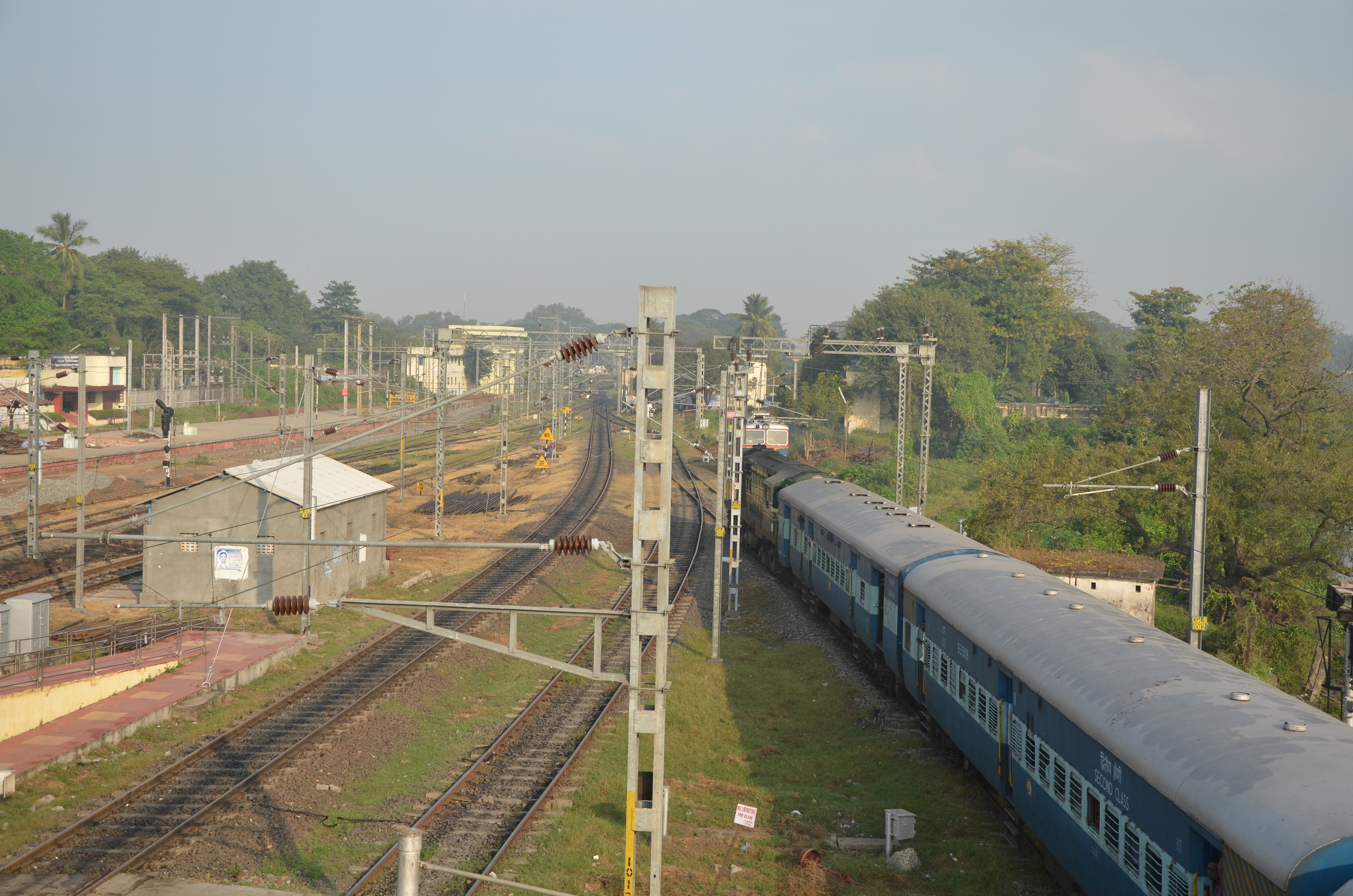

The lines at the station were electrified on 9 January 1965, with the electrification of the Tambaram—Chengalpattu section.

== Location and layout ==
The Chengalpattu train station is located at the heart of the Chengalpattu city, on the banks of the Kolavai Lake. It is situated on the SH-58, and opposite to its main entrance lies the TNSTC and Mofussil bus terminals. There is also a statue in the memory of Periyar outside the train station.

The station is a part of the Chennai–Villupuram line and another line, the Arakkonam–Chengalpattu line.

The nearest airport from the station is the Chennai International Airport located at a distance of nearly 42 kilometres from the city.

== Traffic ==
The Chengalpattu Junction being a focal point on the Chennai–Villupuram line, inevitably means that every south-bound train from Chennai has to operate via the junction thus making it one of the most crowded railway stations of the Indian Railways.

There also several suburban trains operating from and through the station towards Chennai and the station holds prime importance in the South and South-west lines of the Chennai Suburban Railway.

== Projects and development ==
It is one of the 73 stations in Tamil Nadu to be named for upgradation under Amrit Bharat Station Scheme of Indian Railways.

== See also ==
- Chennai Suburban Railway
