= South Line, Chennai Suburban =

South Line

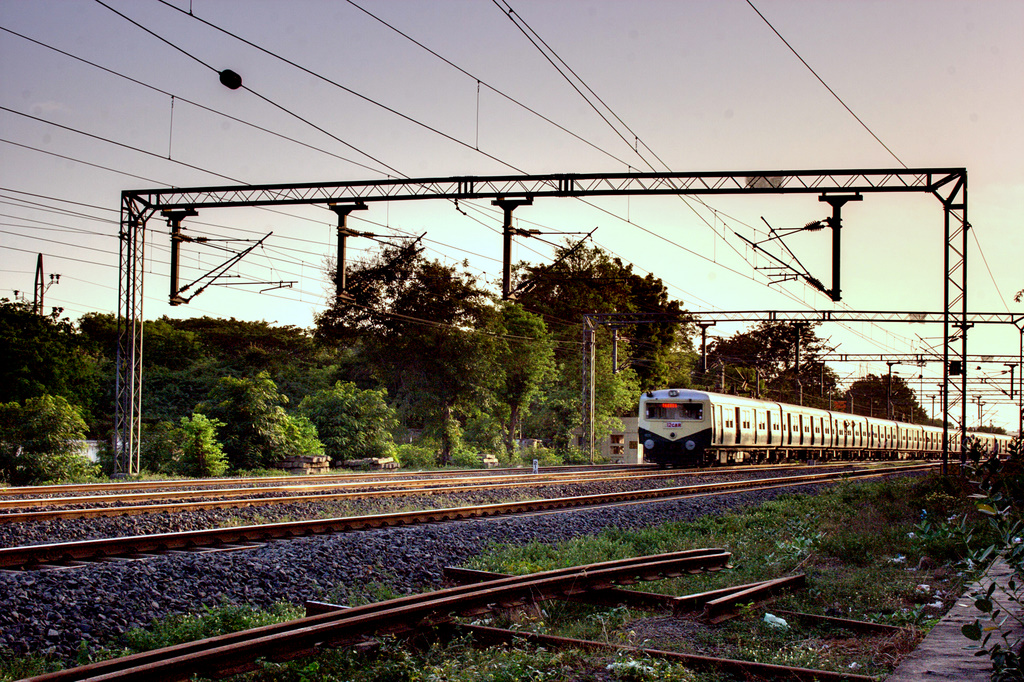

Overview
- Status: Operational
- Termini: Chennai Beach (Madras Beach); Pondicherry
- Stations: 50

Service
- Type: Suburban railway
- System: Chennai Suburban Railway
- Operator: Southern Railway (India)
- Depot(s): Chennai Egmore (Madras Egmore), Tambaram, Chengalpattu, Pondicherry

History
- Opened: 1931; 95 years ago

Technical
- Line length: 200.6 kilometres (124.6 mi) (60 km Suburban and 140.6 km MEMU)
- Track gauge: Broad Gauge
- Electrification: Yes
- Operating speed: 100 km/h (maximum service speed)
Route map
Chennai Beach — Villupuram

The South Line of Chennai Suburban Railway is the fourth longest suburban line that runs southwards from Chennai (Madras) City. It is the oldest suburban line of Chennai (Madras), opened in 1931. Suburban services terminate at Chengalpattu (Chengelpet) and MEMU services at Pondicherry. The capacity utilisation of Chennai Beach-Egmore-Tambaram section is 69 percent. The tract travels along the GST Road from St.Thomas Mount to Villupuram.

== Sections ==
=== Beach–Tambaram ===
- This 30 km section has (1st and 2nd line) 2 dedicated lines for the suburban train operations apart from 2 main lines for mixed traffic.
- EMUs are operated along 3rd and 4th main lines during peak hours.
- 12-car EMU are operated in this sector.

=== Tambaram–Chengalpattu ===
- This 31 km section has three railway lines in which suburban trains as well as long distance (south bound) trains are operated.
- 12-car EMU are operated in this sector.

=== Beach–Chengalpattu ===
- This 55 km section has (1st and 2nd line) 2 dedicated lines for the suburban train operations apart from 2 main lines for mixed traffic.
- EMUs are operated along 3rd lines during peak hours.
- 12-car EMU are operated in this sector.

=== Tambaram–Villupuram ===
- Two MEMU Train service is operational between Tambaram and Villupuram.
- 12-car EMU are operated in this sector

=== Villupuram-Chennai Beach ===
- A MEMU service is operational between Chennai Beach - Villupuram - Chennai Beach
- 12-car EMU are operated in this sector

=== Egmore–Villupuram-Puducherry ===
- One MEMU service between Chennai Egmore - Puducherry Via Villupuram is operational.
- 12-car EMU are operated in this sector

== Hours of Operation ==
- Chennai Beach–Tambaram

The first EMU starts from Chennai Beach at 3:55 and the last train at 23:59. Most of the trains in this section end at Tambaram station. The peak hour headway is 7 minutes and the headway at the first and last hours of operation is 20 minutes.

- Tambaram–Chennai Beach

The first EMU starts from Tambaram at 4:00 and the last train at 23.55. Peak hour headway is 7 minutes.

- Tambaram–Chengalpattu

The first EMU starts from Tambaram at 4:50 and the last train at 23:40. Peak hour headway is 15 minutes.

- Chengalpattu–Tambaram

The first EMU starts from Chengalpattu at 4:05 and the last train at 23.10. Peak hour headway is 15 minutes.

- Tambaram–Villupuram-Chennai Beach
  - Two service from Villupuram to Tambaram at 05:25 and 08:10
  - Two services from Tambaram to Villupuram at 09:45 and 13:15
- Villupuram– Chennai Beach
  - Services from Villupuram to Chennai Beach at 13:45 and 17:45
  - Services from Tambaram to Villupuram at 18:05 and 08:40

== Gallery ==
=== Guindy station in 2006 ===
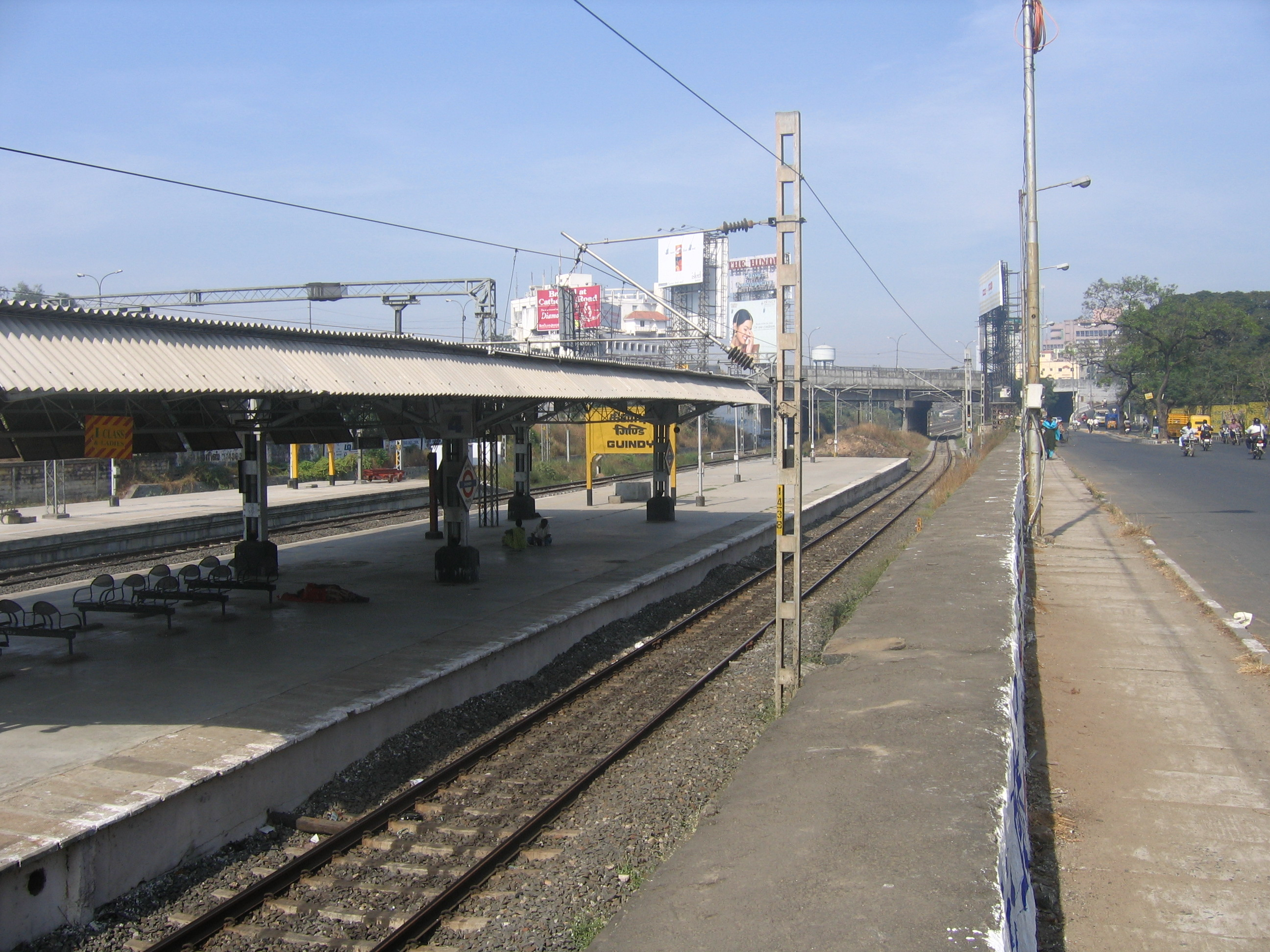

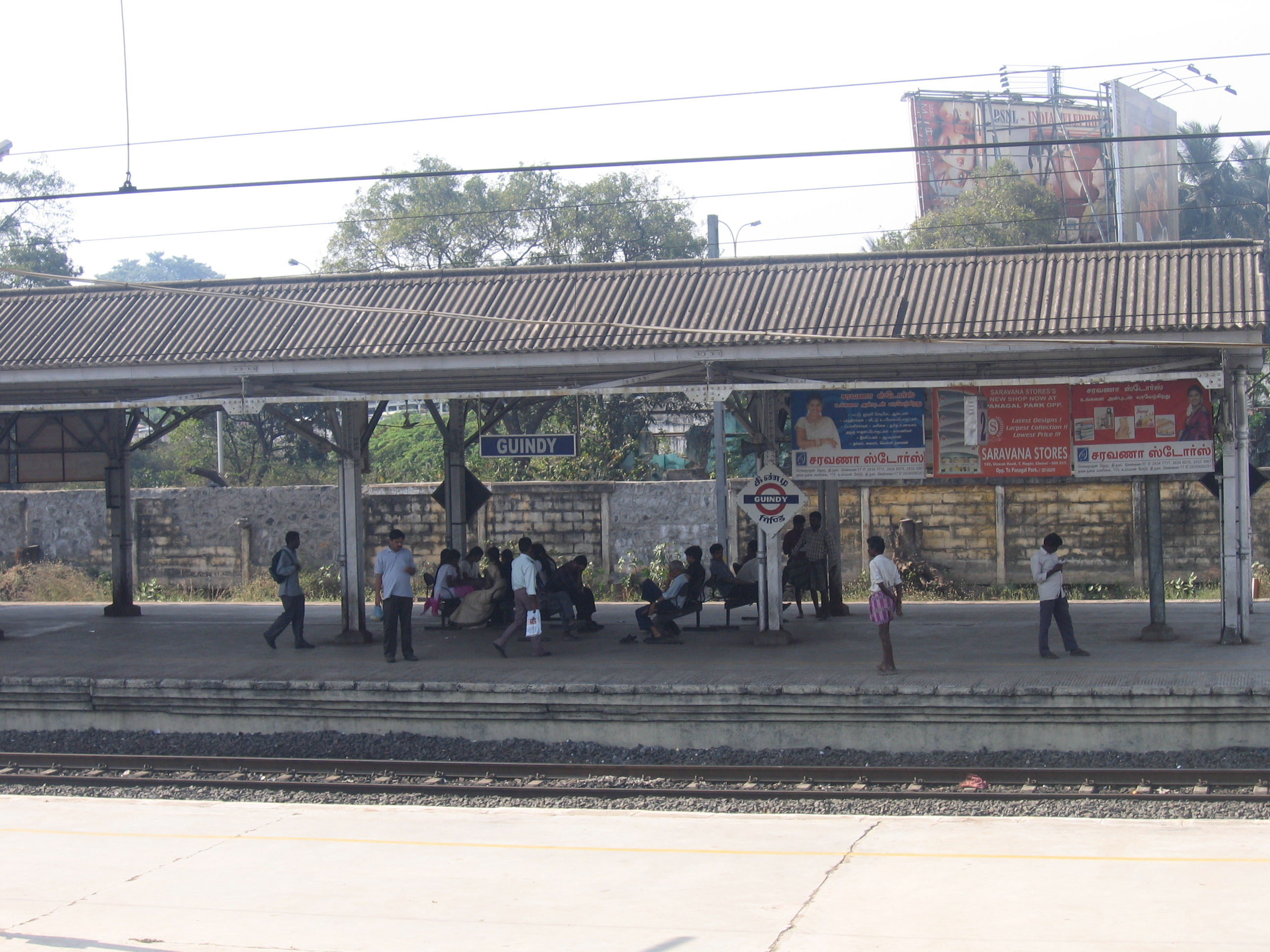
