= Tambaram–Rameswaram Express =

Train in India

Tambaram - Rameswaram Express
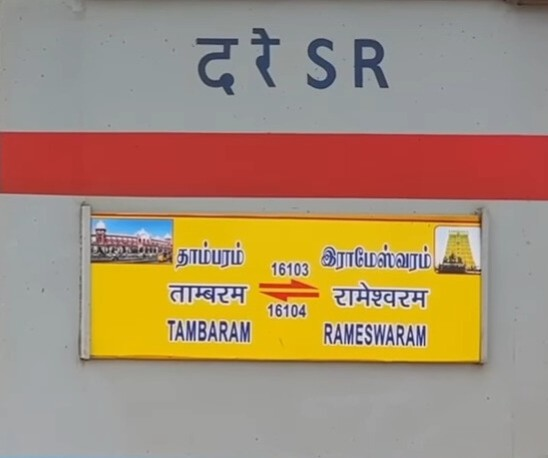

Overview
- Service type: Express
- Status: Active
- Locale: Tamil Nadu
- First service: 6 April 2025; 19 months ago
- Current operator: Southern Railway (SR)

Route
- Termini: Tambaram (TBM); Rameswaram (RMM)
- Stops: 16
- Distance travelled: 618 km (384 mi)
- Average journey time: 11h 30m
- Service frequency: Daily
- Train number: 16103 / 16104

On-board services
- Classes: General Unreserved, Sleeper Class, AC 2nd Class, AC 3rd Class
- Seating arrangements: Yes
- Sleeping arrangements: Yes
- Catering facilities: On-board catering
- Observation facilities: Large windows
- Baggage facilities: No
- Other facilities: Below the seats

Technical
- Rolling stock: LHB coach
- Track gauge: 1,676 mm (5 ft 6 in)
- Electrification: 25 kV 50 Hz AC Overhead line
- Operating speed: 130 km/h (81 mph) maximum, 54 km/h (34 mph) average including halts.
- Track owner: Indian Railways

The 16103 / 16104 Tambaram–Rameswaram Express is an express train belonging to Southern Railway zone that runs between Tambaram and Rameswaram in Tamil Nadu, India.

It operates as train number 16103 from Tambaram to Rameswaram and as train number 16104 in the reverse direction, serving the state of Tamil Nadu.

== Services ==
- 16103/ Tambaram–Rameswaram Express has an average speed of 54 km/h and covers 618 km in 11h 30m.
- 16104/ Rameswaram–Tambaram Express has an average speed of 53 km/h and covers 618 km in 11h 45m.

== Routes and halts ==
The Important Halts of the train are :

- Tambaram
- Chengalpattu Junction
- Villupuram Junction
- Thirupadripulyur
- Chidambaram
- Mayiladuthurai Junction
- Thiruvaur Junction
- Tiruturaipundi Junction
- Pattukottai
- Arantangi
- Karaikuddi Junction
- Shivaganga
- Manamadurai Junction
- Paramakkudi
- Ramanathapuram
- Rameswaram

== Schedule ==
- 16103 - 6:10 PM (Daily) [Tambaram]
- 16104 - 4:00 PM (Daily) [Rameswaram]

== Coach composition ==
1. General Unreserved - 4
2. Sleeper Class - 6
3. AC 2nd Class - 1
4. AC 3rd Class - 5

== Traction ==
As the entire route is fully electrified as of oct 2026 it is hauled by a Royapuram Loco Shed-based WAP-7 electric locomotive from Tambaram to Rameswaram end to end.

== Notes ==
a. Runs daily in a week with both directions.

== See also ==
=== Trains from Tambaram ===
- Tambaram–Mangaluru Central Express
- Tambaram–Jasidih Ratna Express
- Rockfort Express
- Tambaram–Nagercoil Antyodaya Express
- Cholan Express

=== Trains from Rameswaram ===
- Rameswaram–Bhubaneswar Express
- Rameswaram–Faizabad Shraddha Sethu Express
- Rameswaram–Tirupathi Meenakshi Express
- Rameswaram–Kanniyakumari Superfast Express
- Firozpur–Rameswaram Humsafar Express
