= Indo-Ceylon Boat Mail Express =

Train in India

Boat Mail Express
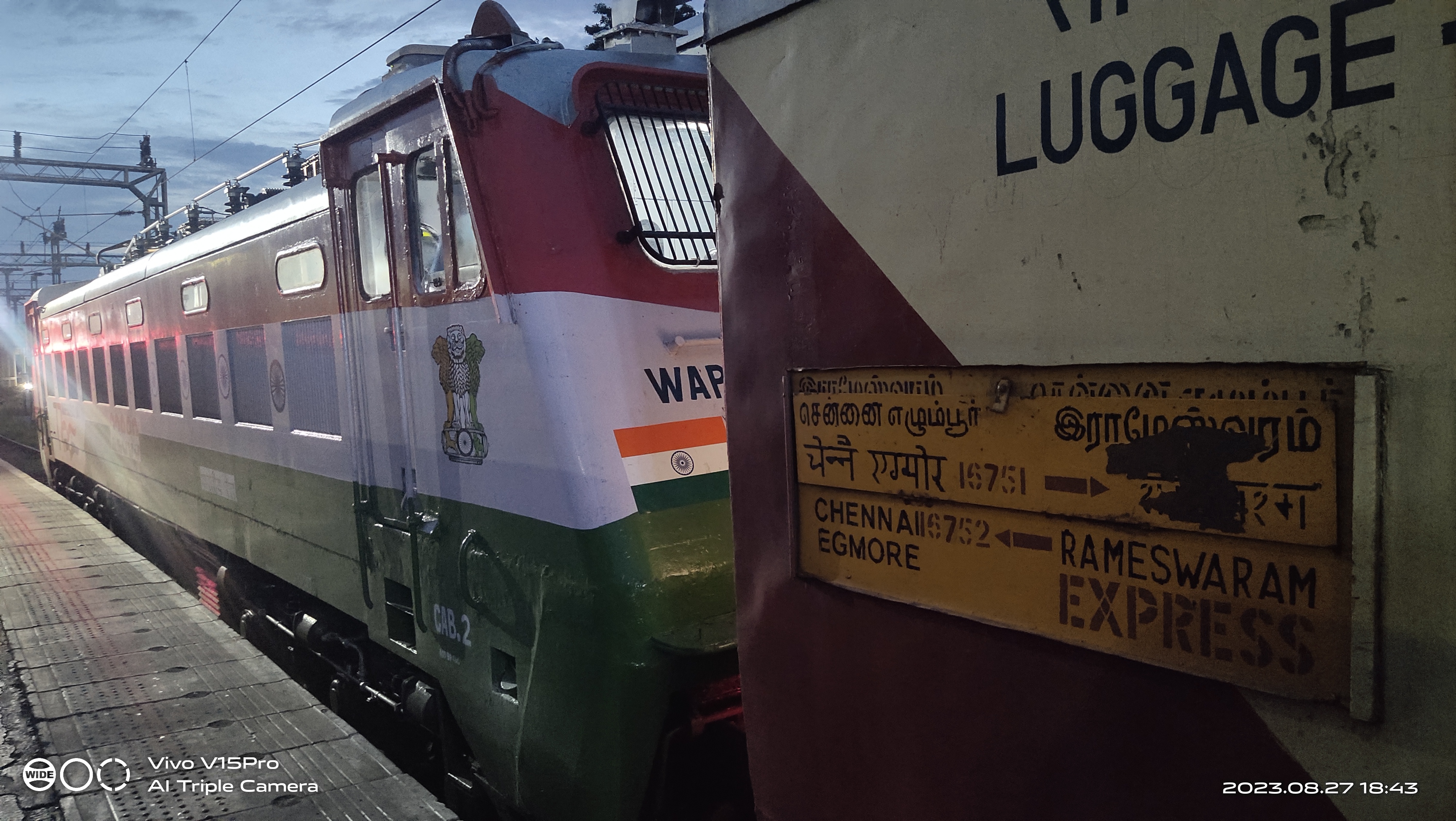
- Boat Mail Express at Chennai Egmore Railway Station Platform No. 9

Overview
- Service type: Mail/Express
- System: Indian Railways
- Status: Active
- Locale: Tamil Nadu
- Predecessor: Indo-Ceylon Express, Boat Mail Express
- First service: 24 February 1914; 112 years ago
- Last service: Operation till now
- Successor: Rameswaram Express
- Current operator: Southern Railway (Indian Railways)
- Former operators: South Indian Railway (SIR) & Ceylon Government Railway (CGR)
- Ridership: Mail/express
- Website: http://www.indianrailways.gov.in

Route
- Termini: Chennai Egmore (MS); Rameswaram (RMM)
- Stops: 20
- Distance travelled: 665 km (413 mi)
- Average journey time: 12 hours 30 minutes
- Service frequency: Daily
- Train number: 16751/16752
- Line used: Main Line

On-board services
- Classes: 1 1st A/C I tire (H); 1 2nd A/C II tire (A); 3 3rd A/C III tire (B); 13 sleeper (SL); 3 unreserved (GS); 2 GSLRD
- Disabled access: Disabled access
- Seating arrangements: Yes (un-reserved compartment)
- Sleeping arrangements: Yes (berth)
- Catering facilities: E-catering: 16751: (Chennai Egmore ➡ Villupuram Junction); 16752: (MANDAPAM ➡ Tiruchchirappalli Junction)
- Observation facilities: Large windows
- Entertainment facilities: No
- Baggage facilities: Available
- Other facilities: Bio toilet

Technical
- Rolling stock: Locomotive: WAP 4 (AJJ); Bogie:ICF coach
- Track gauge: 1,676 mm (5 ft 6 in)
- Electrification: 25 kV AC, 50 Hz (high voltage traction)
- Operating speed: 59 km/h (37 mph)
- Average length: 23 Coaches
- Depots: Chennai & Thiruvananthapuram
- Track owner: Southern Railway
- Rake maintenance: Chennai Egmore
- Rake sharing: Amritha Express
Route map
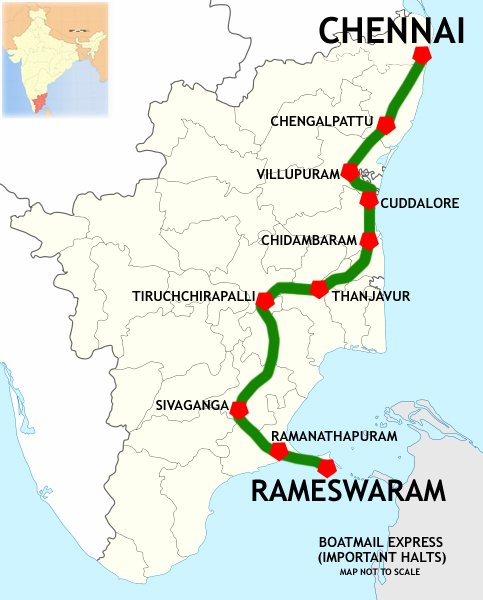

The Rameswaram (Boat Mail) Express, formerly known as the Boat Mail or Indo-Ceylon Express, is an express train connecting Rameswaram with the Tamil Nadu state capital Chennai via Tambaram, Chengalpattu, Melmaruvathur, Viluppuram, Cuddalore Port, Chidambaram, Sirkazhi, Mayiladuthurai, Thanjavur, Tiruchchirappalli, Pudukkottai, Karaikudi, Sivagangai, Manamadurai, Paramakkudi, and Ramanathapuram.

In the 20th century, it operated as a combined train-steamer ferry-train service between India and Sri Lanka, linking Chennai and Colombo, the capital of modern-day Sri Lanka (then Ceylon). Initially, the service utilized a rail-to-sea operation, which later evolved into a rail-sea-rail operation. Passengers could purchase a single ticket for the entire journey from Chennai to Colombo.

After Indian independence, the ferry service was discontinued and the train operated under the name Dhanushkodi Express from Chennai Egmore to Dhanushkodi. Following the destruction of Dhanushkodi in the cyclone of 1964, the train service on Rameswaram-Dhanushkodi section was completely halted due to the destruction of the complete section between Pamban Junction and Dhanushkodi and now runs only from Chennai Egmore up to Rameswaram.

== History ==
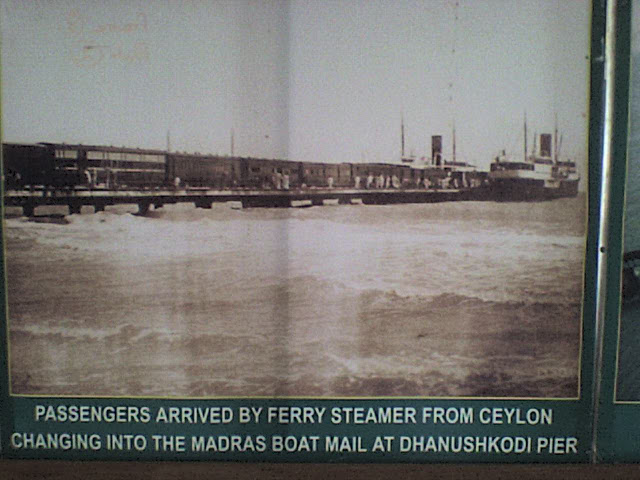
Passengers changing their mode of journey at Dhanushkodi

The train's name commemorates the 19th-century mail service between Tamil Nadu and Sri Lanka (then Ceylon). One of Indian Railways' most prestigious trains, it completed 100 years of service in 2014. Before the cyclone, it was running as a metre-gauge train from Chennai Egmore to Dhanushkodi via Chengalpattu Junction, Viluppuram Junction, Cuddalore Port Junction, Chidambaram, Mayiladuthurai Junction, Kumbakonam, Thanjavur Junction, Pudukkottai, Karaikkudi Junction, Devakottai, Sivagangai, Manamadurai Junction, Ramanathapuram, and Rameswaram.

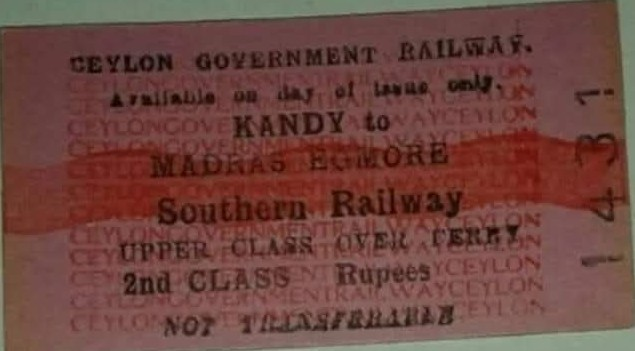
METER GAUGE INDO-CEYLON BOATMAIL EXPRESS SINGLE JOURNEY TICKET BY CEYLON GOVERNMENT RAILWAY AND SOUTHERN RAILWAY. TICKET BOOKED BETWEEN KANDY AND MADRAS

Due to the conversion of metre gauge to broad gauge, the train service was stopped. After completion of the broad-gauge track on the Chennai–Madurai–Rameswaram line, the train was resumed via Madurai Junction. Later, with the conversion of the Tiruchirappalli–Manamadurai line, the train was rerouted via that line, skipping Madurai. Finally, once the Mayiladuthurai-Thanjavur line was converted to broad gauge, the train was rerouted via Thanjavur, which is the present route of the Boat Mail Express.

=== Tuticorin–Colombo era ===
Before the commencement of the boat mail train service to the island territory, mail services were transferred between the British colonies of India and Ceylon via Jaffna (Kankesanthurai) and Point Calimere (Kodiyarkarai) through ferry and from there, the mail were transferred to Negapatnam (Nagapattinam) by land transport and from there it is transported through the existing railway services. Once the railway track works completed till Tuticorin, A fast train service was inaugurated on January 1, 1880 which is named as Boat Mail. The railway portion of the route within India was from Madras (Chennai) to Tuticorin, a journey of 21 hours and 50 minutes. At Tuticorin, passengers embarked on the boat mail steamer to Colombo in Ceylon. The Boat Mail Express was one of the early trains to get vestibuled carriages, in 1898.

Presently, this route runs as the Pearl City Express.

=== Dhanushkodi–Talaimannar era ===
In 1914, after the Pamban Bridge was built, the train's route changed and went from Madras to Dhanushkodi. A much shorter ferry service then took the passengers to Talaimannar in Ceylon, from where another train went to Colombo. The 35 km (22-mi) long ferry journey was considerably shorter than the 270-km (170-mi) long Tuticorin-Colombo route.

Since the 1930s, this train has been rerouted from its original route via Madurai Junction to its present-day route due to the opening of the Trichinopoly–Manamadurai railway route, which is a shorter distance in comparison with its original route and thus also shorter in overall travel time.

=== Post-cyclone ===
During the 1964 cyclone, a passenger train (numbered 653) ran between Pamban Junction and Dhanushkodi was washed into the sea by huge Strom surge waves while it was approaching close to Dhanushkodi (with just on approx. Of 2.5 kilometres on approach to Dhanushkodi railway station). The railway tracks and the pier at Dhanushkodi were also destroyed completely and the empty wagons of stationed at Dhanushkodi was completely cutoff and isolated from the Indian Railways network. The ferry service ships (which was operated by the Southern Railway till 1964) named T.S.S Gorshen Ran aground at Talaimannar Pier at srilanka whereas at the other side, the captain of the T.S.S Irwin which was stationed at Dhanushkodi that day, noticed the violent sea at Dhanushkodi and ordered the crew members to fall back the empty vessel into the sea else the ship may go aground. Later railway authorities tried hard to salvage and repair the T.S.S Gorshen but all attempts gone in vein. Later with no options leftout, the ship has been dismantled at Thalaimannar. The steamer Irwin continued working the India-Ceylon service (which is later renamed as M.V. Ramanujan). From March 1966, the steamer started plying between Rameswaram and Talaimannar, and Southern railway handed over the Steamer and the ferry service to the Shipping corporation of India. The Pamban bridge which links Mandapam (mainland India) with Pamban island was completely destroyed and only the bascule alone remained intact. Later the bridge has been restored within 45 days and Following this, the Indian portion of the train service now operates only up to Rameswaram, and the ferry service to Talaimannar restarted from Rameswaram.

Post Cyclone, the official timetable release of the Southern Railway doesn't have the information of the departure time/arrival time at Colombo Fort or at Thalaimannar Pier and the timetables were released only upto Rameswaram but the ferry service is operated in both ends why because the ferry operation has been transferred from the Indian Railways to the Shipping Corporation of India. Due to the change in the organizational operating system, the timetables changed accordingly. The train service was discontinued from 1984 due to the Tamil Eelam issue. It now runs between Chennai Egmore and Rameswaram via Tambaram, Chengalpattu Junction, Viluppuram Junction, Cuddalore Port Junction, Chidambaram, Mayiladuthurai Junction, Kumbakonam, Thanjavur Junction, Tiruchirappalli Junction, Pudukkottai, Karaikkudi Junction, Devakottai Road, Kallal, Sivaganga, Manamadurai Junction, and Ramanathapuram on the Indian end, where it runs as Colombo–Talaimannar Night Mail Express at the Sri Lankan end.

== Schedule ==
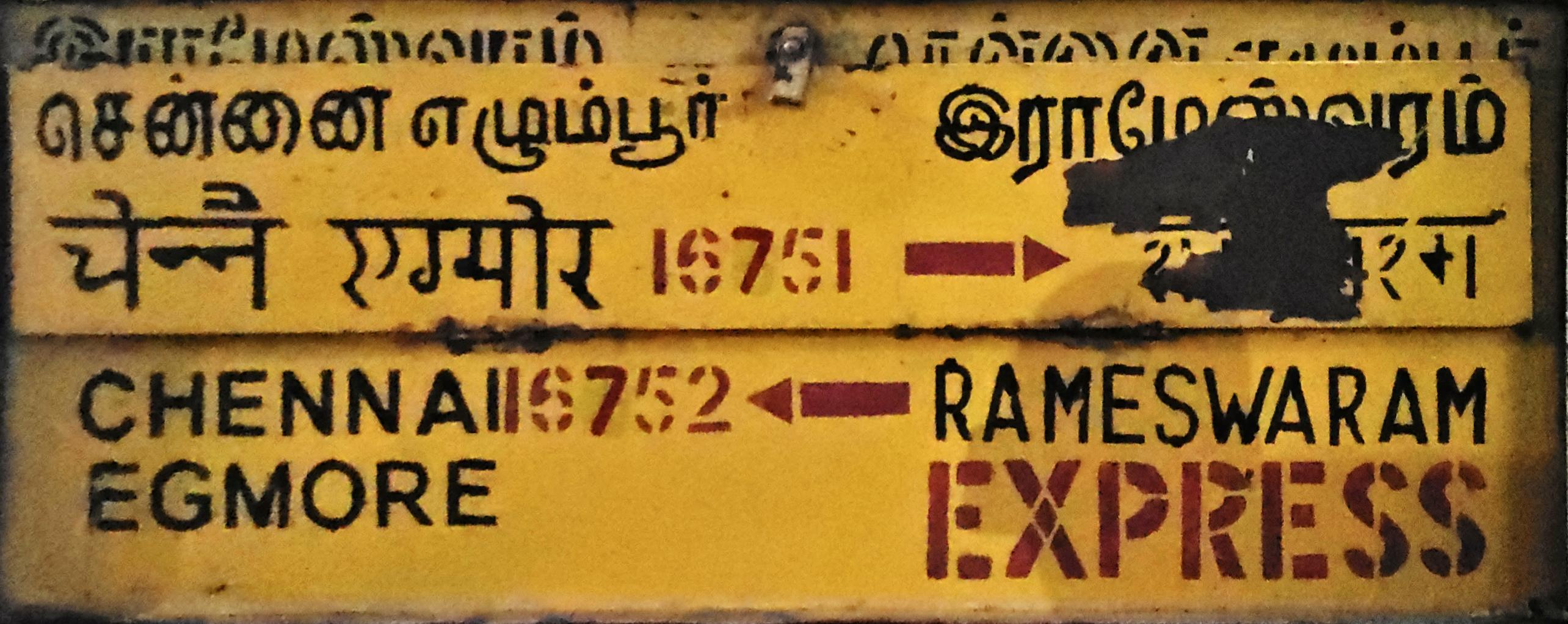
Train name board

- 16751—Leaves Chennai Egmore daily at 19:15 IST and reaches Rameswaram the next day at 08:10 am IST.
- 16752—Leaves Rameswaram every day at 17:25 IST and reaches Chennai Egmore the next morning at 07:25 am IST.

16751 - Chennai Egmore → Rameswaram ~ Rameswaram (Boat Mail) Express
Station/junction name	Station code	Arrival	Departure	Day
Chennai Egmore	MS	Source	19:15	1
Tambaram	TBM	19:43	19:45	1
Chengalpattu Junction	CGL	20:13	20:15	1
Melmaruvathur	MLMR	20:38	20:40	1
Villupuram Junction	VM	21:50	21:55	1
Cuddalore Port Junction	CUPJ	22:38	22:40	1
Chidambaram	CDM	23:08	23:10	1
Sirkazhi	SY	23:26	23:27	1
Mayiladuthurai Junction	MV	23:55	23:57	1
Kumbakonam	KMU	00:25	00:27	2
Thanjavur Junction	TJ	01:00	01:02	2
Tiruchchirappalli Junction	TPJ	02:50	03:00	2
Pudukottai	PDKT	03:43	03:45	2
Karaikkudi Junction	KKDI	04:10	04:12	2
Devakottai Road	DKO	04:19	04:20	2
Sivaganga	SVGA	04:39	04:30	2
Manamadurai Junction	MNM	05:35	05:40	2
Paramakkudi	PMK	06:03	06:05	2
Ramanathapuram	RMD	06:30	06:32	2
Mandapam	MMM	07:08	07:09	2
Pamban	PBM	07:22	07:23	2
Rameswaram	RMM	08:20	DEST	2
16752 - Rameswaram → Chennai Egmore ~ Rameswaram (Boat Mail) Express
Rameswaram	RMM	SOURCE	17:25	1
Pamban	RMD	17:41	17:42	1
Mandapam	MMM	17:53	17:55	1
Ramanathapuram	RMD	18:18	18:20	1
Paramakkudi	PMK	18:43	18:45	1
Manamadurai Junction	MNM	19:20	19:25	1
Sivaganga	SVGA	19:38	19:40	1
Kallal	KAL	19:54	19:55	1
Devakottai Road	DKO	20:03	20:04	1
Karaikkudi Junction	KKDI	20:38	20:40	1
Pudukottai	PDKT	21:09	21:10	1
Tiruchchirappalli Junction	TPJ	23:00	23:10	1
Thanjavur Junction	TJ	00:00	00:02	1
Kumbakonam	KMU	00:34	00:36	2
Mayiladuthurai Junction	MV	01:13	01:15	2
Sirkazhi	SY	01:37	01:35	2
Chidambaram	CDM	01:54	01:56	2
Cuddalore Port Junction	CUPJ	02:25	02:26	2
Villupuram Junction	VM	04:20	04:25	2
Melmaruvathur	MLMR	05:13	05:15	2
Chengalpattu Junction	CGL	05:48	05:50	2
Tambaram	TBM	06:18	06:20	2
Mambalam	MBM	06:38	06:40	2
Chennai Egmore	MS	07:25	DEST	2

== Traction ==
In earlier times, the train was hauled by a Golden Rock-based WDG-3A. From Rameswaram to Chennai Egmore, the train is hauled by a WAP-4 electric loco. The same locomotive types are used on the return journey. This train achieves a maximum speed of 110 km/h.

== Coach composition ==
The train consists of 23 coaches. It shares its rails with the Sethu Superfast Express, operates daily, and covers a distance of 667 km (414 mi).

It includes one AC first class cum 2nd AC (HA), AC 2 tier (A), AC 3 tier (B), sleeper class (SL), unreserved general sitting coach (GS), and end on generators (SLRD). The train will share its rake with Madurai–Thiruvananthapuram Amritha Express after the extension and inauguration of the new Pamban Bridge.

Loco	1	2	3	4	5	6	7	8	9	10	11	12	13	14	15	16	17	18	19	20	21	22	23
	SLR	GS	GS	S1	S2	S3	S4	S5	S6	S7	S8	S9	S10	S11	S12	S13	B3	B2	B1	A1	HA1	GS	SLR

== Alternative bridge proposal ==
At one time, the South Indian Railway considered constructing a bridge 12 mi (19 km)-long across the shallow waters, sand shoals, and reefs known as Ram Setu between India and Sri Lanka. However, this plan was shelved when World War I broke out.

== Locomotive ==
- The Rameswaram (Boat Mail) Express Now runs from Chennai to Rameswaram with a WAP-4 locomotive from Erode,Arakkonam After Completing Electrification work at Thiruchirapalli Junction - Rameswaram railway line

== See also ==
- Alavandar murder case, incidence in Boat Mail Express
- Cross-border railway lines in India
- List of named passenger trains of Sri Lanka
- Rail transport in India
  - Passenger trains in Tamil Nadu
    - Ananthapuri Express
    - Chendur Superfast Express
    - Chennai Egmore-Nagercoil Weekly Superfast Express
    - Kanniyakumari Superfast Express
    - Nellai Superfast Express
    - Pallavan Superfast Express
    - Pandian Superfast Express
    - Pearl City (Muthunagar) Superfast Express
    - Pothigai Superfast Express
    - Rockfort (Malaikottai) Superfast Express
    - Uzhavan Express
    - Vaigai Superfast Express
