= Rameswaram–Manduadih Express =

Passenger train in India

Rameshwaram–Banaras Weekly Superfast Express
Overview
- Service type: Express
- First service: 9 May 2010; 14 years ago
- Current operator(s): North Eastern Railway

Route
- Termini: Rameswaram (RMM); Banaras (BSBS)
- Stops: 32
- Distance travelled: 2,791 km (1,734 mi)
- Average journey time: 48 hours 40 minutes
- Service frequency: Weekly
- Train number(s): 22535 / 22536

On-board services
- Class(es): AC 2 tier, AC 3 tier, Sleeper Class, General Unreserved
- Seating arrangements: Yes
- Sleeping arrangements: Yes
- Catering facilities: On-board catering, E-catering
- Observation facilities: Large windows
- Baggage facilities: No
- Other facilities: Below the seats

Technical
- Rolling stock: LHB coach
- Track gauge: 1,676 mm (5 ft 6 in)
- Operating speed: 57 km/h (35 mph) average including halts.
Route map
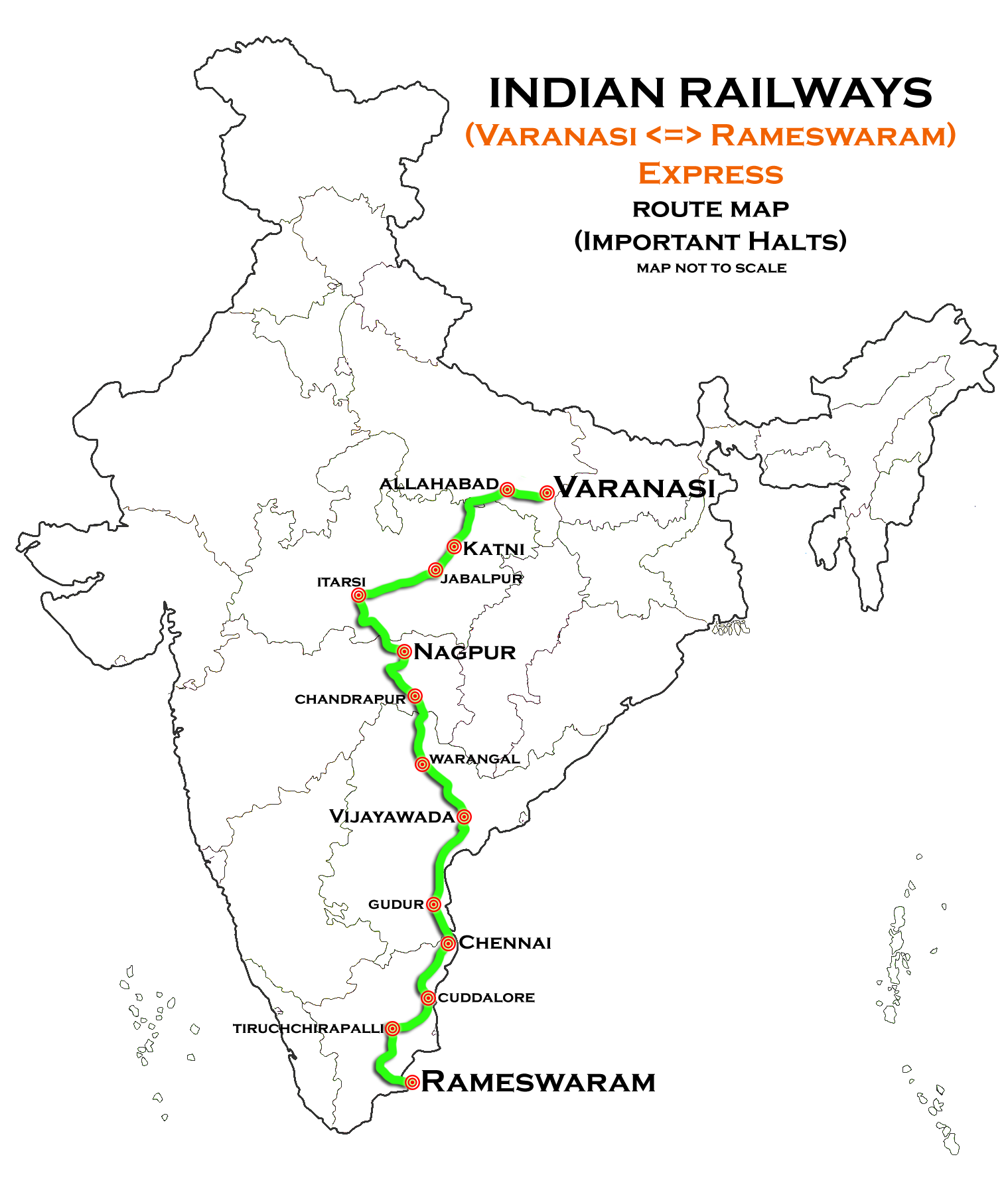

The 22535 / 22536 Rameswaram–Banaras Weekly Superfast Express is an Express train belonging to Indian Railways – North Eastern Railway zone that runs between Rameswaram and Banaras in India.

It operates as train number 22535 from Rameswaram to Banaras and as train number 22536 in the reverse direction, serving the states of Tamil Nadu, Andhra Pradesh, Telangana, Maharashtra, Madhya Pradesh & Uttar Pradesh.

== Coaches ==
The 22536 / 22536 Rameswaram–Banaras Express has one AC 2 tier, Eight AC 3 tier, five Sleeper Class, six General Unreserved and 2 EOG coaches. It doesn't carry a pantry car. Now it had been provided with LHB coaches (Link Hofmann coaches) from 09/09/2018. It became the first train to run with LHB coaches on the century old Pamban Bridge and followed by Rameswaram Humsafar Express at the end of the same month and so on.

As is customary with most train services in India, coach composition may be amended at the discretion of Indian Railways depending on demand.

== Service ==
The 22535 Rameswaram–Banaras Express covers the distance of 2,791.2 km (1,734 mi) in 49 hours 30 mins (54 km/h) and in 51 hours as 22536 Manduadih-Rameswaram Express (52 km/h).

As the average speed of the train is lower than 55 km/h (34 mph), as per Indian Railways rules, its fare doesn't includes an express surcharge.

== Schedule ==
Train number	Station code	Departure station	Departure time	Departure day	Arrival station code	Arrival Station Name	Arrival time	Arrival day
22535	RMM	Rameswaram	23:55	Wednesday	BSBS	Banaras	01:25 AM	Saturday
22536	BSBS	Banaras	20:00	Sunday	RMM	Rameswaram	23.00	Wednesday

== Routing ==
The 22535 / 22536 Rameswaram–Banaras Express runs from Rameswaram via Manamadurai Junction, Sivaganga, Devakottai Road, Karaikkudi Junction, Tiruchirappalli Junction, Thanjavur Junction, Kumbakonam, Mayiladuthurai Junction, Sirkazhi, Chidambaram, Viluppuram Junction, Chennai Egmore, Gudur Junction, Vijayawada Junction, Warangal, Ramagundam, Balharshah Junction, Nagpur Junction, Itarsi Junction, Jabalpur Junction, Satna, Katni Junction, Prayagraj Junction to Banaras.

== Traction ==
As large sections of the route are yet to be fully electrified, a Golden Rock Loco Shed-based WDP-4D diesel locomotive powers the train up to Tiruchirappalli Junction, then a Kanpur Loco Shed-based WAP-7 electric locomotive pulls the train to its destination.
