= Firozpur–Rameswaram Humsafar Express =

Train in India

Firozpur Cantonment–Rameswaram Humsafar Express
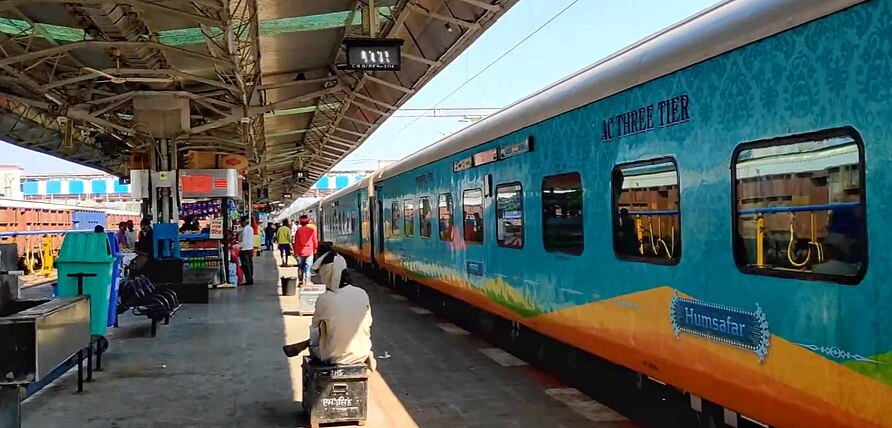
- Firozpur Cantt.–Rameswaram Humsafar Express at Itarsi Junction.

Overview
- Service type: Humsafar Express
- Locale: Punjab, Haryana Rajasthan, Madhya Pradesh, Maharashtra, Telangana, Andhra Pradesh & Tamil Nadu
- First service: 2 October 2018; 8 years ago (Inaugural) (Note: Scheduled date of commencement); 3 October 2023; 3 years ago (extended up to Firozpur Cantonment)
- Current operator: Northern Railway

Route
- Termini: Firozpur Cantt. (FZR); Rameswaram (RMM)
- Stops: 41
- Distance travelled: 3,544 km (2,202 mi)
- Average journey time: 60 hours (Approx.)
- Service frequency: Weekly (Note: Train.No.20973 on Saturdays and Train.No.20974 on Tuesdays)
- Train number: 20973 / 20974
- Lines used: Ajmer–Bhopal Line (AII – BPL); Bhopal–Nagpur section (BPL – NGP); Nagpur–Hyderabad line (NGP – KZT); Kazipet–Vijayawada section (KZT – BZA); Vijayawada–Gudur section (BZA – GDR); Gudur–Chennai section (GDR – KOK); North Line (KOK – MSB); South Line (MSB – VM); Chord Line (VM – TPJ); Tiruchirappalli–Manamadurai Line (TPJ – MNM); Manamadurai–Rameswaram branch line (MNM – RMM)

On-board services
- Classes: Sixteen AC 3-tier; One Pantry car; Two EOG cars
- Disabled access: Disabled access
- Seating arrangements: No
- Sleeping arrangements: Couchette car
- Catering facilities: On-board Catering
- Observation facilities: Large windows
- Baggage facilities: Overhead racks Baggage carriage
- Other facilities: Below the seats

Technical
- Rolling stock: LHB Humsafar
- Track gauge: 1,676 mm (5 ft 6 in)
- Electrification: 25 kV AC, 50 Hz
- Operating speed: 57 km/h (35 mph)
- Rake maintenance: Firozpur Cantonment

The 20498 / 20497 Firozpur Cantonment–Rameswaram Humsafar Express is an express train of the Indian Railways connecting Firozpur Cantonment with Rameswaram. It is currently being operated with 20973/20974 train numbers on a weekly basis. After its extension from Ajmer to Firozpur, It became as the Longest Running Humsafar category train by just surpassing SMVT Bangalore Agartala Humsafar express. And also became as 5th longest train service by Indian Railways.

== Background ==
The inaugural service, bearing train number No.09603 of this service was launched on 27 September 2018 at (Laxmibai Nagar Junction) by Speaker of the Lok Sabha, Sumitra Mahajan. The regular services are scheduled to commencing from 2 October 2018 at Rameswaram on every Tuesdays and 6 October 2018 at Ajmer Junction on every Saturdays bearing train numbers 20974 and 20973 respectively. It was then extended to Firozpur Cantonment from 2 October 2023.

== Rakes ==
The service is completely fitted with 3-tier AC coaches designed by Indian Railways with features like LED screen display to show information about stations, train speed and will have announcement system as well, Vending machines for tea, coffee and milk, Bio toilets in compartments as well as CCTV cameras. Apart from 16 AC 3-tier coaches earmarked for passengers, the train will also have 1 Pantry Car and 2 End-on Generator coaches. Earlier was WDM-3A pull it now WAP-7 take a turn to pull it regularly.

== Route ==
This weekly service originates every Saturday traverses about 3,431 km (2,132 mi) through Bathinda Junction,Mandi Dabwali, Hanumangarh Junction, Sadulpur Junction, Churu Junction, Sikar Junction, Ringas Junction, Jaipur Junction, Ajmer Junction, Chittaurgarh Junction, Ratlam Junction, Fatehabad Chandrawatiganj Junction, Laxmibai Nagar Junction (Indore Suburban), (Note: The service reverses its rakes to continue the journey.) Dewas Junction, Bhopal Junction, Itarsi Junction, Nagpur Junction, Balharshah Junction, Vijayawada Junction, Gudur Junction, Chennai Egmore, Viluppuram Junction,Tiruchirappalli Junction and Manamadurai Junction reaching on Tuesdays. On the return journey, it leaves the same Tuesday traverses the same route and reaches Firozpur Cantonment on Fridays. It takes 62 hours approximately to completely the service at a rate of 57 km/h (35 mph).

== Developments ==
There are also demands for this train to make a stop at Ramanathapuram, Paramakudi, Sivagangai Karaikudi Junction and Vriddhachalam Junction as it runs with low patronage between Chennai Egmore and Rameswaram.

== See also ==
- Sri Ganganagar – Tiruchirappalli Humsafar Express
- Ajmer Junction railway station
- Rameswaram railway station
