= Amritha Express =

Train in India

Overview
- Service type: Express
- Locale: Tamil Nadu & Kerala
- First service: 1 January 2001; 25 years ago
- Current operator: Southern Railway

Route
- Termini: Thiruvananthapuram Central (TVC); Rameswaram (RMM)
- Stops: 27
- Distance travelled: 717 km (446 mi)
- Average journey time: 16 hours 15 minutes
- Service frequency: Daily
- Train number: 16343 / 16344

On-board services
- Classes: AC First Class, AC 2 Tier, AC 3 Tier, Sleeper Class, General Unreserved.
- Seating arrangements: Yes
- Sleeping arrangements: Yes
- Auto-rack arrangements: Overhead racks
- Catering facilities: On-board catering, E-catering
- Observation facilities: Large windows
- Baggage facilities: Available
- Other facilities: Below the seats

Technical
- Rolling stock: ICF coach
- Track gauge: 1,676 mm (5 ft 6 in)
- Operating speed: 47 km/h (29 mph) average including halts.

The 16343 / 16344 Amritha Express is an express train operated by the Southern Railway zone of the Indian Railways. It run between Thiruvananthapuram Central in Kerala and Rameswaram in Tamil Nadu.

At first, it was extended from Palakkad to Palakkad Town, then later extended up to Pollachi, then Madurai, and the fourth time it was extended to Rameswaram. This train marks as the direct connectivity train to Palani & Rameswaram from Kerala benefiting Malayali pilgrims to Palani Dhandayuthapani Swamy Temple and Rameswaram Ramanathaswamy Temple. This train also connects the towns of Pollachi, Palani and Dindigul in Tamil Nadu directly to Rameswaram. Therefore, this train will be a greatest benefit for the passengers en route.

== Background ==
It was introduced in January 2001 by the then Railway Minister O. Rajagopal, from Thiruvananthapuram Central to Palakkad Town. This train is named after Mata Amritanandamayi, a well known spiritual leader of Kerala. At first, the train used to run between Thiruvananthapuram Central to Palakkad, then extended up to Pollachi, then extended to Madurai Junction and finally to Rameswaram. It starts from Thiruvananthapuram Central, runs via Kollam Junction, Kayamkulam Junction, Chengannur, Tiruvalla, Changanasseri, Kottayam, Ernakulam Town, Aluva, Thrissur, Ottapalam, Palakkad Junction, Palakkad Town, Kollengode, Pollachi Junction, Udumalaipettai, Palani, Dindigul Junction, Madurai Junction, Manamadurai Junction, Paramakudi, Ramanathapuram, then reaches Rameswaram the next day.

== History ==
It was first introduced as Thiruvananthapuram Central–Palakkad Town Amritha Express, via Shoranur Junction. Later, from November 2015, it had been extended and operated as a special express between Palakkad Town and Pollachi Junction.

Then, from 1 November 2017, Amritha Express was extended to Madurai Junction with new stops at Kollengode, Pollachi, Udumalaipettai, Palani, Oddanchatram and Dindigul Junction by withdrawing stoppage at Shoranur Junction. Starting from 16 November 2011, at Shoranur Junction, eight coaches from Nilambur Road was linked with Amritha Express and ran as Thiruvananthapuram Central–Madurai Junction Amritha Express / Thiruvananthapuram Central–Nilambur Road Rajya Rani Express.

On 5 May 2019, the link express from Nilambur Road was discontinued permanently, and both the trains ran as an independent train. Also Amritha Express was diverted to run via Palakkad Junction–Ottapalam–Thrissur instead of Palakkad Junction–Shoranur Junction–Ottapalam–Thrissur. Therefore, Amritha Express will not touch Shoranur Junction, instead it will bypass Shoranur Junction. The link train Rajya Rani Express has got independent coaches and running from the new terminal in Kochuveli to Nilambur Road.

From October 16, 2025, Amritha Express was further extended to Rameswaram.

== Locomotive ==
After electrification of Madurai Junction - Palani - Pollachi Junction - Palakkad railway line, this train uses Arakkonam Electric Loco shed based WAP 4 locomotive from Rameswaram to Palakkad Junction & WAP 7 locomotive from Palakkad Junction to Thiruvananthapuram Central. WAP 7 Loco Hauls From Thiruvananthapuram Central to Palakkad Junction & Wap 4 (Rarely) Takes Charge from Palakkad Junction to Rameswaram.

== Timings ==
This train is a daily service train with the following departures and arrivals at some of these stations:-

Thiruvananthapuram Central ↔ Rameswaram
16343		Station Name	Station Code	16344	
Arrival	Departure	Station Name	Station Code	Arrival	Departure
-	20:30	Thiruvananthapuram Central	TVC	04:55	-
21:32	21:35	Kollam Junction	QLN	02:47	02:50
22:38	22:40	Chengannur	CNGR	01:41	01:43
00:30	00:35	Ernakulam Town	ERN	00:02	00:07
00:46	00:47	Idappally	IPL	23:47	23:48
03:40	04:10	Palakkad Junction	PGT	20:30	20:55
05:37	05:40	Pollachi Junction	POY	19:02	19:05
06:42	06:45	Palani	PLNI	18:02	18:05
08:35	08:40	Dindigul Junction	DG	17:05	17:10
09:50	09:55	Madurai Junction	MDU	16:05	16:10
10:25	10:30	Manamadurai Junction	MNM	15:05	15:10
11:13	11:15	Ramanathapuram	RMD	14:13	14:15
12:45	-	Rameswaram	RMM	-	14:30 (return journey departure time )

== Coach composition ==
- 1 First class Ac
- 1 AC Two Tier,
- 3 AC Three Tier,
- 12 Sleeper class,
- 4 General Unreserved,
- 2 Luggage cum Disabled coach.

The Train shares rake with Boat Mail Express with effect from 2025 April 14.The Both Trains are Expected to Upgrade to LHB Coach this year

Loco	1	2	3	4	5	6	7	8	9	10	11	12	13	14	15	16	17	18	19	20	21	22	23
	SLR	UR	UR	S1	S2	S3	S4	S5	S6	S7	S8	S9	S10	S11	S12	HA1	A1	B1	B2	B3	UR	UR	SLR
