= Dhanushkodi railway station =

Abandoned railway station in Tamil Nadu, India

Dhanushkodi
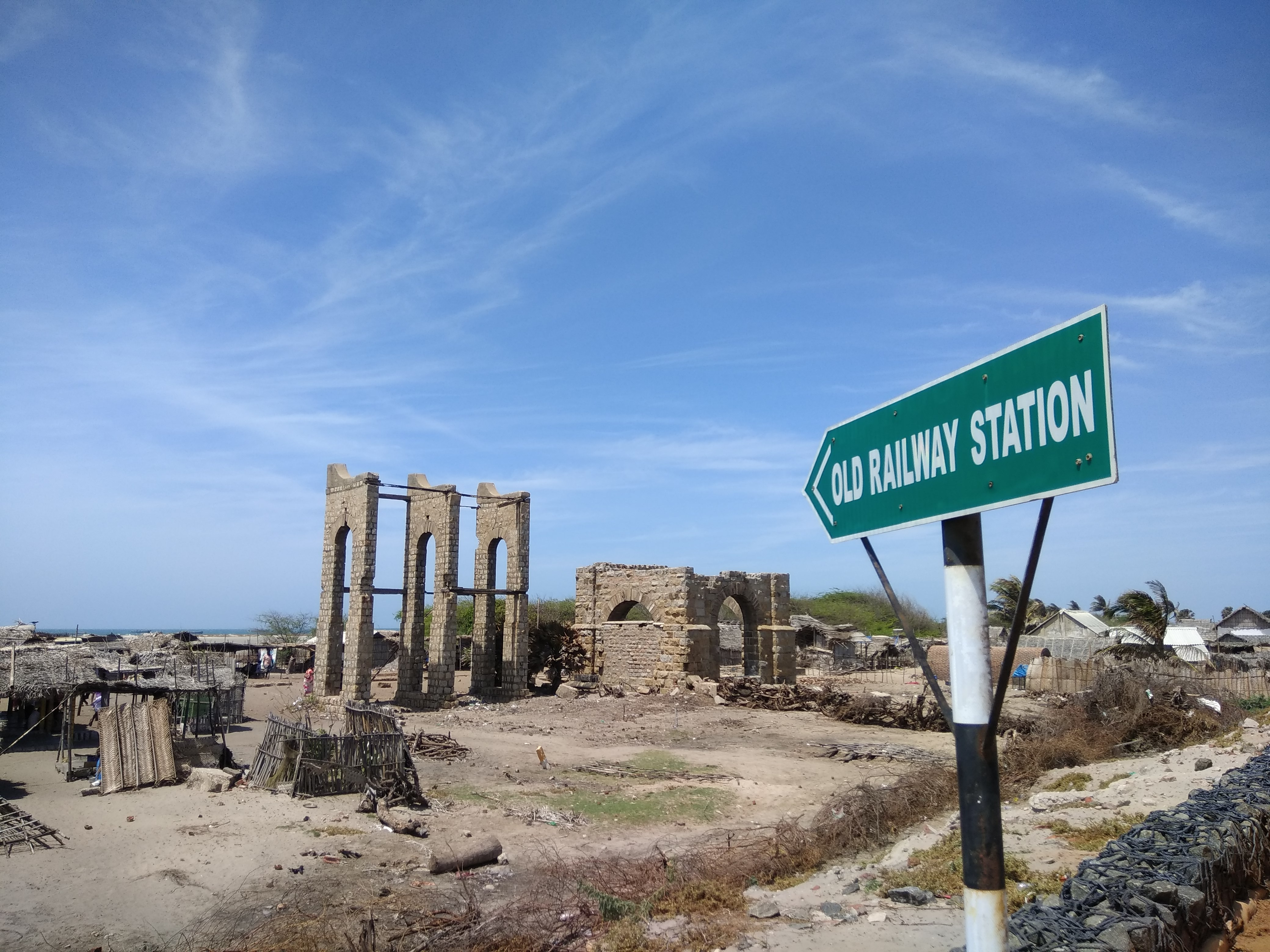
- Heritage building of Dhanushkodi's old railway station

General information
- Location: India
- Coordinates: 9.1793°N 79.4157°E
- Owner: Indian Railways
- Operator: Madurai railway division
- Line: Manamadurai–Rameswaram branch line
- Platforms: 2
- Tracks: 3
- Train operators: Southern Railway
- Connections: Bus, Auto

Construction
- Structure type: on ground station
- Parking: Yes
- Cycle facilities: Yes

Other information
- Station code: DSK
- Zone(s): Southern Railway
- Division(s): Madurai
- Fare zone: Southern Railway

History
- Closed: 22 December 1964; 61 years ago (immediately after the cyclone)
Route map
Location
- Location within Tamil Nadu Location within India

Dhanushkodi railway station is an abandoned railway station in Tamil Nadu, India. It was abandoned during the 1964 Rameswaram cyclone. It is one of the two branch lines gets diverted from Pamban Junction one is Pamban Junction–Rameswaram Branch line and the other is Pamban Junction–Dhanushkodi Branch line. A train called Indo-Ceylon Boat Mail express went from Madras(now Chennai) Egmore Station to Colombo, Ceylon(now Sri Lanka) with a halt at Dhanushkodi station. It was the prime and most economic way to reach Ceylon.

== Cyclone and Aftermath ==
In 23 December 1964, the 1964 Rameswaram cyclone had struck the town of Dhanushkodi. The town was submerged and both lines of the station got destroyed in that cyclone. At the same time Pamban - Dhanushkodi Train(Train No. 653) overturned at the Pamban bridge killing 200 passengers of the train. Immediately after the cyclone, Rameswaram branch line was constructed and opened to traffic but Dhanushkodi branch line was left abandoned.

As of now Madurai railway division maintained the station till its operation in 1964. It had 2 platforms, 3 tracks and are now left with open remnants left to see for tourists visiting Dhanushkodi.

== Restoration ==
As of April 2025, the plan for restoration of 17 km Rameswaram-Dhanushkodi rail line from New Pamban Bridge till Dhanushkodi railway station have been approved but facing delays due to environmental and other clearances pending with the state government. There is also a proposal since 1914 to extend the rail line to Sri Lanka to connect to existing Talaimannar Pier railway station on Mannar line via a 23 km long over-water rail bridge parallel to Ram Setu.

== See also ==
- List of railway stations in India
