= Alavandar murder case =

1950s criminal case in India

- Location: Madras Presidency, India
- Date: August 28, 1952
- Attack type: Murder
- Weapon: Knife
- Deaths: 1 (C. Alavandar)
- Victim: C. Alavandarh
- Motive: Revenge and illicit affair
- Accused: Prabhakar Menon, Devaki Menon
- Charges: Murder under Indian Penal Code Section 302
- Verdict: Prabhakar Menon – Guilty; Devaki Menon – Acquitted
- Convictions: Prabhakar Menon – Guilty of culpable homicide not amounting to murder
- Case received widespread media coverage in India in the early 1950s

The Alavandar murder case is a murder trial which was conducted in the Madras State, India in the early 1950s. The cause of the trial was the murder of a businessman and ex-serviceman named Alavandar whose headless body was found in one of the coaches of the Indo-Ceylon Express. After a trial which became a cause célèbre, Alavandar's ex-lover and her husband were found guilty of the murder and had been sentenced to brief terms of imprisonment.

== Introduction ==
C. Alavandar, a pen salesman from Chennai was reported missing on 28 August 1952, by his employer kannan Chetty (the owner of Gem and Co). The next day a headless body was discovered in a third-class compartment of the Chennai-Dhanushkodi (Indo-Ceylon boatmail) express. It was found after passengers complained about a foul-smelling trunk when the train was nearing Manamadurai. Police investigating the complaint, opened the trunk and found the headless body. An autopsy done at Manamadurai concluded that the body belonged to a 25-year-old male. Since it was circumcised, the investigating police officer, K.Khaja Syed Mohideen, decided that the murder victim was a Muslim based on Circumcision (removal of the upper layer of the skin in male reproductive organ). After a few days, police discovered a severed head in Royapuram beach, Chennai. It had been buried in the beach sand but was exposed due to tidal action. The head and body were sent to Madras Medical College for forensic examination. Dr. C. P. Gopalakrishnan who performed the examination concluded that both belonged to the same 42-year-old male. Alavandar's wife later identified them as her husband. Alavandar had served in the British Indian army and his fingerprints were on file there. They were used to conclusively prove that the murdered man was Alavandar.

== Investigation and trial ==
The Police investigation into Alavandar's murder revealed the circumstances leading to his death. Alavandar belonged to the Komati Chetti community. In 1952, he was about 40–45 years of age and married with two children. Besides his pen shop at Parry's Corner, Chennai, Alavandar was a saree salesman. He was romantically involved with many women. One of them was Devaki Menon from Kerala. In 1951, Devaki broke off her relationship with Alavandar and married Prabhakar Menon. But Alavandar continued to harass her. To stop Alavandar, Devaki and Prabhakar decided to murder Alavandar. Devaki called Alavandar to her house at the cemetery road on 28 August 1952. There the couple murdered Alavandar, cut his head off and buried it at Royapuram beach in Chennai. They put the body in a trunk and left it in the Indo-Ceylon Express. Then they left Chennai for Bombay.

The couple was arrested in Bombay and brought to Chennai for trial. The trial caused a sensation and large crowds thronged the hearings. Lawyer B. T. Sundararajan, appearing for the defense, argued that it was a homicide and not murder as there had been "grave provocation". The jury found the defendants Devaki and Prabhakar guilty. On 13 August 1953, Justice A. S. Panchapakesa Iyer awarded a seven-year rigorous imprisonment sentence to Prabhakar for culpable homicide and sentenced Devaki to three years in prison.

== Impact ==
Prabhakara Menon and Devaki, eventually, served their sentences in jail and afterwards, moved to Kerala where they set up a tea shop and over the years they prospered and built a hotel Devaprabha in Palakkad, Kerala. The judge who handed down the comparatively mild sentence has often been accused of being sympathetic to the accused. This sensational case was considered an important one in the Indian forensics field and finds mention in medical textbooks. It was dramatised in Doordarshan.
