= Kizhakadaiyam railway station =

Railway station in Tamil Nadu, India

Kizhakadaiyam

General information
- Location: Tenkasi district, Tamil Nadu; India
- Coordinates: 8°49′07″N 77°22′51″E
- Elevation: 80 metres (260 ft)
- System: Indian Railway Station
- Owner: Southern Railway zone of the Indian Railways
- Operator: Southern Railway
- Platforms: 2
- Tracks: 2
- Connections: Auto rickshaw stand, taxi stand

Construction
- Structure type: Standard (on ground station)

Other information
- Status: Functioning
- Station code: KKY
- Zone(s): Southern Railway
- Division(s): Madurai

Services
Preceding station	Indian Railways	Following station
Mettur towards ?	Madurai railway division	Ravanasamudram towards ?
Location
- Location within India Location within Tamil Nadu

Kizhakadaiyam railway station (station code: KKY) belongs to the Madurai railway division. It has automated ticket vending.
