= Rameswaram–Faizabad Shraddha Sethu Express =

Train in India

Shraddha Setu Superfast Express

Overview
- Service type: Express
- First service: 27 July 2017; 9 years ago
- Current operator: Southern Railway

Route
- Termini: Rameswaram (RMM); Ayodhya Cantt Junction (AYC)
- Stops: 20
- Distance travelled: 2,921 km (1,815 mi)
- Average journey time: 53 hrs 45 mins
- Service frequency: Weekly
- Train number: 22613 / 22614

On-board services
- Classes: AC 2 Tier, AC 3 Tier, Sleeper Class, General Unreserved
- Seating arrangements: Yes
- Sleeping arrangements: Yes
- Catering facilities: Available
- Observation facilities: Large windows
- Baggage facilities: Available
- Other facilities: Below the seats

Technical
- Rolling stock: LHB coach
- Track gauge: 1,676 mm (5 ft 6 in)
- Operating speed: 55 km/h (34 mph) average including halts.

The 22613 / 22614 Shraddha Setu Superfast Express is an express train belonging to Southern Railway zone that runs between Rameswaram in Tamil Nadu and Ayodhya Cantt in Uttar Pradesh, India. It is currently being operated with 22613/22614 train numbers on a weekly basis. The train 22613 leaves from Rameswaram on Sundays and arrives at Ayodhya Cantt on Wednesday from where it starts return journey later in night as 22614. The train is operated and maintained by Southern Railway.

== Coach composition ==
The train has standard LHB rake rolling stock with a max speed of 130 kmph. As of January 2026, the train is running with following composition:

- 2 AC Two Tier
- 7 AC Three Tier
- 6 Sleeper Class
- 1 Pantry Car
- 4 General Unreserved
- 2 Luggage Cum Brake Vans.

== Route And Halts ==
The train runs with the numbers 22613/22614 and covers the 2920km journey in approximately 52 hours on both sides. Major Stations covered by this train are:

- Rameswaram
- Manamadurai Junction
- Thanjavur Junction
- Mayiladuthurai Junction
- Chennai Egmore
- Vijaywada Junction
- Balharshah
- Nagpur Junction
- Itarsi Junction
- Jabalpur
- Satna Junction
- Prayagraj Junction
- Jaunpur Junction
- Shahganj Junction
- Ayodhya Dham Junction
- Ayodhya Cantt
