= Cheranmahadevi railway station =

Railway station in Tamil Nadu, India

Cheranmahadevi
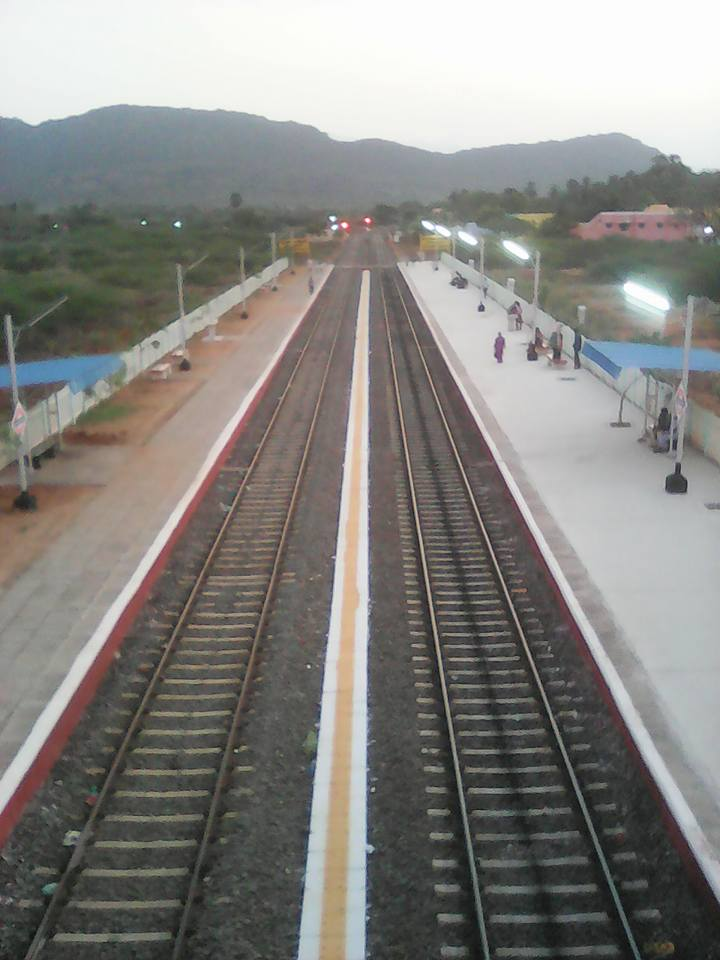
- Cheranmahadevi railway station

General information
- Location: Tirunelveli district, Tamil Nadu; India
- Coordinates: 8°40′46″N 77°33′43″E
- Elevation: 65 metres (213 ft)
- System: Indian Railways station
- Owner: Southern Railway zone of the Indian Railways
- Platforms: 2
- Tracks: 2
- Connections: Auto rickshaw stand, taxi stand

Construction
- Structure type: Standard (on ground station)

Other information
- Status: Functioning
- Station code: SMD
- Zone(s): Southern Railway
- Division(s): Madurai

Passengers
- 2022–23: 544 per day 198,622 per year
Location
- Location within India Location within Tamil Nadu

Cheranmahadevi railway station (station code:SMD) is an NSG–6 category Indian railway station in Madurai railway division of Southern Railway zone. It serves Cheranmahadevi, located in Tirunelveli district of the Indian state of Tamil Nadu.

== Performance and earnings ==
For the FY 2022–23, the annual earnings of the station was ₹3,323,211 (US$35,000) and daily earnings was ₹9,105 (US$95). For the same financial year, the annual passenger count was 198,622 and daily count was 544. While, the footfall per day was recorded as 859.
