= Pudukkottai railway station =

Railway station in Tamil Nadu, India

Pudukkottai
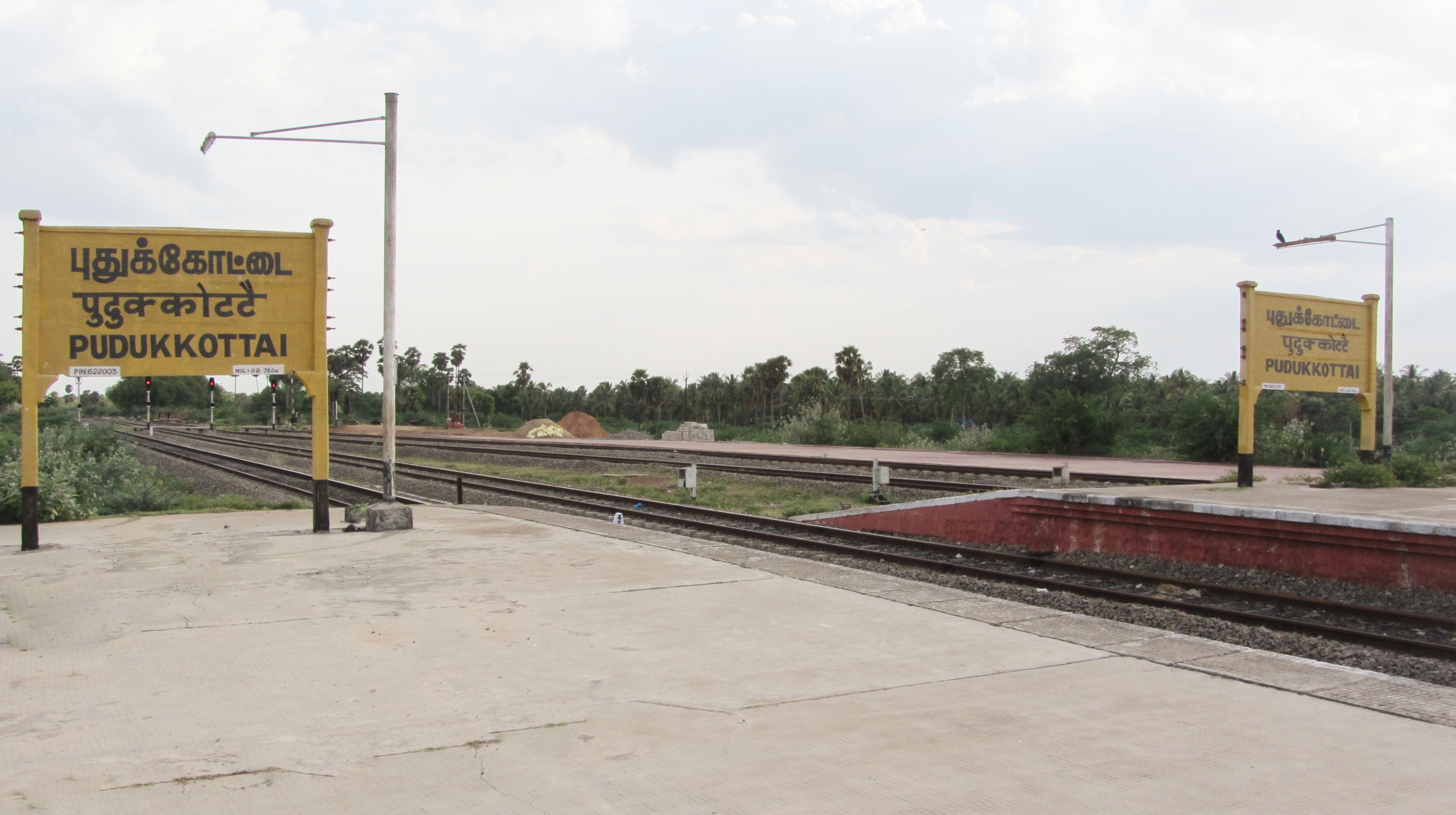
- Railway station

General information
- Location: Nainar Colony, Pudukkottai- 622 003, Tamil Nadu; India
- Coordinates: 10.372°N 78.802°E
- Elevation: 90 metres (300 ft)
- System: Indian Railways station
- Owner: Indian Railways
- Operator: Southern Railway zone
- Line: Tiruchirappalli–Manamadurai
- Platforms: 3
- Tracks: 4
- Connections: Auto rickshaw, Cab, Bus

Construction
- Structure type: At-grade
- Parking: Yes
- Cycle facilities: Yes

Other information
- Status: Functioning
- Station code: PDKT
- Zone(s): Southern Railway zone
- Division(s): Madurai
- Fare zone: Indian Railways

History
- Opened: 17 April 1929; 97 years ago
- Rebuilt: 2007; 19 years ago

Passengers
- 2022–23: 312,606 (per year); 856 (per day)

Services
Preceding station	Indian Railways	Following station
Vellanur towards	Southern Railway zone Tiruchirappalli–Karaikkudi line	Namanasamudram towards
Route map
Location
- Location within Tamil Nadu Location within India
- Interactive map

Pudukkottai railway station (station code: PDKT) is an NSG–5 category Indian railway station in Madurai railway division of Southern Railway zone. It serves Pudukkottai, located in Pudukkottai district of the Indian state of Tamil Nadu. It is an important passing station present on the Tiruchirappalli-Karaikkudi railway line.

== History ==
As early as 1886, a plan to link Pudukkottai by rail with Trichy and other places was mooted. But as the princely state of Pudukkottai was ruled by a king while most other parts of South India were under the British, protracted negotiations between these two authorities took place, specially with regard to the cost-bearing of the proposed railway line. Later, in 1921, a traffic-survey of the proposed Tiruchirapalli- Pudukkottai- Karaikudi- line was prepared by Rao Sahib S. Krishnamachari of South Indian Railways (SIR). It was estimated that the cost of construction of the railway line would work out to Rs 1.32 lakhs per mile. After a brief period of construction, the Trichy- Pudukkottai line was inaugurated on 17 April 1929 and Pudukkottai- Sivaganga line on 1 July 1930. Beyond Sivaganga, a railway line to Manamadurai existed already from 1909, and by this construction, a direct connectivity was established from Trichinopoly to Manamadurai.

== Location and layout ==
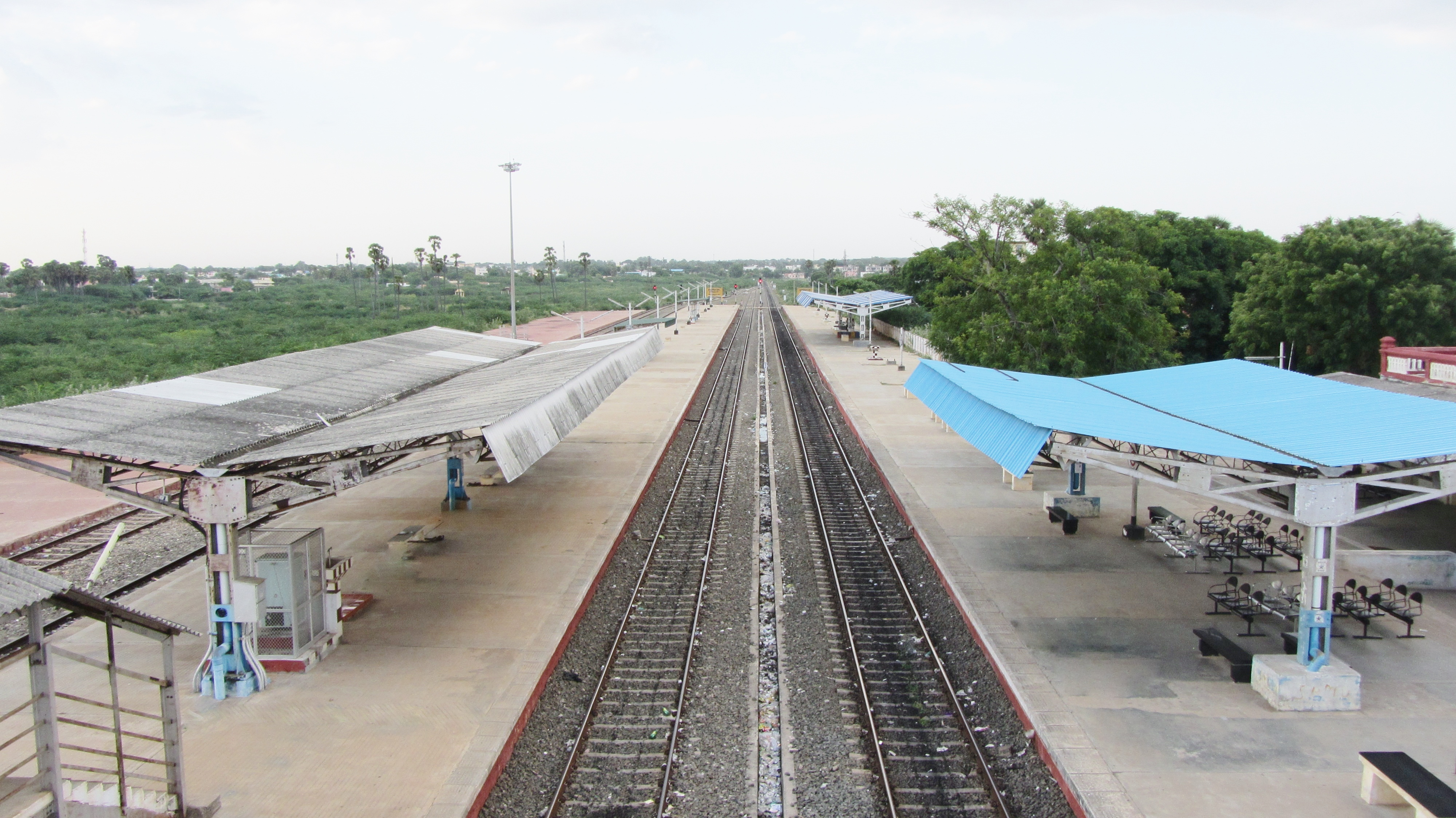
Pudukkottai railway station as seen from foot overbridge

The railway station is located about 2.1 kilometres (1.3 mi) from the new bus stand. It is not easily accessible as it is located far away from the main town. It can be accessed through a cab or an auto and also through government bus. Two wheeler and Four wheeler parking facilities are available here. Before the gauge conversion, the station had only 3 tracks. Now an additional fourth track has been constructed for handling goods trains. As it is a passing station, there are no pit lines available. There is also a considerable amount of space available for the extension of the railway station in future.

== Projects and development ==
It is one of the 73 stations in Tamil Nadu to be named for upgradation under Amrit Bharat Station Scheme of Indian Railways.

== Performance and earnings ==
For the FY 2022–23, the annual earnings of the station was ₹44,890,001 (US$470,000) and daily earnings was ₹122,986 (US$1,300). For the same financial year, the annual passenger count was 312,606 and daily count was 856. While, the footfall per day was recorded as 1,564.
