= Sivaganga railway station =

Railway station in Tamil Nadu, India

Sivaganga
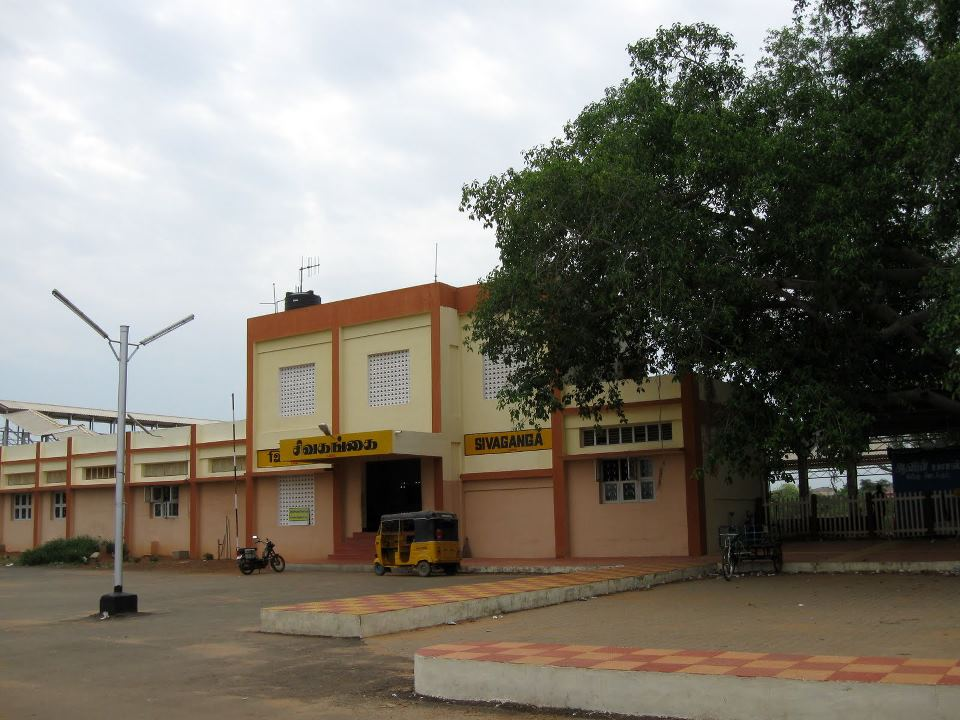

General information
- Location: Sentamil Nagar, Railway Station Road, Sivaganga, Sivaganga district, Tamil Nadu; India
- Coordinates: 9.8556382°N 78.5009328°E
- Elevation: 103.5 metres (340 ft)
- System: Express train, Passenger train and Commuter rail station
- Owner: Indian Railways
- Operator: Southern Railway zone
- Line: Manamadurai–Karaikudi line
- Platforms: 3
- Tracks: 3
- Connections: Auto rickshaw stand, Taxi stand

Construction
- Structure type: Standard (on-ground station)
- Parking: Yes

Other information
- Status: Functioning
- Station code: SVGA
- Zone(s): Southern Railway zone
- Division(s): Madurai

History
- Opened: 1 July 1930
- Rebuilt: 2008

Passengers
- 2022–23: 349,352 (per year); 957 (per day)

Services
| Preceding station | Indian Railways | Following station |
|---|---|---|
| Melakonakulam towards | Southern Railway zone Manamadurai–Karaikudi line | Panagudi towards |
Route map
Location
- Location within Tamil Nadu Location within India

Sivaganga railway station (station code: SVGA) is an NSG–5 category Indian railway station in Madurai railway division of Southern Railway zone. It serves Sivaganga, located in Sivaganga district of the Indian state of Tamil Nadu.

== History ==
History of this station goes back to British Rule. This station served as a Terminal Railway Station of Manamadurai - Sivagangai Branch Line. Later new railway line was built between Trichinopoly (now Tiruchirappalli) to Pudukkottai for goods transport. In order to establish a direct rail link in-between Sivagangai to Tiruchirappalli railway line was established via Karaikudi. Later Aranthangi Tiruvarur line was extended until Karaikudi from Aranthangi in order ease movement of goods to Nagapattinam Port. So it made Karaikudi as a Junction. Sivagangai is the oldest stations in Tiruchirappalli Manamadurai Section.

== Location and layout ==
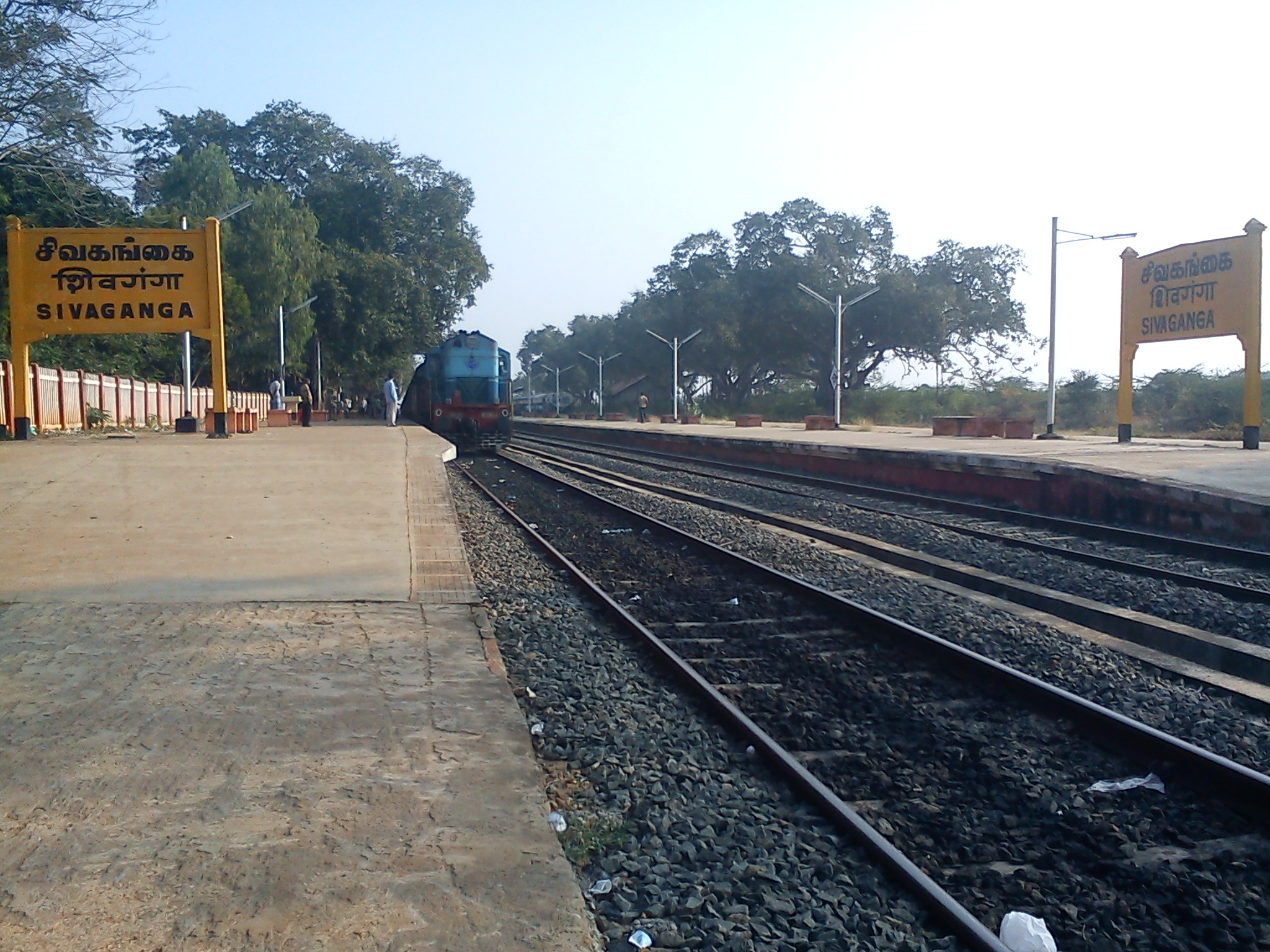
Rameshwarem Express at Sivaganga railway station

The Sivaganga railway station is located at the outskirt of Sivagangai town. The train station falls on the Manamadurai–Karaikudi broad-gauge line.

== Performance and earnings ==
For the FY 2022–23, the annual earnings of the station was ₹38,610,816 (US$400,000) and daily earnings was ₹105,783 (US$1,100). For the same financial year, the annual passenger count was 349,352 and daily count was 957. While, the footfall per day was recorded as 1,839.

== See also ==
- Sethu Express
- Boat Mail
- Silambu Express
- Manamadurai Junction
- Karaikkudi Junction
