= Aranthangi railway station =

Railway station in Tamil Nadu, India

Aranthangi
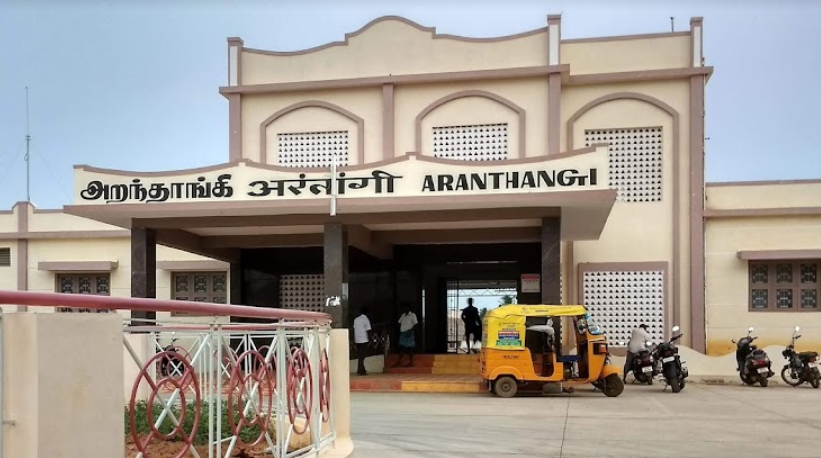
- Main Entrance of the Station - ATQ

General information
- Location: Aranthangi–Kattumavadi Rd, Aranthangi, Pudukkottai district, Tamil Nadu; India
- Coordinates: 10.2025°N 78.9797°E
- Elevation: 95 m (312 ft)
- System: Passenger train station
- Owner: Indian Railways
- Operator: Southern Railway zone
- Line: Chennai Egmore–Rameswaram line
- Platforms: 3 platforms
- Tracks: Broad gauge
- Connections: Bus stand, taxicab stand, auto rickshaw stand

Construction
- Structure type: Standard (on-ground station)
- Parking: Yes, opened
- Accessible: Disabled access

Other information
- Status: Active
- Station code: ATQ
- Zone(s): Southern Railway zone
- Division(s): Tiruchirappalli

History
- Opened: 1903; 123 years ago
- Rebuilt: 2019; 7 years ago
Route map
Location
- Location within India Location within Tamil Nadu

Aranthangi railway station (station code: ATQ) is an NSG–6 category Indian railway station in Tiruchirappalli railway division of Southern Railway zone. It is a railway station serving the town of Aranthangi in Tamil Nadu, India. This station was first opened on 31.12.1903 along with Pattukottai to Aranthangi section before independence. This station located in the thiruvarur -karaikudi section one of the longest stretch in the division.

== Location ==
The railway station is located off the Aranthangi–Kattumavadi Rd of Mayiladthurai. The nearest bus depot is located in Aranthangi while the nearest airport is situated 76 kilometres (47 mi) away in Tiruchirappalli.

== Trains ==
After reopening only 4 trains Runs on this station. people of Aranthangi and TVR-KKDI section demand to operate more daily trains in these route. current running trains are

- 06197/06198 TVR-KKDI-TVR EXPRESS (WEEKLY SIX DAYS)
- 20683/20684 Tambaram-Sengottai Super fast express(TRIWEEKLY)
- 07695/07696 SC-RMM EXPRESS (WEEKLY)
- 06035/06036 ERS-VLNK EXPRESS (WEEKLY)
