= Ramanathapuram railway station =

Railway station in Tamil Nadu, India

Ramanathapuram Ramanad
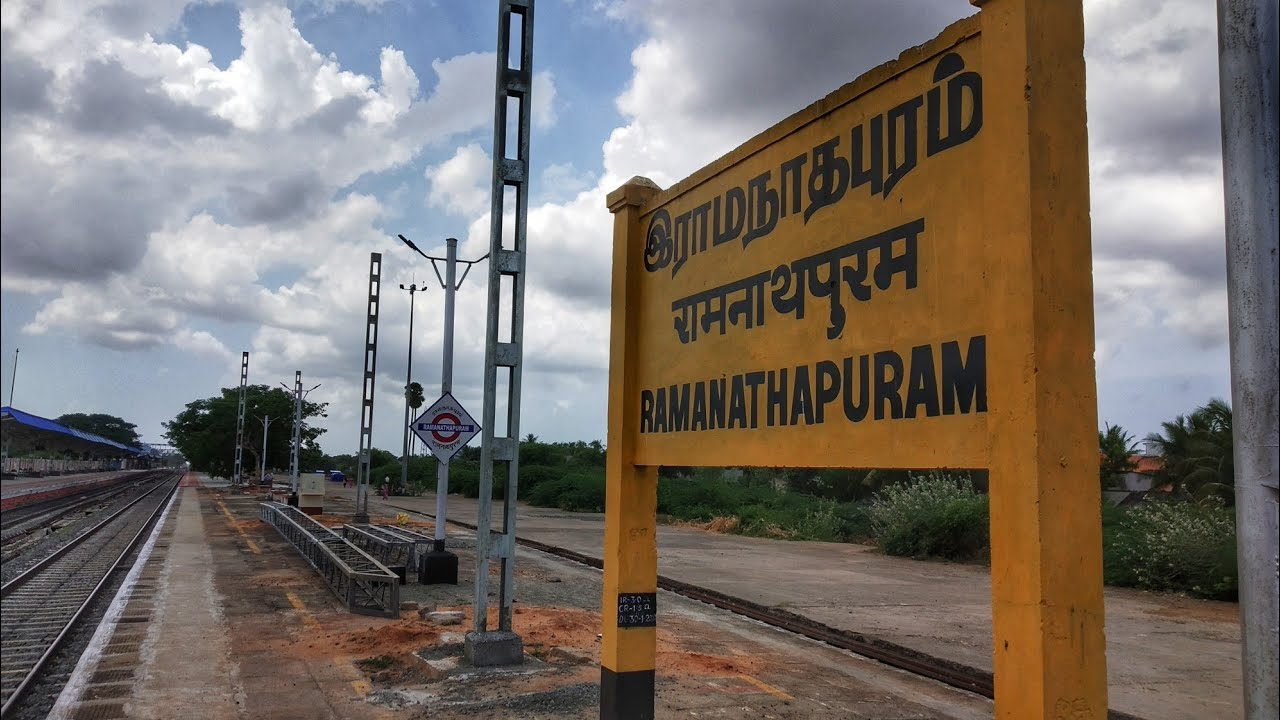

General information
- Location: Railway Feeder Rd, MSK Nagar, Pasumpon Nagar, Ramanathapuram, Ramanathapuram district, Tamil Nadu, Pincode-623501. India
- Coordinates: 9.35907653104723°N 78.83697149357684°E
- Elevation: 2 metres (6 ft 7 in)
- System: Indian Railways station
- Owner: Indian Railways
- Operator: Southern Railway zone
- Line: Manamadurai–Rameswaram line
- Platforms: 3
- Tracks: 3
- Connections: Bus stand, taxicab stand, auto rickshaw stand

Construction
- Structure type: Standard (on-ground station)
- Parking: Yes

Other information
- Status: Functioning
- Station code: RMD
- Zone(s): Southern Railway
- Division(s): Madurai

History
- Opened: 1902; 124 years ago
- Rebuilt: 2007;12 years ago

Passengers
- 2022–23: 734,635 (per year); 2,013 (per day)

Services
Preceding station	Indian Railways	Following station
Valantaravai towards	Southern Railway zone Manamadurai–Rameswaram branch line	Sattrakudi towards
Route map
Location
- Location within Tamil Nadu Location within India

Ramanathapuram railway station (station code: RMD) is an NSG–3 category Indian railway station in Madurai railway division of Southern Railway zone. It serves the town of Ramanathapuram, located in Ramanathapuram district of the Indian state of Tamil Nadu. It is the junction point for Virudhunagar and Tirunelveli rail routes.

== Location and layout ==
The railway station is located off the Railway Feeder Rd, MSK Nagar, Pasumpon Nagar of Ramanathapuram. The nearest bus depot is located in Ramanathapuram while the nearest airport is situated 120 kilometres (75 mi) away in Madurai.

== Lines ==
The station is a focal point of the historic main line that connects Chennai with places like Varanasi Junction, Bhubaneswar, Madurai, Manamadurai, Mayiladuthurai, Thanjavur Junction, Karaikudi Junction, Tiruchirappalli, Coimbatore, Rameswaram, etc.

- BG single line towards Manamadurai Junction to Rameswaram.

== New Lines in proposal ==
Karaikudi-Devakottai-Ramanathapuram-Tuticorin new BG line: Reconnaissance Engineering cum Traffic Survey for a new BG line between Karaikkudi and Tuticorin via Devakkottai and Ramanathapuram (214.81 km) was conducted and Survey Report was sent to Railway Board on 30.08.2011. This project was shelved by Railway Board.

== Projects and development ==
It is one of the 73 stations in Tamil Nadu to be named for upgradation under Amrit Bharat Station Scheme of Indian Railways.

== Performance and earnings ==
For the FY 2022–23, the annual earnings of the station was ₹157,328,677 (US$1.6 million) and daily earnings was ₹431,037 (US$4,500). For the same financial year, the annual passenger count was 734,635 and daily count was 2,013. While, the footfall per day was recorded as 4,151.
