= Madurai railway division =

Railway division of India

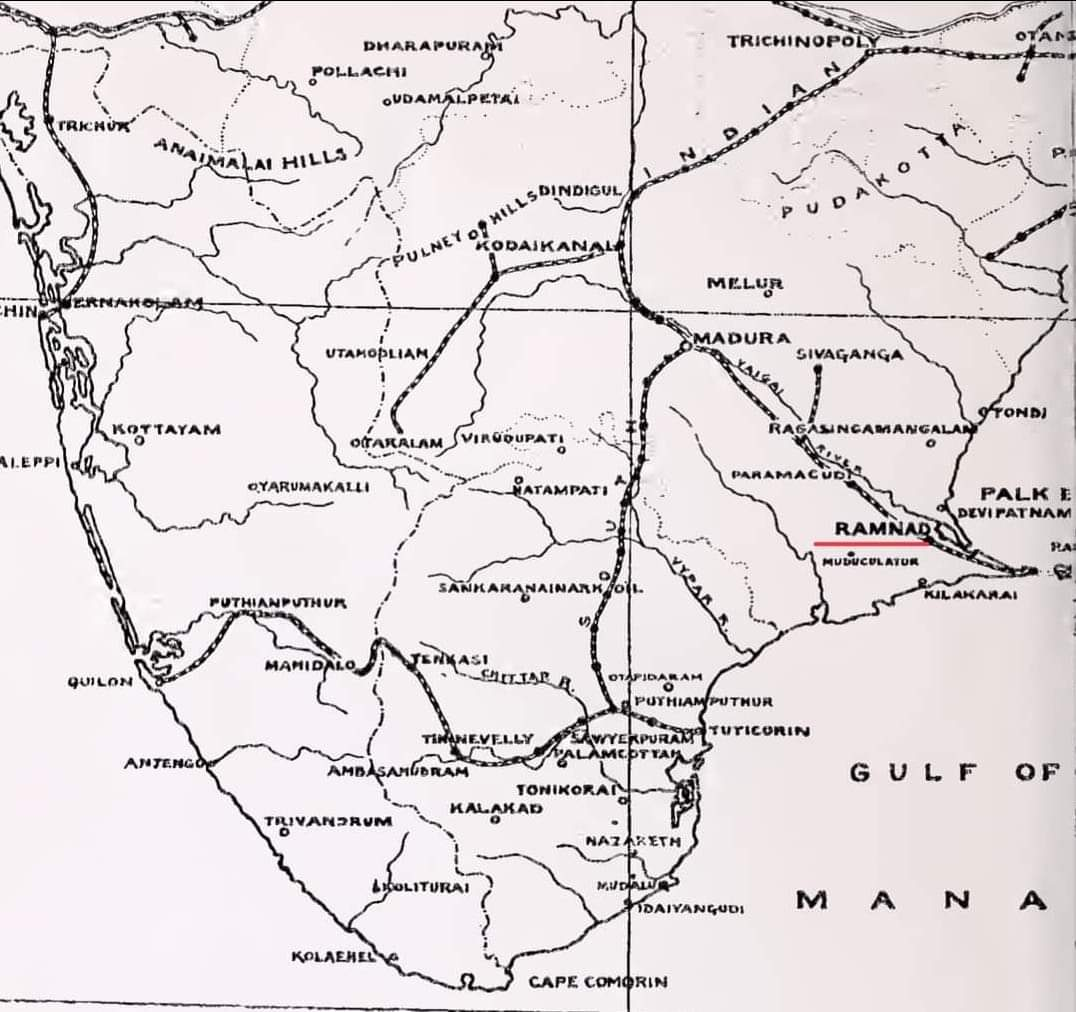
- Schematic Route Map of Madurai railway division, from the South Indian Railway Imperial Gazette of India, 1909

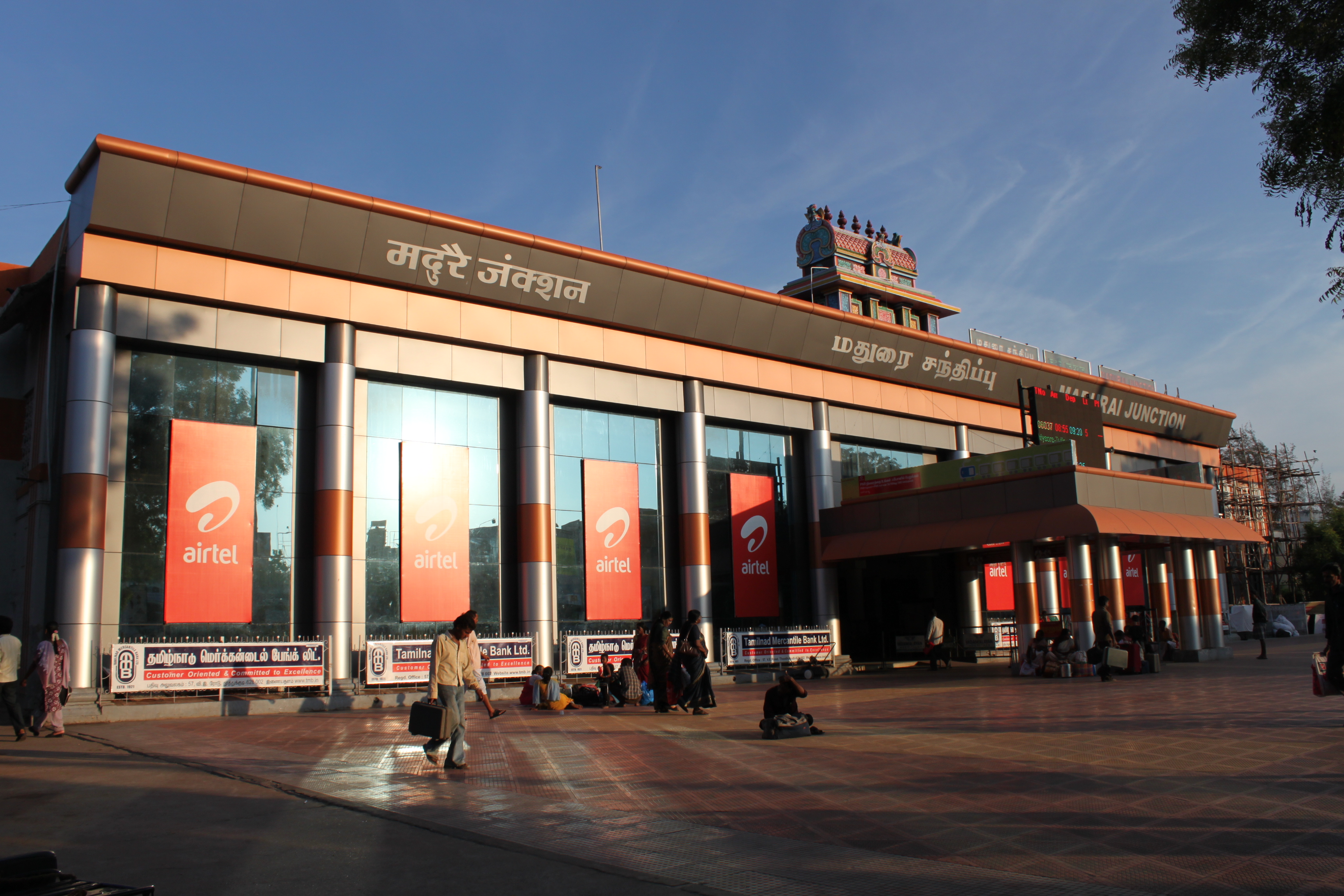
- Front view of Madurai Junction

Overview
- Headquarters: Madurai
- Locale: Tamil Nadu, India
- Dates of operation: 1956; 70 years ago–
- Predecessor: Southern Railways

Technical
- Track gauge: 1,676 mm (5 ft 6 in)
- Previous gauge: 1,000 mm (3 ft 3 3/8 in)
- Length: 1,356 km (843 mi)

Other
- Website: Madurai railway division

Madurai railway division is one of the six railway divisions under the jurisdiction of Southern Railway zone of the Indian Railways. Officially created in 1956, it spans over 1,356 km (843 mi) making it the largest railway division of the Southern Railways. Prior to the formation of the Thiruvananthapuram railway division which was carved out of the division, it was one of the largest railway divisions in the country. Currently it covers up to twelve districts of Tamil Nadu and one in Kerala. It is headquartered in Madurai.

Major revenue generating junctions in the division are Madurai, Tirunelveli, Dindigul,Tenkasi In these stations most of the train halt and rake reversals takes place and also passenger foot fall is high.

== History ==
=== Origins ===
The first railway line in this region was open in 1857 connecting Madurai to Trichnopoly (Trichy) via Dindigul and onward. In the following year, the railway line from Madurai to the port city of Thoothukudi was completed. In the same year, another line branching off from Vanchi Maniyachchi to Tirunelveli was opened.

Most of the other current lines were completed in the twentieth century. Among them were:

Line	Year
Madurai–Mandapam line	1902
Tirunelveli–Kallidaikurichi line	1902
Manamadura–Sivaganga line	1902
Kallidaikurichi–Sengottai line	1903
Kollam–Punalur line	1904
Punalur–Sengottai line	1904
Pamban–Rameswaram line	1906
Pamban–Dhanushkodi line	1908
Mandapam–Pamban line	1914
Tirunelveli–Thiruchendur line	1923
Virudhunagar–Tenkasi line	1927
Dindigul–Pollachi line	1928
Thiruchirappalli–Pudukkottai line	1929
Pudukkottai–Sivaganga line	1930
Virudhunagar–Aruppukkottai Line	1963
Aruppukkottai–Manamadurai Line	1964

=== Inception ===
The Government decided to locate the headquarters of the division, which includes Tinnevely also, at Madurai. The Madurai railway division was formed in 1956, comprising the Ernakulam-Thiruvananthapuram line, Thiruvananthapuram-Nagercoil-Tirunelveli-Madurai line, Kollam-Sengottai-Tirunelveli line, Rameswaram-Manamadurai-Madurai line, Manamadurai-Karaikudi-Tiruchirappalli line, Madurai-Dindigul-Pollachi line, Karaikudi-Thiruduraipoondi-Thiruvarur line and the Madurai-Bodinayakkanur line. All lines currently in use have been converted to broad gauge (BG).

In 1979, certain sections of the railway division were carved out to form the Thiruvananthapuram railway division. The metre gauge sections of Madurai division were retained, while all the newly laid broad gauge sections of Madurai Division were transferred to Trivandrum Division. Thus, the Thiruvananthapuram-Nagercoil-Kanyakumari BG line, and the under-construction Tirunelveli-Nagercoil BG line were transferred to Trivandrum Division, bringing down the jurisdiction of the division to 1356 km. It was then mentioned that when the Tirunelveli-Madurai line is converted into BG line the sections falling under Kanyakumari district and Tirunelveli district would be transferred back to Madurai Division. The Tirunelveli-Madurai line was converted into BG line on 8-4-1981.

== Administration and jurisdiction ==
Th division spans across two states namely Tamil Nadu and Kerala. In Tamil Nadu it serves twelve districts: Coimbatore, Dindigul, Madurai, Pudukottai, Ramanathapuram, Sivagangai, Theni, Tiruppur, Thoothukudi, Tirunelveli, Tenkasi and Virudhunagar districts. In Kerala, the division covers the district of Kollam as far as Kilikollur railway station.

=== Categorisation of stations ===
The list includes the stations under the Madurai railway division and their station category.

Category	No.	Stations
NSG-1	0	—
NSG-2	2	Madurai Junction, Tirunelveli Junction
NSG-3	5	Tuticorin, Tiruchendur,Rameswaram, Dindigul Junction , Tenkasi Junction
NSG-4	6	Virudhunagar Junction, Karaikudi Junction, Kovilpatti, Ramanathapuram, etc.
NSG-5	21	Manamadurai Junction, Sattur, Rajapalayam, Pudukkottai, Sivakasi, Sivaganga, Aruppukkottai, etc.
NSG-6	81	all others
HG-1	0	—
HG-2	11	—
HG-3	10	—
Total	135	—

Stations closed for passengers: Nataransankottai, Karupatti, Nedugulam, Manamadurai East, Kulathur, Thondaimanallur, and some others.

List of stations and its MSG categories in Madurai division for 2023

== Performance and earnings ==
The division won the inter-divisional overall efficiency - Best Division - award for its performance and earnings in the financial year of 2013. The total originating earnings for the year 2013-14 is Rs 576.29 crore as against the 2012-13 actual of Rs 523.68 crore leading to a 10% growth in overall earnings. On the punctuality front, the division achieved 96.2% for express and mail trains and 96.8% for passenger trains against the target of 96 per cent. Cash awards and merit certificates were distributed to officers and stations for their performance and maintenance. Railway school students performed cultural events during the celebrations.

== Operations and services ==
=== Regular trains ===
No of trains run	Daily	Non-daily
Express	25	34
Passenger	56	0

=== Special trains ===
2011-12	2012-13	2013-14 (Up to October)
1965	1848	700

=== Stations ===
Passenger halts	No. of stations
Block stations	101
Flag stations	20
Halt stations	16

== See also ==
- Tiruchirappalli railway division
- Thiruvananthapuram railway division
- Southern Railways
