= Chidambaram railway station =

Railway station in Tamil Nadu, India

Chidambaram
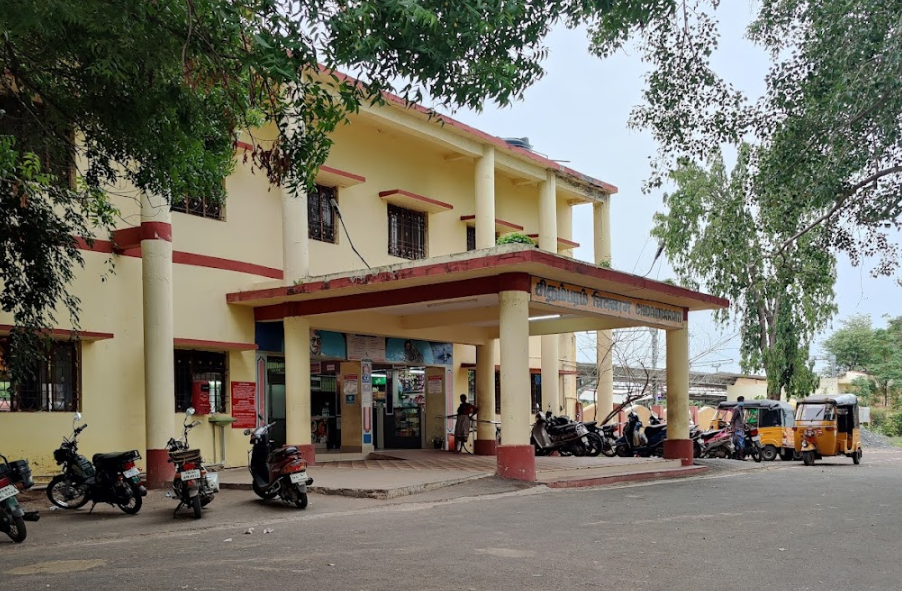
- Entrance of Chidambaram Railways Station

General information
- Location: Railway feeder Rd, Chidambaram, Cuddalore district, Tamil Nadu; India
- Coordinates: 11.3912°N 79.7034°E
- Elevation: 6 metres (20 ft)
- System: Indian Railways station
- Owner: Indian Railways
- Operator: Southern Railway zone
- Line: Chennai Egmore–Thanjavur main line
- Platforms: 3
- Tracks: 3
- Connections: Auto, Taxi Stand, Bus stand

Construction
- Structure type: Standard
- Parking: Available
- Accessible: Disabled access

Other information
- Status: Functioning
- Station code: CDM
- Zone(s): Southern Railway zone
- Division(s): Tiruchirappalli
- Fare zone: Indian Railways

History
- Electrified: 25 kV AC
Location
- Location within India Location within Tamil Nadu

Chidambaram railway station (station code: CDM) is an NSG–5 category Indian railway station in Tiruchirappalli railway division of Southern Railway zone. It is a railway station situated in Chidambaram, a municipal town and a taluk headquarters in Cuddalore district, Tamil Nadu, India. It is situated on the main line.

== Background ==
The railhead links the city trains to several cities such as Chennai, Tiruchirappalli, Nagercoil, Rameswaram, Madurai, Tirupati, Varanasi, Mumbai, Bhubaneswar and Mysuru. Special trains used to ply during Maha Kumbhabhishekam Festival at Chidambaram Temple ever since the past connecting with Tiruchirappalli Junction, Mayiladuthurai Junction, Viluppuram Junction, Chennai Egmore, Madurai Junction, Karaikkudi Junction, Thiruvarur Junction and Thanjavur Junction.

== Location and layout ==
The railway station is located off the Railway feeder Rd, Annamalai Nagar, Chidambaram. The nearest bus depot is located in Chidambaram while the nearest airport is situated 175 kilometres (109 mi) away in Tiruchirapalli.

== Lines ==
The station is a focal point of the historic main line that connects Chennai Egmore with places like Thanjavur Junction, Nagapattinam Junction, Karaikudi Junction, Thiruvarur Junction, Rameswaram..

== Projects and development ==
It is one of the 73 stations in Tamil Nadu to be named for upgradation under Amrit Bharat Station Scheme of Indian Railways.
