= 1964 Rameswaram cyclone =

Tropical cyclone in the Indian Ocean

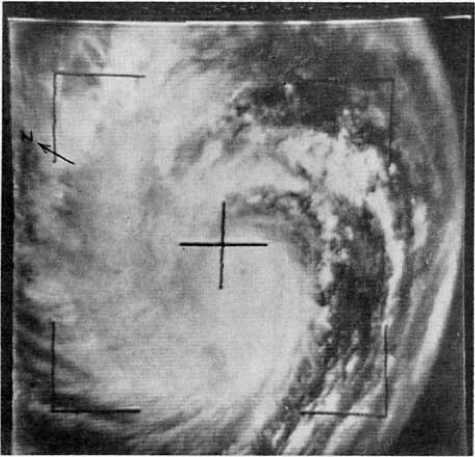
- Satellite image of the cyclone on 21 December

Meteorological history
- Formed: 18 December 1964
- Dissipated: 26 December 1964

Super cyclonic storm
- 3-minute sustained (IMD)
- Highest winds: 240 km/h (150 mph)
- Lowest pressure: ≤970 hPa (mbar); ≤28.64 inHg

Category 5-equivalent tropical cyclone
- 1-minute sustained (SSHWS/JTWC)
- Highest winds: 260 km/h (160 mph)

Overall effects
- Fatalities: ≤1,800
- Damage: $150 million (1964 USD)
- Areas affected: Ceylon, India
- Part of the 1964 North Indian Ocean cyclone season

The 1964 Rameswaram cyclone (also known as the Dhanushkodi cyclone) was regarded as one of the most powerful storms on record to ever strike India. The system was first identified as an area of low pressure over the Andaman Sea on 15 December. Following interaction with a tropical wave/Storm Surge, it began to develop and became a depression by 18 December. Increasingly rapid intensification ensued over the following days with the cyclone attaining hurricane-force winds around 5°N the next day. Early on 23 December, the storm struck Ceylon near Trincomalee with winds estimated at 240 km/h (150 mph), ranking it as a modern-day super cyclonic storm. Weakening somewhat, the storm soon struck Madras (current Tamil Nadu). Rapid weakening followed once the cyclone was onshore and it degenerated into a depression on 24 December as it emerged over the Arabian Sea. The system later dissipated on 26 December over open water.

== Meteorological history ==
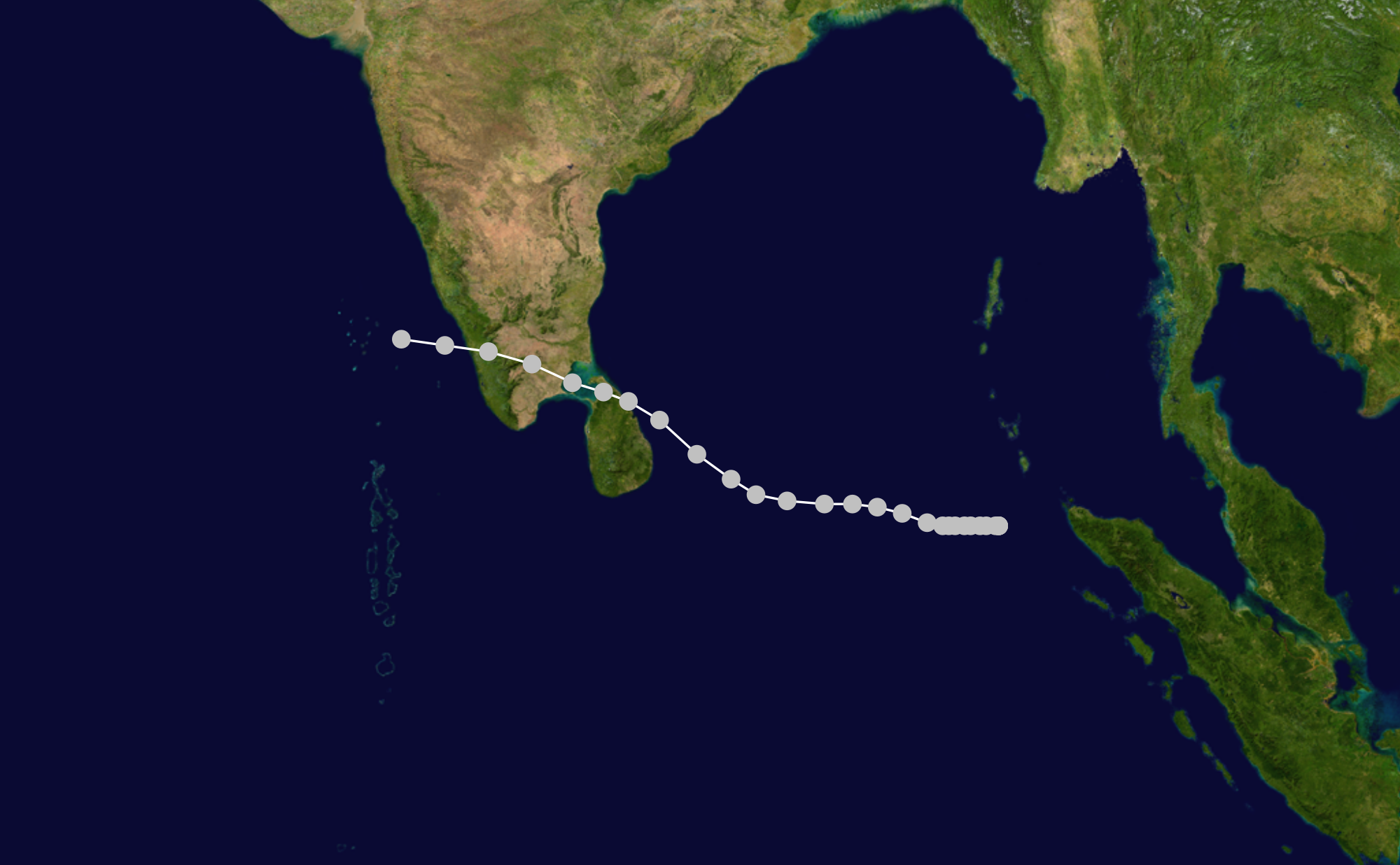
Map plotting the storm's track and intensity, according to the Saffir–Simpson scale Map key Saffir–Simpson scale Tropical depression (≤38 mph, ≤62 km/h) Tropical storm (39–73 mph, 63–118 km/h) Category 1 (74–95 mph, 119–153 km/h) Category 2 (96–110 mph, 154–177 km/h) Category 3 (111–129 mph, 178–208 km/h) Category 4 (130–156 mph, 209–251 km/h) Category 5 (≥157 mph, ≥252 km/h) Unknown Storm type Tropical cyclone Subtropical cyclone Extratropical cyclone, remnant low, tropical disturbance, or monsoon depression

On 15 December 1964, an area of low pressure was identified over the southern Andaman Sea. Remaining nearly stationary, a tropical wave soon interacted with the low and allowed the system to consolidate into a depression two days later. A large area of showers and thunderstorms covered much of the southern Bay of Bengal and Andaman Sea. On 18 December, a ship with the callsign JMAG reported 45 km/h (30 mph) winds and a barometric pressure of 1005.5 mbar (hPa; 29.69 inHg). Based on this report, the India Meteorological Department (IMD) classified the system as a deep depression. Over the following days, the system quickly intensified as it began moving slowly westward. By 19 December, it became a severe cyclonic storm and soon acquired hurricane-force winds early on 20 December while near 5°N. The cyclone became one of only a handful of systems to attain such an intensity close to the equator. Moving more west-northwesterly, the cyclone continued to deepen as it approached southern India. On 21 December, satellite imagery showed clouds from the storm covering an area roughly 965 km (600 mi) wide. Several prominent banding features were present, with one such feature, extending over 240 km (150 mi) crossing the equator while maintaining a cyclonic arc. Clouds associated with the cyclone extended as far as 485 km (301 mi) into the Southern Hemisphere.

Several vessels encountered the storm, with one reporting 110 km/h (70 mph) winds early on 22 December. That day winds along the coast of Ceylon increased; the storm accelerated during this time as well. Early on 23 December, the cyclone struck the northern tip of Ceylon and turned back toward the west-northwest. According to an officer on Pamban Island, located between Ceylon and Southern India, the storm's eye was no more than 16 km (9.9 mi) wide. Based on satellite imagery, it was estimated that the storm had peak winds of 240 km/h (150 mph), with gusts as high as 280 km/h (175 mph). This ranked the system as a modern-day super cyclonic storm. Additionally, the IMD estimated its central pressure to have been, at most, 970 mbar (hPa; 28.64 inHg). The lowest observed pressure was 978 mbar (978 hPa; 28.9 inHg) in Mannar on the west coast of Ceylon. Weakening somewhat, the storm soon struck Madras, south of Tondi. Once onshore, the cyclone rapidly weakened, becoming a depression before emerging over the Arabian Sea on 24 December. The system degenerated into a remnant low later that day and dissipated over open waters on 26 December.

== Impact ==
At least 1,800 people lost their lives as a result of the cyclone.

On 22 December, the powerful cyclone struck northern areas of Ceylon and caused catastrophic damage. According to survivors, a storm surge of 4.5 m (15 ft) swept across the area. Initial reports stated that 250 people lost their lives with thousands missing. About 5000 houses and 700 fishing boats were destroyed in the Jaffna district of Ceylon. The district's paddy crop was also destroyed. Other badly hit areas include Mannar and Trincomalee. The Trincomalee port suffered severe damage rendering it inoperable. The economic damage caused in Ceylon was estimated at Rs. 200 million. About 350 Ceylonese fishermen were missing at sea.

At least 1,000 people were killed on the island and many more were left unaccounted for. An unofficial estimate stated that the death toll would likely exceed 2,000. The government regarded it as, "the greatest tragedy to ever hit Ceylon."

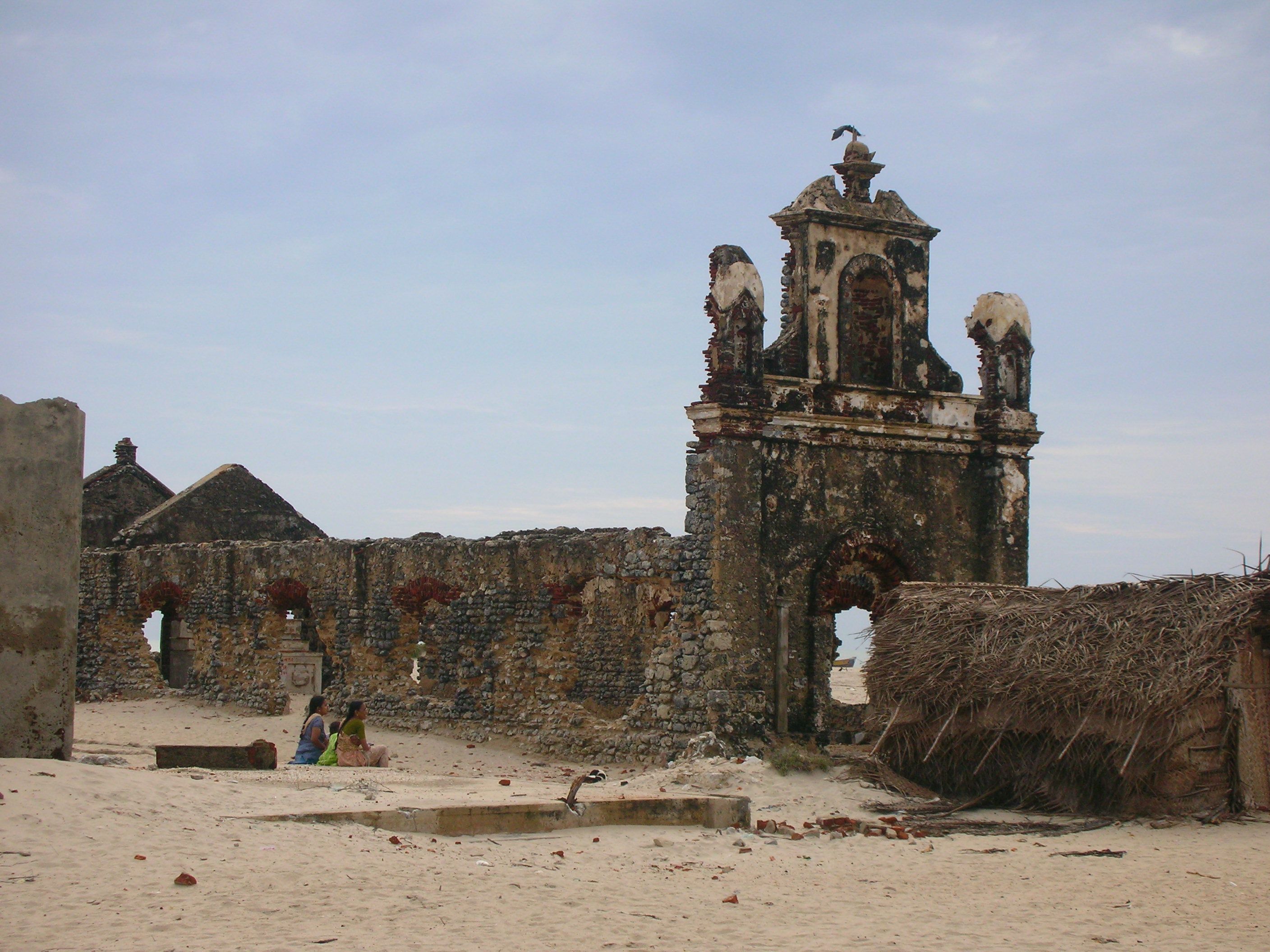
Remains of a church in Dhanushkodi in 2007

The effects of the cyclone were felt mostly on Pamban Island, which lies between the Indian mainland and Ceylon. More than 3000 people, many of them tourists and pilgrims, were stranded on the island. The total damage to property was estimated at $150 million.

On 23 December, an estimated 7.6 m (25 ft) storm surge struck the town of Dhanuskodi on the south-eastern edge of the island, submerging the town and overturning the train number 653 Pamban-Dhanuskodi passenger train which left Pamban Junction at 23:10 HRS and is almost completed its journey and is just around 1.5 kilometres ahead of Dhanushkodi railway station's approach, killing all 200 passengers onboard. The town, an important transit point between India and Ceylon, was completely destroyed and has not been rebuilt since. This has caused the permanent closure of both the Dhanushkodi railway station and the Pamban–Dhanushkodi railway line. Prior to the cyclone, the town had been an important commercial centre with a railway station, a customs office, post and telegraphs office, two medical institutions, one railway hospital, a panchayat union dispensary, a higher elementary school and port offices. A port had been functioning since 1 March 1914. At least 800 people were killed in Dhanushkodi alone.

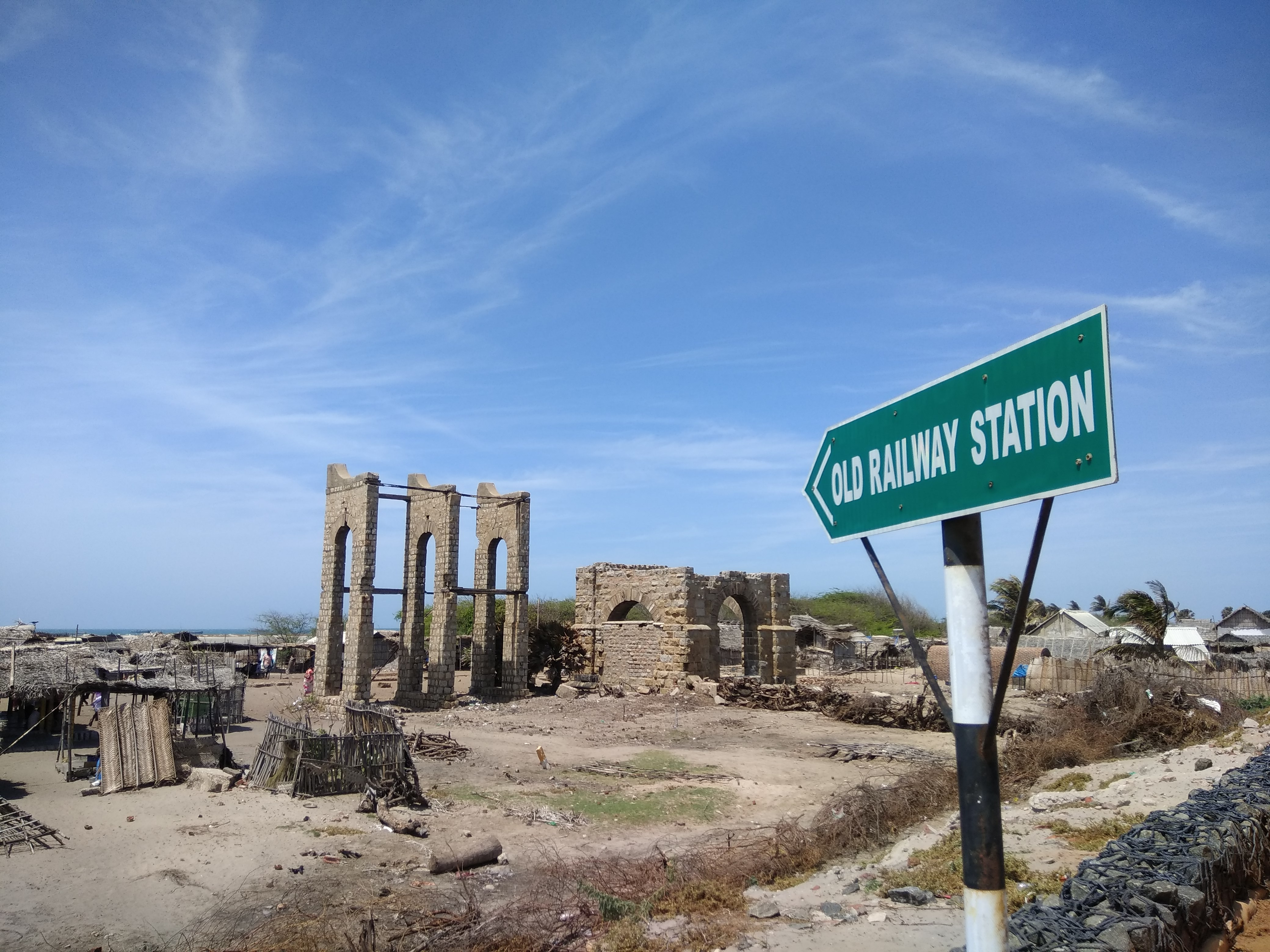
The ruins of Dhanushkodi Railway Station

Four radio operators remained in Dhanuskodi and risked their lives to continue broadcasting during the storm. Two railway employees patrolling the Pamban Bridge survived by clinging to the bridge frame for 12 hours. The Indian Government later honoured and rewarded them for their dedication.

== Aftermath ==
The scale of the disaster left villages isolated for at least three days and without food or clean water. Communication lines were severely damaged and hampered relief efforts. By 26 December, relief supplies were delivered to 14 villages by the Ceylonese Air Force. Britain, Cuba, West Germany, and the United States offered aid to Ceylon.

Reconstruction of the Pamban Bridge was deemed a priority and initially expected to take six months to complete. However, E. Sreedharan, an engineer tasked on the project, managed to have the railway bridge finished in 45 days. A stable road connection was built in the following years.

In Mandapam, the cyclone's surge created five tidal pools over a 2 km (1.2 mi) stretch of coastline. Three of the pools had higher than normal salinity coupled with below-average silicate content and were colonized by Peridinium. The other two featured opposite levels of salinity and silicate and were inhabited by Pyrocystis fusiformis. All five featured bioluminescence as a result. A study of these pools in 1965 showed a, "clear succession of organisms", with species of Penaeidae (Prawn), one species of amphipoda, one species of crab, and Acetes inhabiting the pools. Researchers also found a few Sepioteuthis and tintinnid. Lastly, 46 species of coastal fish were documented. Offshore, catastrophic damage occurred to coral reefs, with Echinopora lamellosa, Montipora foliosa, and alcyonarians being killed in large numbers. At Manacadu Point, near Mandapam, an elevated coral colony of Faviids and Porites was completely wiped out. In the eight years following the storm, colonies showed substantial growth across the Palk Strait, with Acropora corymbosa covering 25–30% of the reefs. Colonies of alcyonarians showed little sign of rejuvenation, however. Along the immediate coastline, the large-scale stirring of sand made areas unsuitable for coral and were not expected to ever regrow.
