= Manamadurai–Rameswaram branch line =

Railway line in India

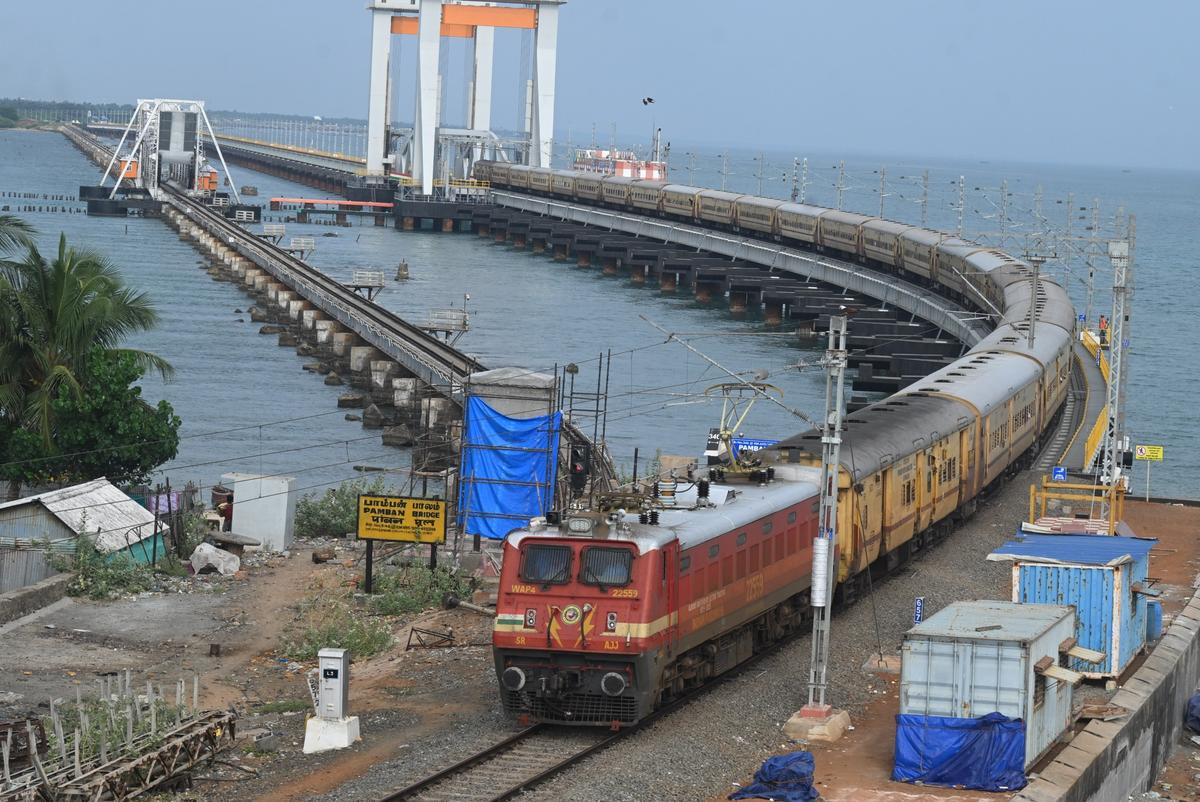
- First electric run from Rameswaram

Overview
- Status: Operating
- Owner: Indian Railways
- Termini: Manamadurai Junction; Rameswaram
- Website: www.sr.indianrailways.gov.in

Service
- Type: Express train Passenger train
- Operator(s): Southern Railway zone

Technical
- Line length: 161 km (100 mi)
- Number of tracks: 1
- Track gauge: 1,676 mm (5 ft 6 in)
- Old gauge: 1,000 mm (3 ft 3 3/8 in)
- Loading gauge: 4,725 mm × 3,660 mm (15 ft 6 in × 12 ft 0 in) (BG)
- Electrification: Completed
- Operating speed: 50 km/h (31 mph) 80 km/h (50 mph)

The Manamadurai–Rameswaram branch line is a branch railway line in the state of Tamil Nadu, India. The line starts at Manamadurai and ends at Rameswaram.

== History ==
The Madras Railway laid the metre gauge lines viz. Manamadurai–Mandapam line in 1902, Pamban–Rameswaram line in 1906, Pamban–Dhanushkodi line in 1908, and Mandapam–Pamban line in 1914.

During 1964 Rameshwaram Cyclone, the Pamban–Dhanushkodi section was completely damaged and was dismantled afterwards and was never rebuilt by Indian railways. This is because of the declarement of Dhanushkodi as "abandoned and unfit for habitation" by Madras (Chennai) government.

The Madurai–Manamadurai–Rameshwaram section was entirely converted to broad gauge in 2006.

== Future ==
There are plans to build a rail-cum-road bridge or tunnel from India to Sri Lanka. It would be built via Rameshwaram or Dhanushkodi.

Funds has been allocated for the reconstruction of Dhanushkodi Railway Line.
