= Manamadurai Junction railway station =

Railway station in Tamil Nadu, India

Coordinates: 9.682908258271999°N 78.45399981077674°E

Manamadurai Junction Indian Railways station
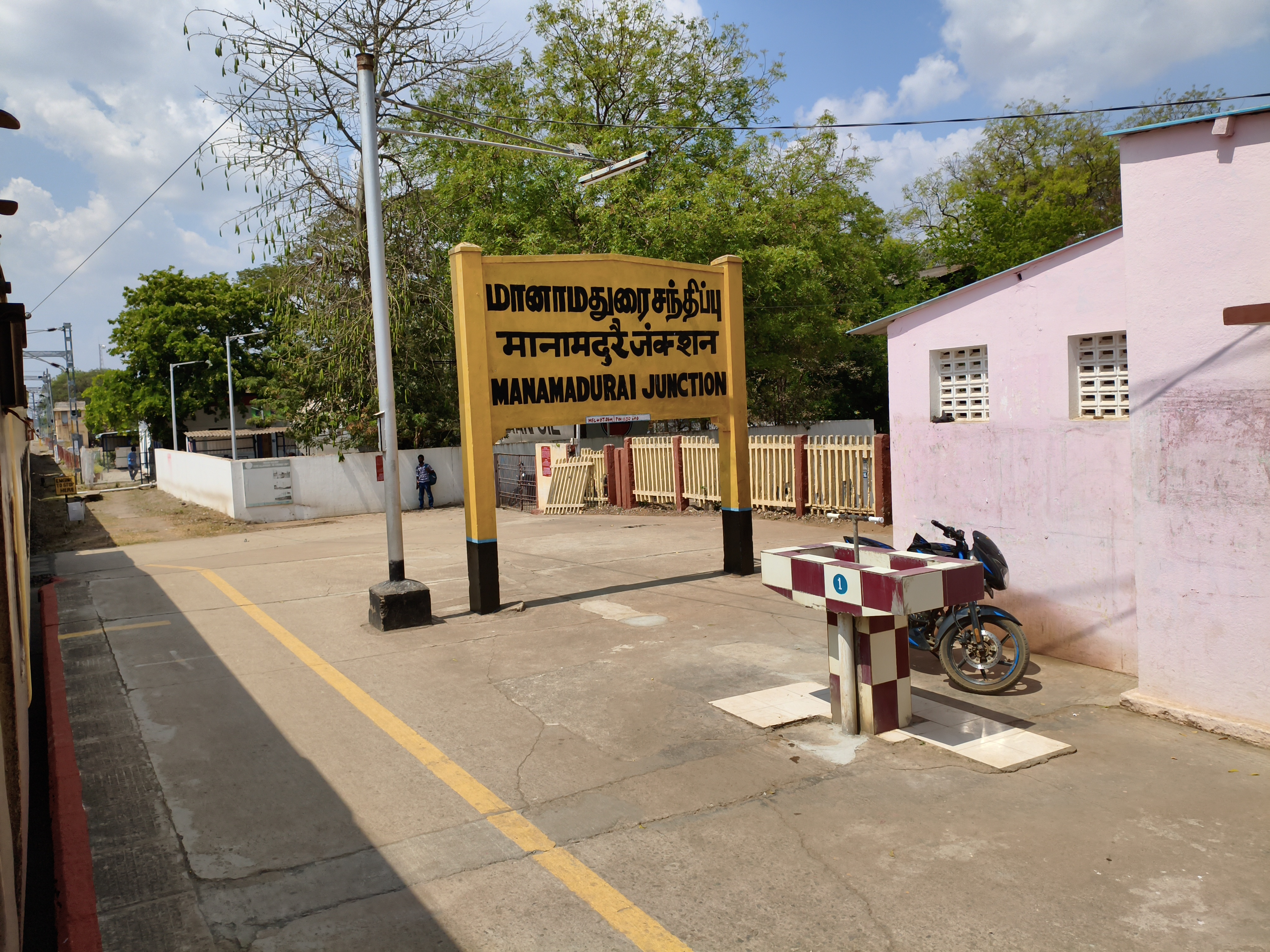
- Manamadurai Junction Station board(old)

General information
- Location: Railway Colony, Manamadurai west, Manamadurai, Sivagangai district, Tamil Nadu. India
- Elevation: 100 metres (330 ft)
- Owner: Indian Railways
- Operator: Southern Railways
- Lines: Manamadurai–Rameswaram branch line; Manamadurai–Virudhunagar line; Manamadurai–Madurai line; Manamadurai–Karaikudi line
- Platforms: 5
- Tracks: 6
- Train operators: Indian Railways
- Bus stands: Manamadurai Bus stand
- Connections: Bus stand, Taxicab stand, Auto rickshaw stand

Construction
- Structure type: At grade
- Parking: Car; Motorbike; Cycle; Autorickshaw
- Accessible: Yes
- Architectural style: Standard Indian

Other information
- Status: Functioning
- Station code: MNM
- Zone(s): Southern Railway zone
Division(s)
Madurai
Preceding station	Indian Railways	Following station
Melakonnakkulam towards	Southern Railway zone Tiruchirappalli–Virudhunagar line	Narikkudi towards
Preceding station	Indian Railways	Following station
Rajagambiram towards	Southern Railway zone Madurai–Rameswaram line	Sudiyur towards
- Fare zone: Madurai Subdivision

History
- Opened: 1902; 124 years ago
- Rebuilt: 2007; 19 years ago

Passengers
- 2022–23: 388,500 (per year); 1,064 (per day)

Services
- Passenger Trains
- Express Trains
- Superfast Express
- Freight(goods) Trains
Route map
Location
- Location within India Location within Tamil Nadu

Manamadurai Junction railway station (station code: MNM) is an NSG–5 category Indian railway junction station in Madurai railway division of Southern Railway zone. It serves the city of Manamadurai, located in Sivaganga district of the Indian state of Tamil Nadu. It is the one among the two major railway junctions in Sivaganga district and the other major one is Karaikudi Junction. Manamadurai junction is the only four branched junction in the district. It has totally 5 platforms, in which only 3 are functioning and last two are used for docking unscheduled and freight trains.

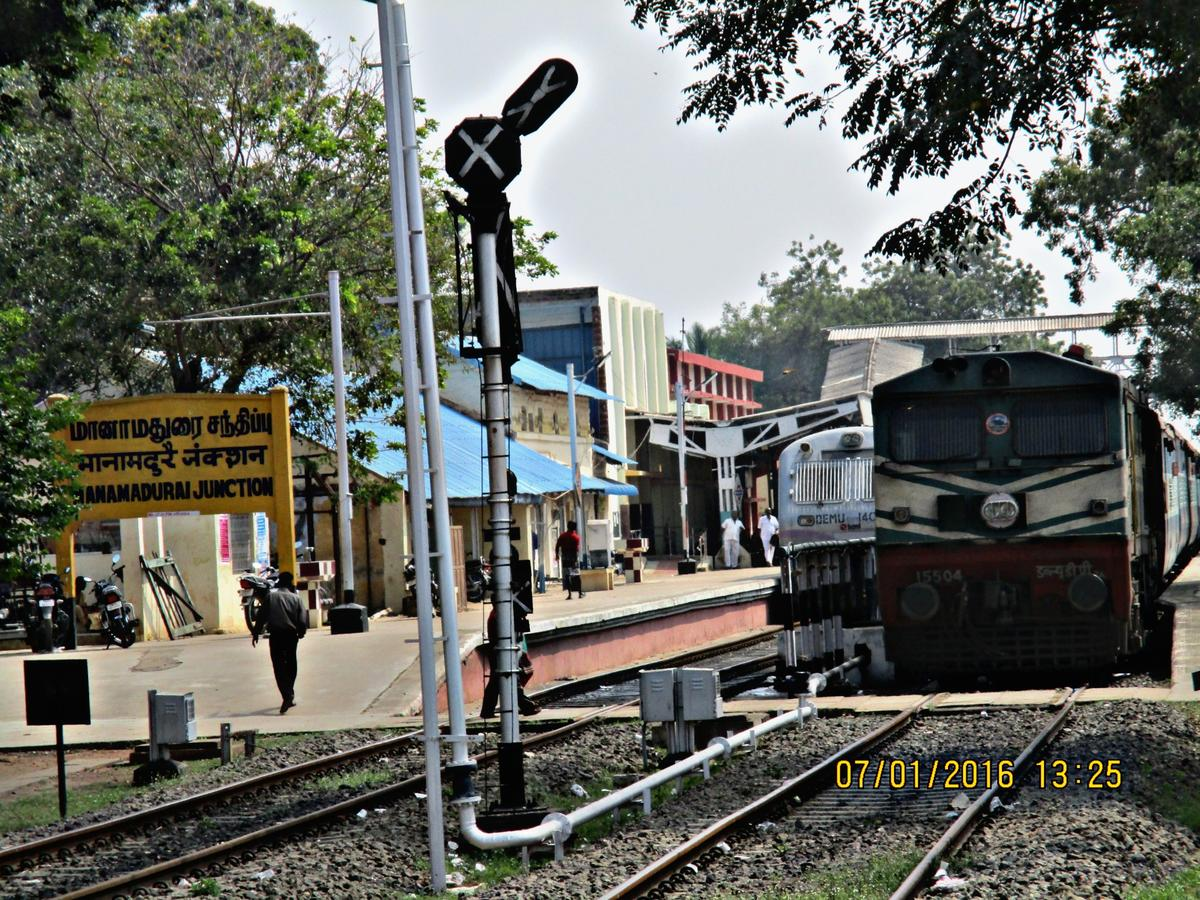
Manamadurai Junction halted with Madurai-Rameswaram Passenger and Virudhunagar-Karaikudi DEMU

== History ==
This station was constructed as a part of the Madurai Rameswaram Branch Railway line, built in Colonial India in 1902. This line was mainly constructed to connect the Indian province with Ceylon Province. Later, after the annexation of Sivagangai Estate, a 20 km branch line was constructed between Manamadurai and Sivaganga which converted this station into a railway junction and became the first junction in the Ramnad region. Pamban became a junction when a 17 km branch line was built between Pamban and Dhanushkodi; after the 1964 rameswaram cyclone, that branch line was closed. After India gained independence, a new railway line was constructed between Manamadurai and Virudhunagar under the rule of Kamaraj. This was the first railway line in Tamil Nadu to be built after Indian Independence.

== Location and layout ==
Manamadurai Junction is located close to its district headquarters, Sivagangai, which is 20 km away; it is 50 km away from its railway divisional headquarters Madurai. This railway junction has 6 railway tracks and 5 platforms, usually crowded in the morning and night. It has the second-largest curve.

The junction connects with some of the major Railheads like Tiruchirapalli, Virudhunagar, Karaikudi, Madurai and Rameswaram. Its facilities include a clean waiting hall, food, large parking space, Railway Protection Force (RPF) police station, and Railway Hospital facilities within the station complex premise. A retiring room, railway canteen, and adequate restrooms are also available at this junction. The nearby bus stand is well connected with the Cochin - Rameswaram Interstate Corridor National Highway (NH45), which is also an Asian Highway Network which is numbered AH43, which gives round-the-clock bus connectivity to various places nearby.

There is also a goods terminal that generates huge revenue for the entire Madurai railway division. Mostly the goods handled here are loading and sending charcoal to various parts of India. The nearby SIDCO and SIPCOT (industrial complex area by the government of Tamil Nadu) also contribute considerable profit to this junction. Goods unloaded here include some civil supplies for the Sivagangai district where it is located and various raw materials for those industries present near Sivagangai and Manamadurai regions.

== Lines and sections ==
The major lines of Manamadurai Junction are

- Madurai - Rameswaram Line
- Virudhunagar - Manamadurai line
- Manamadurai - Karaikudi line
- Sengottai - Chennai Egmore line (Via: Virudhunagar)
- Rameswaram - Chennai Egmore line (Via: Karaikudi, Chord line)
- Rameswaram - Chennai Egmore line (Via: Karaikudi, Tiruchirapalli, Tanjore, Mayiladuthurai, Chidambaram)
- Rameswaram- Chennai Egmore line (Via: Karaikud, Tiruvarur, Mayiladuthurai)
- Rameswaram - Tiruchirapalli line

== Performance and earnings ==
For the FY 2022–23, the annual earnings of the station was ₹60,227,382 (US$630,000) and daily earnings was ₹165,007 (US$1,700). For the same financial year, the annual passenger count was 388,500 and daily count was 1,064. While, the footfall per day was recorded as 2,067.

== Trains operated ==
It is a major stopping for The following trains:

=== Daily running ===
Some of the daily running trains include

- Madurai Rameswaram Passenger
- Virudhunagar - Karaikudi - Tiruchirapalli DEMU
- Tiruchirapalli - Rameswaram Express
- Rameswaram - Chennai Egmore (Sethu Superfast Express)
- Rameswaram - Chennai Egmore (Boat Mail Express)
- Rameswaram - Tambaram (Pamban Express)

=== Weekly/ Multi weekly trains ===
- Sengottai - Chennai Egmore (Silambu Superfast Express)
- Kanniyakumari - Rameswaram Express
- Puducherry - Kanniyakumari Express
- Rameswaram - Ayodhya Cantt. (Shraddha Setu Express)
- Rameswaram - okha Express
- Rameswaram - Ajmer Humsafar Express
- Rameswaram - Tirupati Express (Meenakshi Express)
- Rameswaram - Coimbatore Express
- Rameswaram - Bhubaneswar Express
- Rameswaram - SSS Hubali junction Express
- Velankanni - Ernakulam jn. Express
- Rameswaram - Firozpur Cantt. Humsafar Express
- Rameswaram - Banaras SF Express

== Special docking ==
All the long expresses and superfast expresses from other divisions of Indian Railways that run towards Rameswaram are docked in the non-functioning 4th and 5th platforms of Manamadurai junction for water filling and Rake maintenance. Trains like Ayodhya Rameswaram exp, Okha Rameswaram Exp, etc. make a technical dock at this station for water filling and rake maintenance. And also the station is home for 3 Track maintenance vehicles of Madurai Subdivision. Also the Madurai Junction–Bengaluru Cantonment Vande Bharat Express is docked here regularly due to insufficient place in Madurai Junction.
