= Rameswaram railway station =

Railway station in Tamil Nadu, India

Rameswaram RAMESWARAM
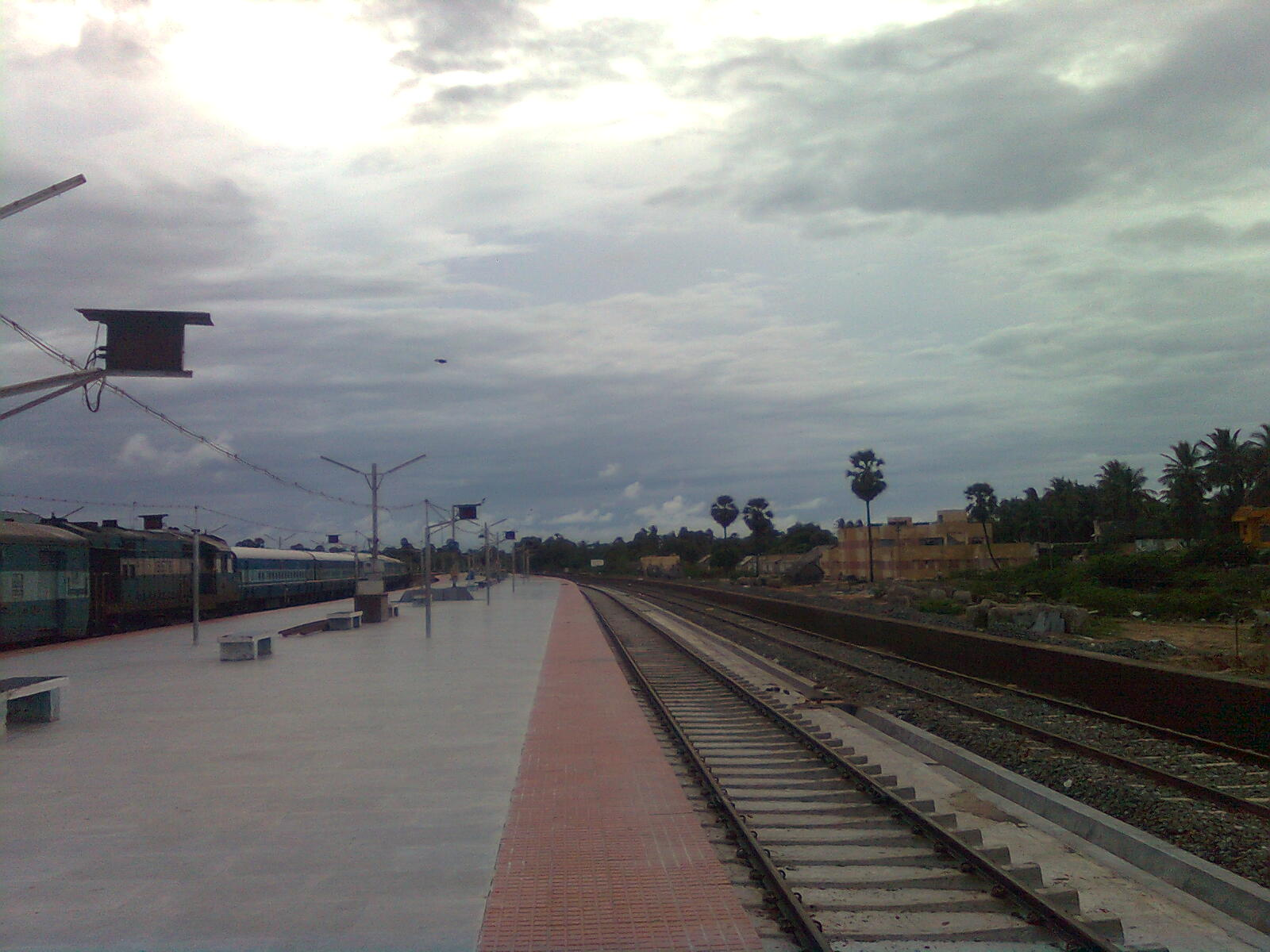
- Rameswaram Railway Station

General information
- Location: GP Road, Rameswaram, Ramanathapuram district, Tamil Nadu; India
- Coordinates: 9.282°N 79.309°E
- Elevation: 2 metres (6 ft 7 in)
- System
- Owner: Indian Railways
- Operator: Southern Railway
- Line: Manamadurai–Rameswaram branch line
- Platforms: 5
- Tracks: 12
- Connections: Bus stand, Auto rickshaw stand

Construction
- Structure type: Standard (on ground station)
- Parking: Yes
- Accessible: Disabled access

Other information
- Status: Temporarily Closed
- Station code: RMM
- Zone(s): Southern Railway zone
- Division(s): MDU

History
- Opened: 1906; 120 years ago
- Closed: 2022 December
- Rebuilt: 31 October 2007; 19 years ago
- Electrified: Completed
- Former names: Rameswaram Road

Passengers
- 2022–23: 1,088,427 (per year); 2,982 (per day) ▲100.5%
- Rank: 15

Services
Preceding station	Indian Railways	Following station
Terminus	Southern Railway zone Manamadurai–Rameswaram branch line	Pamban towards
Route map
Location
- Location within India Location within Tamil Nadu

Rameswaram railway terminus (station code: RMM) is an NSG–3 category Indian railway station in Madurai railway division of Southern Railway zone. It serves the town of Rameswaram, located in Ramanathapuram district of the Indian state of Tamil Nadu. The station links the pilgrim town as well as the rest of the island to the mainland via the highly acclaimed New Pamban Rail Bridge.

== Location and layout ==
The station is one of the oldest in the country, and accommodate trains such as the Sethu Express and the Boatmail Express, which were two of the most significant and historic trains operated in the region prior to the gauge conversion. There are four platforms, seven railway tracks, and two pitlines within the station. Currently, the Rameswaram railway station and the Pamban railway station are the only two functioning train stations in the island excluding the former rail terminus in Dhanushkodi that is no longer in use. The metre-gauge branch line from Pamban Junction to Dhanushkodi was dismantled after it was destroyed in a cyclone in 1964.

== New Railway route in proposal ==
Below New proposals were planned to have a faster travel for the pilgrims who were visiting the holy temple at Rameshwaram from various parts of the nation, the proposed route will benefit the faster connectivity between the state capital Chennai to Rameshwaram Temple via Tiruchirappalli, Karaikudi and Ramanathapuram railway stations, the new route would be faster from the existing route which would take more than 2 hours additional time for the current travel scenarios.

Karaikudi-Devakottai-Ramanathapuram new BG line:[6] Reconnaissance Engineering cum Traffic Survey for a new BG line between Karaikkudi and Ramanathapuram via Devakkottai (108 km) was conducted and Survey Report was sent to Railway Board on 30.08.2011. This project was shelved by Railway Board.

== Projects and development ==
It is one of the 73 stations in Tamil Nadu to be named for upgradation under Amrit Bharat Station Scheme of Indian Railways.

== Performance and earnings ==
For the FY 2022–23, the annual earnings of the station was ₹370,074,945 (US$4.0 million) and daily earnings was ₹1,013,904 (US$11,000). For the same financial year, the annual passenger count was 1,088,427 and daily count was 2,982. While, the footfall per day was recorded as 6,516.
