= Transport in Viluppuram =

The town of Viluppuram in the Indian state of Tamil Nadu is well connected by both rail and road to other major cities in the state including Chennai, Trichy, Madurai, Salem, Thanjavur, Coimbatore, Dindigul and Vellore. And also other state major cities such as Bengaluru, Tirupati, Pondicherry and Mangalore. Viluppuram serves as one of the important railway junction of Tamil Nadu and Southern Railway Zone. The nearest domestic airport is Pondicherry, which has a daily chartered flight to Bengaluru. The nearest international airports are Chennai and Tiruchirappalli.

== Road ==
Viluppuram is well connected by roads to major cities and to the rest of the state. Viluppuram has the longest National roads of any district in Tamil Nadu. The major national highways of the town are:

- NH 45, which connects Chennai to Theni, via Viluppuram - Tiruchirapalli - Dindigul - Periyakulam.
- NH 45A, which connects Viluppuram to Nagapattinam via Pondicherry and Cuddalore.
- NH 234, which Connects Villupuram to Mangalore via Thiruvannamalai - Vellore - Gudiyatham.
- NH 45C, which connects (Viluppuram) Vikravandi to Thanjavur via Panruti - Neyveli - Kumbakonam and intersects with NH 45A in Koliyanur, about 5 km from Viluppuram.

Besides the above-mentioned national highways, several state highways also run through the district and town.

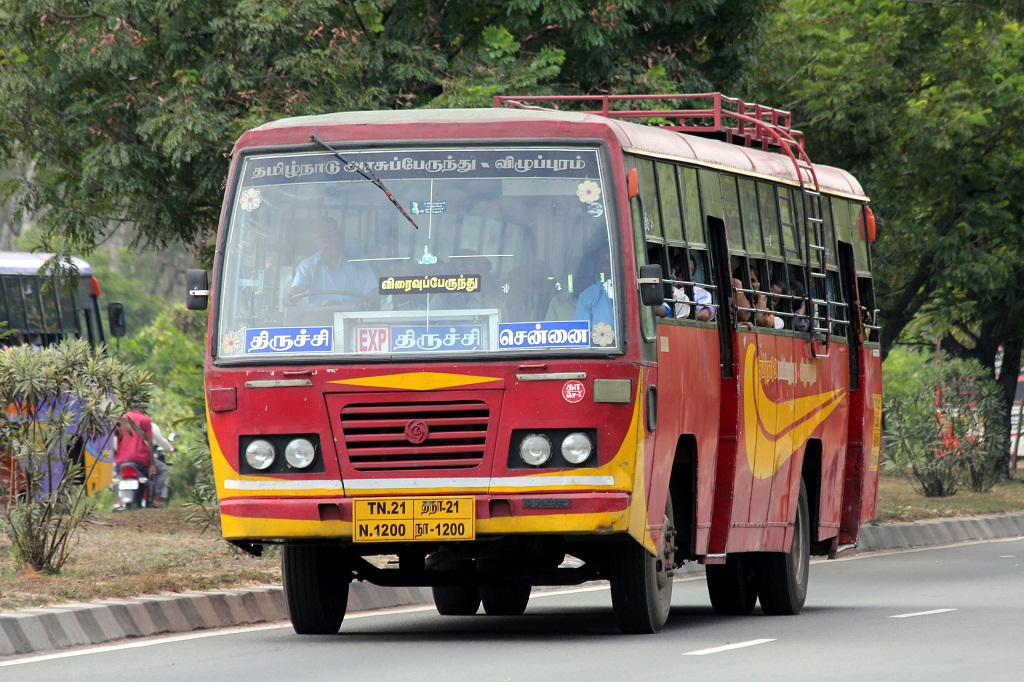
Chennai - Trichy intercity bus via Viluppuram

The town has a lot of buses frequently to major cities such as Chennai, Tiruchirapalli, Bangalore, Madurai, Salem, Pondicherry, Vellore etc. The town also serves the frequent bus services to nearby towns like Cuddalore, Thiruvannamalai, Tindivanam, Kallakurichi etc. Viluppuram is also the headquarters of the Tamil Nadu State Transport Corporation(TNSTC) - Viluppuram Division(the erstwhile Thanthai Periyar Transport Corporation [TPTC]). It is one of the six Tamil Nadu State Transport Corporation divisions serving the state.

=== Bus Stand ===
Viluppuram has two bus stands for public transport are Viluppuram Bus Station(Viluppuram New Bus Stand) and Viluppuram Old Bus Stand. Viluppuram Bus Station services the mofussil buses and SETC premium buses to major cities and towns. It is one of the largest bus terminus by area in Tamil Nadu. Viluppuram old bus stand is used for local town buses which has been operated by the TNSTC, Viluppuram division.

== Rail ==
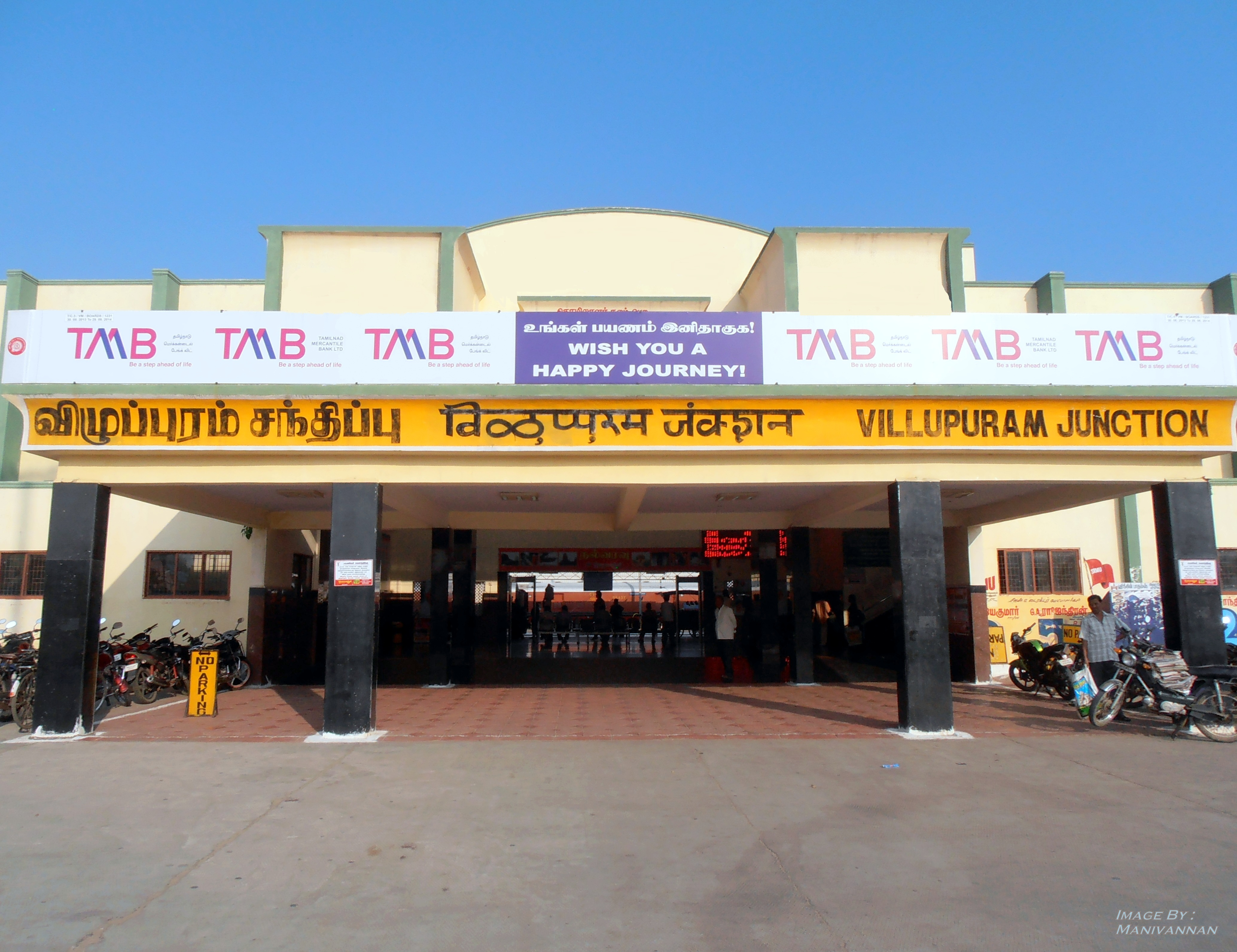
Viluppuram Railway Junction

Viluppuram has a well-known railway station. It was first built under the British. The Viluppuram Railway Junction at Viluppuram serves as the distribution point of rail traffic from Chennai, the state capital of Tamil Nadu, towards the southern part of the state. The station has daily trains to major cities like Chennai, Madurai, Tiruchirappalli, Salem, Pondicherry, Vellore, Coimbatore, Thoothukudi, Tirupati, Bangalore, Thiruvananthapuram, Mangalore, Vijayawada, Thirunelveli, Erode, Dindigul, Thanjavur, Alappuzha, Guntur etc, and also have weekly trains to Mumbai, Howrah, Delhi, Pune, Kharagpur, Visakhapatnam, Bhopal, Allahabad, Varanasi, Bhubaneswar, Nagpur etc,. It is one of the important junctions in Southern Railway. Five railway lines branch out of Viluppuram:

- Double Electrified BG (Broad Gauge) line towards Chennai Beach via Chengulpattu Junction.
- Electrified BG (Broad Gauge) line towards Tiruchirapalli Junction via Vridhachalam Junction and Ariyalur. Also called "Chord Line" to Tiruchirapalli.
- Non electrified BG (Broad Gauge) line towards Tiruchirapalli Junction via Cuddalore Port Junction, Mayiladuthurai Junction, Kumbakonam and Thanjavur Junction.
- Electrified BG (Broad Gauge) line towards Katpadi Junction via Tiruvannamalai and Vellore Cantonment.
- Electrified BG (Broad Gauge) line to Pondicherry.

Viluppuram railway station has been undergone a massive infrastructure upgrade to handle this traffic.

Train timetable as on 28-02-2018

No.	Name	Type	Zone	PF								From	Sch ↑↑	To	Sch
6004	Tirunelveli- Chennai...	Exp	SR	--						F		VM	00:20	MS	03:00
82602	Tirunelveli - Chenna...	Svd	SR	--		M						VM	00:20	MS	03:00
6001	Chennai Egmore- Tiru...	Exp	SR	--							S	VM	00:30	TEN	10:50
6003	Chennai Egmore - Tir...	Exp	SR	--					T			VM	00:35	TEN	10:00
6029	Chennai Egmore -Tuti...	Exp	SR	--			T					VM	00:35	TN	10:00
82601	Chennai Egmore - Ti...	Svd	SR	--							S	VM	00:35	TEN	10:00
16175	Chennai Egmore - Kar...	Exp	SR	4	S	M	T	W	T	F	S	VM	00:50	KIK	06:30
16185	Chennai Egmore - Vel...	Exp	SR	4	S	M	T	W	T	F	S	VM	00:50	VLNK	06:30
11064	Salem - Chennai Egmo...	Exp	CR	3	S	M	T	W	T	F	S	VM	00:55	MS	03:45
56101-Slip	Mettur Dam - Chennai...	Exp	SR	--	S	M	T	W	T	F	S	VM	00:55	MS	03:45
16860	Mangaluru Central - ...	Exp	SR	1	S	M	T	W	T	F	S	VM	01:10	MS	04:15
22623	Mahal Superfast Expr...	SF	SR	5		M					S	VM	01:15	MDU	08:40
16184	Uzhavan Express	Exp	SR	4,6	S	M	T	W	T	F	S	VM	01:15	MS	04:30
12654	Rock Fort (Malai Kot...	SF	SR	1	S	M	T	W	T	F	S	VM	01:30	MS	04:40
11063	Chennai Egmore - Sal...	Exp	CR	5	S	M	T	W	T	F	S	VM	01:30	SA	05:20
11063-Slip	Chennai Egmore - Met...	Exp	CR	5	S	M	T	W	T	F	S	VM	01:30	MTDM	08:25
16183	Uzhavan Express	Exp	SR	--	S	M	T	W	T	F	S	VM	01:30	TJ	06:10
16859	Chennai Egmore - Man...	Exp	SR	1	S	M	T	W	T	F	S	VM	01:55	MAQ	21:45
12638	Pandian SF Express (...	SF	SR	1	S	M	T	W	T	F	S	VM	02:00	MS	04:55
16176	Karaikkal - Chennai ...	Exp	SR	5	S	M	T	W	T	F	S	VM	02:10	MS	05:10
16186	Velankanni - Chennai...	Exp	SR	5	S	M	T	W	T	F	S	VM	02:10	MS	05:10
12653	Rock Fort (Malai Kot...	SF	SR	2	S	M	T	W	T	F	S	VM	02:10	TPJ	05:15
12668	Nagercoil - Chennai ...	SF	SR	2							S	VM	02:35	MS	05:30
16182	Silambu Express (PT)	Exp	SR	2		M				F		VM	02:35	MS	05:35
11043	Mumbai LTT(Kurla) - ...	Exp	CR	6							S	VM	02:40	MDU	10:10
16180	Mannai Express	Exp	SR	3	S	M	T	W	T	F	S	VM	02:40	MS	05:45
6030	Tuticorin - Chennai ...	Exp	SR	--				W				VM	02:45	MS	05:35
82606	Tuticorin - Chennai ...	Svd	SR	--				W				VM	02:45	MS	05:35
6087	Chennai Egmore - Kar...	Exp	SR	--			T					VM	02:50	KIK	08:30
12662	Pothigai SF Express ...	SF	SR	1	S	M	T	W	T	F	S	VM	02:55	MS	05:55
17413	Tirupati - Puducherr...	Exp	SCR	--	S							VM	03:05	PDY	04:05
12634	Kanniyakumari - Chen...	SF	SWR	1	S	M	T	W	T	F	S	VM	03:15	MS	06:25
16102	Boat Mail (Rameswara...	Exp	SR	--	S	M	T	W	T	F	S	VM	03:25	MS	06:35
16780	Rameswaram - Tirupat...	Exp	SR	1	S		T			F		VM	03:35	TPTY	10:15
12632	Nellai Superfast Exp...	SF	SR	1	S	M	T	W	T	F	S	VM	03:45	MS	06:55
22662	Sethu SF Express	SF	SR	1	S	M	T	W	T	F	S	VM	04:05	MS	07:05
22624	Mahal Superfast Expr...	SF	SR	3	S					F		VM	04:20	MS	07:20
6064	Nagercoil - Chennai ...	Exp	SR	--		M						VM	04:20	MS	07:20
82609	Nagercoil- Chennai E...	Svd	SR	--		M						VM	04:20	MS	07:20
12694	Pearl City (Muthu Na...	SF	SR	1	S	M	T	W	T	F	S	VM	04:25	MS	07:40
16862	Kanniyakumari - Pudu...	Exp	SR	4							S	VM	04:30	PDY	05:25
16724	Ananthapuri Express ...	Exp	SR	1	S	M	T	W	T	F	S	VM	04:50	MS	08:05
56882*	Villupuram - Tirupat...*	Pass	SR	2	S	M	T	W	T	F	S	VM	04:50	TPTY	12:40
6088	Karaikal - Chennai E...	Exp	SR	--				W				VM	05:05	MS	08:05
56860*	Villupuram - Tambara...*	Pass	SR	3	S	M	T	W	T	F	S	VM	05:25	TBM	08:30
12651	Tamil Nadu Sampark K...	SKr	SR	1	S		T					VM	05:55	NZM	18:00
12641	Thirukkural SF Expre...	SF	SR	--					T		S	VM	05:55	NZM	18:00
56873*	Villupuram Mayiladut...*	Pass	SR	6	S	M	T	W	T	F	S	VM	05:55	MV	09:10
16116	Puducherry - Chennai...	Exp	SR	1	S	M	T	W	T	F	S	VM	06:25	MS	09:30
11005	Dadar - Puducherry C...	Exp	CR	1,4	S		T	W				VM	06:25	PDY	07:15
16573	Yesvantpur-Puducherr...	Exp	SWR	4							S	VM	06:25	PDY	07:15
56861*	Villupuram - Puduche...*	Pass	SR	4	S	M	T	W	T	F	S	VM	06:55	PDY	07:45
12867	Howrah - Puducherry ...	SF	SER	4			T					VM	07:45	PDY	08:50
16106	Tiruchendur - Chenna...	Exp	SR	4	S	M	T	W	T	F	S	VM	08:25	MS	11:25
16856	Mangaluru Central - ...	Exp	SR	--							S	VM	08:50	PDY	10:00
16858	Mangaluru Central - ...	Exp	SR	--		M						VM	08:50	PDY	10:00
17414	Puducherry - Tirupat...	Exp	SCR	--	S							VM	09:15	TPTY	15:20
12606	Pallavan Superfast E...	SF	SR	1	S	M	T	W	T	F	S	VM	09:22	MS	12:10
17408	Pamani Express	Exp	SCR	3	S			W		F		VM	09:55	TPTY	16:35
15119	Rameswaram - Manduad...	Exp	NER	2					T			VM	10:00	MUV	04:45
56037	Chennai Egmore - Pud...	Pass	SR	--	S	M	T	W	T	F	S	VM	10:00	PDY	10:55
22403	Puducherry - New Del...	SF	NR	1				W				VM	10:00	NDLS	03:20
16793	Shraddha Sethu Expre...	Exp	SR	--		M						VM	10:00	FD	08:30
16127	Chennai Egmore - Gur...	Exp	SR	2	S	M	T	W	T	F	S	VM	10:55	GUV	05:50
16129	Chennai Egmore - Tut...	Exp	SR	1	S	M	T	W	T	F	S	VM	10:55	TN	20:30
16853	Cholan Express	Exp	SR	1	S	M	T	W	T	F	S	VM	11:10	TPJ	16:15
18496	Bhubaneswar - Ramesw...	Exp	ECoR	3							S	VM	11:20	RMM	23:00
12898	Bhubaneswar-Puducher...	SF	ECoR	--				W				VM	11:40	PDY	13:15
22604*	Villupuram - Kharagp...*	SF	SR	3			T	W				VM	11:40	KGP	19:25
22606*	Villupuram - Purulia...*	SF	SR	1							S	VM	11:40	PRR	23:05
12636	Vaigai SF Express	SF	SR	1	S	M	T	W	T	F	S	VM	11:50	MS	14:35
6025	Chennai Egmore - Tir...	SF	SR	5				W				VM	12:30	TPJ	15:15
16861	Puducherry - Kanniya...	Exp	SR	4					T			VM	12:40	CAPE	03:15
56041	Tirupati - Puducherr...	Pass	SR	--	S	M	T	W	T	F	S	VM	12:50	PDY	14:10
16863	Bhagat Ki Kothi - Ma...	Exp	SR	--							S	VM	12:55	MQ	17:15
12868	Puducherry - Howrah ...	SF	SER	1				W				VM	13:15	HWH	22:40
15120	Manduadih - Rameswar...	Exp	NER	4			T					VM	13:15	RMM	00:35
6063	Chennai Egmore - Nag...	Exp	SR	--		M						VM	13:25	NCJ	04:15
11017	Mumbai LTT - Karaika...	Exp	CR	5	S							VM	13:45	KIK	18:35
66046*	Villupuram - Melmaru...*	MEMU	SR	--	S	M	T	W	T	F	S	VM	13:55	MLMR	15:15
56863*	Villupuram - Puduche...*	Pass	SR	2	S	M	T	W	T	F	S	VM	14:15	PDY	15:05
56042	Puducherry - Tirupat...	Pass	SR	2	S	M	T	W	T	F	S	VM	14:20	TPTY	22:45
56875*	Villupuram - Mayilad...*	Pass	SR	6	S	M	T	W	T	F	S	VM	14:30	MV	17:40
16854	Cholan Express	Exp	SR	1	S	M	T	W	T	F	S	VM	14:55	MS	17:50
16351	Mumbai CSMT - Nagerc...	Exp	SR	3,4	S			W				VM	15:05	NCJ	04:15
56705*	Villupuram - Madurai...*	Pass	SR	3	S	M	T	W	T	F	S	VM	15:30	MDU	00:40
16352	Nagercoil - Mumbai C...	Exp	SR	2,3	S				T			VM	15:45	CSTM	20:50
12635	Vaigai SF Express	SF	SR	1	S	M	T	W	T	F	S	VM	15:55	MDU	21:20
56038	Puducherry - Chenna...	Pass	SR	5	S	M	T	W	T	F	S	VM	16:25	MS	20:10
56884*	Villupuram Tirupati ...*	Pass	SR	6	S	M	T	W	T	F	S	VM	16:35	TPTY	23:40
16864	Mannargudi - Bhagat ...	Exp	SR	--		M						VM	16:35	BGKT	17:50
17407	Pamani Express	Exp	SCR	1			T		T		S	VM	16:40	MQ	21:20
16128	Guruvayur - Chennai ...	Exp	SR	1	S	M	T	W	T	F	S	VM	17:15	MS	20:30
16130	Tuticorin - Chennai ...	Exp	SR	1	S	M	T	W	T	F	S	VM	17:15	MS	20:30
16855	Puducherry - Mangalu...	Exp	SR	--					T			VM	17:30	MAQ	09:30
16857	Puducherry - Mangalu...	Exp	SR	--							S	VM	17:30	MAQ	09:55
56877*	Villupuram-Mayiladut...*	Pass	SR	6	S	M	T	W	T	F	S	VM	17:40	MV	20:55
56865*	Villupuram-Puducherr...*	Pass	SR	2	S	M	T	W	T	F	S	VM	17:45	PDY	18:30
12605	Pallavan Superfast E...	SF	SR	4	S	M	T	W	T	F	S	VM	18:10	KKDI	23:00
6026	Tiruchchirappalli - ...	SF	SR	--							S	VM	18:20	MS	21:10
56886*	Villupuram - Katpadi...*	Pass	SR	--	S	M	T	W	T	F	S	VM	18:50	KPD	23:00
16105	Chennai Egmore - Tir...	Exp	SR	--	S	M	T	W	T	F	S	VM	18:50	TCN	08:20
11018	Karaikal - Mumbai LT...	Exp	CR	1		M						VM	18:55	LTT	23:45
12897	Puducherry - Bhubane...	SF	ECoR	1				W				VM	19:15	BBS	18:35
18495	Rameswaram - Bhubane...	Exp	ECoR	1	S							VM	19:15	BBS	18:35
12664	Tiruchchirappalli - ...	SF	SR	1			T			F		VM	19:15	HWH	03:10
12666	Kanniyakumari - Howr...	SF	SR	1							S	VM	19:15	HWH	03:10
16779	Tirupati - Rameswara...	Exp	SR	--	S		T			F		VM	19:50	RMM	07:35
12633	Chennai Egmore - Kan...	SF	SWR	4	S	M	T	W	T	F	S	VM	19:55	CAPE	06:15
16794	Shraddha Sethu Expre...	Exp	SR	--						F		VM	20:10	RMM	07:10
22661	Sethu SF Express	SF	SR	4	S	M	T	W	T	F	S	VM	20:30	RMM	04:35
6009	Santragachi - Puduch...	Exp	SR	--			T					VM	20:30	PDY	21:45
6010	Puducherry - Santrag...	Exp	SR	--							S	VM	20:30	SRC	04:30
12652	Tamil Nadu Sampark K...	SKr	SR	2				W		F		VM	20:50	MDU	03:25
12642	Thirukkural SF Expre...	SF	SR	3	S		T					VM	20:50	CAPE	08:45
12667	Chennai Egmore - Nag...	SF	SR	--					T			VM	21:15	NCJ	08:10
16115	Chennai Egmore - Pud...	Exp	SR	4	S	M	T	W	T	F	S	VM	21:20	PDY	22:25
11006	Puducherry - Dadar C...	Exp	CR	1	S		T	W				VM	21:35	DR	05:40
16574	Puducherry - Yesvant...	Exp	SWR	--							S	VM	21:40	YPR	08:20
16101	Boat Mail (Rameswara...	Exp	SR	5	S	M	T	W	T	F	S	VM	21:55	RMM	08:25
12693	Pearl City (Muthu Na...	SF	SR	1	S	M	T	W	T	F	S	VM	22:10	TN	06:35
16723	Ananthapuri Express ...	Exp	SR	4	S	M	T	W	T	F	S	VM	22:30	QLN	13:00
12631	Nellai Superfast Exp...	SF	SR	5	S	M	T	W	T	F	S	VM	22:45	TEN	07:10
12665	Howrah - Kanniyakuma...	SF	SR	--			T					VM	22:55	CAPE	10:25
16181	Silambu Express	Exp	SR	--				W			S	VM	22:55	SCT	09:20
12663	Howrah - Tiruchchira...	SF	SR	3		M				F		VM	23:00	TPJ	03:30
11044	Madurai - Mumbai LTT...	Exp	CR	1							S	VM	23:25	LTT	05:45
12661	Pothigai SF Express ...	SF	SR	4	S	M	T	W	T	F	S	VM	23:30	SCT	08:50
6002	Tirunelveli- Chennai...	Exp	SR	--	S							VM	23:45	MS	03:30
16179	Mannai Express	Exp	SR	5	S	M	T	W	T	F	S	VM	23:50	MQ	05:40
12637	Pandian SF Express (...	SF	SR	1	S	M	T	W	T	F	S	VM	23:58	MDU	05:55

== Air ==
The nearest airport is Pondicherry Airport at Pondicherry, in Puducherry, approximately 40 kilometres (25 mi) from Viluppuram. Pondicherry is now connected by Air India Regional with an ATR aircraft service six times a week except Wednesday. This is an afternoon service departing from Bengaluru and returning in the evening to Bengaluru.

The nearest major airport is Chennai International Airport (MAA), approximately 147 kilometres (91 mi) from the town; the next closest major airport is Tiruchirapalli Airport, approximately 160 kilometres (99 mi) away.
