= Valavanur =

- Selection grade town
- Location in Tamil Nadu, India
- Coordinates: 11.92°N 79.58°E
- Country: India
- State: Tamil Nadu
- District: Viluppuram
- Elevation: 76 m (249 ft)

Population (2021)
  - Total: 35,745

Languages
  - Official: Tamil
- Time zone: UTC+5:30 (IST)
- PIN: 605108
- Telephone code: 91-4146
- Vehicle registration: TN 32

Valavanur is a developing town and Suburb of city of Villupuram 7 KM away from Villupuram state of Tamil Nadu. It is situated near to the Tamil Nadu–Puducherry border on NH 45A.

== Geography ==
Valavanur is located at 11.92°N 79.58°E. It has an average elevation of (249 feet).

== Demographics ==
As of 2011 India census, Valavanur had a population of 16,745. Males constitute 60% of the population and females 40%. Valavanur has an average literacy rate of 85.82%, higher than the national average of 80.09%: male literacy is 91.93%, and female literacy is 79.68%. In Valavanur, 10.99% of the population is under 6 years of age. Major occupation is garments and some exports (Hair and Tapioca chips) to other states and country. There is a considerable amount of sugarcane cultivation done here due to the presence of many sugarcane factories nearby. People here go to work in factories and mills (where a large number of factories and mills situated around this city). Well connected to Pondicherry, Villupuram and Cuddalore cities.

== Transport ==
Valavanur is on the national highway (NH 45A) from Villupuram to Nagapattinam via Pondicherry. It is about 29 kilometres (18 mi) from Pondicherry. There are plenty of buses running from Villupuram to Pondicherry which stop at Valavanur.

The Valavanur railway station is on the Villupuram–Pondicherry railway line. There are daily passenger trains from both cities passing here. It is also connected to Chennai and Tirupati by fast passenger trains. Being a halting stop, express trains do not stop here. The nearest major railway station is Villupuram (8 km).
