= Villupuram–Pondicherry branch line =

Rail line in India

Overview
- Status: Operational
- Owner: Indian Railways
- Locale: Tamil Nadu
- Termini: Viluppuram Junction (VM); Puducherry (PDY)

Service
- Operator: Southern Railway zone

History
- Opened: 16 December 1879; 146 years ago

Technical
- Track length: Branch lines: VM–PDY (38 kilometres (24 mi))
- Electrification: 25 kV AC 50 Hz; Single-line electrification
- Operating speed: 100 km/h (62 mph)
- Highest elevation: Viluppuram Junction 45 metres (148 ft); Puducherry 6 metres (20 ft)

The Villupuram Junction–Puducherry (Pondy) branch line is a single electrified railway line run from Viluppuram Junction, where it splits off the Chennai Egmore–Thanjavur main line, and Puducherry.

== History ==
The line was originally built in the late nineteenth century and crossed between British and French territory at the Sankaraparani River. It opened on 16 December 1879. The line once had spur to major textile mill in Pondicherry as well as to its port. Before broad gauge conversion, trains between Puducherry and Villupuram halted at Palliyaneliyanur.

As of 2019, there were plans to develop the intermediate station infrastructure to increase capacity on the line.

== Services ==
The branch line serves superfast express trains bound for Howrah, Bhubaneswar, and New Delhi. There are also standard express trains serving several destinations, and local trains that run among the whole branch line.

== Stations ==
| Km | Image | Station | Code | Location | Coordinates | Elevation |
|---|---|---|---|---|---|---|
| 0 | | Viluppuram Junction | VM | Viluppuram | 11.9426°N 79.4997°E | 44 metres (144 ft) |
| 10 | | Valavanur | VRA | Viluppuram district | 11.9180°N 79.5742°E | 37 metres (121 ft) |
| 22 | | Chinna Babu Samudram | CBU | NH 45A, Villupuram district | 11.9203°N 79.6867°E | 23 metres (75 ft) |
| 30 | | Villianur | VI | NH 45A Sulthanpet, Villianur, Villianur taluk, Puducherry | 11.9202°N 79.7583°E | 11 metres (36 ft) |
| 38 | | Puducherry | PDY | Pondicherry | 11.9250°N 79.8281°E | |

=== Viluppuram Junction ===
Located in Villupuram, Tamil Nadu, Viluppuram Junction railway station is where the branch line connects with the main line and several other branch lines that originate there.

=== Valavanur ===
Valavanur station is located in the Viluppuram district of the Indian state of Tamil Nadu, India. It was once an import depot for the shipment of peanut oil.

The station consists of 1 platform on a single track. As of 2019 there were plans to expand the station with a line block and siding to accommodate through service trains.

=== Chinna Babu Samudram ===
Chinna Babu Samudram station is also located in the Viluppuram district. It was a former customs hub between the former British and French territories. The station has three tracks, with a single side platform serving the southernmost track.

=== Villianur ===
Villianur station serves the town of Villianur. It consists of a single side platform serving a single track. Like with Valavanur station, there are plans to implement a line block at this station.

=== Puducherry ===
The Puducherry railway station, located in Pondicherry, is the terminus station.
