= Peralam–Karaikal line =

Railway line in India

Peralam–Karaikal Railway line

Overview
- Status: Under Construction
- Owner: French East India Company (former); Indian Railways (present)
- Locale: Tamil Nadu; Puducherry
- Termini: Peralam Junction (PEM); Karaikal (KIK)
- Stations: 4
- Website: www.sr.indianrailways.gov.in

Service
- Type: Regional rail Heavy rail Light rail
- Services: 1
- Operator(s): Great South Indian Railway (former); South Indian Railway Company (later); Southern Railway zone (present)
- Depot: Golden Rock
- Rolling stock: 0-6-0

History
- Planned opening: December 2024
- Opened: 14 March 1898; 128 years ago
- Closed: 1987; 39 years ago

Technical
- Line length: 23 km (14 mi)
- Track gauge: 1,676 mm (5 ft 6 in)
- Old gauge: 1,000 mm (3 ft 3 3/8 in)
- Electrification: Yes
- Operating speed: 50 km/h (31 mph)

The Peralam–Karaikal line is a branch line connects Peralam, Tamil Nadu with Karaikal, Puducherry in South India. It is the one and only unconverted railway line in Puducherry union territory and one of the few unconverted railway lines in southern railway zone. This line is one of the cauvery delta railway line which falls under Tiruchirappalli division.

It was one of the 4 unconverted railway lines in south India. The other 3 were the Mayiladuthurai Junction to Tranquebar railway line and Thiruthuraipoondi Junction to Point Calimere Railway line and Bodinayakkanur - Madurai railway line.The Madurai to Bodinayakkanur railway line section via Theni is already converted to broad gauge and electrified.

The three railway lines, Tranquebar railway line, Peralam-Karaikal railway line and Point Calimere railway line were closed during the 1980s due to poor patronage citing unviability. But now they are under consideration for conversion to broad gauge lines.

On the 2020–21 February Indian budget ₹88 crores were sanctioned for this line out of the total ₹177 crores. And all railway work on this line is planned to be completed by December 2024.

== History ==
This metre gauge branch line between Peralam Junction and Karaikal was approved for construction by French India during December 1895. The French government invested about 1,201,840 ₣ (approximately ₹1.51 crore (US$160,000) in 2014) for the construction, which was done by the then Great South Indian Railway (which was later merged with South Indian Railway Company) and opened on 14 March 1898.

Due to persistent demand from various quarters, revival of line gained momentum for surveying the feasibility outside the purview of Railway Budget, which proposed a rough estimate of about ₹110 crore (US$11 million). Officially, the line was taken up for survey as the announcement came in the 2013–2014 Railway Budget, at an outlay of ₹10 lakh (US$10,000) and at an estimate of about ₹120 crore (US$12 million) for full-fledged activities. Apart from retaining the four railway stations in the past and laying broad gauge tracks in the same old path, detour lines of about 1.5 kilometres (0.93 mi) is planned at Peralam Junction and about 2 kilometres (1.2 mi) for Tirunallar yard. In June 2019 tenders were floated for the execution of the project, expecting to complete it by March 2021.

== Route ==
With a route length of 23.5 kilometres (14.6 mi), the line had four stations Ambagarattur, Paruttikudi, Thirunallar and Karikovilpathu within a stretch of 15.5 kilometres (9.6 mi) up to Karaikal, all falling within the territory of French India (now Karaikal district). The rest of 8 kilometres (5.0 mi) between Ambagarattur and Peralam falls within British India region (now Tiruvarur district).

== Operations ==
=== Passenger services ===
Though owned by French India, the operations were transferred to the then Great South Indian Railway in accordance with agreement signed in 1902. There were 4 up-and-down services, but due improvement in road connectivity the earnings dropped and subsequently the services were reduced to one in 1943. After Indian Independence and Railway Re-organisation, the line fell into the jurisdiction of Tiruchirappalli railway division. In 1967, citing under utilisation of the line for passenger traffic in its transport survey, the National Council for Applied and Economic Research recommended for closure of the line.

=== Freight services ===
This line provided rail connectivity to Karaikal port and transfer of goods through rail into British India, as this line would give further connectivity to Mayiladuthurai Junction, which falls on the main line. Cement, fertilisers, tiles, timber, kerosene oil, rice, wheat, grains, pulses and paddy were the main goods involved in traffic. Raw materials like pressed cotton and coal for textile mills and iron billets for Pondicherry Rolling Mills were brought in, processed and the finished product was supplied all over the country. Though the goods traffic density fared better, the passenger traffic slumped and services were called off except the rolling stock.

== See also ==
- Tiruchirappalli division
- Indian Railways
