= Tharangambadi railway station =

Railway station in Tamil Nadu

Tharangambadi Junction
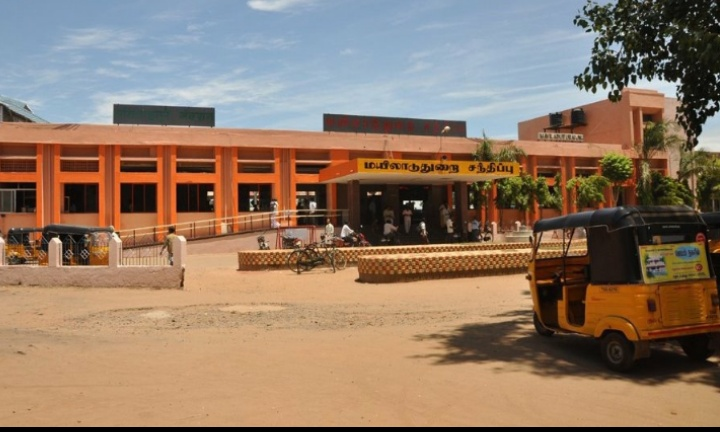
- Tharangambadi Junction

General information
- Other names: Danish Railway Line
- Location: Railway Cross Road, Mayiladuthurai, Mayiladuthurai, Tamil Nadu; India
- Coordinates: 11.0951°N 79.6284°E
- Elevation: 17 metres (56 ft)
- System: Indian Railways station
- Owner: Indian Railways
- Operator: Southern Railway zone
- Line: MAYILADUTHURAI-THARANGAMBADI(UNDER GC)
- Platforms: 5
- Tracks: 8
- Connections: Bus stand, Taxicab stand, Auto rickshaw stand

Construction
- Structure type: Standard (on ground station)-
- Parking: Yes
- Accessible: Disabled access

Other information
- Status: Functioning
- Station code: TQB
- Zone(s): Southern Railway
- Division(s): Tiruchirapalli

History
- Electrified: Ongoing
Location
- Location within Tamil Nadu

Tharangambadi Junction (station code: TQB) is a junction railway station serving the town of Tharangambadi in Mayiladuthurai District of Tamil Nadu, India.

The station is a part of the Tiruchirappalli railway division of the Southern Railway zone and connects the town to various parts of the state as well as the rest of the country. It is classified as an "A" category railway station in the Trichy railway division of the Southern Railway Zone. And now it is electrified and some trains runs with the help of electric locos. There are 2 routes originating from this junction and a single line touches in this junction they are: Mayiladuthurai to Tharangambadi (this line has only in gauge conversion work going on, but no works are started in last 25 years and now also), Mayiladuthurai to Thiruvarur (this line has electrified), and the Chennai to Tiruchirapalli line called main line also connected in Mayiladuthurai junction. There was another station which served eastern part of the town called Mayuram Town [station code: MVM]. Railways had done DPR's multiple times for Mayiladuthurai - Tharangambadi - Karaikal as current route is circular route which connects port with Salem Junction. Major revenue generation of Tiruchirapalli division comes from Freight services connecting Karaikal port with Salem and other parts of Tamilnadu. Govt is considering a new line in Mayiladuthurai - Karaikal as this is viable option for easier transport of goods. Also there is another proposal to connect Karaikal - Salem via Karaikal - Mayiladuthurai - Jayamkondam - Ariyalur - Perambalur - Salem

== Location and layout ==
The railway station is located off the Sarathattai Street, Railway Cross Road south-west of Mayiladthurai. The nearest bus depot is located in Mayiladuthurai while the nearest airport is situated 138 kilometres (86 mi) away in Tiruchirappalli.

== Lines ==
The station is a focal point of the historic main line that connects Chennai with Thanjavur Junction via Cuddalore. An additional line branches out to Peralam Junction, which connects to Tiruvarur Junction and Karaikal.

- Fully Electrified BG single line towards Chennai Egmore via Cuddalore Port Junction, Viluppuram Junction, Chengalpattu Junction and Tambaram.
- Fully Non Electrified BG single line towards Karaikkudi Junction via Thiruvarur Junction.
- Fully Electrified BG single line towards Thanjavur Junction.
- Non functional MG single line towardtharangambadi terminal station
