= PDY =

PDY may refer to:

- Paralel Devlet Yapılanması, "Parallel State Structure", Turkish government propaganda term for the Gülen movement
- People's Democratic Republic of Yemen, South Yemen, obsolete UNDP country code
- Puducherry (union territory), South India
- Puducherry district in the union territory
- Puducherry railway station, station code
