= Pattakudi railway station =

Railway station in Pattakudi, Karaikal district, Puducherry

Pattakudi

General information
- Location: Pattakudi, Karaikal district India
- Coordinates: 10.9523°N 79.7686°E
- Elevation: 5 metres (16 ft)
- System: Indian Railways station
- Owner: Indian Railways
- Operator: Southern Railway zone
- Line: Peralam–Karaikal line
- Platforms: 2
- Tracks: 3
- Connections: Auto stand

Construction
- Structure type: Standard (on-ground station)
- Parking: No
- Cycle facilities: No

Other information
- Status: Construction
- Station code: PCD
- Zone(s): Southern Railway zone
- Division(s): Tiruchirappalli

Services
| Preceding station | Indian Railways | Following station |
|---|---|---|
| Ambagarattur towards | Southern Railway zone Peralam–Karaikal line | Thirunallaru towards |
Location

Pattakudi railway station is a railway station in Karaikal district, Puducherry, India. Its code is PCD. The station consists of 2 platforms. The platform is not well sheltered. It lacks many facilities including water and sanitation.
