= Viluppuram Bus Station =

Bus station in Tamil Nadu, India

Viluppuram New Bus Stand
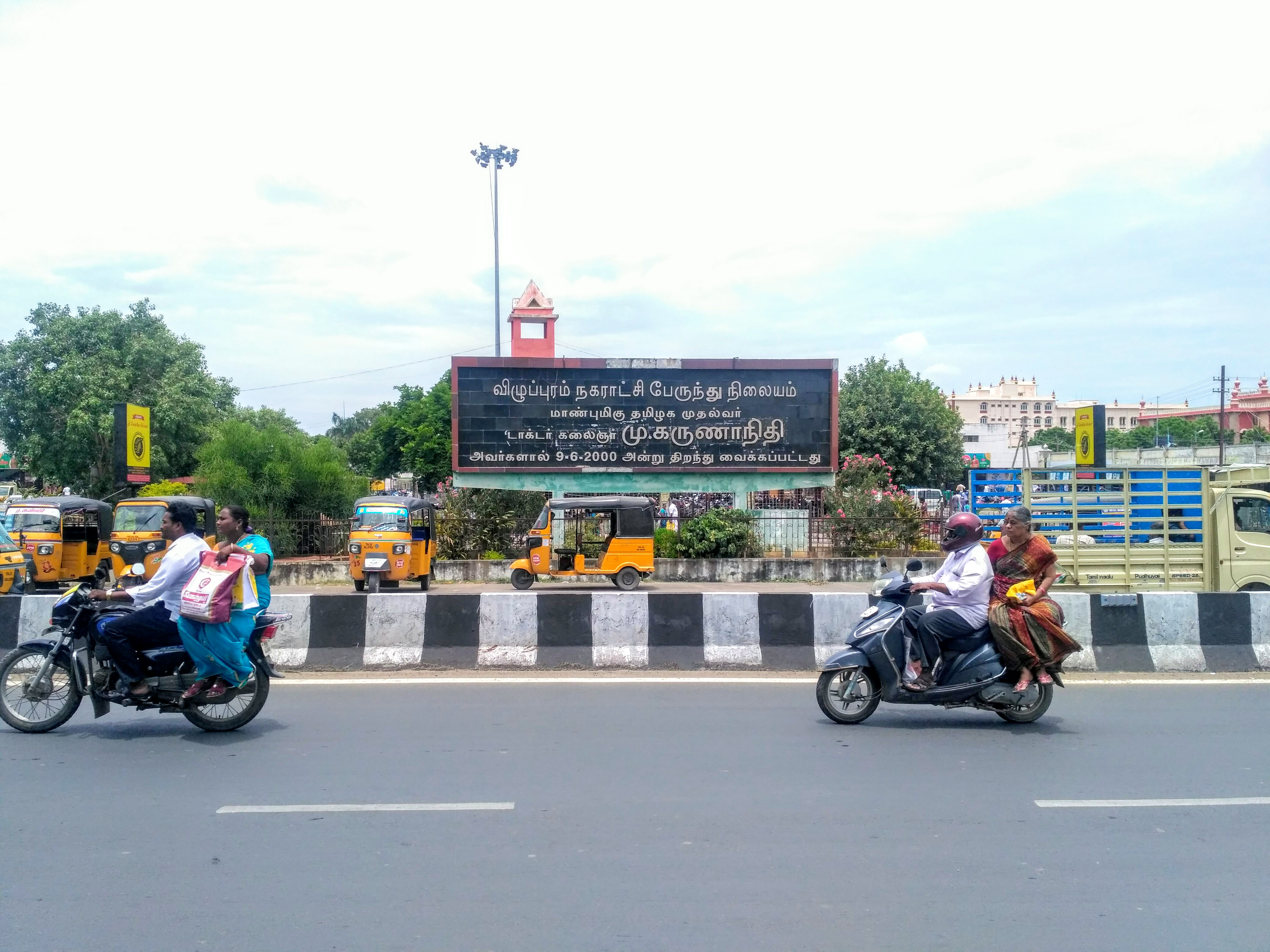

General information
- Location: Trichy Trunk Road, Viluppuram, Tamil Nadu. PIN – 605602. India
- Coordinates: 11.7416°N 78.9627°E
- Owner: Viluppuram Municipality
- Operator: Department of Transport (Tamil Nadu)
- Platforms: 3 (67 Bays)

Construction
- Parking: Yes
- Cycle facilities: Yes
- Accessible: Disabled access

Other information
- Fare zone: TNSTC Viluppuram Division

History
- Opened: 2000; 26 years ago
Location

Viluppuram Bus Station, popularly known as Villupuram New Bus Stand, is one of the bus terminus of Viluppuram, the other being the Viluppuram Old Bus Stand that is primarily used for intra-city buses. The bus station is located 2 kilometres (1.2 mi) away from the town's major railhead Viluppuram Junction. Tamil Nadu State Transport Corporation services both mofussil and town buses to the station. By area-wise it is one of the largest bus terminus in Tamil Nadu.

== Services ==
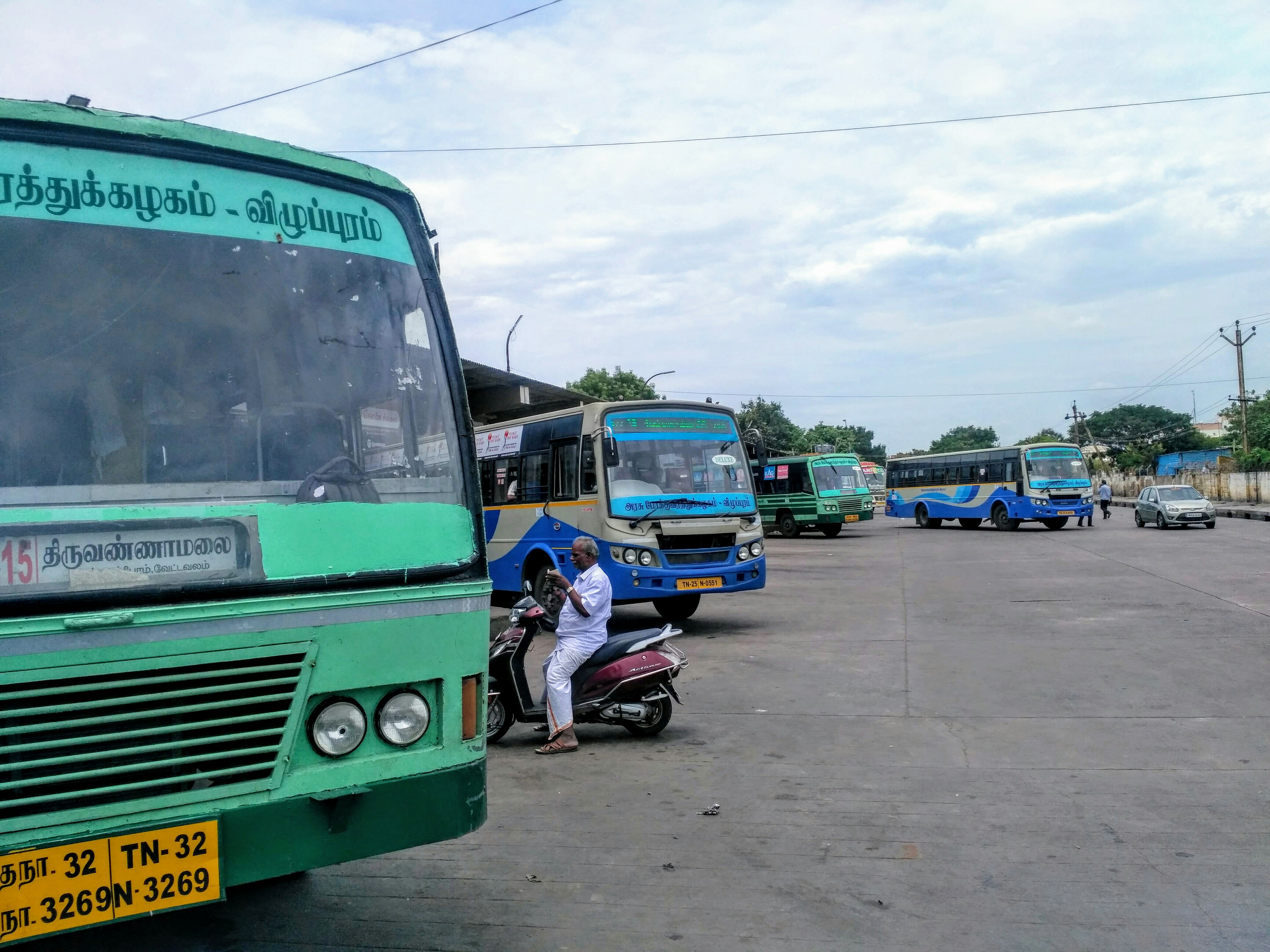

Due to the town's location between Chennai and Tiruchirapalli, all south-bound buses from State capital Chennai have to pass the terminus. The terminus is managed by Department of Transport (Tamil Nadu). This terminus servicing the premium buses which are operated by SETC.

Platform	Destinations
1	Puducherry, Vellore, Tindivanam, Thirukovilur, Arani, Tirupati, Tiruvannamalai, Krishnagiri, Dharmapuri, Bengaluru and Gingee
2	Chennai, Tiruchirapalli, Kanchipuram, Panruti, Neyveli, Hosur and Cuddalore
3	Thiruvananthapuram, Madurai, Tirunelveli, Palani, Erode, Tiruppur, Salem, Coimbatore, Mayiladuthurai, Kumbakonam, Thanjavur, Ulundurpet, Sankarapuram and Kallakurichi

== Connections ==
The bus station is located 2 kilometres (1.2 mi) from the town's major rail head Viluppuram Junction, one of the largest and important station in the Southern Railway Zone.
