= Peralam Junction railway station =

Railway station in Tamil Nadu, India

Peralam Junction

General information
- Location: Nannilam taluk, Thiruvarur road, Peralam, Tamil Nadu, Pincode-609405; India
- Coordinates: 10°57′28″N 79°39′24″E
- Elevation: 11 metres (36 ft)
- System: Indian Railways station
- Owner: Indian Railways
- Operator: Southern Railway
- Lines: Chennai Egmore–Thiruvarur branch line (towards MV and TVR); Peralam–Karaikal line (towards KIK)
- Platforms: 3
- Tracks: 4
- Connections: Bus stand, Taxicab stand, Auto rickshaw stand

Construction
- Structure type: Standard (on-ground station)
- Parking: Yes
- Accessible: Yes

Other information
- Status: Functioning
- Station code: PEM
- Zone(s): Southern Railway
- Division(s): Tiruchirapalli

History
- Opened: 1898; 128 years ago
Location
- Location within Tamil Nadu

Peralam Junction railway station (station code: PEM) is an NSG–6 category Indian railway station in Tiruchirappalli railway division of Southern Railway zone. It is a railway junction station serving the town of Peralam in Tamil Nadu, India.

== Background ==
The railway station became functional when the Peralam–Karaikal line was opened by Great South Indian Railway (which was later merged with South Indian Railway Company) on 14 March 1898. The nearest bus services were available at Peralam town itself while the nearest airport is situated 90 kilometres (56 mi) away at Tiruchirappalli and the nearest port is Karaikal Port.

== Lines ==
Three lines emerges from this junction station, of which one line proceeds north towards Mayiladuthurai Junction, the other line proceeds east and enters immediately into the Union Territory of Puducherry heading for Karaikal and the other one proceeds southwards to Thiruvarur Junction.
