= Cuddalore Port Junction railway station =

Railway station in Tamil Nadu

Cuddalore Port Junction
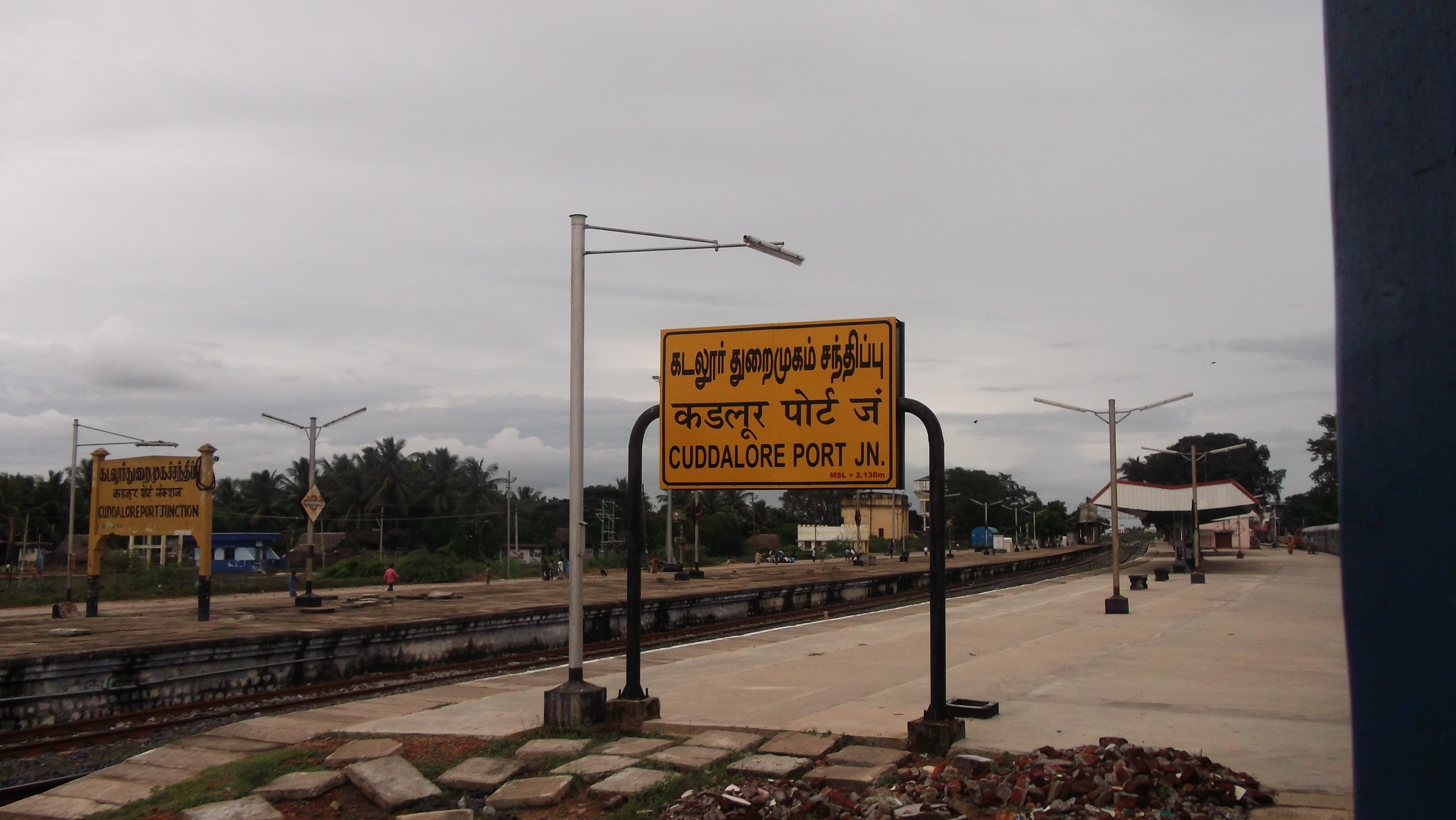

General information
- Location: NH 45A, Cuddalore Township, Cuddalore district, Tamil Nadu, Pincode-607003
- Coordinates: 11.7149°N 79.7662°E
- Elevation: 4 m (13 ft)
- System: Indian Railways station
- Owner: Indian Railways
- Operator: Southern Railway zone
- Lines: Chennai Egmore–Thanjavur main line Vriddhachalam–Cuddalore branch line
- Platforms: 4
- Tracks: 5

Construction
- Structure type: At-grade
- Parking: Yes
- Accessible: Disabled access

Other information
- Status: Functioning
- Station code: CUPJ
- Zone(s): Southern Railway
- Division(s): Tiruchirapalli
Route map
Location
- Location within Tamil Nadu Location within India

Cuddalore Junction (station code: CUPJ) is an NSG–5 category Indian railway station in Tiruchirappalli railway division of Southern Railway zone. It is a junction station serving the City of Cuddalore. The station is a part of the Trichy division of the Southern Railway zone and its official code is CUPJ. Its old name is Cuddalore Junction and the station code then was COT.

== Location and layout ==
The Junction falls on the Chennai Egmore–Thanjavur main line. Three railway lines diverge from here. One leads to Viluppuram Junction; another one to Mayiladuthurai Junction and the last one to Vriddhachalam Junction.

The Junction has four platforms & one stabling line, which is more used for handling freight trains. Parcel movement to/from Cuddalore Port Jn. is quite high. Cuddalore Port Junction also witnesses good amount of originating/terminating freight traffic. The junction also has facilities for handling container cargo.

== Importance ==
Cuddalore Port Junction was one of the 9 scheduled halts in Southern Railway for the Science Express (Science Exhibition on Wheels), Phase VI, focusing on Bio-diversity.
