= Chennai Egmore–Thanjavur main line =

Railway line in India

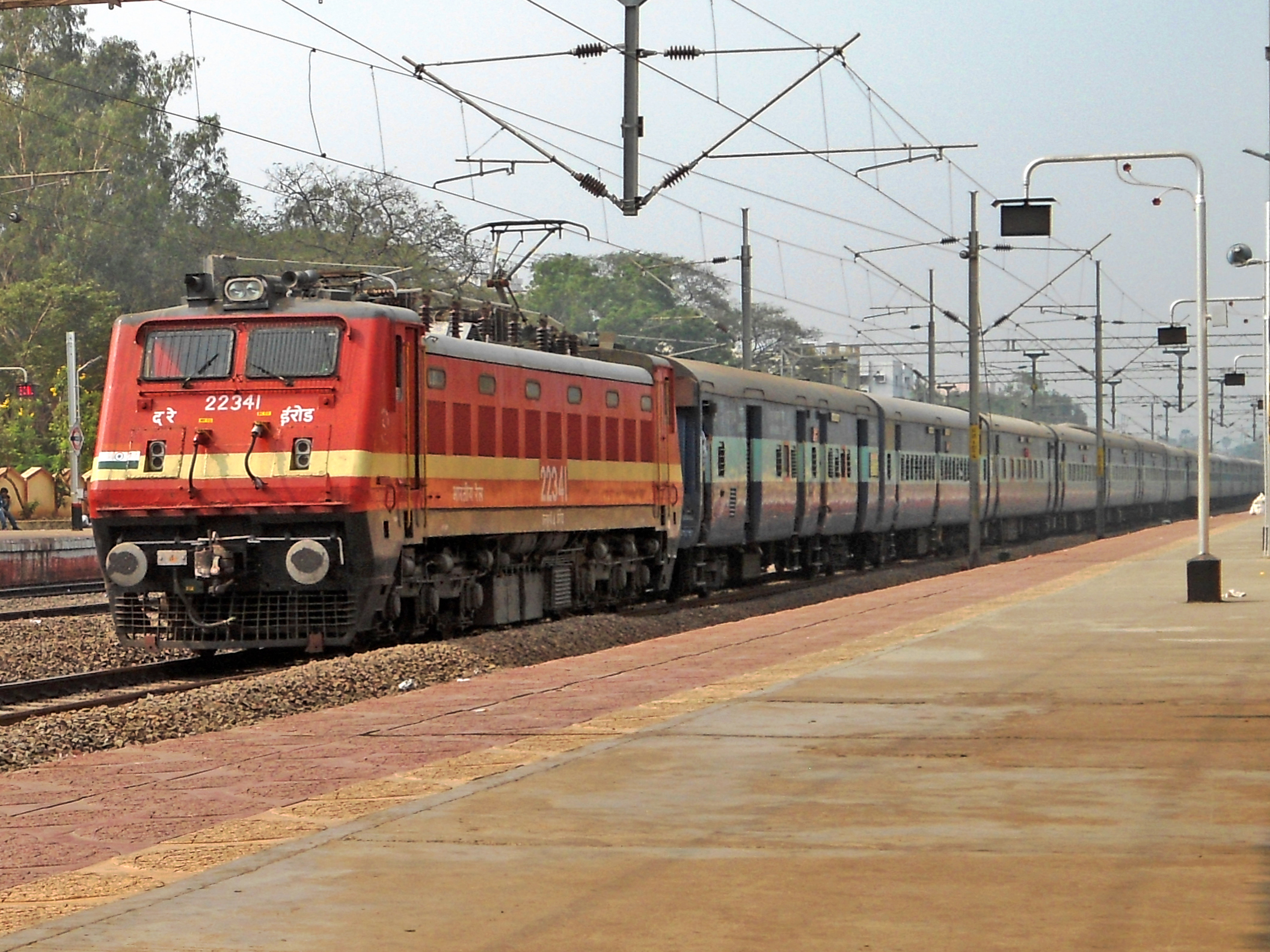
- Tiruchchirapalli–Chennai Cholan Express is the prestigious train on Chennai Egmore–Thanjavur route.

Overview
- Status: Operational
- Owner: Indian Railways
- Locale: Tamil Nadu
- Termini: Chennai Egmore (MS); Thanjavur Junction (TJ)

Service
- Operator: Southern Railway zone

History
- Opened: 1880; 146 years ago

Technical
- Track length: Main line: 351 km (218 mi); Branch lines: CGL–AJJ (63 kilometres (39 mi)); VM–PDY (38 kilometres (24 mi)); CUPJ–VRI (61 kilometres (38 mi)); MV–TVR (39 kilometres (24 mi))
- Track gauge: 1,676 mm (5 ft 6 in)
- Old gauge: 1,000 mm (3 ft 3 3/8 in)
- Electrification: Yes
- Highest elevation: Chennai Egmore 8 metres (26 ft); Thanjavur 60 metres (200 ft)

The Chennai Egmore–Thanjavur main line (via Villupuram, Cuddalore & Mayiladuthurai) connects Chennai Egmore and Thanjavur Junction both in the Indian state of Tamil Nadu. The Chennai Egmore–Thanjavur main line is part of Chennai–Viluppuram–Chidambaram-Mayiladuthurai–Kumbakonam–Thanjavur–Tiruchirappalli line. There are several branch lines (included here): Chengalpattu–Arakkonam links to Chennai Central–Bengaluru City line, Guntakal–Chennai Egmore section, Viluppuram–Puducherry, Cuddalore–Virudhachalam, Mayiladuthurai–Thiruvarur, and Peralam–Nagapattinam sectors. The line connects the Kaveri delta to Chennai.

== History ==
The "main line" of the metre-gauge railway system in the Coromandel Coast connected Chennai with Tiruchchirappalli via Viluppuram, Cuddalore, Chidambaram, Mayiladuthurai, Kumbakonam, and Thanjavur junctions. The Chennai–Mayiladuthurai–Thanjavur–Tiruchirappalli line continues to be thought of as the "main line".

In 1861 the Great Southern of India Railway (GSIR) built the 125 km (78 mi)-long 1,676 mm (5 ft 6 in) wide 5 ft 6 in (1,676 mm) broad gauge line between Nagapattinam and Tiruchirapalli (then known as Trichinopoly) and the line was opened to traffic next year. It was a new development south of Chennai. After taking over of GSIR by South Indian Railway Company in 1874, the Nagapattinam–Tiruchirapalli line was converted to 1,000 mm (3 ft 3 3/8 in)-wide metre gauge in 1875. Again after conversion, the 125 km (78 mi)-long 1,676 mm (5 ft 6 in)-wide broad-gauge line between Nagapattinam and Tiruchirapalli was opened in 2001–02.

The South India Railway Company laid a 715 km (444 mi)-long metre-gauge trunk line from Chennai to Thoothukudi via Viluppuram, Cuddalore Port (then known as Cuddalore Junction), Mayiladuthurai (then known as Mayavaram), Thanjavur, Tiruchirapalli (then known as Trichinopoly), Madurai, Virudhunagar in 1880. The 84 km (52 mi)-long Tindivanam–Cuddalore Port (then known as Cuddalore Junction) sector, 27.60 km (17 mi) long Cuddalore Port–Porto Novo sector and 19.71 km (12 mi) long Shyali–Mayiladuthurai sector were opened in 1877, thereby connecting Tindivanam to the already opened Tiruchirappalli–Nagapattinam line. But during gauge conversion in years 1995–2000 the 84 km (52 mi)-long Tindivanam–Cuddalore Port (then known as Cuddalore Junction) sector, 27.60 km (17 mi)-long Cuddalore Port–Porto Novo sector & 19.71 km (12 mi)-long Shyali–Mayiladuthurai sector were never made into 1,676 mm (5 ft 6 in)-wide 5 ft 6 in (1,676 mm) broad gauge line.

Following an agreement between the British and the French, a 38 km (24 mi)-long metre-gauge line was laid between Puducherry and Viluppuram around 1877–1879.

A 1,067 mm (3 ft 6 in)-wide line was laid between Arakkonam and Kanchipuram (then known as Conjeevaram) in 1865 by Indian Tramway Company. The line was converted to metre gauge in 1878 and opened in 1891. The Chengalpattu–Walajabad line was opened in 1880.

Viluppuram was connected to Vriddhachalam in 1927 by a 55 km (34 mi)-long railway track.

The 36 km (22 mi)-long Mayiladuthurai–Tharangambadi (then known as Tranquebar) line which was opened by British for people in 1926 and was closed in 1987 for broad gauge conversion. But the project is standing still for 39 years now.

== Suburban railway ==
A major part of the South Line, Chennai Suburban is part of this line. The area south of Chennai was served by a single line shared by passenger and goods trains till 1931. Electric trains in the sector were planned as early as 1923. Construction work began in 1926 and was completed in 1931. A new line for electric trains was added between Chennai Beach and Egmore, and two lines were added between Egmore and Tambaram. The first MG EMU services were run on 1.5 kV DC overhead lines on 11 May 1931. In the 1960s the Chennai Beach–Tambaram–Viluppuram sector was converted from 1.5 kV DC traction to 25 kV AC traction and limited EMU services were extended to Chengalpet. In 1969, an additional metre-gauge track was laid between Tambaram and Chengalpet. Starting with the 1995s the entire area was converted to broad gauge.

== Gauge conversions ==
With the conversion from metre gauge to broad gauge, the entire 494 km (307 mi)-long Egmore–Tambaram–Tiruchirapalli–Dindigul–Madurai sector was completed, broad-gauge passenger traffic was initiated in March 2001. The left over conversion work was then completed and the last metre-gauge EMU service ran between Tambaram and Egmore on 1 July 2004.

Conversion from metre gauge to broad gauge of the Viluppuram–Puducherry branch line was completed in 2004. The Cuddalore Port Junction–Vriddhachalam sector was converted in 2003. After conversion work of the Thanjavur–Tiruvarur broad-gauge section was opened to traffic in 2006 and Tiruvarur–Nagore section in 2010.

The 192 km (119 mi)-long Viluppuram–Thanjavur was converted to broad gauge in 2010.

A broad-gauge line (conversion from metre-gauge) connecting Chengalpattu with Arakkonam was built in 1999–2000. The Thakolam–Arakkonam sector had to be realigned because of its proximity to the Arakkonam Naval Air Station. Thakolam–Arakkonam sector as diverted another route start near Thakolam to Melpadi Goods Yard route end Complete 2019. This new route fully electrified complete Chengalpattu–Arakkonam line

== Electrification ==
The metre-gauge track of Madras Beach–Tambaram sector was electrified in 1931 with 1.5 kV DC overhead system. In the 1950s, Indian Railways decided on using 25 kV AC overhead system on a national basis. The Madras Beach–Tambaram sector was converted to 25 kV AC overhead system in 1967.

The Tambaram–Chengalpattu–Viluppuram sector was electrified in 1964–65 and then again in 2000–01 (after gauge conversion) along with the Chengalpattu–Kanchipuram sector.

The broad-gauge Viluppuram–Puducherry line was electrified in 2006.

The broad-gauge Viluppuram–Tiruchirapalli sector was electrified in 2010.

New electrification survey in 2012–13 had been sanctioned in the Railway Budget for the Karaikkal/Karaikkal port–Thiruvarur–Thanjavur–Tiruchchirappalli and Nagapattinam–Velankkani sectors.

The execution of electrification of Villupuram–Cuddalore Port–Chidambaram-Mayiladuthurai–Kumbakonam–Thanjavur and Mayiladuthurai–Thiruvarur has been given to Rail Vikas Nigam.

The main line (Villupuram to Tiruchirappalli via Mayiladuthurai) electrification was completed in several parts [as Tiruchirappalli to Thanjavur, Villupuram to Cuddalore Port Junction, Cuddalore Port Junction to Mayiladuthurai Junction and then Mayiladuthurai Junction to Thanjavur Junction] and opened for end to end travel for public on 14 November 2020.

== Railway reorganization ==
The Great Southern Railway of India and Carnatic Railway merged to form South Indian Railway Company in 1874.

In the early 1950s legislation was passed authorizing the central government to take over independent railway systems that were there. On 14 April 1951 the Madras and Southern Mahratta Railway, the South Indian Railway Company and Mysuru State Railway were merged to form Southern Railway. Subsequently, Nizam's Guaranteed State Railway was also merged into Southern Railway. On 2 October 1966, the Secunderabad, Solapur, Hubli and Vijayawada Divisions, covering the former territories of Nizam's Guaranteed State Railway and certain portions of Madras and Southern Mahratta Railway were separated from Southern Railway to form the South Central Railway. In 1977, Guntakal division of Southern Railway was transferred to South Central Railway and the Solapur division transferred to Central Railway. Amongst the seven new zones created in 2010 was South Western Railway, which was carved out of Southern Railway.
