= Mayiladuthurai Junction railway station =

Railway station in Tamil Nadu

Mayiladuthurai Junction Mayavaram Junction
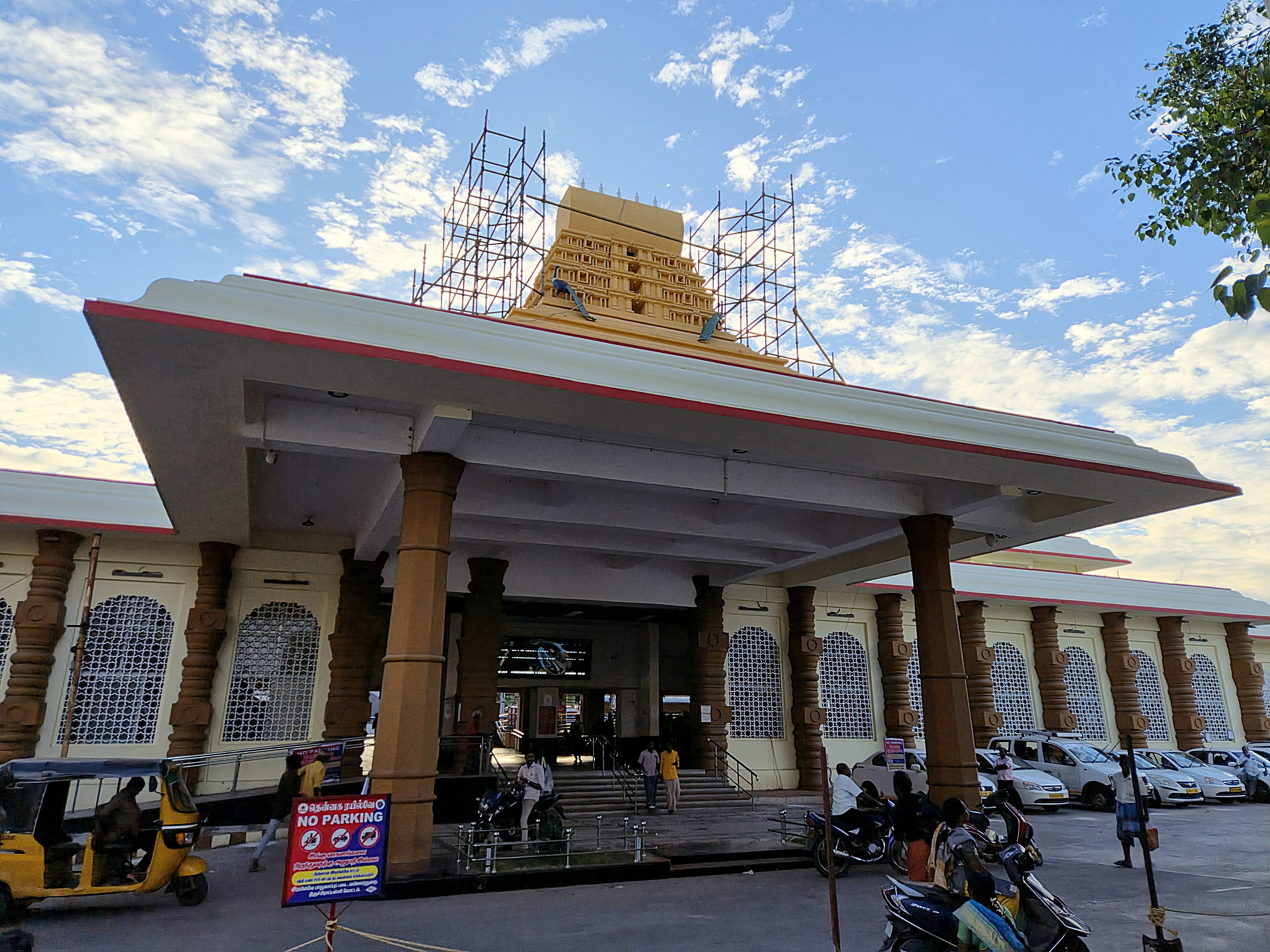
- Mayiladuthurai Junction

General information
- Other names: Mayuram Junction
- Location: Railway Cross Road, Mayiladuthurai, Mayiladuthurai, Tamil Nadu; India
- Coordinates: 11.0951°N 79.6284°E
- Elevation: 13 metres (43 ft)
- System: Indian Railways station
- Owner: Indian Railways
- Operator: Southern Railway zone
- Line: Chennai Egmore–Thanjavur main line Mayiladuthurai—Karaikudi section Mayiladuthurai—Karaikal section via Peralam Mayiladuthurai—Tharangambadi(non-functional)
- Platforms: 5
- Tracks: 8
- Connections: Bus stand, Taxicab stand, Auto rickshaw stand

Construction
- Structure type: At-grade
- Parking: Yes
- Accessible: Disabled access

Other information
- Status: Functioning
- Station code: MV
- Zone(s): Southern Railway
- Division(s): Tiruchirapalli

History
- Opened: 15 February 1877; 149 years ago
- Electrified: 28 January 2020
Route map
Location
- Location within Tamil Nadu

Mayiladuthurai Junction (station code: MV), formerly known as Mayavaram Junction, is a railway station located in Mayiladuthurai, in Tamil Nadu, India. It is a part of the Southern Railway zone of Indian Railways and is administered by Tiruchirappalli railway division. The station is classified as an NSG–3 category station and has five platforms. It handles a combination of originating, terminating, and passing trains, with 14 originating and 14 terminating trains, and approximately 74 departure and arrival trains operating daily.

== Overview ==
Mayiladuthurai Junction is located on the Chennai Egmore–Thanjavur main line, a route connecting Chennai to the Cauvery delta region. The station serves as an important node in regional rail transportation, supporting both passenger and freight movement across Tamil Nadu.

Historically, the station formed part of the South Indian Railway network. The South Indian Railway was a metre-gauge (3 ft 3 in), single-track system with a total route length of approximately 1,221 mi (1,965 km), including the worked lines. The rail line originated from Madras Beach (now Chennai Beach) to Tuticorin (now Thoothukudi), a distance of about 446 mi (718 km), serving important towns such as Chingleput (Chengalpattu), Cuddalore, Mayavaram (now Mayiladuthurai), Kumbakonam, Tanjore (Thanjavur), Trichinopoly (Tiruchirappalli), Dindigul, and Madura (Madurai).

At Mayavaram, a branch line about 54 mi (87 km) in length extended to Mutupet (Muthupet) through Peralam. From Peralam on this branch, a shorter line of around 15 miles connected to the French-administered port of Karaikkal. In April 1894, the Mayavaram–Mutupet Railway, owned by the Tanjore District Board, was opened for traffic and later operated by the South Indian Railway Company. The Muthupet–Aranthangi line was opened for traffic in 1903, followed by the opening of the Aranthangi–Karaikkudi line in 1952, providing Mayavaram Junction with direct access to Karaikkudi.

== History ==
The Junction was established on 15 February 1877 as part of the Chennai Egmore–Thanjavur main line, constructed by the South Indian Railway Company. In April 1894 it became a junction with the addition of branch lines, including the Mayiladuthurai–Karaikudi section via Mutupet, Thiruthuraipoondi, Pattukkottai, and Aranthangi.

In 1880, the South Indian Railway Company completed a 446 mi (718 km) metre-gauge trunk line from Chennai to Tuticorin via Cuddalore, Chidambaram, Mayiladuthurai, Kumbakonam, and Thanjavur.

Before 1880, several sections of the main line through Mayavaram had already been opened. These included the Tindivanam–Cuddalore Junction (82.67 km), Cuddalore Junction–Porto Novo (Parangipettai) (27.60 km), Sirkazhi (Shiyali)–Mayavaram (19.71 km), and Mayavaram–Thanjavur (70.42 km) sections in 1877, followed by the Coleroon (Kollidam)–Sirkazhi (9.75 km) and Porto Novo–Chidambaram (10.83 km) sections in 1878.

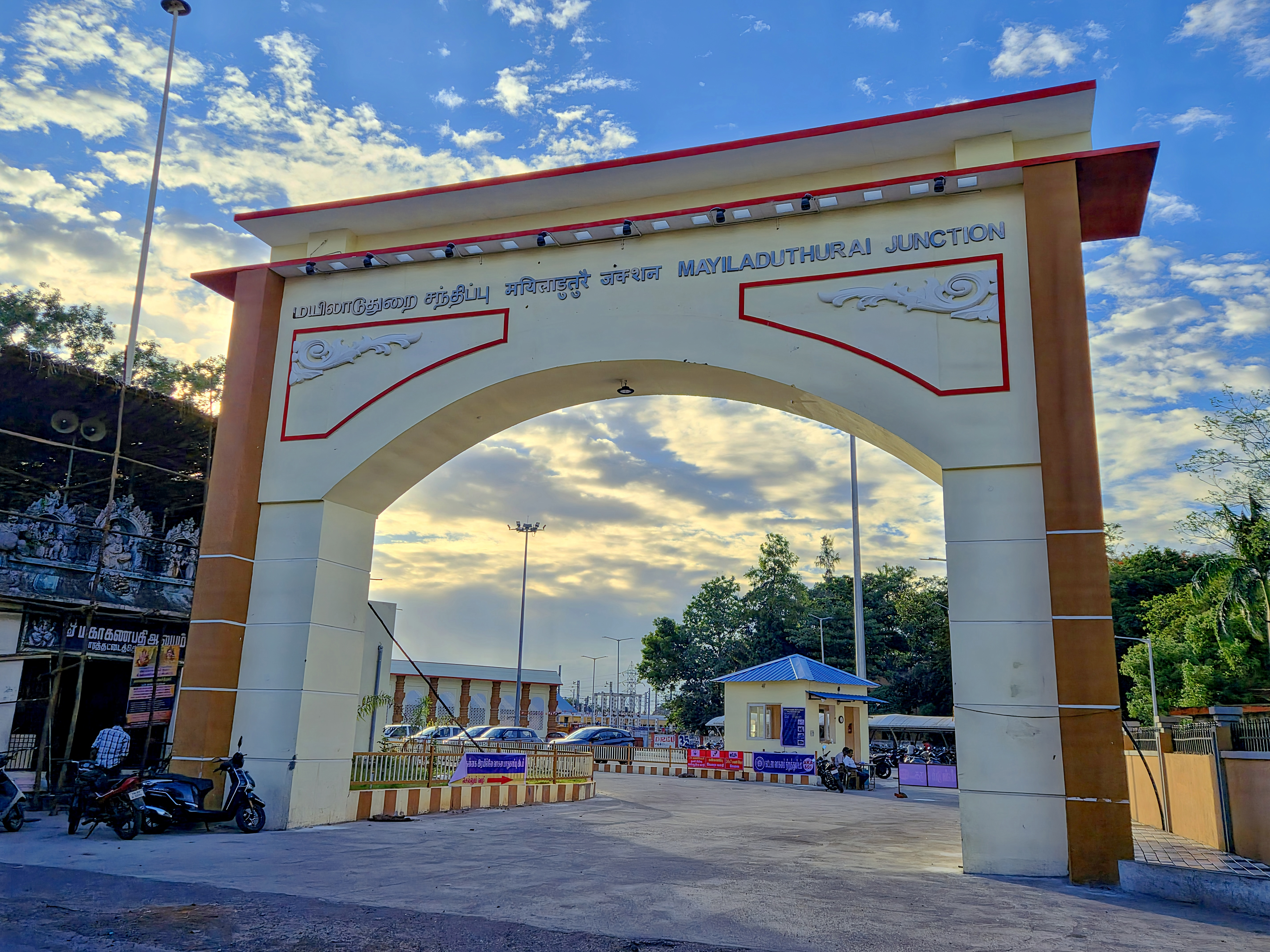
Secondary Arch

A 36 km (22 mi) metre-gauge line from Mayiladuthurai–Tharangambadi (then known as Tranquebar) was opened in 1926 by the British administration. This line was closed in 1987 due to operational challenges, though proposals for restoration have been discussed in recent years.

== Lines ==
Mayiladuthurai Junction connects to multiple destinations via the following lines:

1. Broad gauge (BG) single line to Chennai Egmore via Cuddalore Port Junction, Viluppuram Junction, Chengalpattu Junction and Tambaram (electrified).
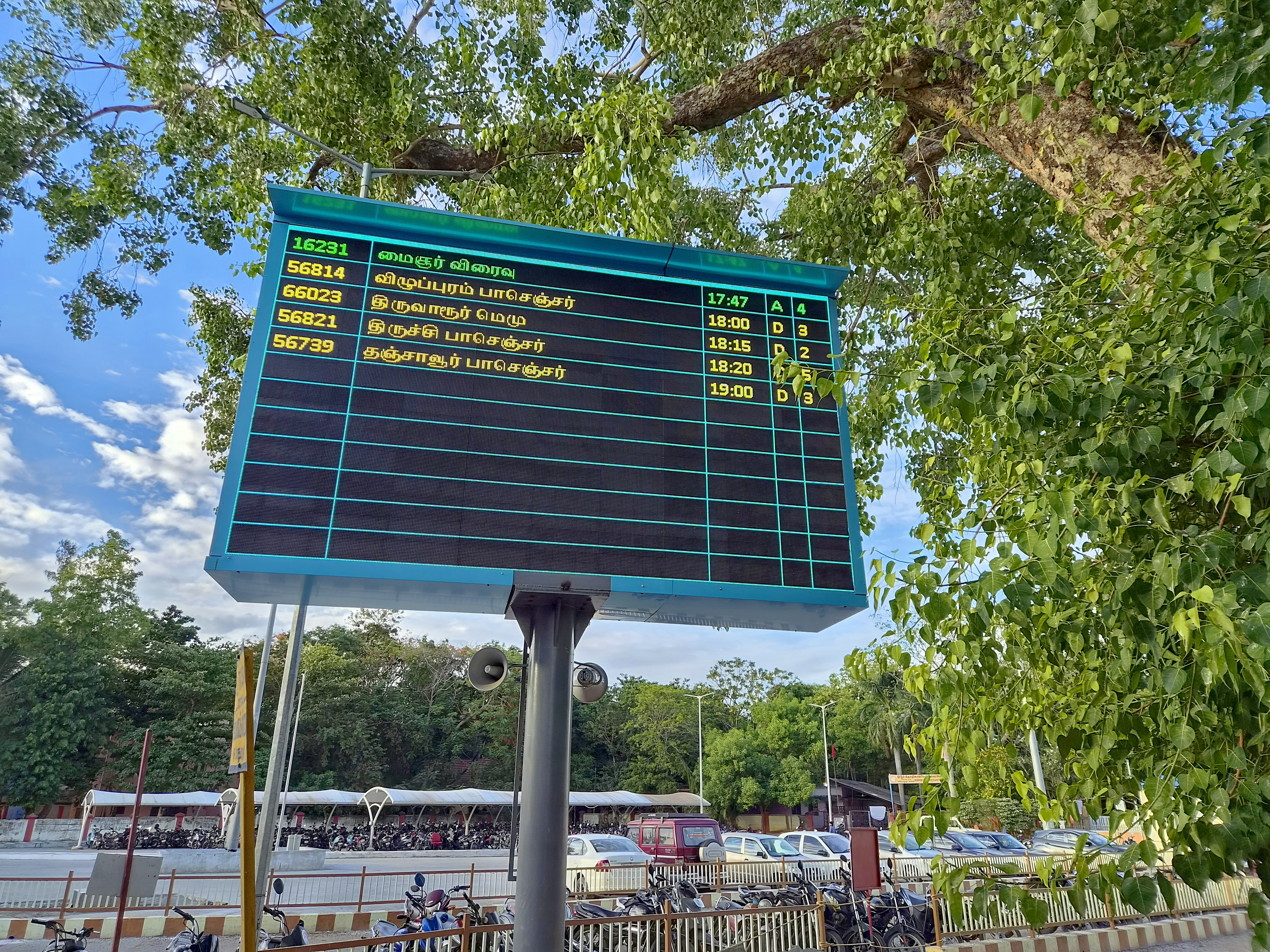
2. Electronic Sign board
  BG single line to Thanjavur Junction (electrified).
3. BG single line to Karaikkudi Junction via Thiruvarur Junction and Peralam Junction (electrified up to Thiruvarur).
4. BG single line to Karaikal railway station via Peralam Junction (electrified).
5. Non-functional metre-gauge (MG) line to Tharangambadi.

== Network and services ==
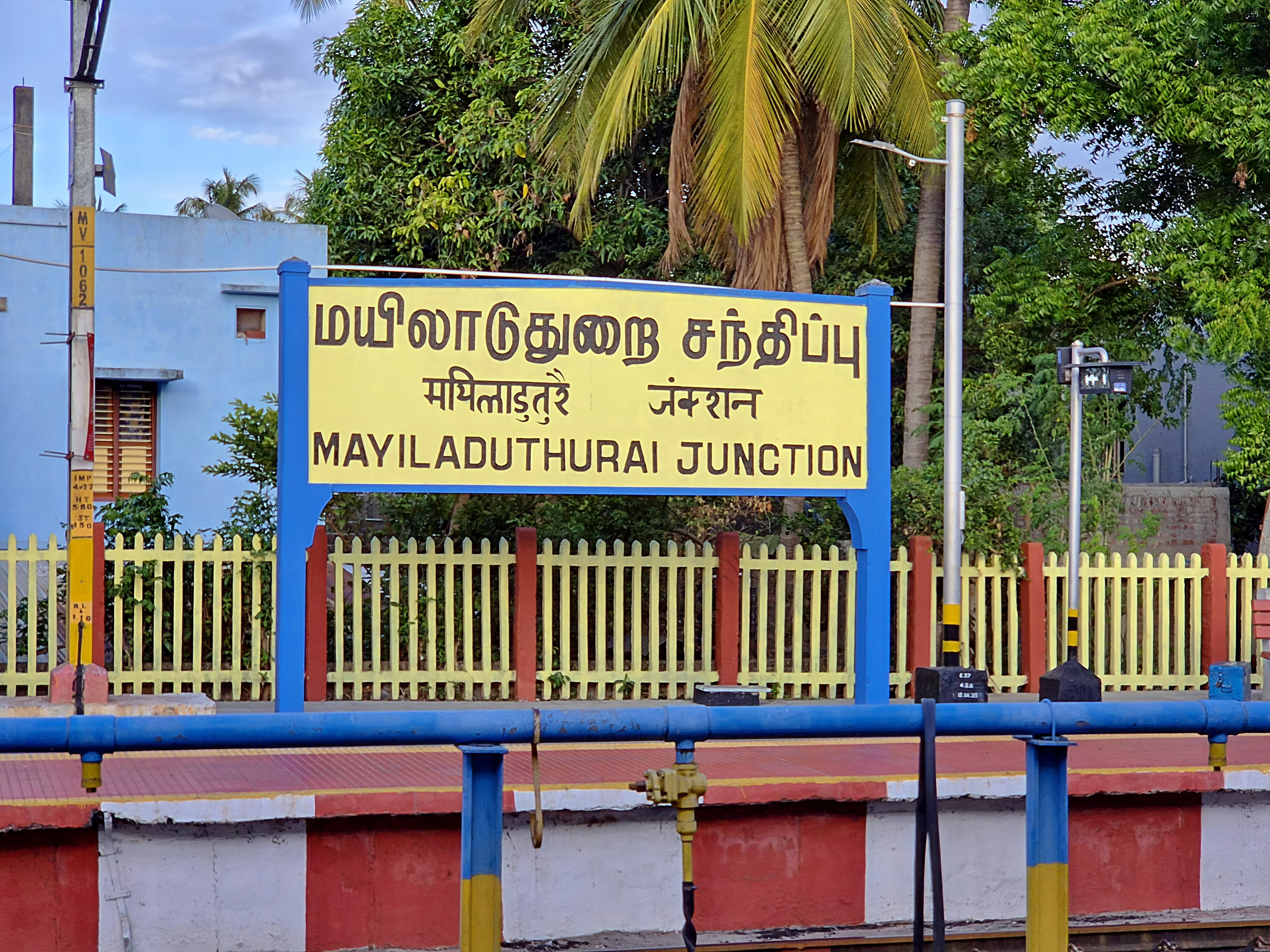
Junction Sign Board

The station is classified as a NSG–3 category station and comes under the purview of the Tiruchirappalli railway division of the Southern Railway zone of the Indian Railways. It is located on the Chennai Egmore–Thanjavur main line , with a branch line connecting to Thiruvarur and Karaikal via Peralam Junction. As of 2026, the station handles 74 trains, including those that halt, originate and terminate at the station. Service comprises Mail/Express, Antyodaya trains and Suburban/Multiple Units daily.

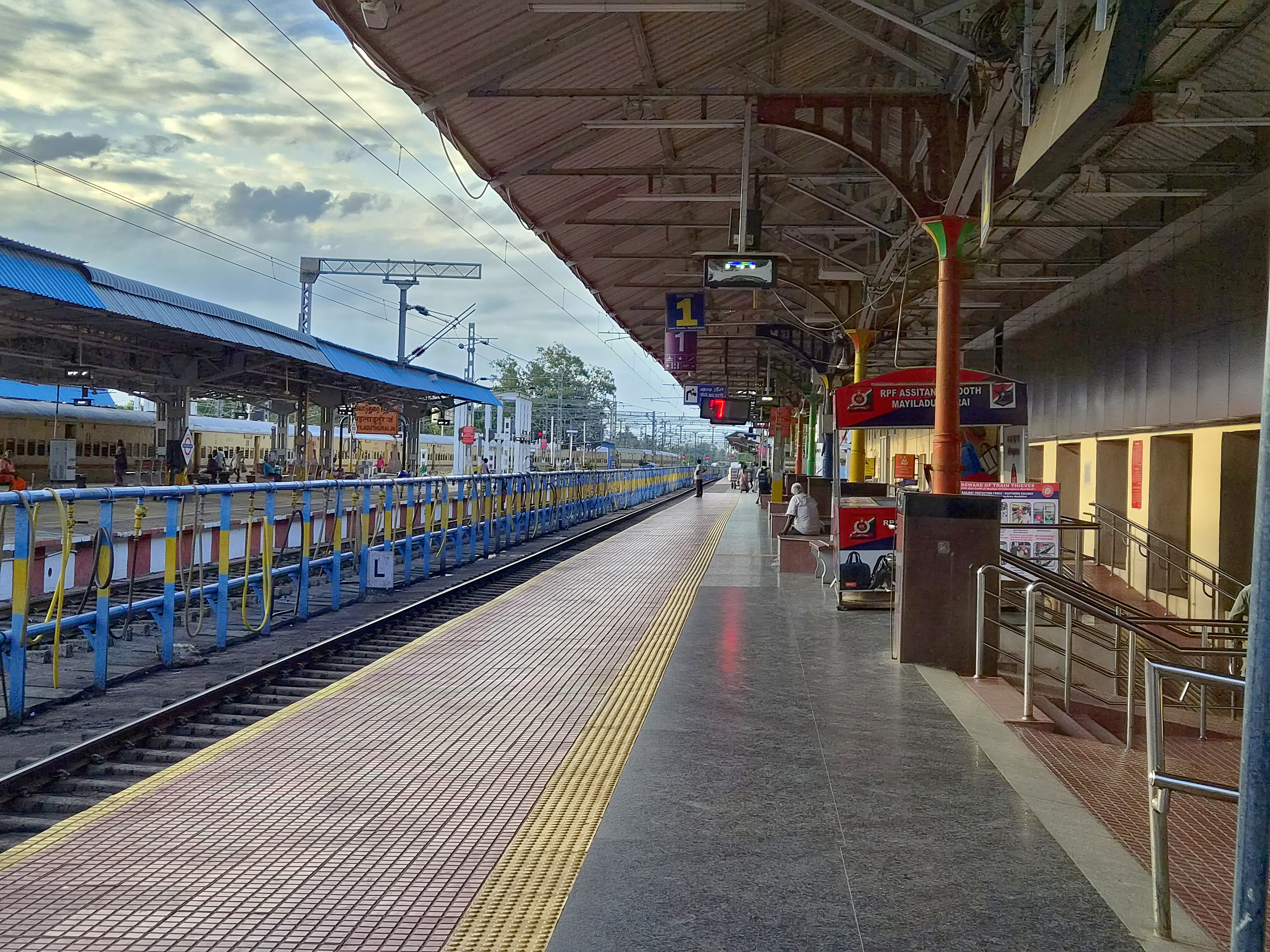
Platform No 1 view

The station provides daily train services to Chennai, Coimbatore, Madurai, Bengaluru, Mysore, Nagercoil, Rameswaram, Sengottai, Tiruchendur, and Tirupati. In addition, the station is linked to weekly services to longer-distance destinations such as Ayodhya, Bhagat Ki Kothi, Bhubaneswar, Hyderabad, Kanniyakumari, Mumbai, New Jalpaiguri, and Thoothukudi, Varanasi (Banaras) thereby extending its reach to northern, eastern, and western parts of the country.

The station has direct daily services to destinations including Villupuram, Thiruvarur, Salem, Thanjavur, Tiruchirappalli, Mannargudi, Karaikal, Karaikkudi, and Velankanni. Services comprise passenger, Express, MEMU, and DEMU trains.

The station also manages freight operations across southern India, including the transportation of commodities such as paddy, coal, and fertilizers.

== Facilities ==
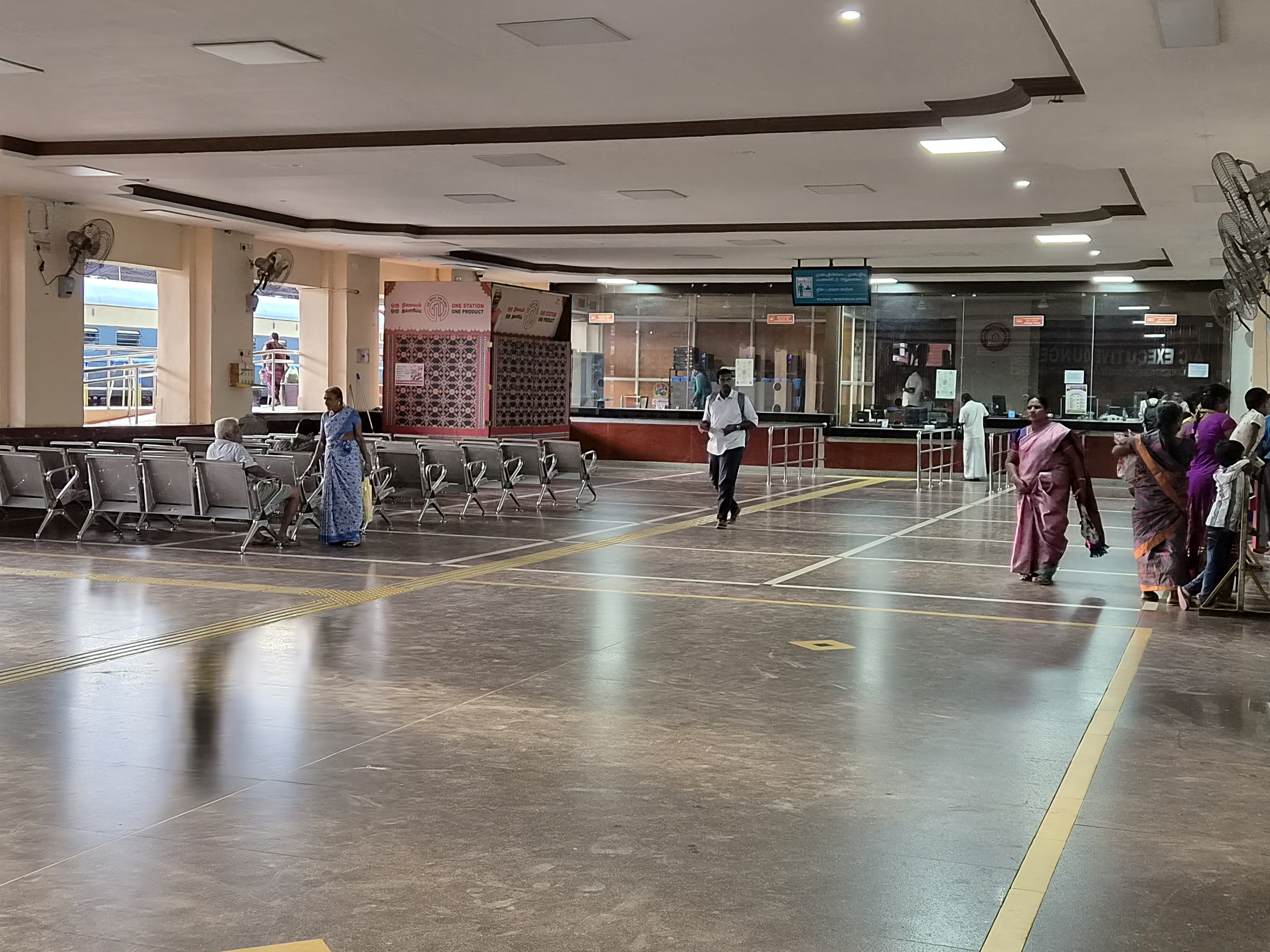
Main Concourse

The station has a total of 8 platforms, including 5 designated for passenger movement and 3 for freight operations. Passenger amenities include dormitories, retiring rooms, waiting halls, CCTV surveillance, Wi-Fi connectivity, Railway Mail Services, restaurants, ATMs, and battery-operated cars for mobility assistance.

Upgradation and beautification works are being carried out under the Amrit Bharat Station Scheme, with completion expected by mid-2026. The project includes the installation of elevators and escalators, along with other infrastructure improvements.

== Gauge conversion ==
Meter-gauge 1,000 mm (3.3 ft), train services on the Thanjavur–Mayiladuthurai–Villupuram route were suspended in phases for broad gauge 1,676 mm (5.499 ft), conversion project. The operations on the Thanjavur–Kumbakonam–Mayiladuthurai section were discontinued between 2004–2005. Subsequently, the Villupuram–Mayiladuthurai section was closed to regular passenger traffic from around 2007–2008 onward for gauge conversion.

The broad-gauge conversion of the Thanjavur to Mayiladuthurai 70 kilometres (43 mi) was completed and the line was reopened in 2006. The Villupuram to Mayiladuthurai 122 kilometres (76 mi) was inaugurated on 10 May 2010. The Mayiladuthurai to Tiruvarur 38 kilometres (24 mi) was opened on 16 December 2011. Further, the conversion of the Tiruvarur–Karaikudi section was completed in 2019.

== Electrification ==
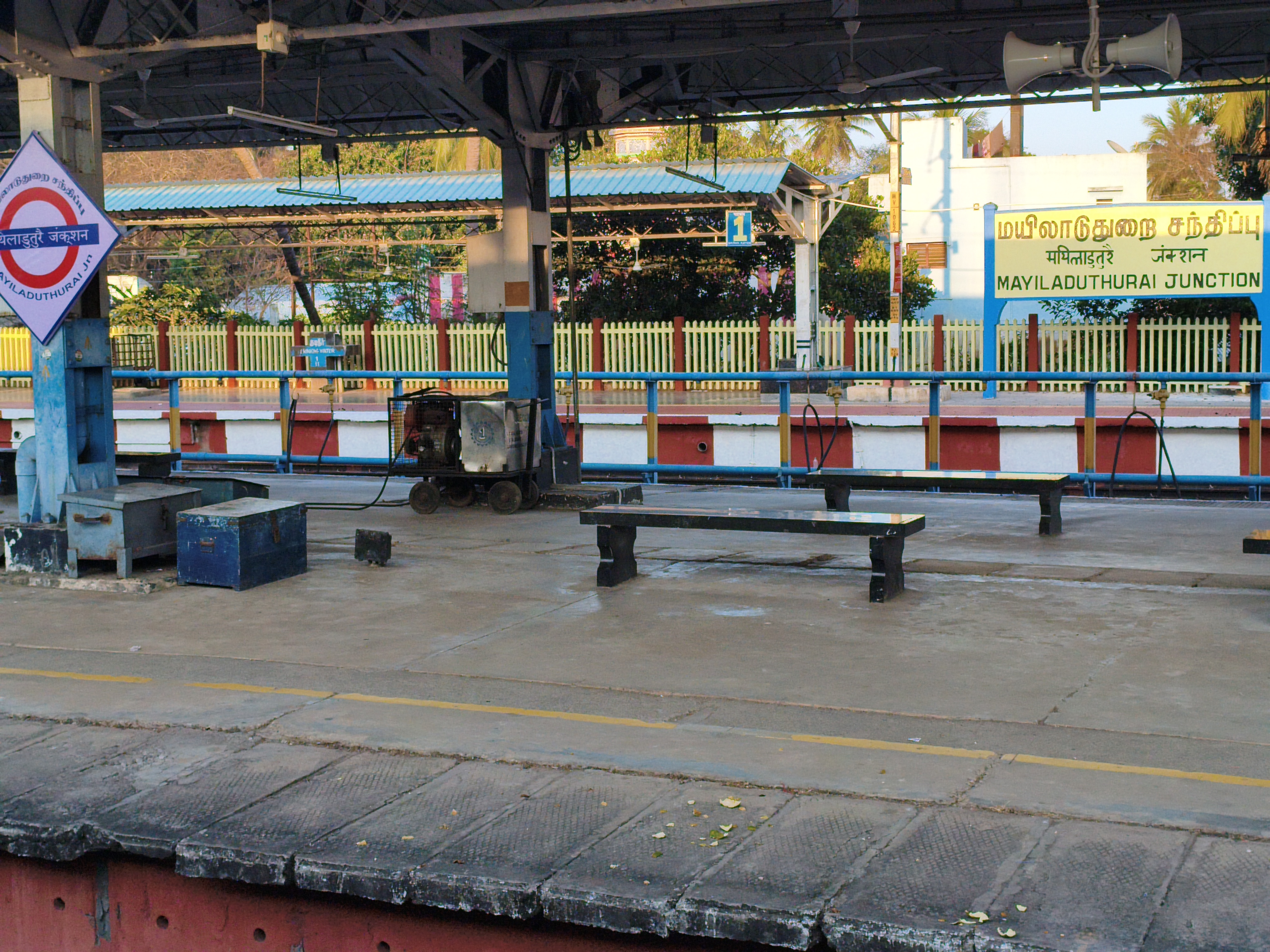
Mayiladuthurai Junction

The Cuddalore-Mayiladuthurai-Thiruvarur section 113 kilometres (70 mi) was commissioned on 28 January 2020.

The Mayiladuthurai-Thanjavur section 70 kilometres (43 mi) was completed in the end of 2020 and it was commissioned on 14 February 2021.

== Location and layout ==
The railway station is located off the Sarathattai Street, Railway Cross Road south-west of Mayiladuthurai. The nearest bus depot is located in Mayiladuthurai while the nearest airport is situated 138 kilometres (86 mi) away in Tiruchirappalli.

== Projects and development ==
It is one of the 77 stations in Tamil Nadu to be named for upgradation under Amrit Bharat Station Scheme of Indian Railways.

== Gallery ==
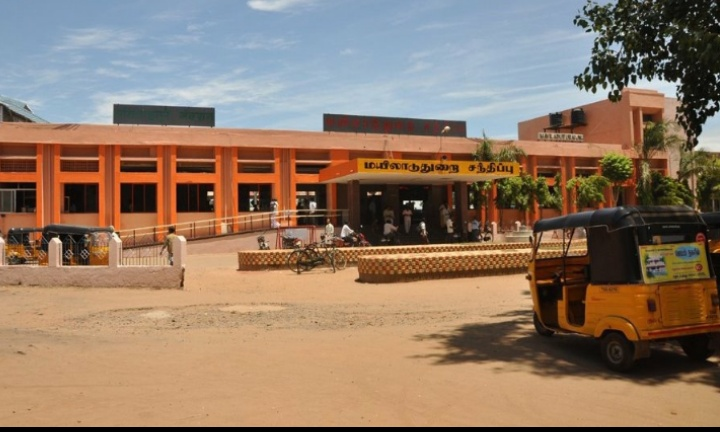
Mayiladuthurai Junction year 2018

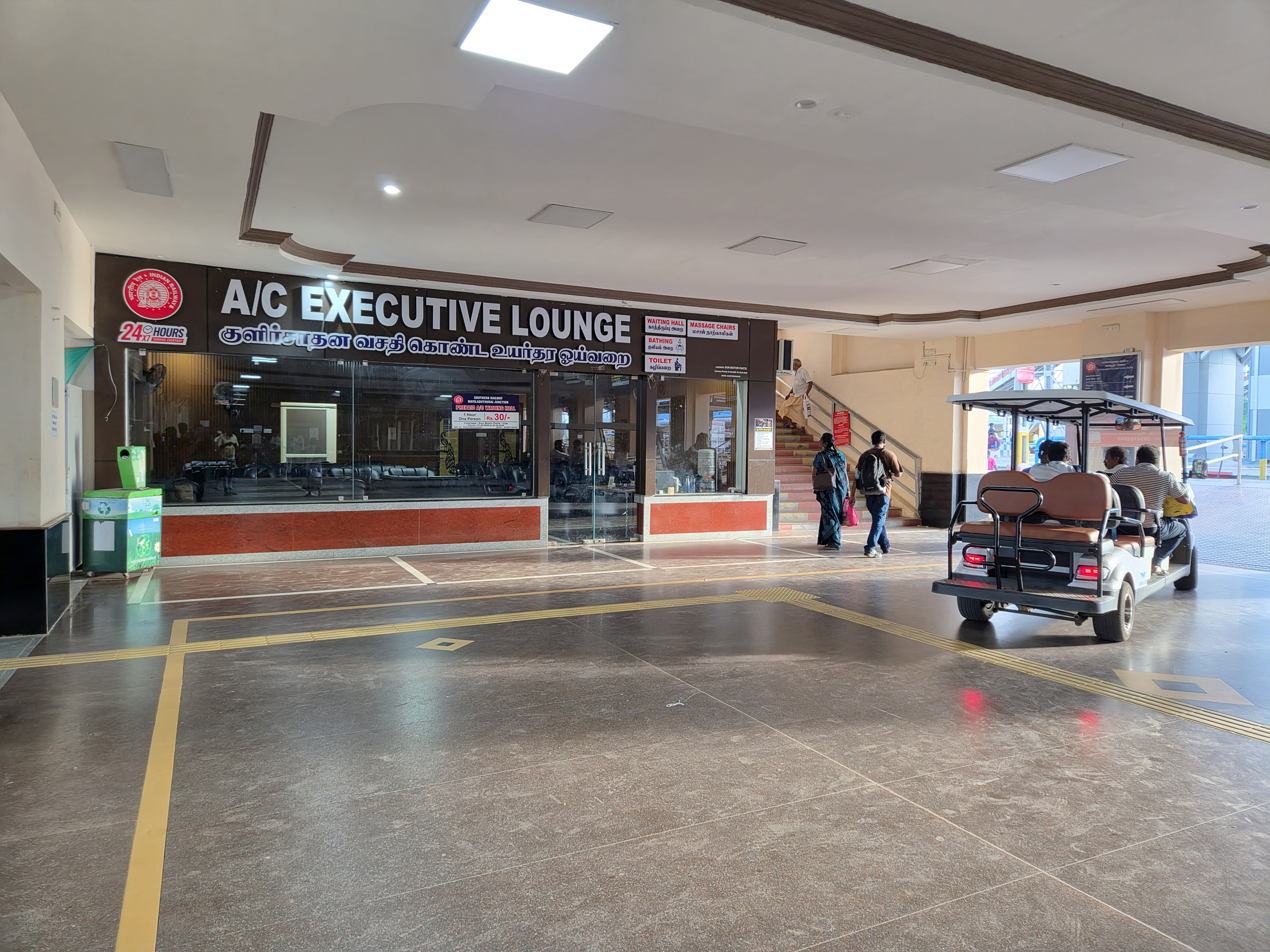
AC Waiting Hall

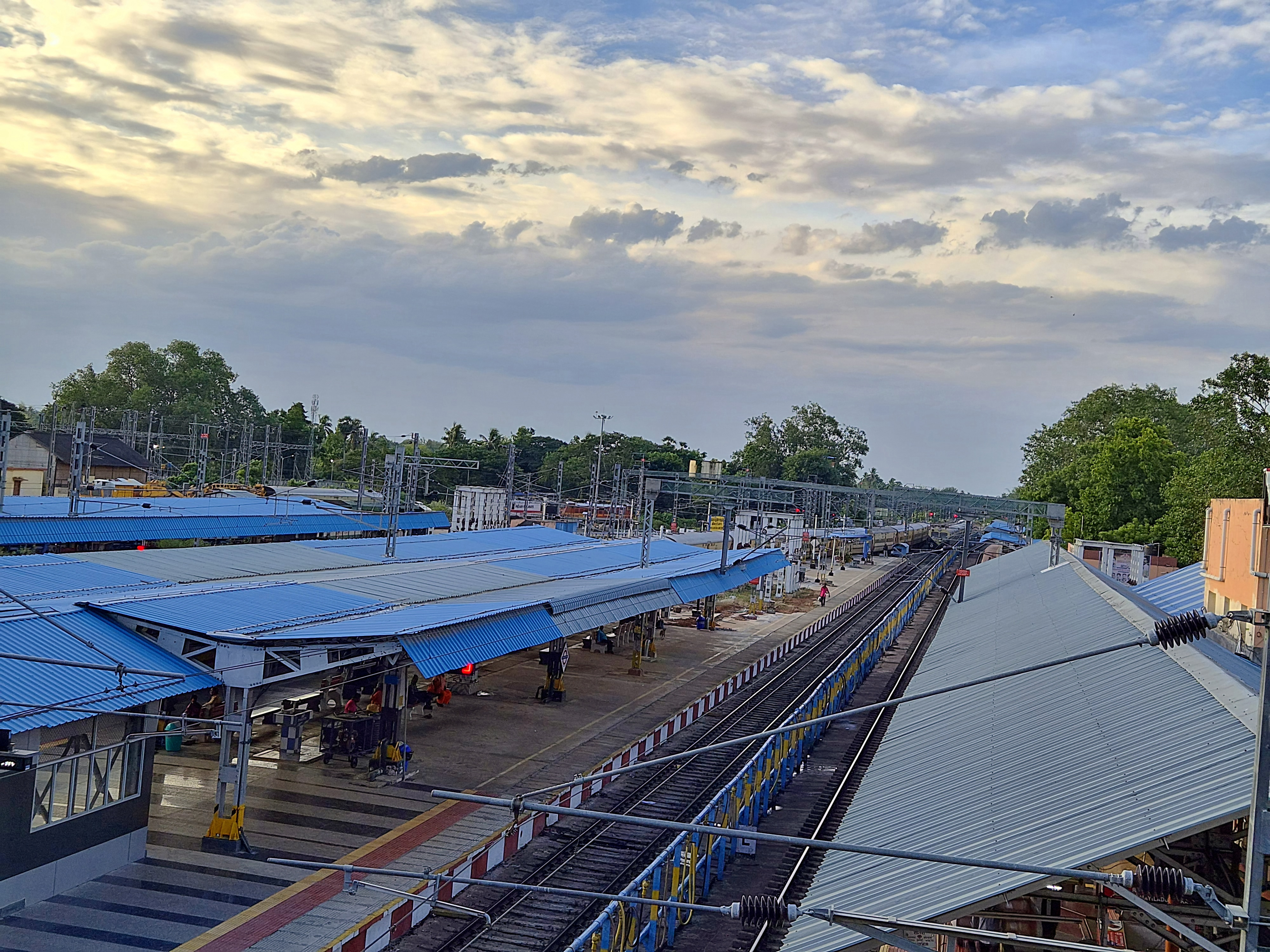
Planform view

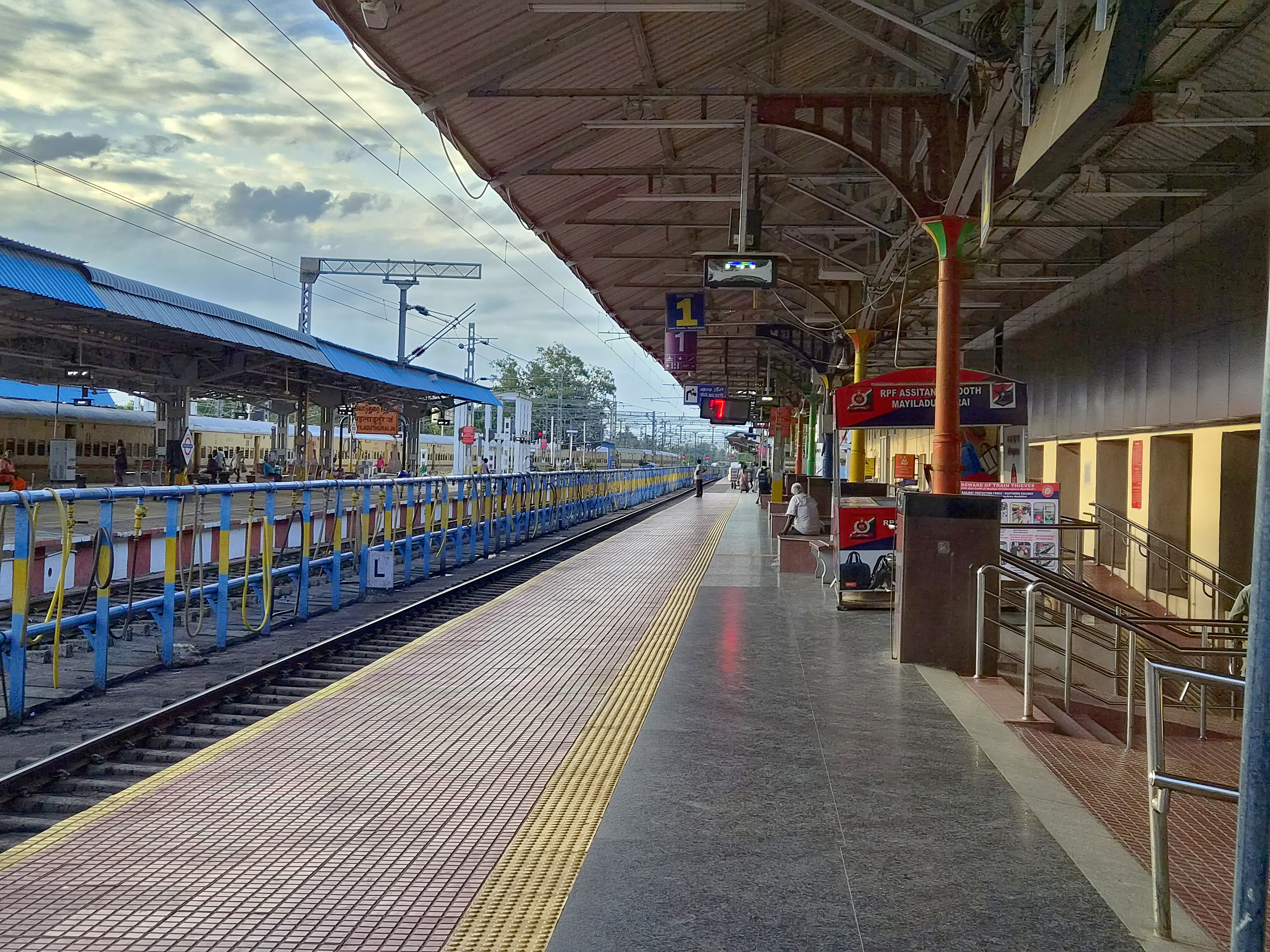
Platform 1

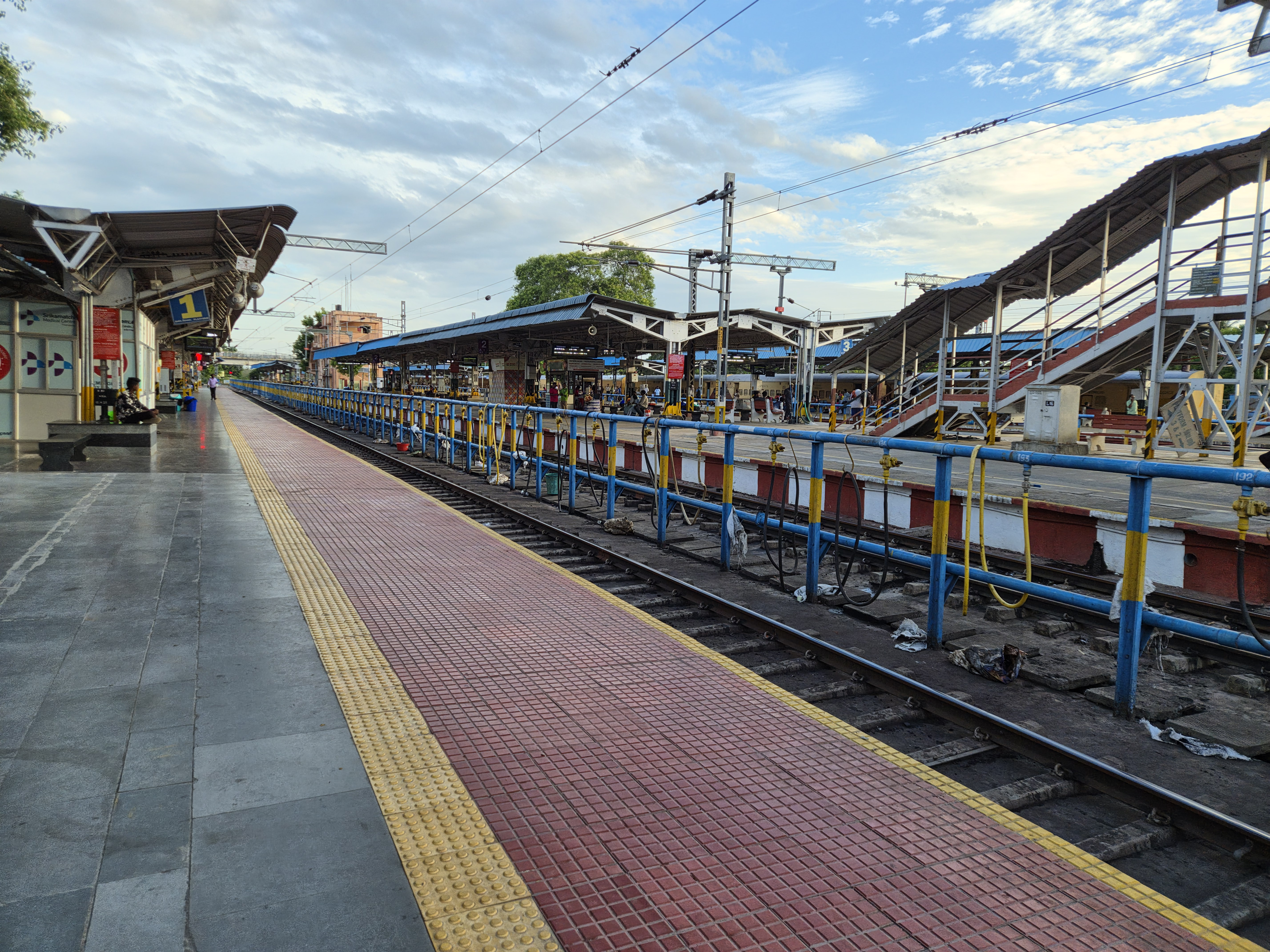
Platform 1
