= Puducherry railway station =

Railway station in Pondicherry, India

Puducherry Pondicherry
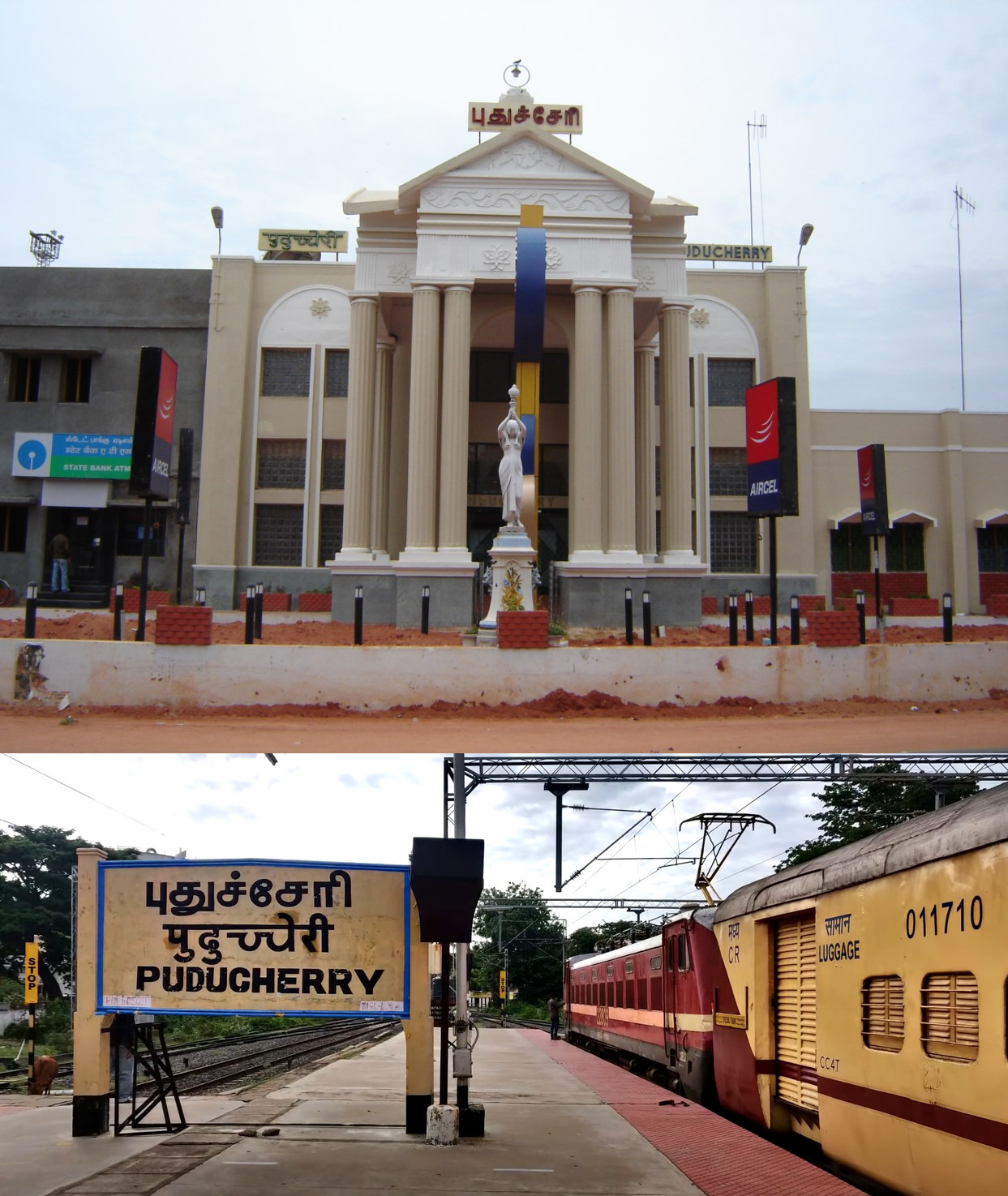
- The Main Entrance of the Station; Puducherry Railway Platform with Arakkonam WAP4 #22809 holding Dadar - Pondy Express

General information
- Other names: Pondy
- Location: Subbiah Salai (South Blvd), Pondicherry; India
- Coordinates: 11.9250°N 79.8281°E
- System: Indian Railways station
- Owner: Indian Railways
- Operator: Southern Railway zone
- Line: Villupuram–Pondicherry branch line
- Platforms: 4 + 1(Goods Terminal)
- Tracks: 5
- Train operators: Indian Railways
- Connections: Taxi stand, Auto rickshaw stand

Construction
- Structure type: Standard (on-ground station)
- Depth: 590 ft (180 m)
- Platform levels: 1
- Parking: Available
- Cycle facilities: Available
- Accessible: Disabled access

Other information
- Status: Functioning
- Station code: PDY
- Zone(s): Southern Railway zone
- Fare zone: Indian Railways

History
- Opened: 1879
- Closed: 2022
- Rebuilt: 2025 ( Work Progressing)
- Former names: Pondicherry Railway Station

Passengers
- 1,50,00: 80,0000

Services
10
Route map
Location

Puducherry railway station (station code: PDY) is an NSG–4 category Indian railway station in Tiruchirappalli railway division of Southern Railway zone. It is a railway terminus of the Villupuram–Pondicherry branch line serving the city of Pondicherry, headquarter of Puducherry Union territory

== History ==
The Puducherry railway line is one of the oldest rail link in India and it was constructed in the year 1879 by the Puducherry Railway Company during the period of French and British rule in India. Under the supervision of South Indian Railway with the object of connecting the town and the port of Puducherry with South India and to develop the resources of the Puducherry Territory, the rail link between Puducherry and Villupuram has been established. Even though there was total enmity between the then Super Powers—the French and the English—when it came to economic development they had a very good understanding and the Puducherry Railway system was a good example of it.

The station is operated by the Southern Railway zone of the Indian Railways and comes under the Tiruchirapalli railway division. This Division may be the only Division in the world maintaining the Railways developed by both the British and the French empires.

It has daily trains connecting the city with Chennai, villuppuram and Tirupathi apart from non-daily trains towards prime cities including Mangaluru, kanyakumari, Bengaluru, Kolkata, New Delhi, Bhubaneshwar and Mumbai via Villupuram.

== Location and layout ==
The Puducherry railway station is located on Subbiah Salai and is very close to several tourist spots and important locations in the city such as the Main Bus Stand (1.3 km (0.81 mi)), Aurobindo Ashram (1.8 km (1.1 mi)), Chief Secretariat Building (1.9 km (1.2 mi)), and Puducherry Airport (6.8 km (4.2 mi)).

There are 4 platforms in the station for passenger traffic and one for the goods service which is sandwiched between platform 1. There have also been proposals for constructing 2 pit lanes in the station for train maintenance. The station underwent a major revamp in 2008 following the launch of new trains connecting it to various destinations. currently all the rakes of trains which are operated from this station are being maintained in villupuram junction railway station
