= National Highway 332 (India) =

National Highway in India

National Highway 332
- Map of National Highway 332 in red
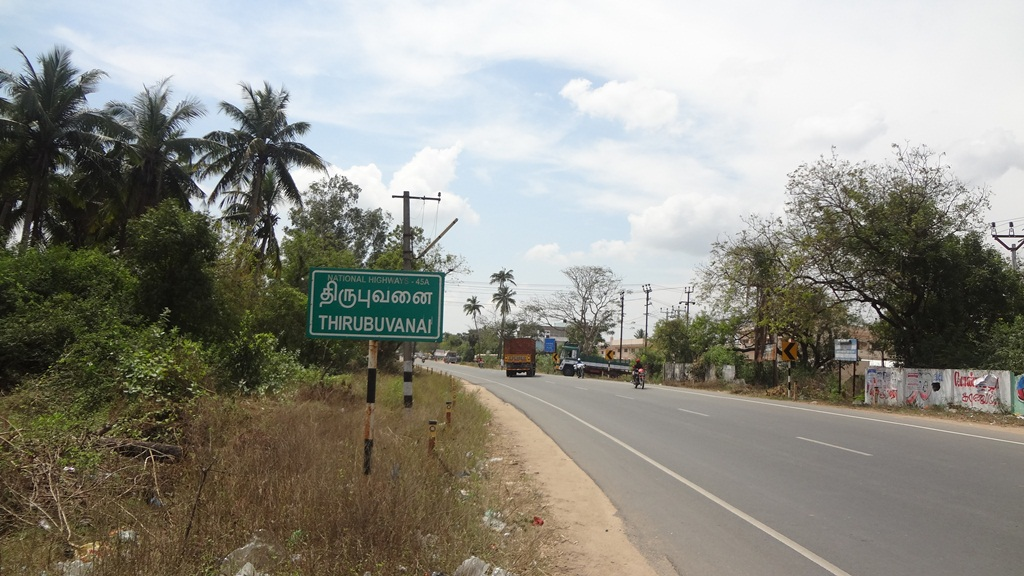

Route information
- Auxiliary route of NH 32
- Length: 38 km (24 mi)

Major junctions
- East end: Puducherry city
- West end: Viluppuram

Location
- Country: India
- States: Tamil Nadu, Puducherry U.T.

Highway system
- Roads in India; Expressways; National; State; Asian
← NH 32	→ NH 38

National Highway 332 (NH 332) is a national highway in India. It is a secondary route of National Highway 32. NH-332 runs in the state of Tamil Nadu and Puducherry U.T. in India.

National Highway 45A was renamed National Highway 332.

== Route ==
NH332 connects Puducherry city in the union territory of Puducherry with Viluppuram in the state of Tamil Nadu.

== Junctions ==
NH 32 Terminal near Pondicherry.
NH 38 Terminal near Viluppuram.

== Expansion ==
- On 06 April 2025, Prime Minister Narendra Modi inaugurated and dedicated the 29 km stretch of National Highway 332 from Villupuram to Puducherry, the 56.8 km lengthy four-lane section of NH 32 from Poondiyankuppam to Chattanathapuram.

== See also ==
- List of national highways in India
- List of national highways in India by state
