= Vriddhachalam Junction railway station =

Railway station in Tamil Nadu, India

Vriddhachalam Junction
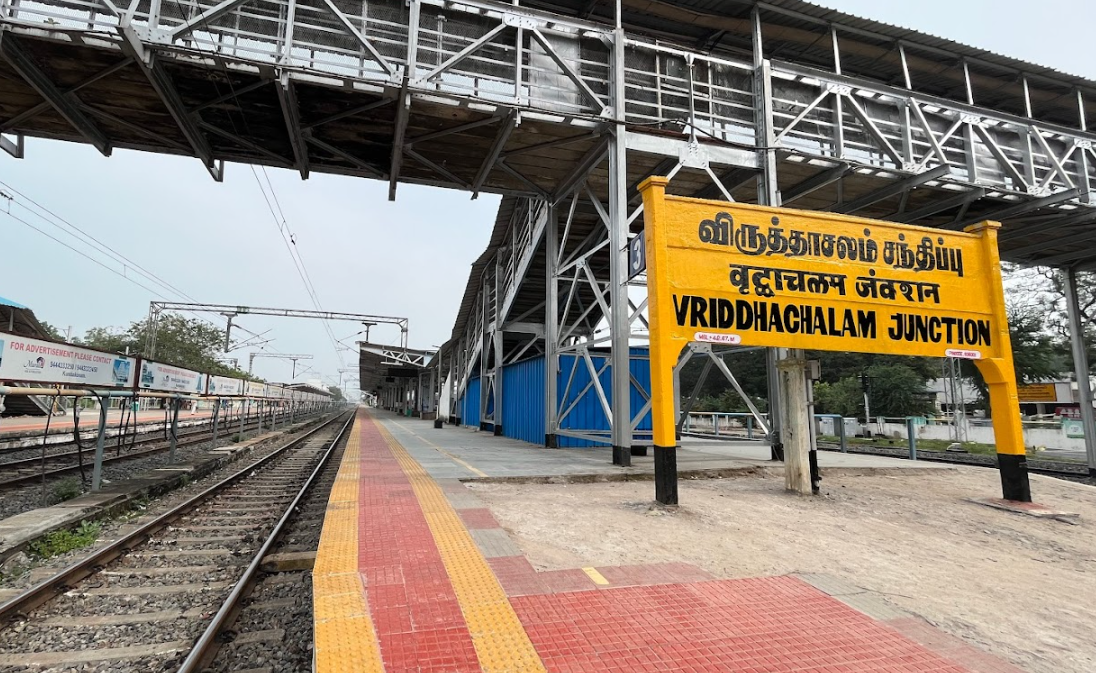
- Virddhachalam railways station platform

General information
- Location: State Highway 69, Vriddhachalam, Tamil Nadu; India
- Coordinates: 11°32′06″N 79°18′58″E
- Elevation: 45 metres (148 ft)
- System: Indian Railways station
- Owner: Indian Railways
- Operator: Southern Railway zone
- Lines: Chord Line, Tamil Nadu; Vriddhachalam–Cuddalore Port branch line Vriddachalam–Salem line
- Platforms: 4

Construction
- Structure type: Standard on ground
- Parking: Yes
- Cycle facilities: No
- Accessible: Disabled access

Other information
- Status: Functioning
- Station code: VRI
- Division(s): Tiruchirappalli

Services
Preceding station	Indian Railways	Following station
Pavanur towards	Southern Railway zone Chennai Egmore–Vriddhachalam section of Chennai–Kanyakumari line	Pennadam towards
Uttangal Mangalam towards	Southern Railway zone Cuddalore Port–Vriddhachalam branch line	Terminus
Mukhasaparur towards	Southern Railway zone Salem–Vriddhachalam line	Terminus
Route map
Location
- Location within Tamil Nadu Location within India

Vriddhachalam Junction railway station (station code: VRI) is an NSG–4 category Indian railway station in Tiruchirappalli railway division of Southern Railway zone. It is located in Cuddalore district in the Indian state of Tamil Nadu and serves Virudhachalam.

== History ==
The South Indian Railway Company laid a 715 km (444 mi)-long metre-gauge trunk line from Chennai to Tuticorin in 1880.

With the conversion from metre gauge to broad gauge in the entire Egmore–Tambaram–Villupuram–Tiruchirapalli–Dindigul–Madurai sector virtually complete broad-gauge passenger traffic was initiated in March 2001.

== Projects and development ==
The broad-gauge Viluppuram–Tiruchirapalli sector was electrified in 2010. It is one of the 73 stations in Tamil Nadu to be named for upgradation under Amrit Bharat Station Scheme of Indian Railways.
