= Villupuram Junction railway station =

Railway station in Tamil Nadu

Villuppuram Junction
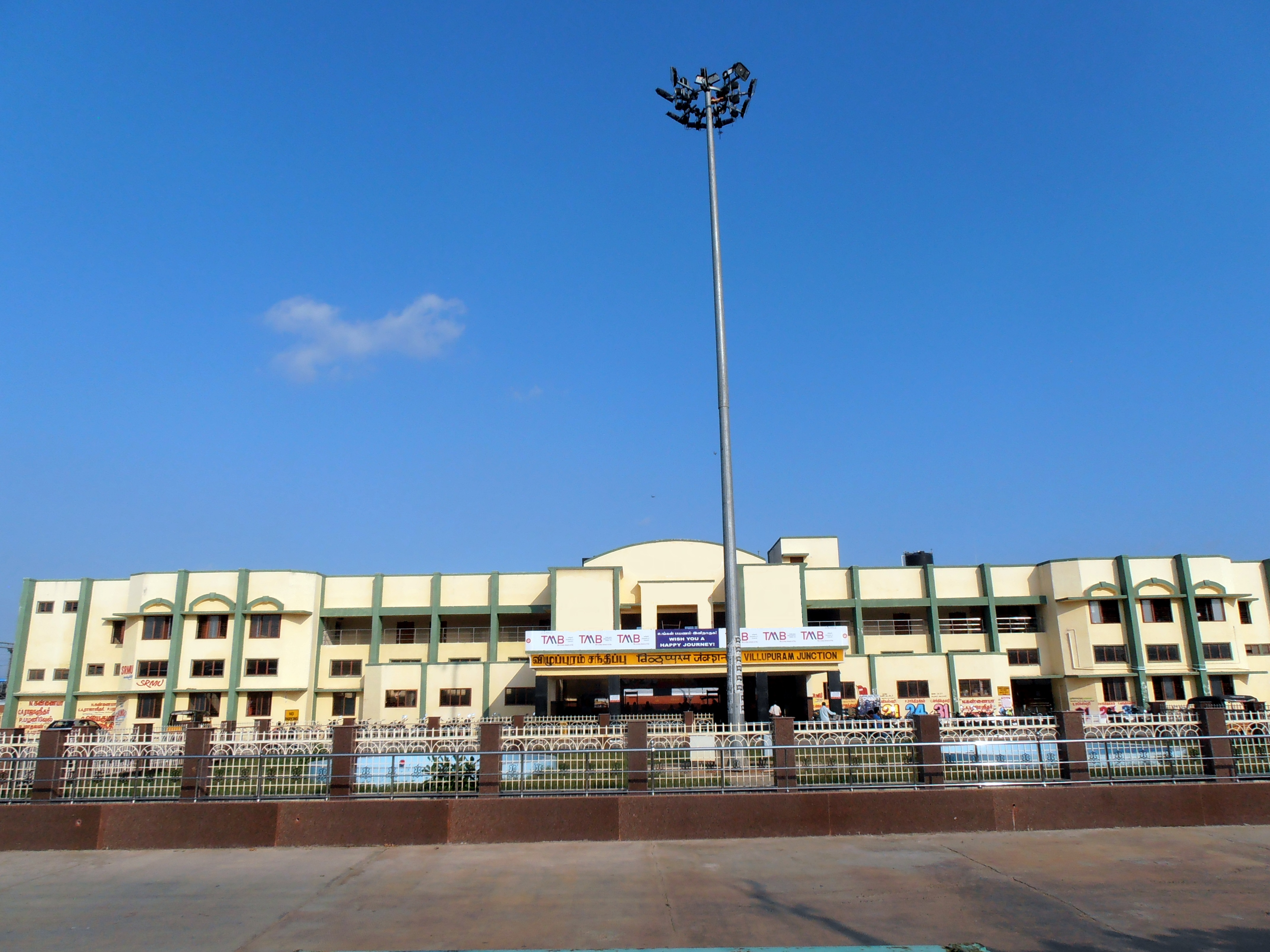
- Viluppuram Railway

General information
- Location: East Pondy Road, Keelperumpakkam, Viluppuram, Viluppuram district, Tamil Nadu; India
- Coordinates: 11.9426°N 79.4997°E
- Elevation: 44 metres (144 ft)
- System: Indian Railways station
- Owner: Indian Railways
- Operator: Southern Railway zone
- Lines: Chennai Beach–Kumbakonam–Thanjavur main line Viluppuram–Trichy Chord Line; Viluppuram–Pondicherry branch line Viluppuram–Katpadi branch line
- Platforms: 7
- Tracks: 14
- Connections: Auto rickshaw, Taxi, Bus

Construction
- Structure type: Standard (on ground station)
- Parking: Yes
- Accessible: Disabled access

Other information
- Status: Functioning
- Station code: VM
- Zone(s): Southern Railway

History
- Opened: 1879; 147 years ago
- Rebuilt: 2011; 15 years ago
- Electrified: 25 kV AC 50 Hz
Location
- Location within Tamil Nadu Location within India

Villupuram Junction (station code: VM) is an NSG–3 category Indian railway station in Tiruchirappalli railway division of Southern Railway zone. It is a railway station in Viluppuram, Tamil Nadu. Being a prominent railway station, it serves as the distribution point of rail traffic from Chennai, the state capital of Tamil Nadu, towards the southern and central parts of the state. It is the third largest junction by number of branch lines in the state of Tamil Nadu after Salem junction, Tiruchchirapalli Junction.

== Location and layout ==
Villupuram railway station covers about 20 acres of a vast area, six platforms – Platforms 1 to 3 occupy a length of 600 metres (2,000 ft) and platforms 4 to 6 occupy a length of 550 metres each and few goods/freight train lines which occupies 650 metres (2,130 ft) each and there are few shunting lines. The Railway lines can be crossed with the help of a mass structured over bridge. The railway station is located off the East Pondy Road in the Keelperumpakkam neighborhood. The station is located in close proximity of 3 km (1.9 mi) from the arterial GST Road. Several landmark places such as Railway mixed high school, Aringar Anna Science & Arts College, Municipal Ground, Government Hospital Building, and TNEB Block are located at close proximity from the station.

The Villupuram Old Bus Stand (Town bus stand) is situated at 2 km (1.2 mi) and New bus stand (Central bus stand) is situated at 4 km (2.5 mi) from the Villupuram Junction railway station. The nearest airport is the Puducherry Airport located at a distance of over 40 km (25 mi) and Chennai Airport is 143 km (89 mi) away from Villupuram.

=== Lines ===
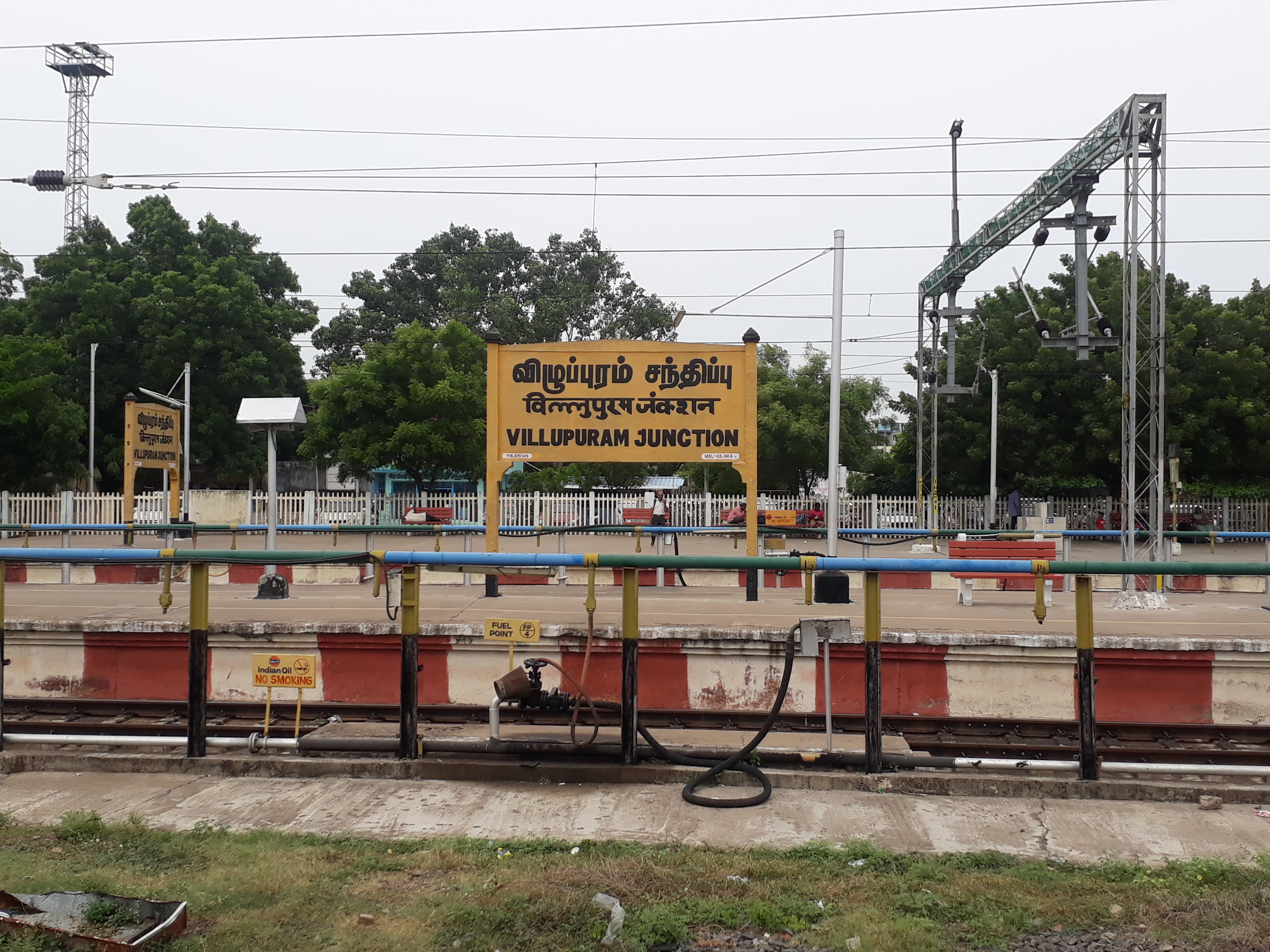
Viluppuram railway station platform

Five railway lines branch out of the Villupuram Junction railway station.

- Double electrified BG (broad-gauge) line towards Chennai Beach via Chengalpattu Junction.
- Double electrified BG (broad-gauge) line towards Tiruchchirapalli Junction via Virudhachalam Junction and Ariyalur. Electrification work was completed in 2009. Also called "Chord Line" to Tiruchirapalli.
- Single electrified BG (broad-gauge) line towards Tiruchirapalli Junction via Cuddalore Port Junction, Mayiladuthurai Junction, Kumbakonam and Thanjavur Junction. Also called as main line
- Single electrified BG (broad-gauge) line towards Katpadi Junction via Tiruvannamalai and Vellore Cantonment.
- Single electrified BG (broad-gauge) line to Puducherry.

Gauge conversion was underway in 2010, making rail traffic even heavier. Villupuram Junction has been undergone a massive infrastructure upgrade to handle this traffic.

== Railway lines ==
Line no.	Towards
1	Virudhachalam Junction (South West)
2	Cuddalore Port Junction (South )
3	Puducherry (East)
4	Chengalpattu Junction (North)
5	Katpadi Junction (West)

== Projects and development ==
It is one of the 73 stations in Tamil Nadu to be named for upgradation under Amrit Bharat Station Scheme of Indian Railways.
