= Ahmedabad–Tiruchchirappalli Weekly Express =

Train in India

Ahmedabad - Tiruchchirappalli Weekly Express

Overview
- Service type: Express
- Status: Active
- Locale: Gujarat, Maharashtra, Karnataka, Telangana, Andhra Pradesh and Tamil Nadu
- First service: 24 September 2026; 15 days' time
- Current operator: Western Railway (WR)

Route
- Termini: Ahmedabad Junction (ADI); Tiruchchirappalli Junction (TPJ)
- Stops: 34
- Distance travelled: 2,124 km (1,320 mi)
- Average journey time: 42h 15m
- Service frequency: Weekly
- Train number: 19419 / 19420

On-board services
- Classes: General Unreserved, Sleeper Class, AC 3rd Class, AC 2nd Class
- Seating arrangements: Yes
- Sleeping arrangements: Yes
- Catering facilities: E-Catering
- Observation facilities: Large windows
- Baggage facilities: No
- Other facilities: Below the seats

Technical
- Rolling stock: ICF coach
- Track gauge: 1,676 mm (5 ft 6 in)
- Electrification: 25 kV 50 Hz AC overhead line
- Operating speed: 130 km/h (81 mph) maximum, 50 km/h (31 mph) average including halts.
- Track owner: Indian Railways

The 19419 / 19420 Ahmedabad–Tiruchchirappalli Weekly Express is an express train belonging to Western Railway zone that runs between the city Ahmedabad Junction of Gujarat and Tiruchchirappalli Junction of Tamil Nadu in India.

It operates as train number 19419 from Ahmedabad Junction to Tiruchchirappalli Junction and as train number 19420 in the reverse direction, serving the states of Gujarat, Maharashtra, Karnataka, Telangana, Andhra Pradesh and Tamil Nadu.

== Services ==
- 19419 / Ahmedabad–Tiruchchirappalli Weekly Express has an average speed of 50 km/h and covers 2124 km in 42h 15m.
- 19420 / Tiruchchirappalli–Ahmedabad Weekly Express has an average speed of 54 km/h and covers 2124 km in 39h 30m.

== Schedule ==
- 19419 – 9:20 AM (Thursday) [Ahmedabad Junction]
- 19420 – 5:45 AM (Wednesday) [Tiruchchirappalli Junction]

== Routes and halts ==
The important halts of the train are :

- Ahmedabad Junction
- Vadodara Junction
- Surat
- Valsad
- Vapi
- Vasai Road
- Kalyan Junction
- Pune Junction
- Solapur Junction
- Kalaburagi Junction
- Wadi Junction
- Krishna
- Raichur Junction
- Mantralayam Road
- Adoni
- Guntakal Junction
- Tadipatri
- Kadapa
- Renigunta Junction
- Arakkonam Junction
- Perambur
- Chennai Egmore
- Tambaram
- Chengalpattu Junction
- Villupuram Junction
- Cuddalore Port Junction
- Chidambaram
- Sirkazhi
- Vaithisvarankoil
- Mayiladuthurai Junction
- Kumbakonam
- Papanasam
- Thanjavur Junction
- Tiruchchirappalli Junction

== Coach composition ==
The train has 20 coaches are :

1. General Unreserved - 4
2. Sleeper Class - 12
3. AC 3rd Class - 3
4. AC 2nd Class - 1

== Traction ==
As the route is fully electrified, it is hauled by a Royapuram Loco Shed-based WAP-7 electric locomotive from Ahmedabad Junction to Tiruchchirappalli Junction and vice versa.

== Rake reversal or rake share ==
No rake reversal or rake share.

== See also ==
Trains from Ahmedabad Junction :

1. Ahmedabad–Bhagalpur Amrit Bharat Express
2. Ahmedabad–Bhuj Namo Bharat Rapid Rail
3. Azimabad Express
4. Ahmedabad–Saharsa Express
5. Mumbai Central–Ahmedabad Shatabdi Express

Trains from Tiruchchirappalli Junction :

1. Sri Ganganagar–Tiruchirappalli Humsafar Express
2. Rockfort Express
3. Tiruchirappalli–Howrah Superfast Express
4. Tiruchirappalli–Thiruvananthapuram Intercity Express
5. Tiruchchirappalli–New Jalpaiguri Amrit Bharat Express

== Notes ==
a. Runs a day in a week with both directions.
