= List of railway stations in Tiruchirappalli =

Tiruchirappalli is the fourth largest city in the Indian state of Tamil Nadu, situated 322 kilometres south of Chennai and is almost situated at the geographic centre of the state. The city houses the Trichy railway division, and is served by several railway stations, of which the most prominent one being the Tiruchirappalli Junction, which is connected by 5 different branches towards Thanjavur, Pudukottai, Dindigul, Karur and Virudhachalam. Tiruchirappalli has rail connectivity with most important cities and towns in India.

== List of urban railway stations in Tiruchirappalli ==
List of urban railway stations in Tiruchirappalli
#	Image	Station Name		Railway Station Code	District	Line
#	Image	English	Tamil	Railway Station Code	District	Line
1		Tiruchirappalli Junction	திருச்சிராப்பள்ளி சந்திப்பு	TPJ	Trichy	
2		Tiruchirappalli Fort	திருச்சிராப்பள்ளி கோட்டை	TP	Trichy	
3		Tiruchirappalli Town	திருச்சிராப்பள்ளி டவுன்	TPTN	Trichy	Chord line
4		Golden Rock	பொன்மலை	TP	Trichy	
5		Tiruchirappalli Palakkarai	திருச்சிராப்பள்ளி பாலக்கரை	TPE	Trichy	
6		Manjattidal	மஞ்சத்திடல்	MCJ	Trichy	
7		Tiruverumbur	திருவெறும்பூர்	TRB	Trichy	
8		Srirangam	ஸ்ரீரங்கம்	SRGM	Trichy	Chord line
9		Mutharasanallur	முத்தாரசாநல்லூர்	MRU	Trichy	Chord line
10		Poongodi	பூங்குடி	SRGM	Trichy	Chord line
11		Uttamarkovil	உத்தமர்கோவில்	UKV	Trichy	Chord line
12		Pichchandarkovil	பிச்சான்டர்கோவில்	BXS	Trichy	Chord line
13		Valadi	வாளடி	VLD	Trichy	Chord line
14		Lalgudi	லால்குடி	LLI	Trichy	Chord line
15		Kumaramangalam	குமாரமங்கலம்	KRMU	Puthukottai	Chord line
16		Thondaimaanpatti	தொண்டைமான்பட்டி	SRGM	Trichy	Chord line

== List of Suburb railway stations in Tiruchirapalli ==
List of Suburb railway stations in Tiruchirappalli
#	Image	Station Name		Railway Station Code	District	line
#	Image	English	Tamil	Railway Station Code	District	line
1		Jiyapuram	ஜியபுரம்	SRGM	Trichy	Chord line
2		Perugamani	பெருகமணி	SRGM	Trichy	Chord line
3		Elamanur	எலமனுர்	SRGM	Trichy	Chord line
4		Pettavaithalai	பெட்டவாய்த்தலை	PLI	Trichy	Chord line
5		Inamkulathur	இனம்குளத்தூர்	SRGM	புதுக்கோட்டை	Chord line
6		Thondaimaanallur	தொண்டைமாநல்லூர்	SRGM	புதுக்கோட்டை	Chord line
7		Solangampatti	சோலங்கம்பட்டி	SRGM	புட்டுக்கோட்டை	Chord line

== See also ==
- Transport in Tiruchirappalli
