= Kollidam railway station =

Railway station in Tamil Nadu, India

Kollidam

General information
- Other names: Coleroon
- Location: NH 45A, Kollidam, Mayiladuthurai district, Tamil Nadu; India
- Coordinates: 11.328422°N 79.719296°E
- Elevation: 7 metres (23 ft)
- System: Indian Railways station
- Owner: Indian Railways
- Operator: Southern Railway zone
- Line: Chennai Egmore–Thanjavur main line
- Platforms: 2
- Tracks: 2
- Connections: Bus stand, Taxicab stand, Auto rickshaw stand

Construction
- Structure type: Standard (on ground station)
- Parking: Available
- Accessible: Yes

Other information
- Status: Functioning
- Station code: CLN
- Zone(s): Southern Railway zone
- Division(s): Tiruchirappalli
- Fare zone: Indian Railways

History
- Opened: 1 January 1878
- Electrified: 28 January 2020
Location
- Location within Tamil Nadu Location within India

Kollidam railway station (station code: CLN), formerly known as Coleroon railway station, serves Kollidam, a panchayat town in Mayiladuthurai district, Tamil Nadu, India. The station is classified as NSG–6 category station a part of the Southern Railway zone of Indian Railways and is administered by Tiruchirappalli railway division. The station is lies on the Chennai Egmore–Thanjavur main line.

== Location and layout ==
The railway station is located on the Kollidam-Alakudi road, and 0.5 km (0.31 mi) for the Kollidam bus stop. The nearest airport is situated 162 km (101 mi) away in Tiruchirappalli.

== Lines ==
The station was opened on 1 January 1878 as a part of Coleroon (Kollidam)–Sirkazhi (9.75 km) section which lies on the Chennai Egmore–Thanjavur main line. It is situated between Chidambaram and Sirkazhi railway stations.

In 1878, a bridge with 14 spans of 150 feet each was opened across the Kollidam (Coleroon) River.

The station has direct daily services to destinations including Villupuram, Chidambaram, Mayiladuthurai and Thanjavur railway stations.
