= Kodiyampalayam =

Island with Mangrove forests, located in Mayiladuthurai district

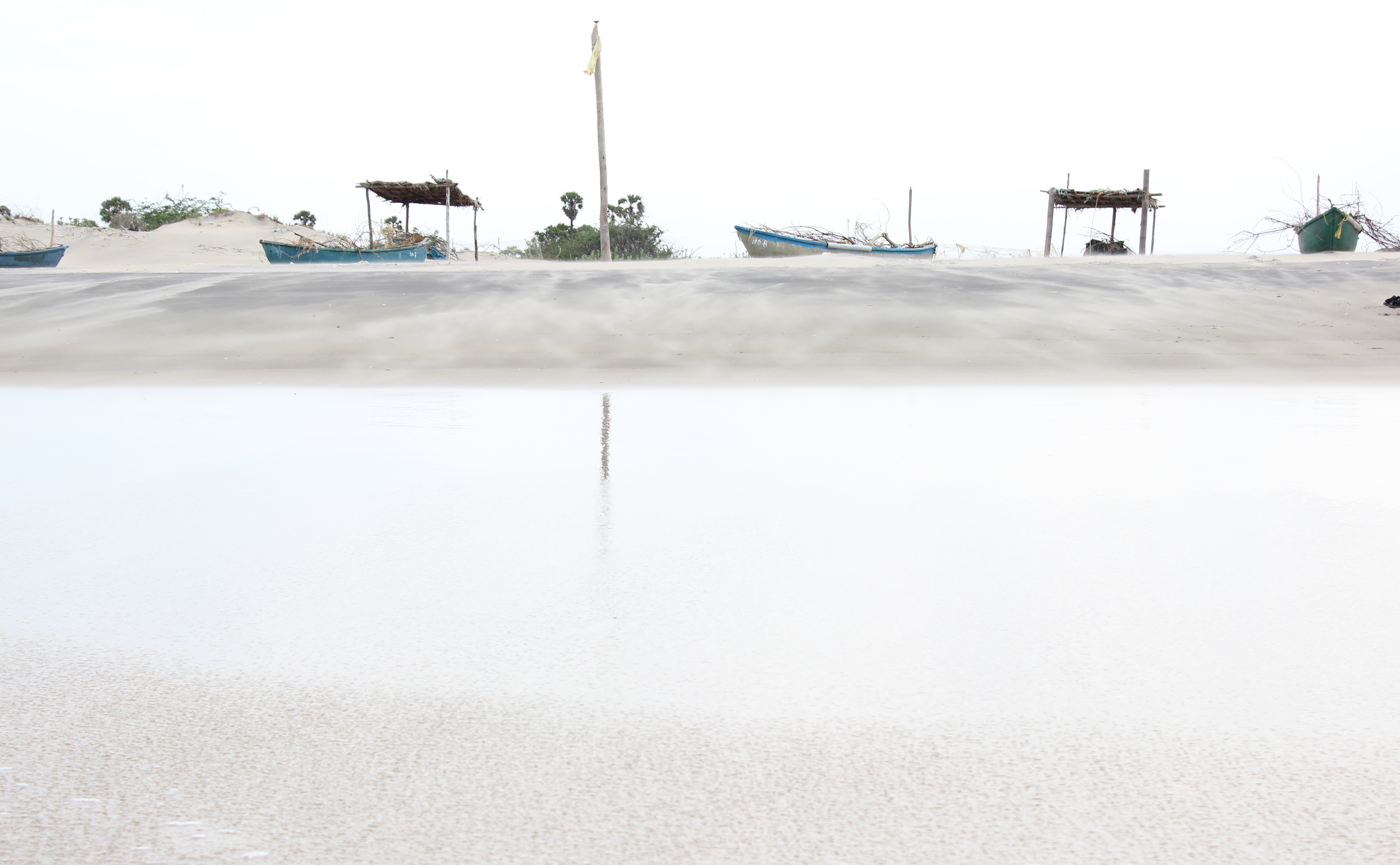
- Kodiyampalayam beach

- Location within Tamil Nadu
- Coordinates: 11.38°N 79.81°E
- Country: India
- State: Tamil Nadu
- District: Mayiladuthurai
- Taluk: Sirkazhi
- Town Panchayath: Kollidam

Area
  - Total: 1.2 km^{2} (0.46 sq mi)
- Elevation: 6 m (20 ft)

Kodiyampalayam (Tamil: [koɖijampaːʎajam], ISO: Koṭiyam-pāḷaiyam), is a continental island surrounded by Mangrove forests, located in Mayiladuthurai district, in Tamil Nadu, India. The island situated at the mouth of Kollidam river, a northern distributary of the Cauvery River. The island is located between the Kollidam river and Bay of Bengal.

Kodiyampalayam is part of the Kollidam block. It falls under the Sirkazhi Legislative Assembly constituency and the Mayiladuthurai parliamentary constituency.

== Geography ==
The island is located 37 km (23 mi) from its district headquarters, Mayiladuthurai, 12 km (7.5 mi) from Kollidam, 20 km (12 mi) from Chidambaram, 16 km (9.9 mi) from Pichavaram, and 225 km (140 mi) from the state capital, Chennai.

The nearest railway station is Chidambaram railway station 16 km (9.9 mi) from the island, and the nearest airport is Tiruchirappalli (IATA: TRZ) 171 km (106 mi) from the island.

== Demographics ==
According to the 2011 Census, Kodiyampalayam has approximately 2,000 people, most of whom are engaged in fishing.

== Tourist attractions ==
=== Mangrove ===
Kodiyampalayam Island is surrounded by Mangrove forests, which extend from Pichavaram in Cuddalore district to the islands of Kodiyampalayam in Mayiladuthurai district. The Pichavaram mangrove forest is one of the largest mangrove forests in India covering about 1,478 ha (14.78 km^{2}) of area (as of 2022). It is separated from the Bay of Bengal by a sand bar. The backwaters are interconnected by the Vellar and Coleroon river systems. The biotope consists of species like Avicennia and Rhizophora. It also supports the existence of rare varieties of economically important shells and fishes. The mangroves support unique diversity of flora and fauna.

Under an initiative of the Government of Tamil Nadu aimed at reducing the impact of cyclones, tidal surges, and coastal erosion, as well as supporting biodiversity and local livelihoods, mangroves have been planted in the Mayiladuthurai district along with nine other districts. According to official statistics, more than 2,900 ha (29 km^{2}) of mangrove forests have been planted or restored from 2021 to 2025 under this programme.

=== Beach ===
Kodiyampalayam also has a beach that attracts both locals and tourists. According to records, approximately 40,000 people visited the beach in 2022, 60,000 in 2023, and 75,000 in 2024. On 25 March 2025, following requests from local MLAs, the tourism department prepared a detailed project report for Kodiyampalayam, proposing the construction of a viewing deck, visitor plaza, information desks, restrooms, pathways, lighting, and landscaped gardens to improve facilities and enhance the visitor experience. Tourism Minister R. Rajendran inspected the site, and the project report has been submitted to the government pending funding approval.

== Fauna ==
Kodiyampalayam, whose mangrove ecosystem forms a continuous part of the Pichavaram wetlands, attracts a variety of local bird species. The mangroves also attract migrant and local birds including snipes, cormorants, egrets, storks, herons, spoonbills and pelicans. About 177 species of birds belonging to 15 orders and 41 families have been recorded. The high population of birds could be seen from November to January due to the high availability of prey, the coincidence of the time of arrival of true migrants from foreign countries and local migrants from their breeding grounds across India.
