= Mannargudi–Mayiladuthurai Passenger =

Train in India

Mannargudi – Mayiladuthurai Passenger
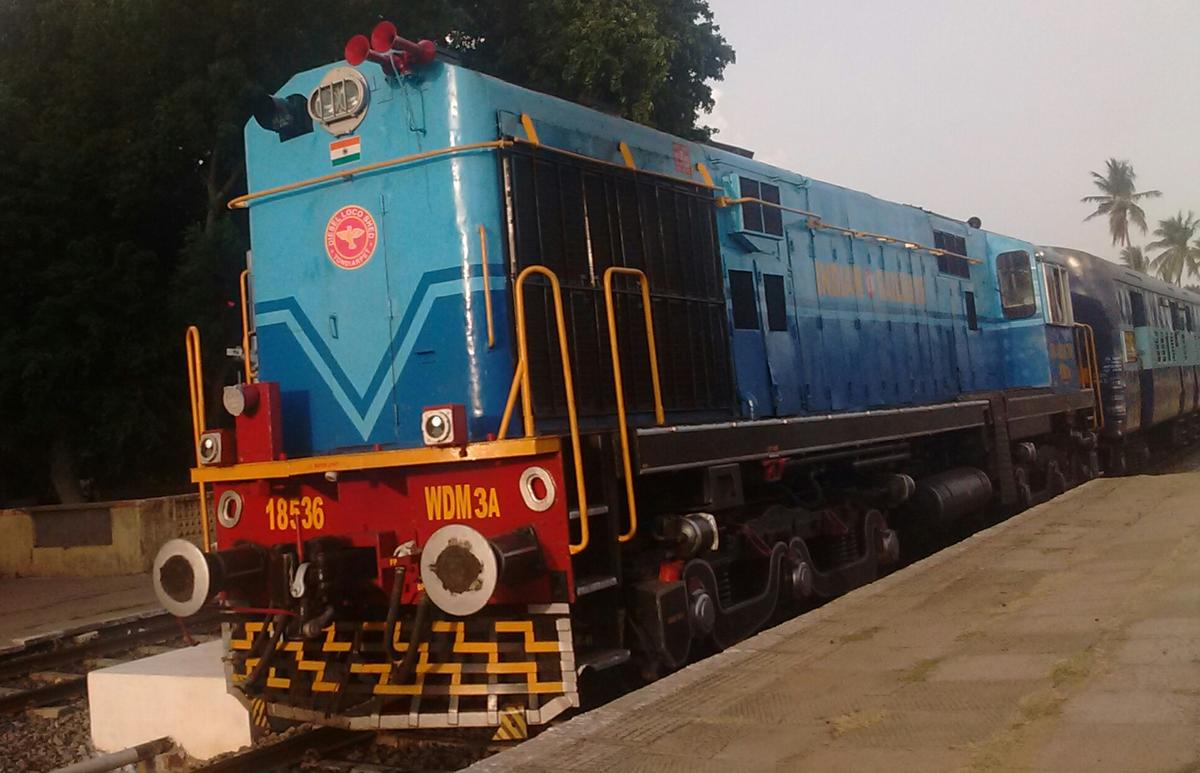

Overview
- Service type: Passenger
- Locale: Tamil Nadu
- Current operator: Southern Railway zone

Route
- Termini: Mannargudi railway (MQ); Mayiladuthurai Junction railway (MV)
- Stops: 8
- Distance travelled: 76.2 km
- Average journey time: 2h
- Service frequency: Daily
- Train number: 56001 / 56002

On-board services
- Class: Unreserved
- Seating arrangements: Yes
- Sleeping arrangements: No
- Auto-rack arrangements: No
- Catering facilities: No
- Observation facilities: ICF coach
- Entertainment facilities: No
- Baggage facilities: Below the seats

Technical
- Rolling stock: 2
- Operating speed: 38 km/h (average with halts)

The Mannargudi – Mayiladuthurai Passenger is a passenger train of the Southern Railway zone of Indian Railways. It runs daily between Mannargudi and Mayiladuthurai Junction in Tamil Nadu.

== Rake sharing ==
The Mannargudi – Mayiladuthurai Passenger (56001/56002) was operated using the same rake as the Mannai Express (16179/16180). After arriving at Mannargudi in the morning as Mannai Express from Chennai Egmore, the rake was deployed in the evening as the Mannargudi – Mayiladuthurai Passenger. It returned at night from Mayiladuthurai to Mannargudi. During its passenger service run, the air-conditioned coaches of the rake were locked. Later, they were opened again when the rake resumed service as the Mannai Express.

== Route and halts ==
The train runs on the Mannargudi–Thiruvarur line and Mayiladuthurai–Thiruvarur line. Important halts of the train are:

- Mannargudi (MQ)
- Needamangalam Junction (NMJ)
- Koradacheri (KDE)
- Thiruvarur Junction (TVR)
- Nannilam (NNM)
- Punthottam (POM)
- Peralam (PEM)
- Mayiladuthurai Junction (MV)

== Schedule ==
=== Mannargudi → Mayiladuthurai ===
Mannargudi → Mayiladuthurai
No	Code	Station	Arrival	Departure	Halt	Day	Distance (km)	Elevation (m)	PF	Zone
1	MQ	Mannargudi	–	08:35	–	1	0	17	1	SR
2	NMJ	Nidamangalam Jn	08:56	08:57	1m	1	13	27	–	SR
3	KDE	Koradacheri	09:06	09:07	1m	1	22	20	–	SR
4	TMU	Tirumanthikunam	09:12	09:13	1m	1	27	14	–	SR
5	KU	Kulikarai	09:18	09:19	1m	1	32	16	–	SR
6	TVR	Thiruvarur Jn	09:27	09:30	3m	1	37	10	–	SR
7	NNM	Nannilam	09:46	09:47	1m	1	52	9	–	SR
8	POM	Punthottam	09:53	09:54	1m	1	57	10	–	SR
9	PEM	Peralam	09:59	10:00	1m	1	60	11	–	SR
10	MV	Mayiladuthurai Jn	10:40	–	–	1	76	13	–	SR

=== Mayiladuthurai → Mannargudi ===
Mayiladuthurai → Mannargudi
No	Code	Station	Arrival	Departure	Halt	Day	Distance (km)	Elevation (m)	PF	Zone
1	MV	Mayiladuthurai Jn	–	17:15	–	1	0	13	–	SR
2	PEM	Peralam	17:31	17:32	1m	1	16	11	–	SR
3	POM	Punthottam	17:37	17:38	1m	1	19	10	–	SR
4	NNM	Nannilam	17:44	17:45	1m	1	24	9	–	SR
5	TVR	Thiruvarur Jn	18:05	18:08	3m	1	39	10	–	SR
6	KU	Kulikarai	18:16	18:17	1m	1	44	16	–	SR
7	TMU	Tirumanthikunam	18:22	18:23	1m	1	49	14	–	SR
8	KDE	Koradacheri	18:31	18:32	1m	1	54	20	–	SR
9	NMJ	Nidamangalam Jn	18:41	18:43	2m	1	63	27	–	SR
10	MQ	Mannargudi	19:10	–	–	1	76	17	1	SR

== Coach composition ==
The Mannargudi – Mayiladuthurai Passenger runs between Mannargudi and Mayiladuthurai. It has a rake sharing agreement (RSA) with the Mannai Express operating between Mannargudi and Chennai. These two rakes are also utilized for the operation of the Chendur Express between Chennai and Tiruchendur, as well as the Tiruchendur – Tirunelveli – Tiruchendur (06405 / 06406) passenger services.

It has one AC First Class, one AC Two Tier, one AC Three Tier, nine Sleeper Class, and four Unreserved General Sitting coaches.

Loco	1	2	3	4	5	6	7	8	9	10	11	12	13	14	15	16	17	18
	SLR	UR	UR	H1	A1	B1	S1	S2	S3	S4	S5	S6	S7	S8	S9	UR	UR	SLR

== See also ==
- Mannargudi railway station
- Mayiladuthurai Junction railway station
- Mannai Express
