= Mannai Express =

Train in India

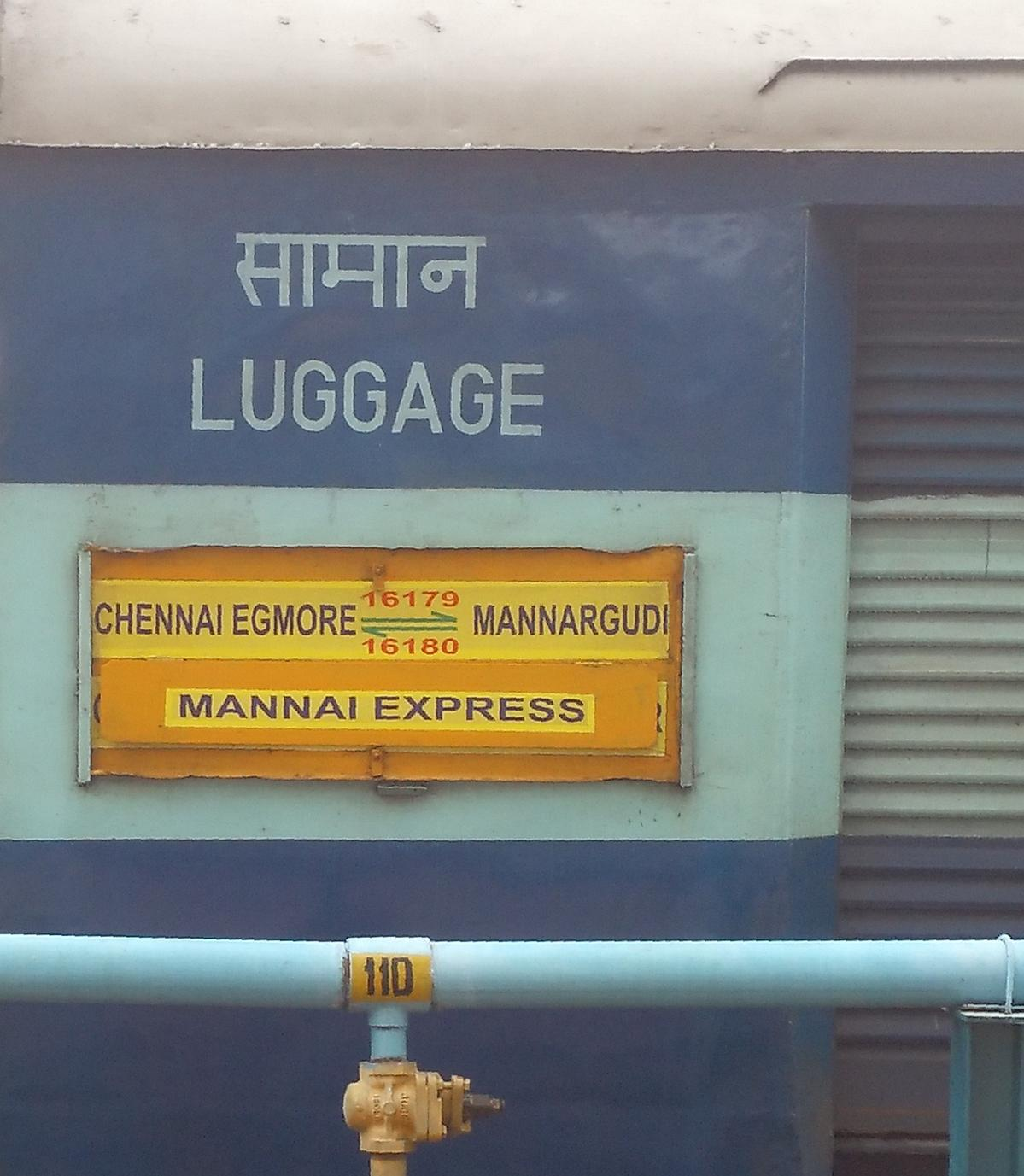

Overview
- Service type: Mail/Express
- Status: Active
- Locale: Tamil Nadu
- First service: 27 September 2011
- Current operator: Southern Railway zone
- Ridership: Express

Route
- Termini: Chennai Egmore (MS); Mannargudi (MQ)
- Stops: 07
- Distance travelled: 357 km (222 mi)
- Average journey time: 07 hours 05 minutes
- Service frequency: Daily
- Train number: 16179 / 16180
- Line used: MS ↔ MV Main Line / MV ↔ NMJ Main Line / NMJ ↔ MQ Line (Two Rake Reversal)

On-board services
- Classes: 1A, 2A, 3A, SL, GS & SLRD
- Disabled access: Disabled access
- Seating arrangements: Yes
- Sleeping arrangements: Yes
- Catering facilities: No
- Observation facilities: Large windows in all carriages
- Entertainment facilities: No

Technical
- Rolling stock: WAP-4 from Arakkonam, Erode Electric Loco Shed
- Track gauge: 1,676 mm (5 ft 6 in)
- Electrification: 25kV AC, 50 Hz (Overhead line)
- Operating speed: 55 km/h (34 mph) (Present service speed); 110 km/h (68 mph) (Maximum Permissible speed)
- Rake maintenance: Tirunelveli Yard
- Rake sharing: Tiruchendur (Chendur) Express (16105 / 16106); Mannargudi – Mayiladuthurai – Mannargudi Express Special (06403 / 06404); Tiruchendur – Tirunelveli – Tiruchendur Express Special (06405 / 06406)
Route map
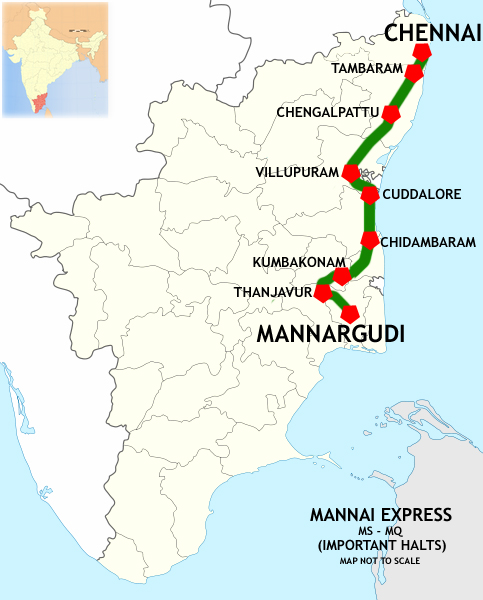

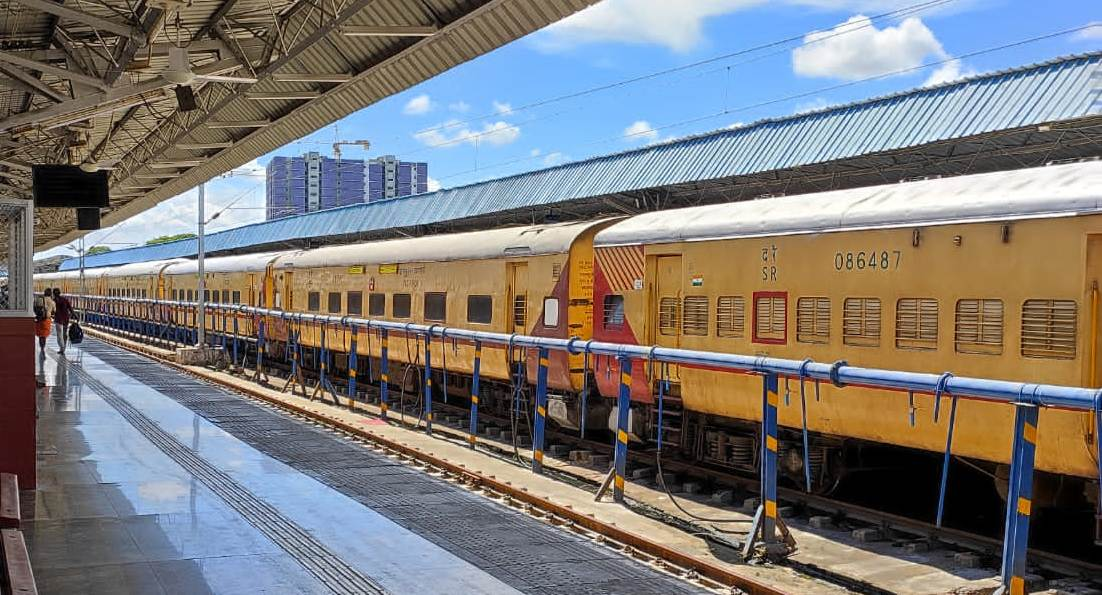
Mannai Express halting at Chennai Egmore

The Mannai Express is an express train operated by the Southern Railway zone of the Indian Railways. This train connects Chennai Egmore and Mannargudi via Villupuram, Mayiladuthurai and Thiruvarur in the Indian state of Tamil Nadu. The traffic was opened in 2011.

== History ==
This train initially ran through Nidamangalam Junction, Thanjavur Junction, Kumbakonam, Mayiladuthurai Junction, Chidambaram, Villupuram Junction, Tambaram and reaches Chennai Egmore. But this train is rerouted via Nidamangalam Junction, Thiruvarur Junction, Mayiladuthurai Junction and continues till Chennai Egmore via the old existing route. Indian Railways had taken this decision due to some technical reasons caused by this train. But people from Kumbakonam, Thanjavur, started opposing railways decision. But this train is diverted via Thiruvarur Junction during mid of 2017 in the month of March after a long demand from the Thiruvarur and Cauvery Delta district peoples. After Sept 16 2023, There is an additional stoppage given by Indian Railways at Koradacheri on both directions. The technical reasons railways quoted are:

1. This train causes 2 loco reversals (one at Nidamangalam Junction and another at Thanjavur Junction) which causes more technical difficulties and loss of time and fuel.
2. while operating this train in the newly diverted route, it can over come those loco reversal problems and it is a shorter distance for Mannargudi when compared with the old route.

== Route and halts ==
This train is being operated via the main line and hauled by an electric locomotive from Chennai Egmore to Mannargudi.

== Schedule ==
16179 ~ Chennai Egmore → Mannargudi
Station Name	Station Code	Arrival	Departure	Day
Chennai Egmore	MS	-	22:55	1
Tambaram	TBM	23:23	23:25	1
Chengalpattu Junction	CGL	23:53	23:55	1
Villupuram Junction	VM	01:25	01:30	2
Chidambaram	CDM	03:33	03:35	2
Mayiladuthurai Junction	MV	04:13	04:15	2
Thiruvarur Junction	TVR	04:50	04:55	2
Koradacheri	KDE	05:11	05:12	2
Needamangalam Junction	NMJ	05:22	05:24	2
Mannargudi	MQ	06:20	-	
16180 ~ Mannargudi → Chennai Egmore
Mannargudi	MQ	-	22:35	1
Needamangalam Junction	NMJ	22:50	22:52	1
Koradacheri	KDE	23:01	23:02	1
Thiruvarur Junction	TVR	23:20	23:25	1
Mayiladuthurai Junction	MV	00:01	00:03	2
Chidambaram	CDM	00:38	00:40	2
Villupuram Junction	VM	02:35	02:40	2
Chengalpattu Junction	CGL	04:08	04:10	2
Tambaram	TBM	04:38	04:40	2
Mambalam	MBM	04:58	05:00	2
Chennai Egmore	MS	05:35	-	2

== Coach composition ==
The Mannai Express runs between Chennai Egmore and Mannargudi has a rake sharing agreement (RSA) with Chendur Express between Chennai and Tiruchendur. These two rakes are used for operating Mannargudi – Mayiladuthurai – Mannargudi (06403 / 06404) and Tiruchendur – Tirunelveli – Tiruchendur (06405/ 06406) passenger trains.

It has one AC First Class, one Ac Two Tier, one AC Three Tier, nine Sleeper class, four Unreserved general sitting coach.

Loco	1	2	3	4	5	6	7	8	9	10	11	12	13	14	15	16	17	18
	SLR	UR	UR	H1	A1	B1	S1	S2	S3	S4	S5	S6	S7	S8	S9	UR	UR	SLR
