= Mannargudi–Tiruchchirappalli DEMU =

Train in India

Mannargudi – Tiruchchirappalli DEMU
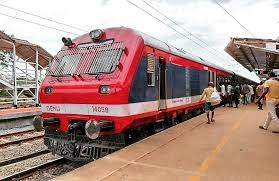

Overview
- Service type: DEMU
- Status: Active
- Locale: Tamil Nadu
- Current operator: Southern Railway zone
- Ridership: Passenger/DEMU

Route
- Termini: Mannargudi (MQ); Tiruchchirappalli Junction (TPJ)
- Stops: 10
- Distance travelled: 85 km (53 mi)
- Average journey time: 2 hours 15 minutes
- Service frequency: Daily
- Train number: 76835 / 76836
- Line used: Mannargudi – Thiruvarur – Thanjavur – Tiruchchirappalli line

On-board services
- Class: Unreserved
- Disabled access: Disabled access
- Seating arrangements: Yes
- Sleeping arrangements: No
- Catering facilities: No
- Observation facilities: Large windows in all carriages
- Entertainment facilities: No
- Baggage facilities: Below seats

Technical
- Rolling stock: DEMU rake
- Track gauge: 1,676 mm (5 ft 6 in)
- Electrification: No (Diesel operated)
- Operating speed: 40 km/h (25 mph) (average); 100 km/h (62 mph) (Maximum Permissible speed)
- Rake maintenance: Tiruchchirappalli Yard
- Rake sharing: None

The Mannargudi – Tiruchchirappalli DEMU is a DEMU operated by the Southern Railway zone of Indian Railways. This daily passenger service connects Mannargudi in Tiruvarur district with Tiruchchirappalli Junction via Needamangalam, Thiruvarur, and Thanjavur, serving commuters of the Cauvery delta region.

== Route and halts ==
The DEMU runs on the Mannargudi–Thanjavur line and the Thanjavur–Tirucchhirappalli line. The important halts of the train are:

- Mannargudi (MQ)
- Nidamangalam Junction (NMJ)
- Thanjavur Junction (TJ)
- Budalur (BAL)
- Tiruchchirappalli Junction (TPJ)

== Schedule ==
=== Mannargudi → Tiruchchirappalli ===
No	Code	Station	Arrival	Departure	Halt	Day	Distance (km)	Elevation (m)	PF	Zone
1	MQ	Mannargudi	–	06:25	–	1	0	17	1	SR
2	NMJ	Nidamangalam Jn	06:42	06:50	8m	1	13	27	1	SR
3	KYV	Koyilvenni	06:55	06:56	1m	1	19	27	1	SR
4	AMT	Ammapet	07:01	07:02	1m	1	23	31	1	SR
5	SMM	Saliyamangalam	07:09	07:10	1m	1	29	42	1	SR
6	KXO	Kudikadu	07:15	07:16	1m	1	32	40	1	SR
7	TJ	Thanjavur Jn	07:30	07:33	3m	1	44	57	3	SR
8	ALK	Alakkudi	07:44	07:45	1m	1	53	49	–	SR
9	BAL	Budalur	07:52	07:53	1m	1	61	41	–	SR
10	AYN	Aiyanapuram	07:59	08:00	1m	1	66	49	2	SR
11	SGM	Solgampatti	08:06	08:07	1m	1	72	63	–	SR
12	TOM	Tondamanpatti	08:13	08:14	1m	1	78	75	1	SR
13	TRB	Tiruverumbur	08:21	08:22	1m	1	83	68	1	SR
14	MCJ	Manjattidal	08:28	08:29	1m	1	88	68	–	SR
15	GOC	Ponmalai	08:34	08:35	1m	1	91	58	–	SR
16	TPJ	Tiruchchirappalli Jn	09:10	–	–	1	93	86	–	SR

=== Tiruchchirappalli → Mannargudi ===
No	Code	Station	Arrival	Departure	Halt	Day	Distance (km)	Elevation (m)	PF	Zone
1	TPJ	Tiruchchirappalli Jn	–	18:55	–	1	0.0	86	–	SR
2	GOC	Ponmalai	19:03	19:04	1m	1	3	58	–	SR
3	TRB	Tiruverumbur	19:16	19:17	1m	1	10	68	–	SR
4	SGM	Solgampatti	19:29	19:30	1m	1	21	63	–	SR
5	AYN	Aiyanapuram	19:35	19:36	1m	1	28	49	–	SR
6	BAL	Budalur	19:41	19:42	1m	1	32	41	–	SR
7	ALK	Alakkudi	19:49	19:50	1m	1	40	49	–	SR
8	TJ	Thanjavur Jn	19:59	20:02	3m	1	50	57	–	SR
9	KXO	Kudikadu	20:12	20:13	1m	1	61	40	–	SR
10	SMM	Saliyamangalam	20:18	20:19	1m	1	65	42	–	SR
11	AMT	Ammapet	20:25	20:26	1m	1	70	31	–	SR
12	KYV	Koyilvenni	20:31	20:32	1m	1	75	27	–	SR
13	NMJ	Nidamangalam Jn	20:46	20:51	5m	1	80	27	–	SR
14	MQ	Mannargudi	21:20	–	–	1	93	17	–	SR

== Coach composition ==
The DEMU service usually consists of 8 coaches, with two Driving Motor Coaches (DMC) and six trailer coaches. Seating is in 2+3 layout with wide windows.

== See also ==
- Tiruchchirappalli Junction railway station
- Mannargudi railway station
- Southern Railway zone
