= Pattukkottai railway station =

Railway station in Tamil Nadu, India

Pattukkottai
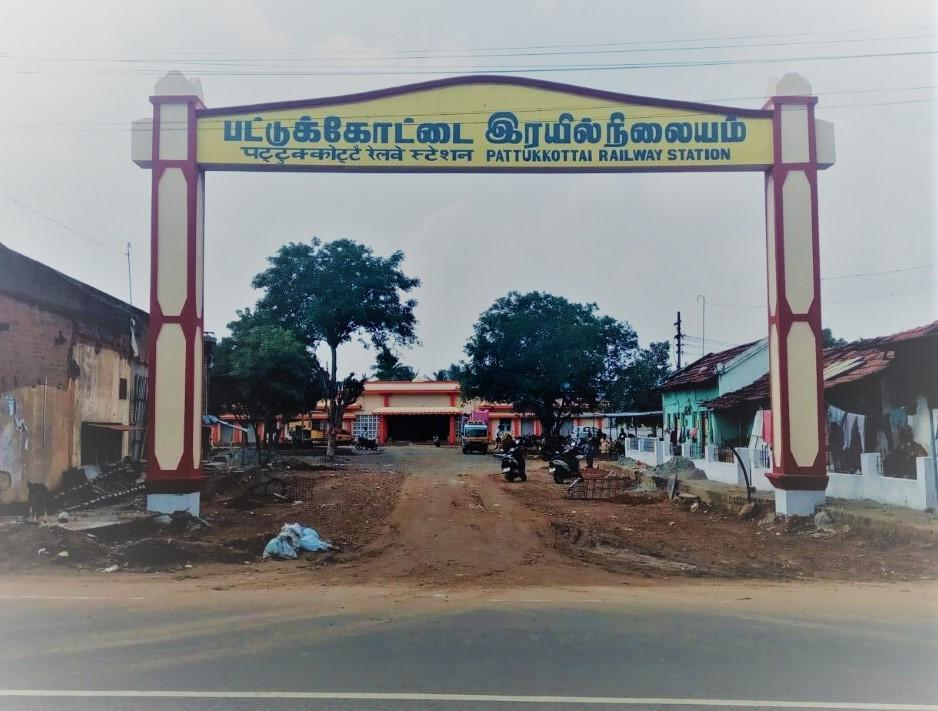
- The Main Entrance of the Station

General information
- Location: Railway Station Road or Adirampattinam road, Pattukkottai, Thanjavur district, Tamil Nadu; India
- Coordinates: 10.4168°N 79.3190°E
- Elevation: 23 metres (75 ft)
- System: Express train, commuter rail, Passenger train and Goods train station
- Owner: Indian Railways
- Operator: Southern Railway zone
- Line: Thiruvarur–Karaikudi line Nidamangalam Junction–Pattukkottai line (under construction) Thanjavur Junction–Pattukkottai branch line (proposed)
- Platforms: 3 + 1
- Tracks: 4
- Connections: auto rickshaw stand

Construction
- Structure type: Standard (on-ground station)
- Parking: Available
- Accessible: Disabled access

Other information
- Status: Active
- Station code: PKT
- Zone(s): Southern Railway zone
- Division(s): Tiruchirapalli

History
- Opened: 1902; 124 years ago
- Rebuilt: 2019; 7 years ago
- Electrified: Under process
Route map
Location
- Location within India Location within Tamil Nadu

Pattukkottai railway station (station code: PKT) is an NSG–5 category Indian railway station in Tiruchirappalli railway division of Southern Railway zone. It is a railway station serving the town of Pattukkottai in Tamil Nadu, India. This station was first opened on 20.10.1902 along with muthupettai to pattukottai section before independence. This station located in the thiruvarur -karaikudi section one of the longest stretch in Tiruchirappalli railway division .

== Trains ==
After reopening only 4 trains

== Lines ==
The station is a focal point of Thiruvarur–Karaikudi line. additionally two New lines via Pattukottai have been approved by Indian Railways. One is Mannargudi–Pattukkottai branch line and the other is Thanjavur Junction–Pattukkottai branch line. These new lines make Pattukottai a junction railway station.
