= Vaithisvarankoil railway station =

Railway station in Tamil Nadu, India

Vaithisvarankoil

General information
- Location: SH 150, Vaitheeswarankoil, Mayiladuthurai district, Tamil Nadu; India
- Coordinates: 11.195671°N 79.703944°E
- Elevation: 7 metres (23 ft)
- System: Indian Railways station
- Owner: Indian Railways
- Operator: Southern Railway zone
- Line: Chennai Egmore–Thanjavur main line
- Platforms: 2
- Tracks: 2
- Connections: Auto rickshaw stand

Construction
- Structure type: Standard (on ground station)
- Parking: Available
- Accessible: Yes

Other information
- Status: Functioning
- Station code: CLN
- Zone(s): Southern Railway zone
- Division(s): Tiruchirappalli
- Fare zone: Indian Railways

History
- Opened: 1 July 1877
- Electrified: 28 January 2020
Location
- Location within Tamil Nadu Location within India

Vaithisvarankoil railway station (station code: VDL), also spelled as Vaitheeswarankoil, is a NSG–6 category railway station serving Vaitheeswarankoil, a panchayat town in Mayiladuthurai district, Tamil Nadu, India. The station is part of the Southern Railway zone of Indian Railways and is administered by the Tiruchirappalli railway division. The station lies on the Chennai Egmore–Thanjavur main line.

== Location and layout ==
The railway station is located on the State Highway 150, which connects Vaitheeswarankoil to Lower Anaicut, and is about 1.1 km (0.68 mi) for the Vaitheeswarankoil bus stop. The nearest airport is situated 124 km (77 mi) away at Tiruchirappalli.

== Lines ==
The station was opened on 1 July 1877 as part of the 19.71 km (12.25 mi) Mayiladuthurai – Sirkazhi section on the Chennai Egmore–Thanjavur main line. It is situated between Mayiladuthurai and Sirkazhi railway stations.

The station has direct daily services to destinations including Villupuram, Chidambaram, Mayiladuthurai and Thanjavur railway stations.

== Place of interest ==
The Vaitheeswaran Koil, a Hindu temple dedicated to Vaidyanathar (Shiva), is located approximately 1 km (0.62 mi) from the railway station. The deity Vaitheeswaran is revered as the “God of healing.”

== See also ==
- Navagraha temple
- Mayuranathaswami temple
- Poompuhar
