= Turinjapuram railway station =

Railway station in Tamil Nadu, India

Coordinates: 12.3174°N 79.0846°E

Turinjapuram

General information
- Location: Mallavadi link road, Thurinjapuram, Tiruvannamalai- 21, Tamil Nadu, India- 606 021
- Elevation: 187 m (614 ft)
- System: Passenger train Station
- Owner: Indian Railways
- Line: Katpadi–Viluppuram line
- Platforms: 1
- Tracks: 3
- Connections: Taxi, Bus

Construction
- Structure type: At–grade
- Parking: Available
- Cycle facilities: Available

Other information
- Station code: TJM
- Fare zone: Southern Railway zone
Location
- Location within India Location within Tamil Nadu

Turinjapuram railway station (station code:TJM) is an NSG–6 category Indian railway station in Tiruchirappalli railway division of Southern Railway zone. It is a railway station serving Tiruvannamalai town, primary being Tiruvannamalai railway station.

== Lines ==
It is on the line connecting Katpadi Junction and Viluppuram Junction.

== Location and layout ==
It is fully electrified railway station. This station has only one platforms.
