= Alagiyamanavalam =

Alagiyamanavalam Awungata
- village
- Location in Tamil Nadu, India Alagiyamanavalam (India)
- Coordinates: 10°57′17″N 79°12′9″E
- Country: India
- State: Tamil Nadu
- District: Ariyalur

Population (2001)
  - Total: 3,750

Languages
  - Official: Tamil
- Time zone: UTC+5:30 (IST)
- Vehicle registration: TN-
- Coastline: 0 kilometres (0 mi)
- Sex ratio: 944 ♂/♀
- Literacy: 59.98%

Alagiyamanavalam is a village in the Ariyalur taluk of Ariyalur district, Tamil Nadu, India. Melaramanallur, an island hamlet located on Kollidam River, is a part of Alagiyamanavalam Revenue Village and Panchayat.

== Demographics ==
As of 2001 census, Alagiyamanavalam had a total population of 3,750 with 1,836 males and 1,734 females.

== See also ==
- List of villages in Ariyalur district
