= Bhagat Ki Kothi–Mannargudi Weekly Express =

Train in India

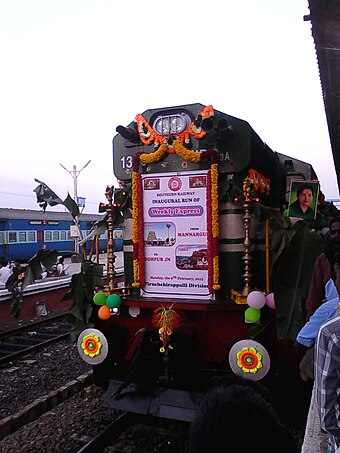
- A train to Jodhpur departing from Mannargudi

Overview
- Service type: Express
- First service: 9 February 2015; 11 years ago
- Current operator: Southern Railway

Route
- Termini: Bhagat Ki Kothi (BGKT); Mannargudi (MQ)
- Stops: 41
- Distance travelled: 2,859 km (1,777 mi)
- Average journey time: 48hrs 25mins
- Service frequency: Weekly
- Train number: 22673 / 22674

On-board services
- Classes: AC 2 Tier, AC 3 Tier, Sleeper class, General Unreserved
- Seating arrangements: No
- Sleeping arrangements: Yes
- Catering facilities: E-catering, On-board catering
- Observation facilities: Large windows
- Baggage facilities: Available

Technical
- Rolling stock: LHB coach
- Track gauge: 1,676 mm (5 ft 6 in)
- Operating speed: 59 km/h (37 mph) average including halt
Route map
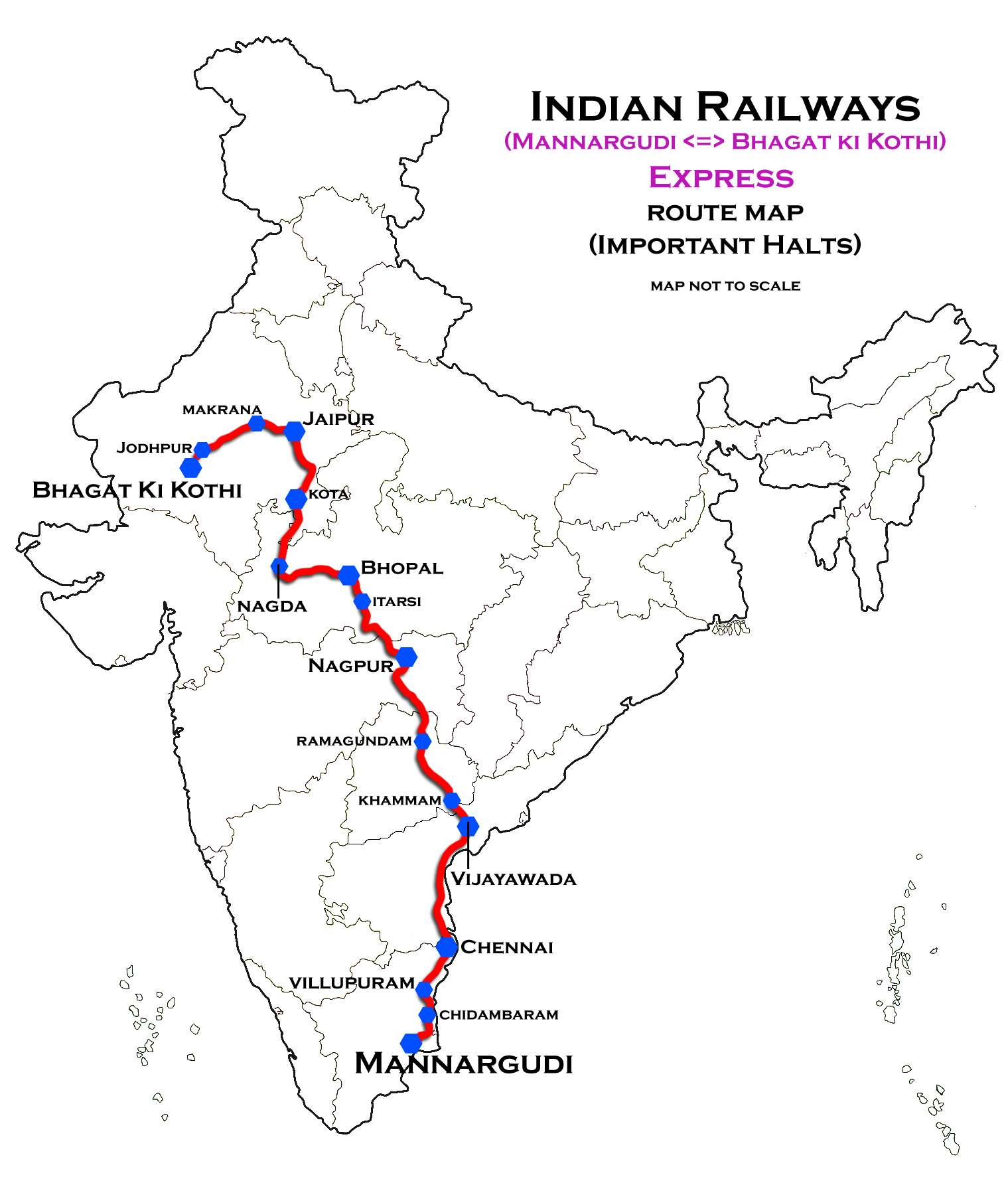

The 22673 / 22674 Bhagat Ki Kothi–Mannargudi Weekly Express is an Express train of the Indian Railways connecting Bhagat Ki Kothi in Rajasthan and Mannargudi in Tamil Nadu. It has been upgraded as a Superfast Express and is currently being operated with 22673/22674 train numbers after vivir lockdown on once a week basis.

== Service ==
The 22673/Bhagat Ki Kothi–Mannargudi Weekly Expresses has an average speed of 57 km/h and covers 2859 km in 48.30 hrs. 22674/Mannargudi–Bhagat ki Kothi Weekly Express has an average speed of 53 km/h and covers 2859 km in 50 hrs 05 mins. This train is being operated by Southern railway zone and maintained at Tiruchirappalli Junction. Empty rakes are transported to Tiruchirappalli after reaching Mannargudi. During its maintenance journey, it has a rake reversal at Nidamangalam Junction.

== Schedule ==
Runs One day for each Side

Train number	Station code	Departure station	Departure time	Departure day	Arrival station	Arrival time	Arrival day
22673	BGKT	Bhagat Ki Kothi	16:10	Thursday	Mannargudi	16:40	Saturday
22674	MQ	Mannargudi	13:10	Monday	Bhagat Ki Kothi	15:15	Wednesday

== Route and halts ==
The important halts of the train are :

- Bhagat Ki Kothi
- Jodhpur Junction
- Merta Road Junction
- Jaipur Junction
- Sawai Madhopur Junction (rake reversal)
- Kota Junction
- Nagda Junction (rake reversal)
- Ujjain Junction
- Bhopal Junction
- Itarsi Junction
- Nagpur Junction
- Balharshah Junction
- Ramagundam
- Warangal
- Vijayawada Junction
- Nellore
- Gudur Junction
- Chennai Egmore
- Tambaram
- Chengalpattu
- Viluppuram Junction
- Thirupadiripuliyur
- Chidambaram
- Mayiladuthurai Junction
- Thiruvarur Junction
- Mannargudi

== Traction ==
As the route is now fully electrified, it is hauled by a Lallaguda Loco Shed or Royapuram Loco Shed-based WAP-7 electric locomotive from Bhagat Ki Kothi to Mannargudi and vice-versa.

== Coach composition ==
The train consists of 22 LHB coaches;

- 2 AC two Tier
- 4 AC three Tier
- 9 Sleeper coaches
- 4 General Unreserved
- 2 SLR cum EoG
- 1 Luggage/parcel van

== Direction reversals ==
The train reverses its direction twice at;

- Sawai Madhopur Junction
- Nagda Junction
- Nidamangalam Junction (during rake maintenance run).

== See also ==
- Bikaner–Coimbatore Superfast AC Express
