= Upper Anaicut =

Dam in Tamil Nadu, India

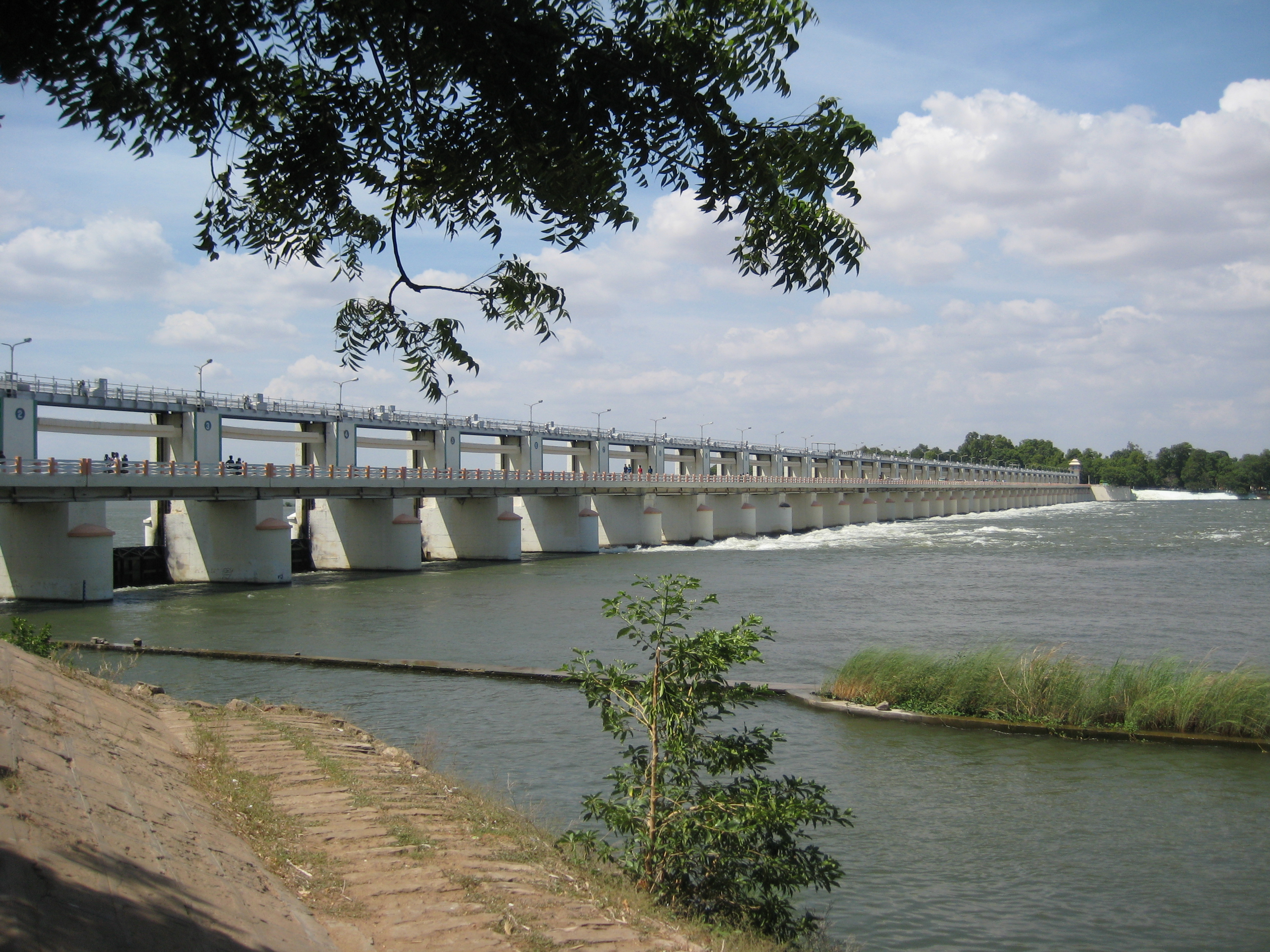
- The Upper Anaicut on the Kaveri between the southern bank and Srirangam. Photographed from the southern bank.

- Location within Tamil Nadu Location within India
- Official name: Upper Anicut
- Coordinates: 10.885666°N 78.5770653°E
- Construction began: 1836
- Opening date: 1838

Dam and spillways
- Impounds: Kaveri River

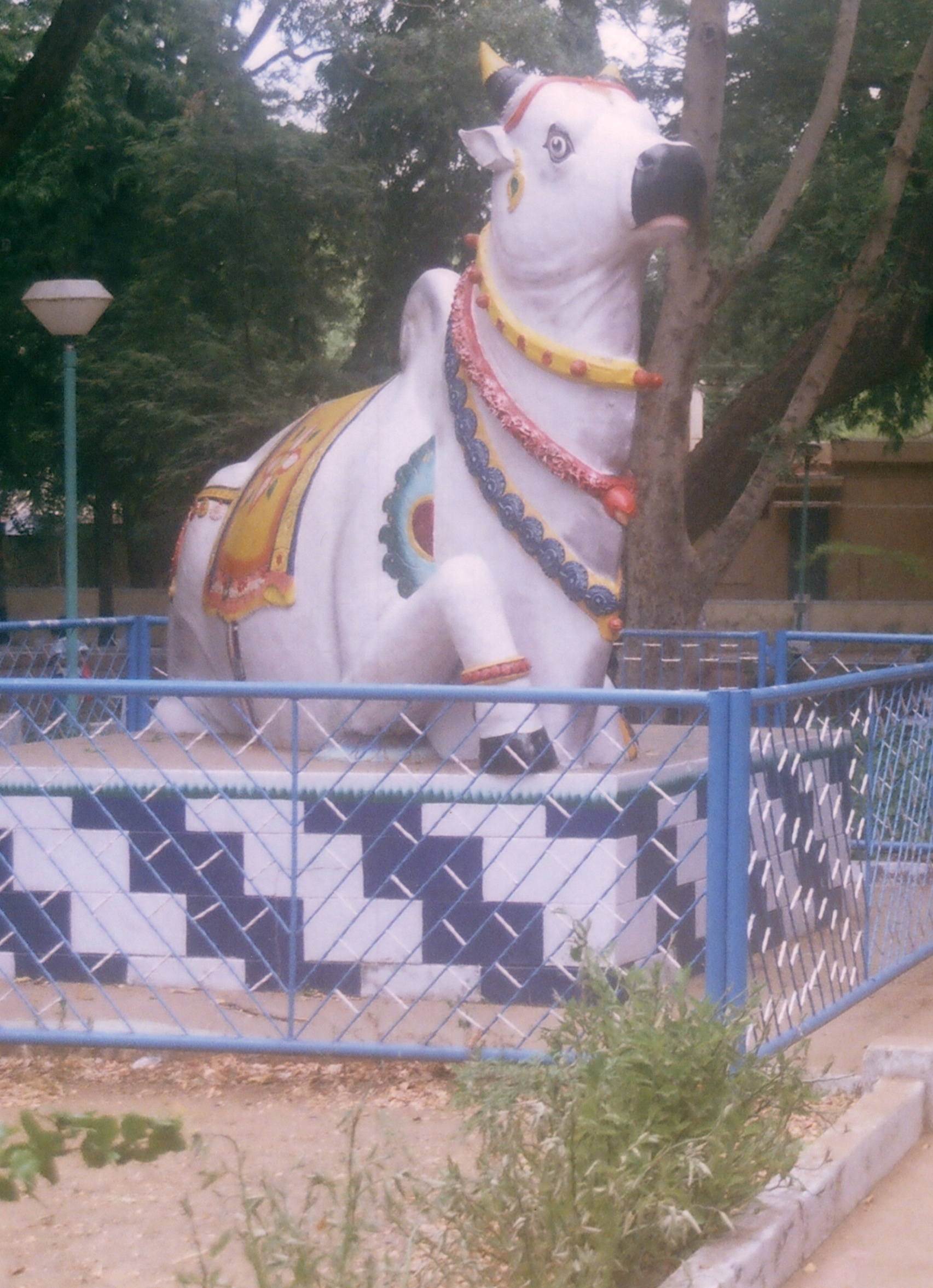
Nandi statue in the gardens near the dam

The Upper Anaicut (alternatively Upper Anicut), also known as Mukkombu, is a dam built on the Kaveri River in the state of Tamil Nadu in southern India. The regulator dam was constructed between 1836 and 1838 by Sir Arthur Cotton, a British irrigation engineer who was inspired by the architectural beauty of Grand Anaicut canal built by Karikala Chola in Kallanai of Thanjavur district in the second century.

Upper Anaicut or Mukkombu is about 18 kilometers (11 mi) west of Trichy and 2 kilometers away from Jeeyapuram at a point where River Kollidam branches out from the main river, Cauvery. It is a picnic spot skirting acres of verdant greenery. The place also has a well-manicured park. Mukkombu is about 685-meter long (2283 foot),

It breaks into two channels at the Upper Anaicut to form the island of Srirangam, which is enclosed in between the delta of Thanjavur (Tanjore), the garden of Tamil Nadu.

== Kollidam ==
Kollidam is the northern arm of the Kavery, which branches off from the main stream about 9 miles west of Tiruchirapalli. for 17 miles it runs parallel to Kaveri and then turns towards and very nearly reunites with it. The island thus formed is called Srirangam and lies in Thiruchirapalli district. The waters of the Kollidam are largely utilized for irrigation.

Built where the Kollidam branches off the Kaveri, the Upper Anicut dam regulates water distribution. By preventing the lower-lying Kollidam from pulling too much water from the main stream, it safeguards the essential irrigation networks of Thanjavur.

On 22–23 August 2018, nine of the forty-five shutters had washed away due to the heavy flow of water and the weakened piers.

== See also ==
- Lower Anaicut
