= Jeeyapuram =

Coordinates: 10.873435°N 78.6044057453°E

Jeeyapuram (also known as Jiyapuram) is a village located 11 km from Tiruchirappalli, India, along the Trichy to Karur national highway.

== Agriculture ==
Jeeyapuram is located next to the Cauvery river, which provides irrigation to the farmlands. The village has many farmlands and farmers by tradition. Paddy field, Banana Tree, Cotton and Black Gram are the major agriculture around Jeeyapuram.

== Temples ==
There are many historical temples around the Village notably Sri Chandrasekhara Swamy Temple and Elambuliamman Temple. Sri samundeeswari temple located at periyakarupur village is a famous and powerful goddess temple.

== Tourist Places ==
Mukkombu is a tourist place, located in a kilometer away from Jeeyapuram. This attracts many people every day.
