= Mannargudi railway station =

Railway station in Tamil Nadu, India

Mannargudi
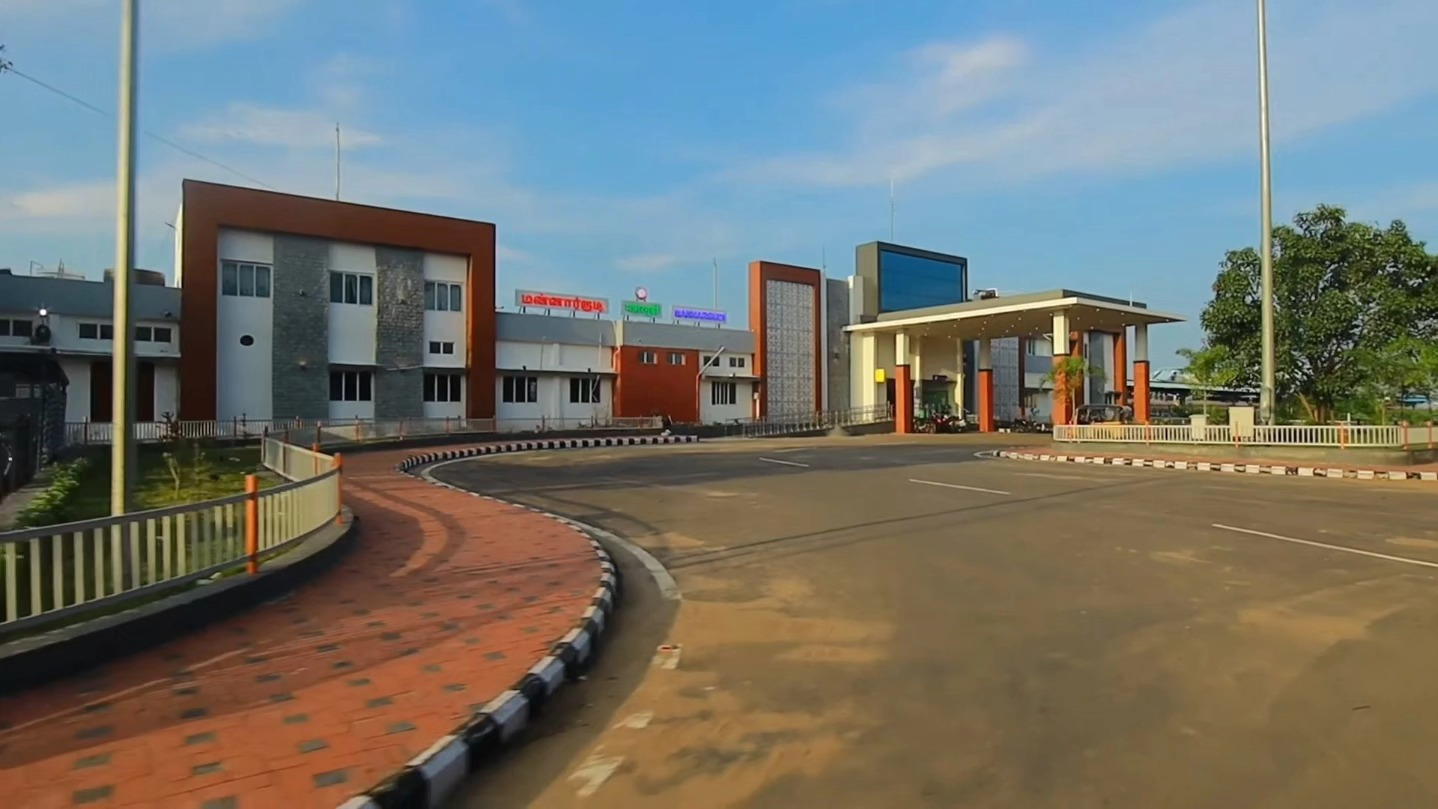
- Front view of Mannargudi Railway Station (MQ)

General information
- Location: JN St, Mannai Nagar, Mannargudi, Thiruvarur Junction, Tamil Nadu; India
- Coordinates: 10.6751°N 79.4531°E
- Elevation: 17 m (56 ft)
- System: Indian Railways station
- Owner: Indian Railways
- Operator: Southern Railway
- Line: Nagapattinam–Tiruchirappalli line
- Platforms: 3
- Tracks: 3
- Connections: Bus stand, taxicab stand, auto rickshaw stand

Construction
- Structure type: Standard (on-ground station)
- Parking: Yes

Other information
- Status: Functioning
- Station code: MQ
- Zone(s): Southern Railway
- Division(s): Tiruchirappalli

History
- Opened: 2011
Location
- Location within Tamil Nadu Location within India

Mannargudi railway station (station code: MQ) is an NSG–5 category Indian railway station in Tiruchirappalli railway division of Southern Railway zone. It is a railway station in Tiruvarur district serving the town of Mannargudi in Tamil Nadu, India. The railway station is located off the JN St, Mannai Nagar of Mannargudi. Electrification works were completed by March 2021

== Location ==
The railway station is located off the JN St, Mannai Nagar of Mannargudi. The nearest bus depot is located in Mannargudi while the nearest airport is situated 86 kilometres (53 mi) away in Tiruchirappalli.

== Projects and development ==
It is one of the 73 stations in Tamil Nadu to be named for upgradation under Amrit Bharat Station Scheme of Indian Railways.

== Important trains ==
List of some important train which originate/ Terminates at Mannargudi railway station

Train number	Train name
16863 / 16864	Bhagat Ki Kothi–Mannargudi Weekly Express
16179 / 16180	Mannai Express
17407 / 17408	Pamani Express
16615 / 16616	Chemmozhi Express
76801 / 76802	Mannargudi - Tiruchchirappalli DEMU
56001 / 56002	Mannargudi - Mayiladuthurai Passenger

Other stations which are directly connected with the Manamadurai Junction, Tiruchirappalli Junction
