= Kumbakonam railway station =

Railway station in Tamil Nadu, India

Kumbakonam
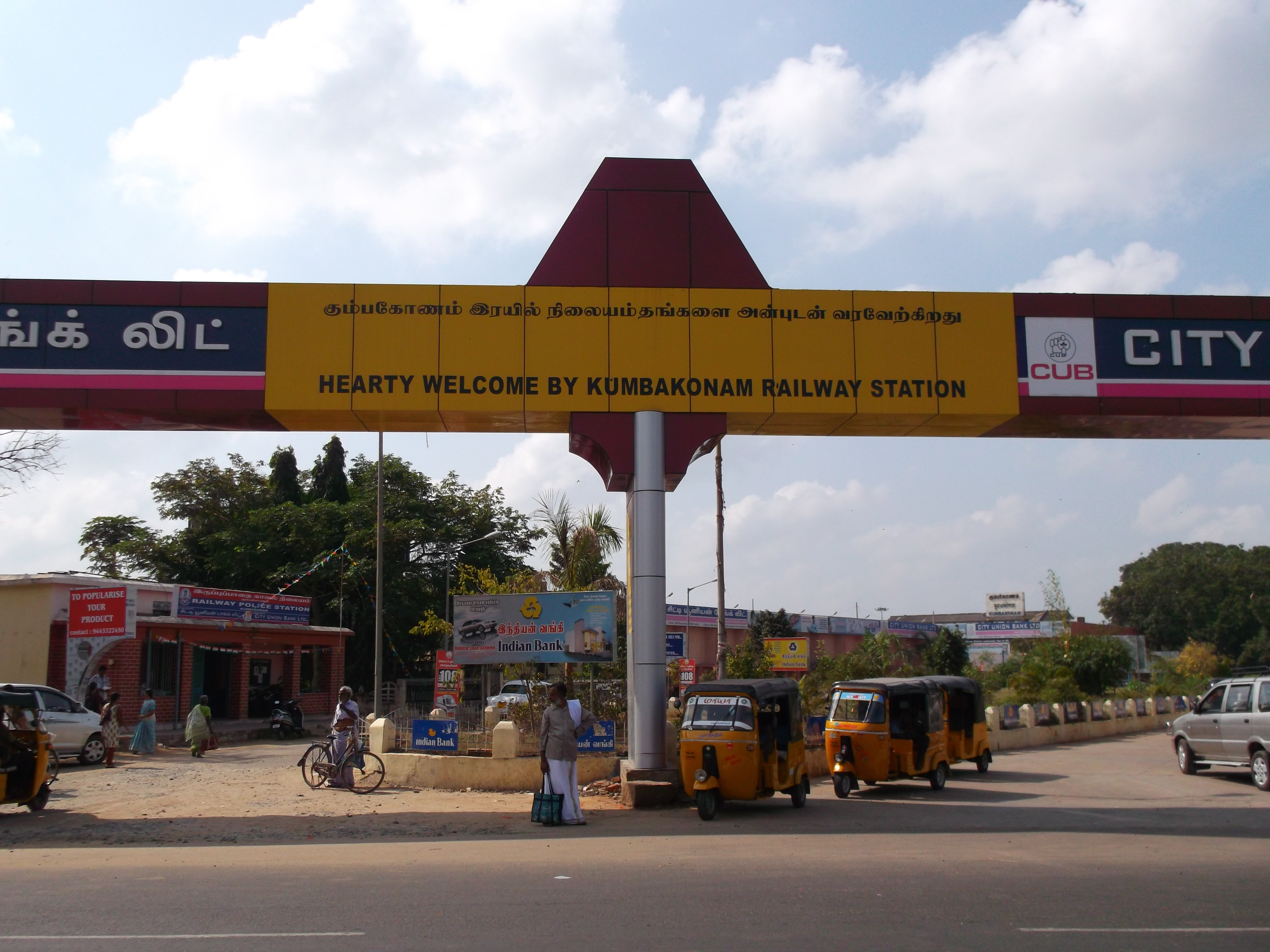
- Kumbakonam Railway Station Main entrance

General information
- Location: Kamaraj Road, Kumbakonam, Thanjavur district, Tamil Nadu; India
- Coordinates: 10.9544°N 79.3894°E
- Elevation: 27 metres (89 ft)
- System: Indian Railways station
- Owner: Indian Railways
- Operator: Southern Railway zone
- Line: Chennai Egmore–Thanjavur main line
- Platforms: 3
- Tracks: 4
- Connections: Auto, taxi stand, bus stand

Construction
- Structure type: Standard
- Parking: Available
- Accessible: Disabled access

Other information
- Status: Functioning
- Station code: KMU
- Zone(s): Southern Railway zone
- Division(s): Tiruchirappalli
- Fare zone: Indian Railways

History
- Opened: February 15, 1877; 149 years ago
- Electrified: 28 January 2020

Passengers
- 10000/per day

Services
50 Express trains
Location
- Location within India Location within Tamil Nadu

Kumbakonam railway station (station code: KMU) is an important Indian railway station in Tiruchirappalli railway division of Southern Railway zone. It is a railway station serving the city of Kumbakonam in Tamil Nadu, India. The station is a part of the Tiruchirappalli railway division of the Southern Railway Zone and connects the city to various parts of the state as well as the rest of the country.The station was declared as cleanest railway station in Tamil Nadu and ranked fifth best in the national level in 2023. It is classified as an " NSG-3 category railway station" in the Trichy railway division of the Southern Railway Zone.It is one of the busiest and most revenue generating stations of the Southern Railway zone after Tiruchirapalli TPJ, Thanjavur TJ, Villupuram VM in Tiruchirapalli division. The Shradha Sethu express connected Kumbakonam to Ayodhya. The well-known Mahamaham tank is one kilometre (5/8 mi) from the railway station.

== History ==
The Kumbakonam railway station opened to passenger service on 15 February 1877, when the then South Indian Railway commenced rail traffic between Thanjavur and Mayavaram (now Mayiladuthurai) for a distance of 70.42 km (43.76 mi).

Swami Vivekananda, on a yatra from Rameswaram, alighted at Kumbakonam station on January 26, 1897, and it was on that day in Kumbakonam that he gave his "Arise, awake and stop not till the goal is reached" speech to spur the people of the nation. A plaque installed by the Railways in the station proclaims the importance of the event.

== Development ==
After serving the railways for decades, the British-era vintage metre-gauge line was scrapped and the last passenger train on those tracks was operated between Kumbakonam and Chennai Egmore on 1 April 2004 following which the broad-gauge tracks were laid.

Gradually, the station came to have several facilities, including water filling for coaches and steam engines to enjoy the status of an important junction. Kumbakonam station developed quickly, and the works were implemented ahead of the Mahamaham festival in 2004.

Now, a total of 50 trains patronise the station every day serving more than 10,000 passengers. Due to the strong patronage by the region's passengers and commuters, Kumbakonam has enjoyed "NSG-3" railway station status. Kumbakonam station is also rated as the fifth-cleanest station in India and the cleanest station in Tamil Nadu, according to has been rated as the cleanest station among the divisional headquarters railway stations survey of major railway stations for cleanliness ranking in 2016 commissioned by the Railways. The Thanjavur District Rail Users' Association honoured the Railway officials and conservancy staff for cleanliness front on the occasion.

In 2022, a Nagpur-based technical consultancy was selected to prepare a plan to improve the Kumbakonam station which has been submitted to the Southern Railway Construction Organization in February 2023.

== Location and layout ==
The railway station is located off the Kamarajar Road, Kumbakonam. The nearest bus depot is located in Kumbakonam while the nearest airport, Tiruchirappalli International Airport, is situated 81 kilometres (50 mi) away in Tiruchirappalli.

== Lines ==
=== Operational lines ===
- BG single line towards Chennai Egmore via Mayiladuthurai Junction, Cuddalore Port Junction, Viluppuram Junction, Chengalpattu Junction and Tambaram.
- BG single line towards Tiruchchirappalli Junction via Thanjavur Junction and Papanasam.

=== Future lines ===
- BG single line towards Vriddhachalam Junction via Jayankondam (survey completed)
- BG single line towards Nidamangalam Junction via Alangudi (survey completed)

== Projects and development ==
It is one of the 73 stations in Tamil Nadu to be named for upgradation under Amrit Bharat Station Scheme of Indian Railways.
