= Srirangam railway station =

Railway station in Tamil Nadu, India

Srirangam

General information
- Location: Tiruchchirapalli, Tamil Nadu; India
- Elevation: 71 metres (233 ft)
- System: Indian Railways station
- Owner: Indian Railways
- Operator: Southern Railway zone
- Platforms: 4
- Tracks: 5

Construction
- Structure type: Standard (on-ground station)
- Parking: Yes
- Cycle facilities: No

Other information
- Status: Active
- Station code: SRGM
- Zone(s): Southern Railway zone
- Division(s): Tiruchirappalli
Location
- Location within India Location within Tamil Nadu

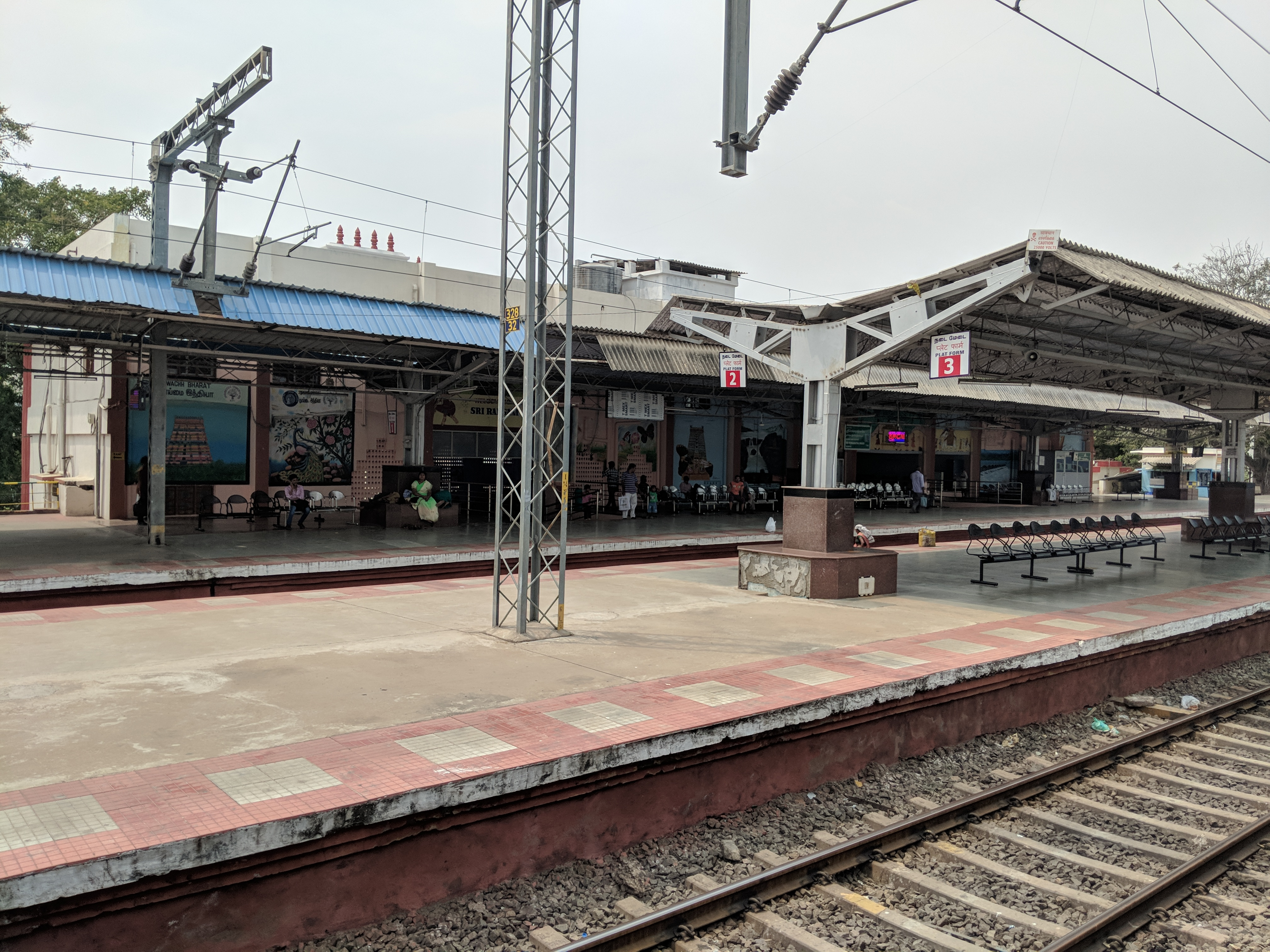
Name board of Sri Rangam Railway station

Srirangam railway station (station code: SRGM) is an NSG–5 category Indian railway station in Tiruchirappalli railway division of Southern Railway zone. It is an important railway station in Tiruchirappalli, Tamil Nadu. It serves the vicinity of Srirangam Area and pilgrims visiting Ranganathaswamy Temple. The station consists of four well sheltered platforms.

== Projects and development ==
It is one of the 73 stations in Tamil Nadu to be named for upgradation under Amrit Bharat Station Scheme of Indian Railways.
