= Trichy railway division =

Railway division of the Southern Railway Zone of India

Tiruchirappalli railway division
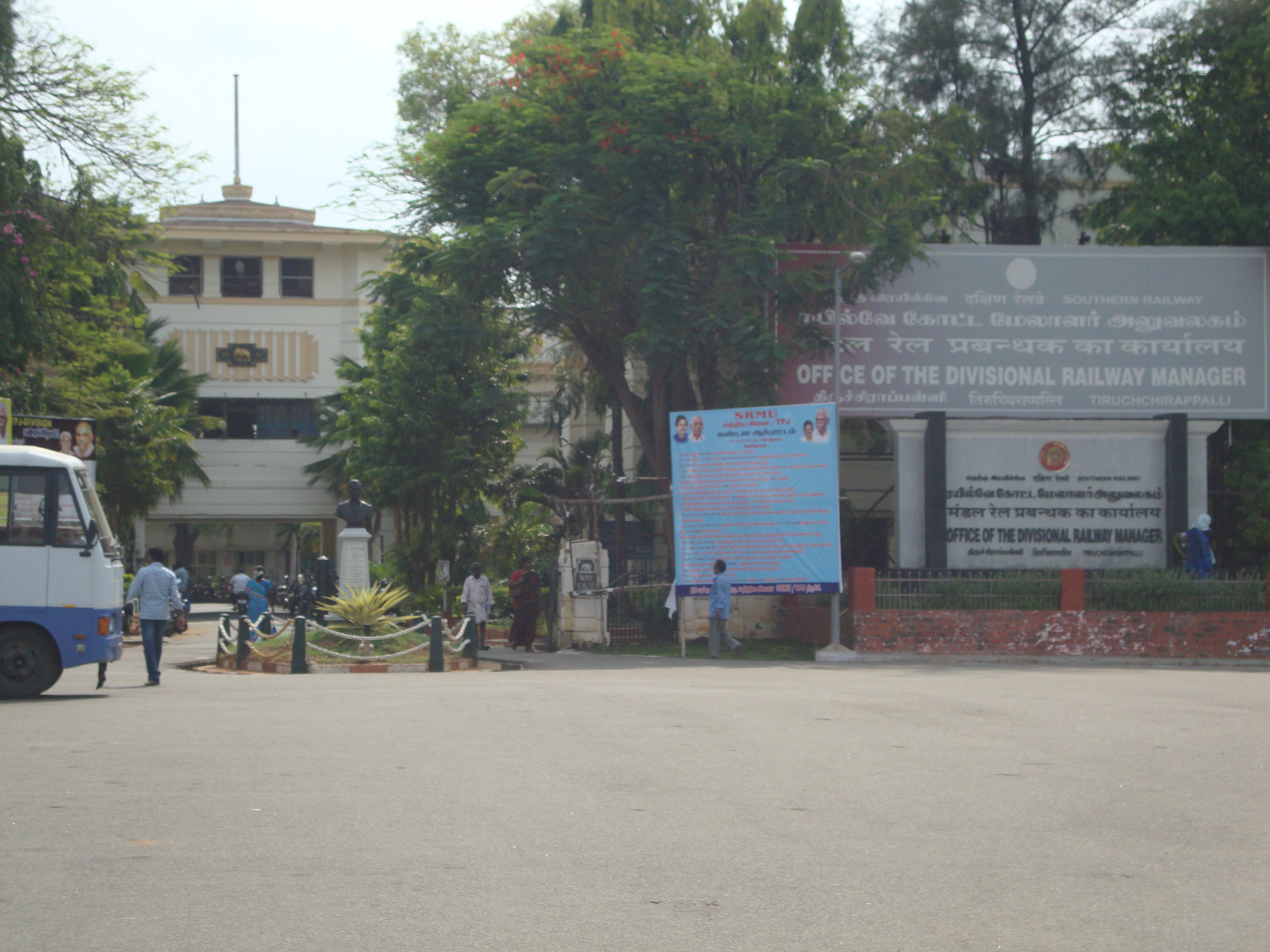
- Office of TPJ Divisional Headquarters

Overview
- Headquarters: Tiruchirappalli, Tamil Nadu, India
- Reporting mark: TPJ
- Locale: Tamil Nadu and Puducherry
- Dates of operation: 16 May 1956; 70 years ago–present
- Predecessor: South Indian Railway

Technical
- Track gauge: 1,676 mm (5 ft 6 in)
- Previous gauge: 1,000 mm (3 ft 3 3/8 in)
- Electrification: 25 kV AC, 50 Hz
- Length: 1,026.55 km (637.87 mi)

Other
- Website: www.sr.indianrailways.gov.in

Tiruchirappalli railway division is one of the six railway divisions under the jurisdiction of Southern Railway zone of the Indian Railways. It has its administrative headquarters located at Tiruchirappalli. It serves most of the districts of delta region and Central Tamil Nadu.

== History and background ==
The history of division dates long back to 1853, when the Great Southern of India Railway Company was established with its headquarters at England and first line was constructed between Negapatnam and Trichinopoly in 1859. Tiruchirappalli railway division was formed while consolidating all other railways of pre-independence era on 16 May 1956. It is the second largest division of the zone having a route length of about 1,026.55 km (637.87 mi), spread over 13 districts of Tamil Nadu. Also this could be the only division in the world that is serving the railway lines of erstwhile South Indian Railway Company and Pondicherry Railway Company developed by the British empire and French empire respectively.

=== Administration ===
The division comes under Southern Railway zone, which is headed by General Manager, A. K. Agarwal. The division is headed by Divisional Railway Manager (DRM), Manish Agarwal. It was also once headed by Manjula Rangarajan, a 1983 batch Indian Railway Accounts Service officer, who became the first woman to head the division in its 150-year history. (Note: The administrators may change from time to time for administrative reasons.) The divisional railway office (DRO) is located close to Tiruchirappalli Junction, which is one of the busiest railway junctions in India and second biggest railway station in Tamil Nadu only next to Chennai Central. Commercial Controller 2464469

== Jurisdiction ==
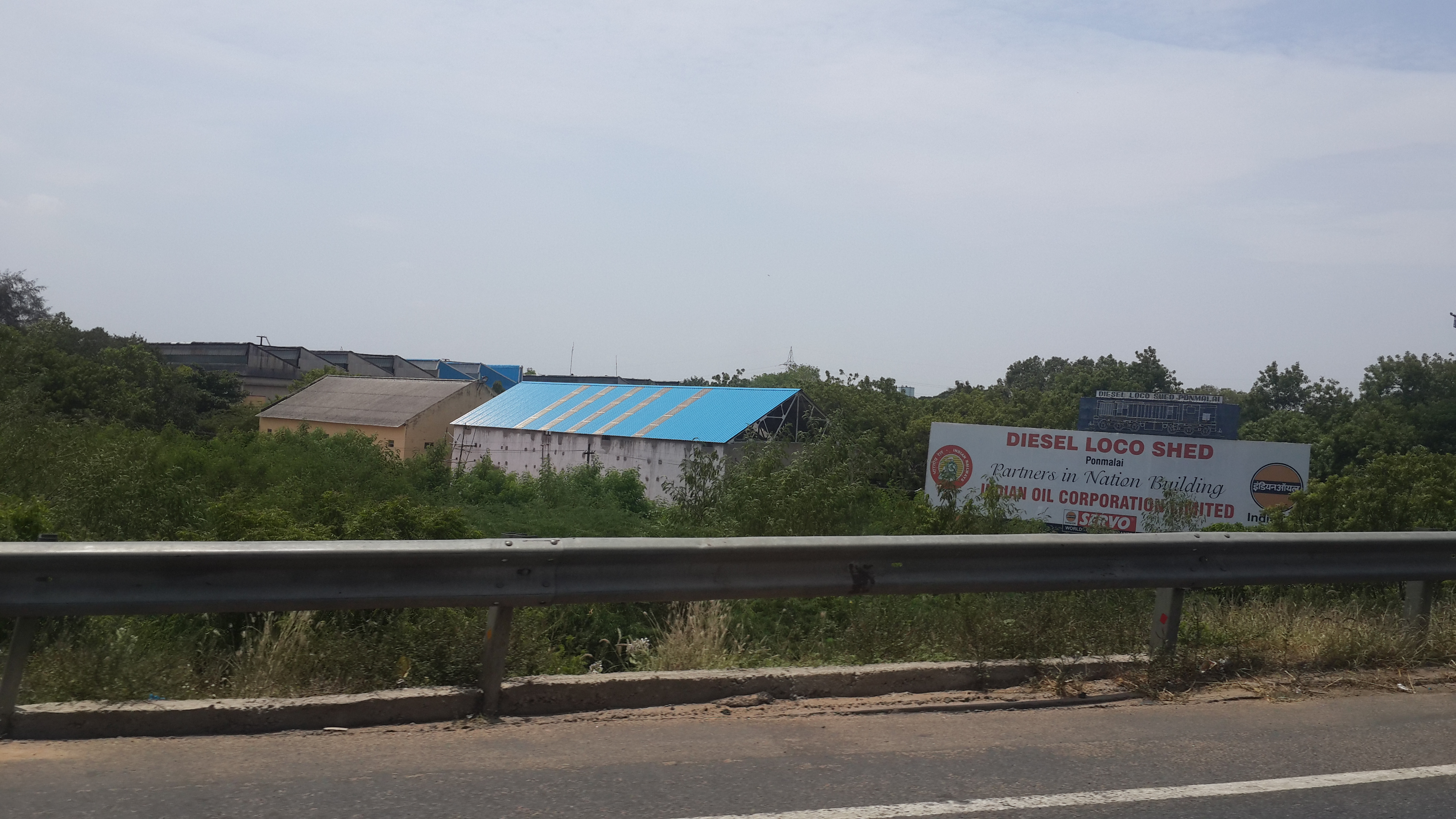
Diesel Loco Shed, Golden Rock

The division spans to Tiruchirappalli, Thanjavur, Nagappattinam, Mayiladuthurai, Cuddalore, Vellore, Tiruvannamalai, Ariyalur, Viluppuram, Tiruvarur, and Perambalur districts of Tamil Nadu state and Union Territory of Puducherry including Karaikal. The total area covered by the division is about 1,026.55 km (637.87 mi), of which BG accounts to 843.26 km (523.98 mi) (including electrified lines) and MG is 183.29 km (113.89 mi), which are all under Gauge conversion.

The 2.8 km (1.7 mi) stretch between Golden Rock and Tiruchirappalli Junction is operating with Triple line, as Both Chord Line and Main Line runs parallel between these stations and for extensive shunting and maintenance purpose due to the proximity of Central Workshop, Diesel loco shed and a newly established electric locomotive trip shed, the entire division has single lines except for Trichy–Viluppuram Section of Chord Line which has been completely Upgraded to Double Line Electrified Section (FEDL).

=== Routes ===
From	To	Line	Gauge	Track	Traction	Chainage from	Chainage to	Distance (in km)	Status
Tiruchirappalli Fort	Tiruchirappalli Junction	Branch Line	BG	Single	Electric	136.43	141.10	5	Active
Viluppuram Junction	Tiruchirappalli Junction	Chord line	BG	Double	Electric	161.60	341.60	180	Active
Viluppuram Junction	Katpadi (Excluding)	Branch line	BG	Single	Electric	0.00	159.10	159	Active
Viluppuram Junction	Puducherry	Branch line	BG	Single	Electric	0.00	37.62	38	Active
Viluppuram Junction	Tiruchirappalli Junction	Main line	BG	Single/Double ^{a}	Electric	162.76	406.80	244	Active
Cuddalore Port Junction	Vridhachalam Junction	Branch line	BG	Single	Electric	0.00	58.27	58	Active
Mayiladuthurai Junction	Karaikkudi Junction	Branch line	BG	Single	Electric	0.00	187.03	187	Active
Tiruturaipundi Junction	Agasthiyampalli-Kodiyarkarai (point Calimere)	Spur Line	BG	Single	Electric	0.00	36.91	37	Active
Thanjavur Junction	Karaikal	Branch line	BG	Single	Electric	0.00	96.46	96	Active
Nidamangalam Junction	Mannargudi	Spur line	BG	Single	Electric	0.00	13.96	14	Active
Nagapattinam Junction	Velankanni	Spur line	BG	Single	Electric	0.00	10.40	10	Active
Peralam	Karaikal	Branch line	BG	Single	Electric	0.00	-	23.06	Active
Mayiladuthurai Junction	Taragambadi (trabquebar)	Spur line	MG	Single	Diesel	0.00	-	29.20	Under Gauge Conversion

^a Doubline line is available between Tiruchirappalli Junction and Thanjavur Junction only.

== List of railway stations and towns ==
The list includes the stations under the Trichy railway division and their station category.

Classification based on old nomenclature
Category of station	No. of stations	Names of stations
A-1 Category	1	Tiruchirappalli Junction
A Category	4	Thanjavur Junction, Viluppuram Junction, Kumbakonam, Mayiladuthurai Junction
B Category	4	Nagapattinam Junction, Puducherry, Vriddhachalam Junction, Ariyalur
C Category (Suburban station)	–	–
D Category	6	Thiruvarur Junction, Mannargudi, Velankanni, Srirangam, Chidambaram, Nidamangalam Junction
E Category	1	Karaikal
F Category; Halt Station	–	–
Total	–	–

Classification based on new nomenclature
Category of station	No. of stations	Names of stations
NSG-1	0	–
NSG-2	1	Tiruchirappalli Junction railway station
NSG-3	2	Thanjavur Junction, Viluppuram Junction
NSG-4	4	Kumbakonam, Mayiladuthurai Junction, Nagapattinam Junction, Puducherry
NSG-5	20	Vriddhachalam Junction, Thiruvarur Junction, Mannargudi, Velankanni, Ariyalur, Srirangam, Chidambaram, Nidamangalam Junction, Karaikal, Tirukkovilur, Tiruvannamalai, Vellore Cantonment, Tiruchirappalli Fort, Nagore, Lalgudi, Tiruverumbur, Papanasam, Sirkazhi, Cuddalore Port Junction, Thirupadiripuliyur.
NSG-6	67	Turinjapuram, Agastiampalli, Panruti, Aduturai, Budalur, Polur, Vaithisvarankoil, Pennadam, Kutralam, Peralam, Tiruchchirappalli town, Chinnababu samudram, Sendurai, Mathur, Ponmalai (golden rock), Arni road, Adirampattinam, Koradacheri, Ulundurpet, Pullambadi, Arantangi, Pattukottai, Tiruturaipundi Junction, Kannamangalam, Kallakkudi palanganatham, Vadalur, Nellikuppam, Neyveli, Tiruvennainallur road, Alakkudi, Peravuruni, Saliyamangalam, Kizhvelur, Kurinjipadi, Parikkal, Valadi, Thiruthuraiyur, Pandaravadai, Kulikarai, Melpattambakkam, Tillaivilagam, Kollidam, Puvanur, Ichchangadu, Sundaraperumal Koil, Sillakkudi, Kandambakkam, Alapakam, Kille, Anandatandavapuram, Solagampatti, Tirunelikaval, Talanallur, Titte, Nannilam, Serndanur, Uttangal mangalam, Ottakovil, Kallagam, Periyakottai, Ayingudi, Puduchattiram, Kaniyambadi, Mambalapattu, Venkatesapuram, Agaram sibbandi, Tandarai.
SG-1, SG-2, SG-3	0	–
HG-1	1	Villiyanur
HG-2	14	Manjattidal, Vriddhachalam town, Tiruchchirappalli palakarai, Valavanur, Tiruvidaimarudur, Aiyanapuram, Darasuram, Ammapet, Parangipettai, Velippalaiyam, Swamimalai, Nidur, Pichchandar Koil, Velore town.
HG-3	37	Valaramanikkam, Muthupettai, Tirunageswaram, Ichchangadu, Vellur, Narasinganpet, Onnupuram, Kuthur, Sikkal, Adhichchanur, Koyilvenni, Andanappettai, Capper quarry, Adiyakkamangalam, Tondamanpatti, Tirumalairayan Pattinam, Pasupathikoil, Kudikadu, Sedarampattu, Ayyampet, Tirumathikunnam, Alattambadi, Vallampadugai, Manali, Mangudi, Mavur road, Punthottam, Ammanur, Andampallam, Ayandur, Kandanur puduvayal, Kattur, Madimangalam, Ottankadu, Pennathur, Uthamar kovil, Varakalpattu.
Unclassified/Closed	15	Teli, Mugaiyur, Velanandal, Meppuliyur, Kullanchavadi, Malliyam, Manganallur, Mandurai, Kadambankulam, Mariamman Koil, Kodikkalpalayam, Virkudi, Pandi, Kariyapattinam, Merpanaikkadu
Total	161	–

== Operations ==
=== Passenger services ===
The division involves in operating about 150 trains per day, of which the 178 km (111 mi) stretch chord line experiences heaviest traffic handling about 30 passenger and 56 express trains passing through everyday in addition to goods train, particularly during night.

The division operates about 30 Passenger Reservation System (PRS) centers which includes six post offices at Villianur, Tiruvettipuram, Peravurani, Muthupet, Srirangam, and Ponmalai under the 1,000 PRS scheme, as a part of improving passenger amenities. At the headquarters station, plasma screen electronic display boards, electronic train arrival/departure boards were installed along with a renovated linen room and Integrated Security System to enhance security.

The division became the first in the Southern Railway zone to install multi-coloured LED coach indication boards at Kumbakonam railway station during November 2013 and at Tiruchirappalli junction during January 2014, for Platform.no.1 alone which is supposed to be extended till Platform no.5 and also at about 17 other stations including Viluppuram Junction, Puducherry, Thanjavur Junction, Mayiladuthurai Junction and Mannargudi within the division.

=== Freight services ===
The division has provided team tracks for a number of Industrial establishments adjoining the railway lines utilising the nearby railway stations for their logistics and transports such as Central Workshop (Golden Rock), Cement and gypsum factories (Trichy, Perambalur and Ariyalur), Lignite industries (Neyveli), Sugar factories (Viluppuram and Vridhachalam), FCI and Civil supplies (Cauvery delta districts) also BHEL (Tiruverumbur), and ports (Cuddalore and Karaikal).

== Performance ==
=== Revenue ===
The division posted a decent earning of ₹733.10 crore (US$76 million) during the financial year during 2012–2013 . It carried 42.5 million passenger and earned ₹233.15 crore (US$24 million) from regular and festival special trains and ₹449.92 crore (US$47 million), by transporting 9,000,000 metric tons (8,900,000 long tons; 9,900,000 short tons) of freight, of which karaikal port alone contributes about 40% of the revenue.

=== Awards ===
The division won the overall efficiency medical shield, cleanliness shield and electrical conservation shield for 2012–2013 at the zonal level, in addition to the overall safety shield at the Annual Safety Week Celebrations held at Zonal Railway Training Institute.

== Towns and places of interest ==
On the chord line were Srirangam, Ariyalur, Vridhachalam Jn and Viluppuram Junction. On the main line and branch lines that traverses through delta districts has a lot of greenery in the form of agriculture and towns of religious importance like Thanjavur, Thiruvarur, Kumbakonam, Mayiladuthurai, Sirkazhi, Chidambaram, Cuddalore, Nagore, Velankanni, Tirunallar.

== Current projects ==
S.No	Section			Nature of work	Status
S.No	From	Via	To	Nature of work	Status
1	Salem Junction	Namakkal → Perambalur → Ariyalur → Jayankondam → Gangaikondacholapuram → Mayiladuthurai → Tirunallar	Karaikal	New line	Survey completed
2	Nagapattinam Junction	Tirukuvalai	Tiruturaipundi Junction	New line (Note: For all new lines, the route and its length are determined only after the completion of the work, since the planned routes may undergo unexpected changes due to various social and economic conditions.)	In progress
3	Mannargudi	TBA	Pattukkottai	New line	In progress
4	Thanjavur Junction		Pattukkottai	New line	In Progress
5	Thanjavur Junction		Ariyalur	New line	Survey completed
6	Mayiladuthurai Junction	Tarangambadi → Tirunallar	Karaikal	Gauge conversion plus new line extension	Survey completed
7	Kumbakonam	Jayankondam	Virudhachalam Junction	New Line	Survey Completed

== Employees ==
The division has a total workforce of about 11,430 in various ranks.

=== Welfare ===
==== Healthcare ====
The division manages one Divisional Railway Hospital, one Sub-divisional Railway Hospital and seven Health Units/Polyclinics. The Divisional Railway Hospital is at Golden Rock, which was established by the then South Indian Railway Company in 1927, caters exclusively to railway staff of the entire division, has about 297 beds including 100 beds in the newly opened surgical ward. Apart from DRH, Golden Rock, the division has 25-bed Sub-divisional Hospital at Viluppuram and eight Railway Health Units at Tiruchirappalli Junction, Tiruchirappalli Fort, Srirangam, Vriddhachalam, Tiruvannamalai, Thanjavur, Mayiladuthurai and Tiruvarur.

==== Education ====
The division oversees the management of railway schools within its jurisdictional limit at Tiruchirappalli (SRWWO Matriculation School at Kallukuzhi and RMHSS/GOC) and Viluppuram (RMHSS/VM).

== Security ==
=== Railway Protection Force (RPF) ===
About 275 security personnels including 30 commandos, headed by Divisional Security Commissioner, oversee the security arrangements on day-to-day basis round the clock for the entire division which includes protecting railway infrastructure, escorting passengers in trains and operations in all railway stations. Before being put into active service, all security personnel undergo training at Zonal RPF Training Center at Khajamalai, Tiruchirapalli.

=== Government Railway Police (GRP) ===
Apart from RPF, the Government Railway Police (GRP), a unit of Tamil Nadu Police also assists in civil and criminal issues at railway stations along with passenger safety. This unit was first established in 1932 with Trichy as its headquarters. Later in 1981, the unit was bifurcated and the headquarters was moved to Chennai. This unit has about 1400 personnel, headed by a Superintendent of Police. The jurisdictional limit starts from Viluppuram in the north to Kuzhithurai railway station in the south and Karaikal in the east to Palani in the west. It has about 16 police stations and 14 out-posts along with mobile units in Nellai Express and Rameswaram Express.

== See also ==
- Southern Railway zone
- Indian Railways
- Railway Protection Force
- Tamil Nadu Police
