= Kollidam, Mayiladuthurai =

Kollidam Koḷḷiṭam
- Town
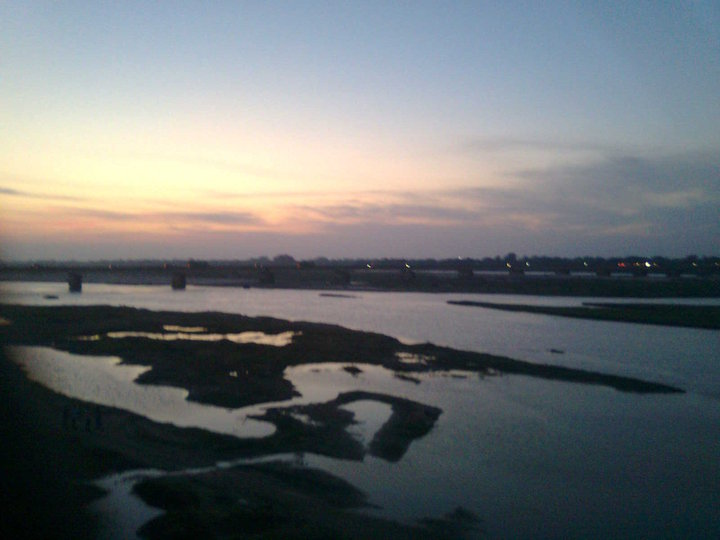
- Kollidam river

- Location in Tamil Nadu, India
- Coordinates: 11.33065°N 79.72036°E
- Country: India
- State: Tamil Nadu
- District: Mayiladuthurai
- Time zone: UTC+5:30 (IST)
- PIN: 609102
- Telephone code: 91 4364
- Vehicle registration: TN-82

Kollidam (also spelled Koḷḷiṭam in Tamil), formerly known as Coleroon is a panchayat town and headquarters of the Kollidam revenue block in the Mayiladuthurai district, in the Indian state of Tamil Nadu. The name derived from the settlement named after the Kollidam River, the northern distributary of the river Cauvery.

This place is on the border of the Mayiladuthurai district and Cuddalore district. The town is located 7km from the mouth of river Bay of Bengal.

== Etymology ==
The name Kollidam is derived from the Kollidam River, which flows adjacent to the settlement. The town is understood to have developed near the river crossing and irrigation point, and was subsequently named after the watercourse.

== Administration ==
Kollidam functions as a panchayat town within the Kollidam Block, an administrative division consisting of multiple village panchayats. It serves as the local center for revenue, rural development, and administrative services.

== Geography ==
The panchayat town is located in the Cauvery delta region and agriculture is the main occupation. Kollidam is located at a distance of 235 km from Chennai, and 31 km from Mayladuthurai. The language being spoken is Tamil. The nearest railway station is Kollidam railway station.

== See also ==
- Kollidam railway station
