= Tiruvannamalai railway station =

Railway station in Tamil Nadu, India

Tiruvannamalai
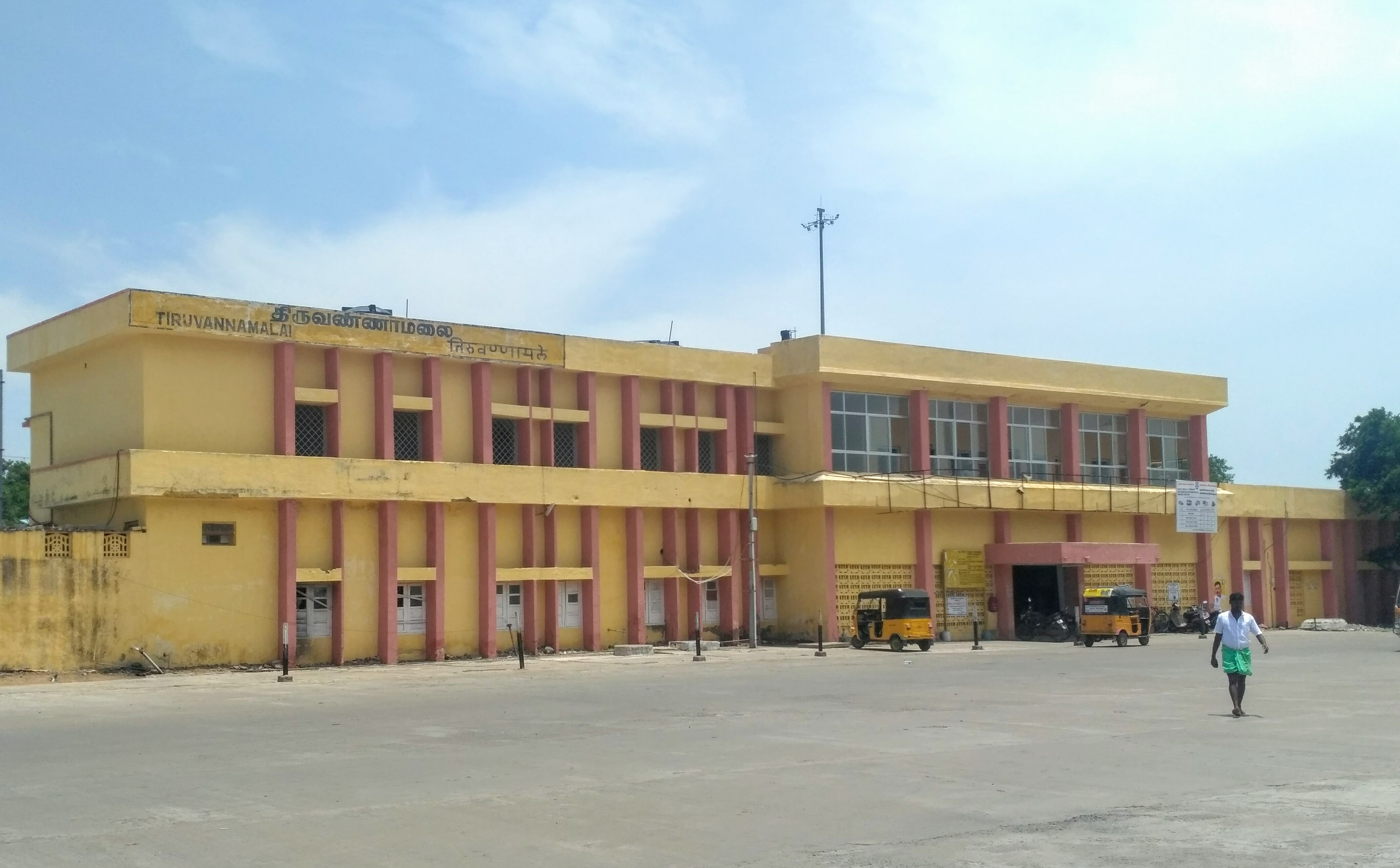

General information
- Location: Railway station road (off Bengaluru-Pondicherry high road), Tiruvannamalai- 2, Tamil Nadu, India – 606 602
- Coordinates: 12.2385°N 79.0777°E
- Elevation: 213 m (699 ft)
- System: Express train and Passenger train station
- Owner: Ministry of Railways (India)
- Operator: Indian Railways
- Line: Katpadi–Villupuram line
- Platforms: 3 Side platforms
- Tracks: 4
- Connections: Taxi, Bus

Construction
- Structure type: At–grade
- Parking: Available
- Cycle facilities: Available

Other information
- Status: Active
- Station code: TNM
- Zone(s): Southern Railway zone
- Division(s): Tiruchirappalli
- Fare zone: Southern Railway zone
Location
- Location within India Location within Tamil Nadu

Tiruvannamalai railway station (station code: TNM) is an NSG–5 category Indian railway station in Tiruchirappalli railway division of Southern Railway zone. It is a station of the Indian Railways system, station code TNM. It serves the city of Tiruvannamalai in the Indian state of Tamil Nadu. The most notable place is the Annamalaiyar Temple. Being built in the 700 AD, the station close to the temple.

== Administration ==
The station falls under the jurisdiction of Tiruchirappalli railway division in Southern Railway zone of Indian Railways.

== Lines ==
It is on the line connecting Katpadi Junction and Viluppuram Junction.

== Location ==
This railway station is located off Bengaluru-Pondicherry road.

== Projects and development ==
It is one of the 73 stations in Tamil Nadu to be named for upgradation under Amrit Bharat Station Scheme of Indian Railways. This railways station is at an elevation of 699 ft. This railway station consists of three platforms and four railway tracks. This railway station is electrified.
