= Lower Anaicut =

Dam in Tamil Nadu, India

Coordinates: 11°8′20″N 79°27′6″E

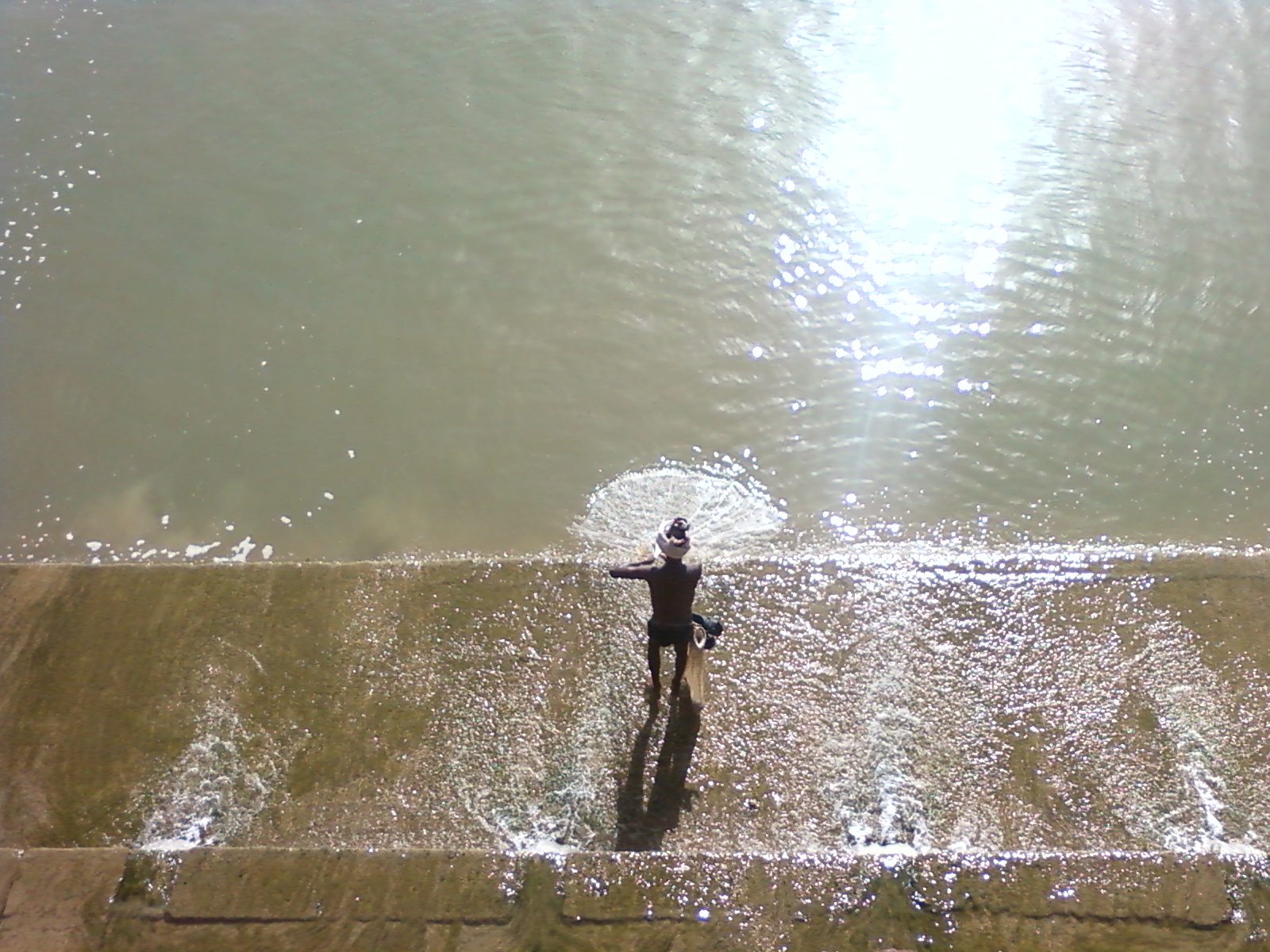
Fishing in the Lower Anaicut

The Lower Anaicut or Anaikkarai is a dam and bridge built on the Kollidam (the northern distributary of Kaveri River) in the Indian state of Tamil Nadu.

It was built in 1902 by the colonial administration of the Madras Presidency for irrigating the erstwhile South Arcot district. Stones from the ruins of Gangaikonda Cholapuram were used to construct the dam. It is situated about 70 miles below the Upper Anaicut and 25 km from Kumbakonam. It has a shutter and sluice system that distributes the Kollidam water into various waterways. At Lower Anaicut, the Kollidam branches off into Manniar and Uppanai.

Lower Anaicut is the terminal barrage across the Kaveri river system for sharing the river water per Cauvery Water Dispute Tribunal. 10 tmcft water is allocated for the minimum environmental flows in the down stream of the Lower Anaicut. Another 4 tmcft is identified as unavoidable wastage to the sea from the Lower Anaicut/river basin. If Tamil Nadu is unable to use the available Kaveri waters and water over flows downstream of Lower Anaicut in excess of 14 tmcft, the excess water gone to sea is considered as part of the utilisable water under the share of Tamil Nadu per the Kaveri Water Dispute Tribunal.
