= Kollidam block =

Kollidam block is a revenue block in the Sirkazhi taluk of Mayiladuthurai district, Tamil Nadu, India. The headquarters of the block is Kollidam. There are a total of 38 panchayat villages in this block. It is located 32 km towards North from District headquarters Mayiladuthurai. It is a Block headquarter.
