= Lalgudi railway station =

Railway station in Tamil Nadu, India

Lalgudi
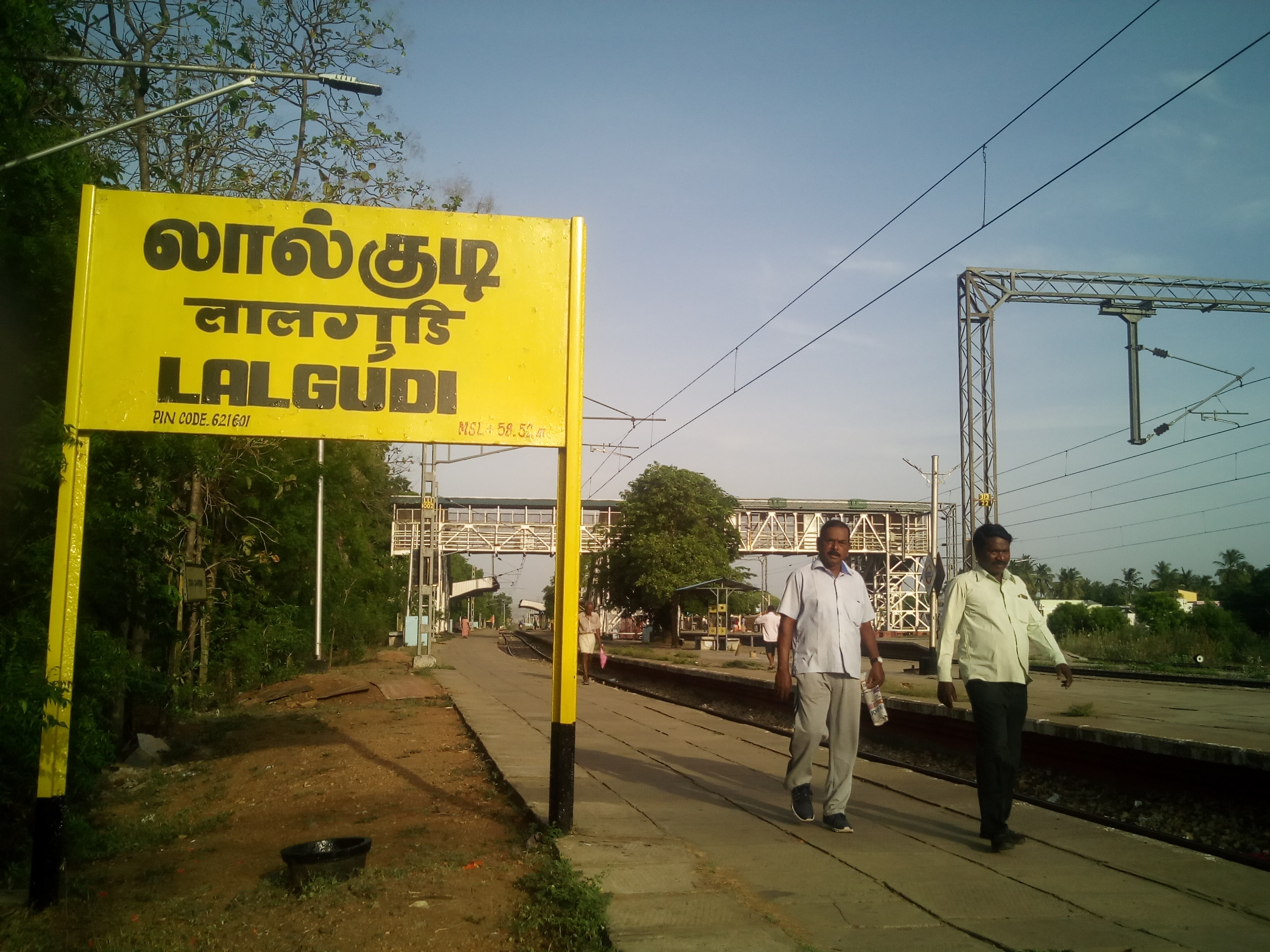

General information
- Location: Lalgudi, Tamil Nadu; India
- Coordinates: 10.8756°N 78.8152°E
- Elevation: 60 metres (200 ft)
- System: Indian Railways station
- Owner: Indian Railways
- Operator: Southern Railway
- Platforms: 3
- Tracks: 4

Construction
- Structure type: Standard (on-ground station)
- Parking: No
- Cycle facilities: No

Other information
- Status: Double electric line
- Station code: LLI
- Zone(s): Southern Railway
- Division(s): Tiruchirappalli
Location
- Location within India Location within Tamil Nadu

Lalgudi railway station (station code: LLI) is an NSG–5 category Indian railway station in Tiruchirappalli railway division of Southern Railway zone. It is a small railway station in Lalgudi, Tiruchirappalli district, Tamil Nadu. The station consists of two platforms. The platforms are not well sheltered. It lacks many facilities including water and sanitation.

== Projects and development ==
It is one of the 73 stations in Tamil Nadu to be upgraded under the Amrit Bharat Station Scheme.
