= Kallukuzhi =

Kallakuzhi is a neighbourhood of the city of Tiruchirappalli in Tamil Nadu, India. It is located in the heart of the city.
