= Sirkazhi railway station =

Railway station in Tamil Nadu, India

Sirkazhi

General information
- Location: NH 45A, Sirkazhi, Mayiladuthurai district, Tamil Nadu; India
- Coordinates: 11.2414°N 79.7275°E
- Elevation: 6 metres (20 ft)
- System: Indian Railways station
- Owner: Indian Railways
- Operator: Southern Railway zone
- Line: Chennai Egmore–Thanjavur main line
- Platforms: 2
- Tracks: 3
- Connections: Bus stand, Taxicab stand, Auto rickshaw stand

Construction
- Structure type: Standard (on ground station)
- Parking: Available
- Accessible: Yes

Other information
- Status: Functioning
- Station code: SY
- Zone(s): Southern Railway zone
- Division(s): Tiruchirappalli
- Fare zone: Indian Railways

History
- Electrified: 28 January 2020
Location
- Location within Tamil Nadu Location within India

Sirkazhi railway station (station code: SY) is an NSG–5 category Indian railway station in Tiruchirappalli railway division of Southern Railway zone. It is a railway station serving Sirkazhi, a municipal town and taluk headquarters, in Mayiladuthurai district of the Indian state of Tamil Nadu. The station lies on the main line.
