= Kollidam River =

River in Tamil Nadu, India

Coordinates: 11°21′35″N 79°49′46″E

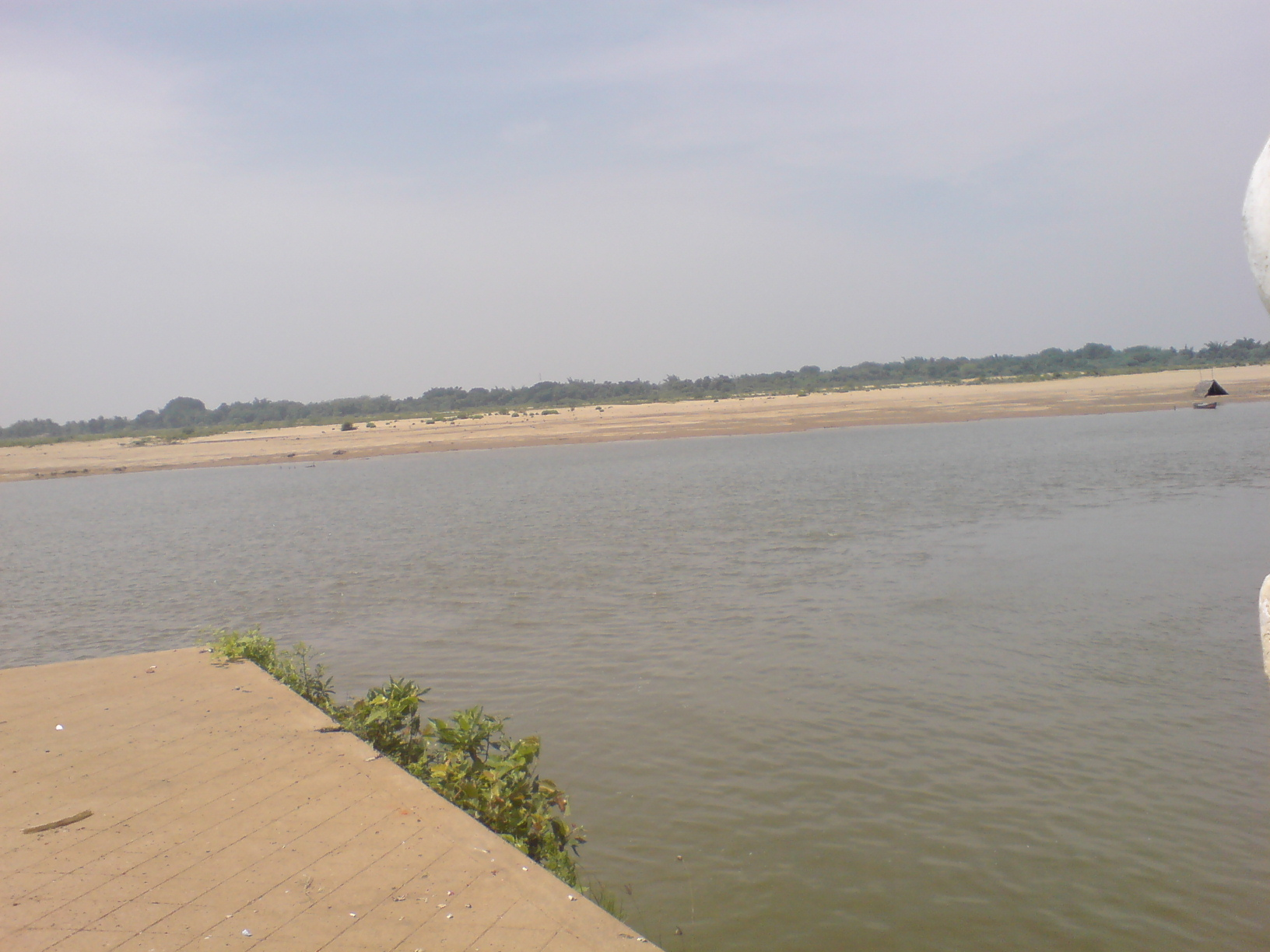
Kollidam River

The Kollidam (referred to as Coleroon in Colonial English) is a river in southeastern India. The Kollidam is the northern distributary of the Cauvery River as it flows through the delta districts. It splits from the main branch of the Cauvery River at the island of Srirangam and flows eastward into the Bay of Bengal near Kollidam block, Pazhaiyar, Mayiladuthurai district. The distribution system in Kollidam lies at Lower Anaicut which is an island of river Kollidam.

The surplus and floodwater from the Mettur Dam are diverted into the Kollidam River at Upper Anaicut by the Public Works Department (PWD) to ensure safe discharge into the Bay of Bengal. This measure helps manage excess water flow and reduces the risk of flooding in surrounding areas.
