= Nidamangalam Junction railway station =

Junction railway station serving Needamangalam in Tamil Nadu, India

Nidamangalam Junction
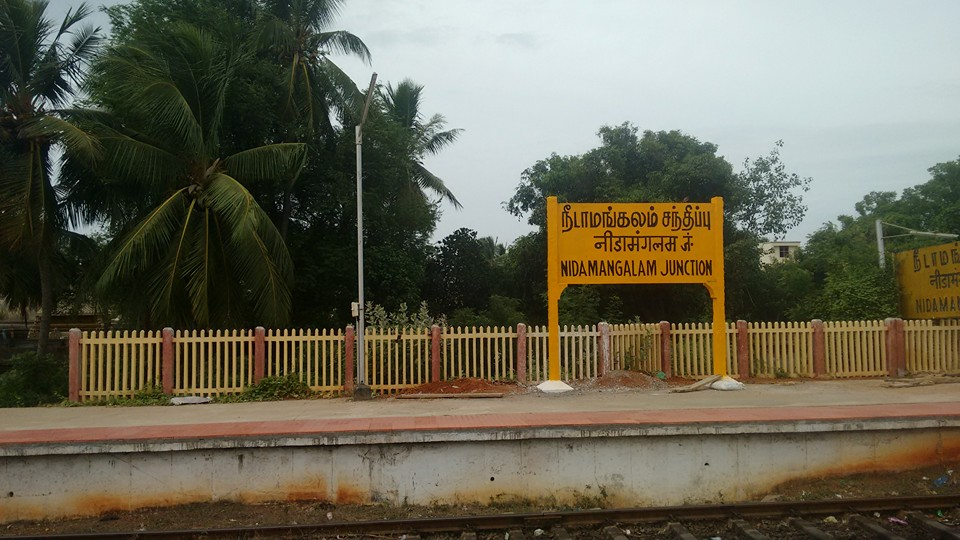

General information
- Location: NH 67, Nidamangalam, Needamangalam, Tiruvarur, Tamil Nadu; India
- Coordinates: 10.7740°N 79.4121°E
- Elevation: 25 m (82 ft)
- System: Indian Railways station
- Owner: Indian Railways
- Operator: Southern Railway zone
- Lines: Nagapattinam–Tiruchirappalli line Nidamangalam–Mannargudi line
- Platforms: 3
- Tracks: 3
- Connections: Bus stand, taxicab stand, auto rickshaw stand

Construction
- Structure type: Standard (on-ground station)
- Parking: Yes

Other information
- Status: Functioning
- Station code: NMJ
- Zone(s): Southern Railway zone
- Division(s): Tiruchirappalli

History
- Opened: Yes
Route map
Location
- Location within Tamil Nadu

Nidamangalam Junction (station code: NMJ) is an NSG–5 category Indian railway station in Tiruchirappalli railway division of Southern Railway zone. It is a junction railway station serving Needamangalam in Tamil Nadu, India.

== Location and layout ==
The railway station is located off the NH 67, Nidamangalam junction of Needamangalam, while the nearest airport is situated 80 kilometres (50 mi) away in Tiruchirappalli.

== Lines ==
The station connects Chennai Egmore, Thanjavur Junction, Tiruchchirappalli Junction, Nagapattinam Junction, Karaikkudi Junction, Mayiladuthurai Junction, Thiruvarur Junction, Rameswaram, etc.

- BG single line towards Nagapattinam Junction via Koradacheri.
- BG single line towards Thanjavur Junction via Saliyamangalam.
- BG single line towards Mannargudi
