= Thanjavur Junction railway station =

Railway station in Tamil Nadu, India

Thanjavur Junction Tanjore Junction
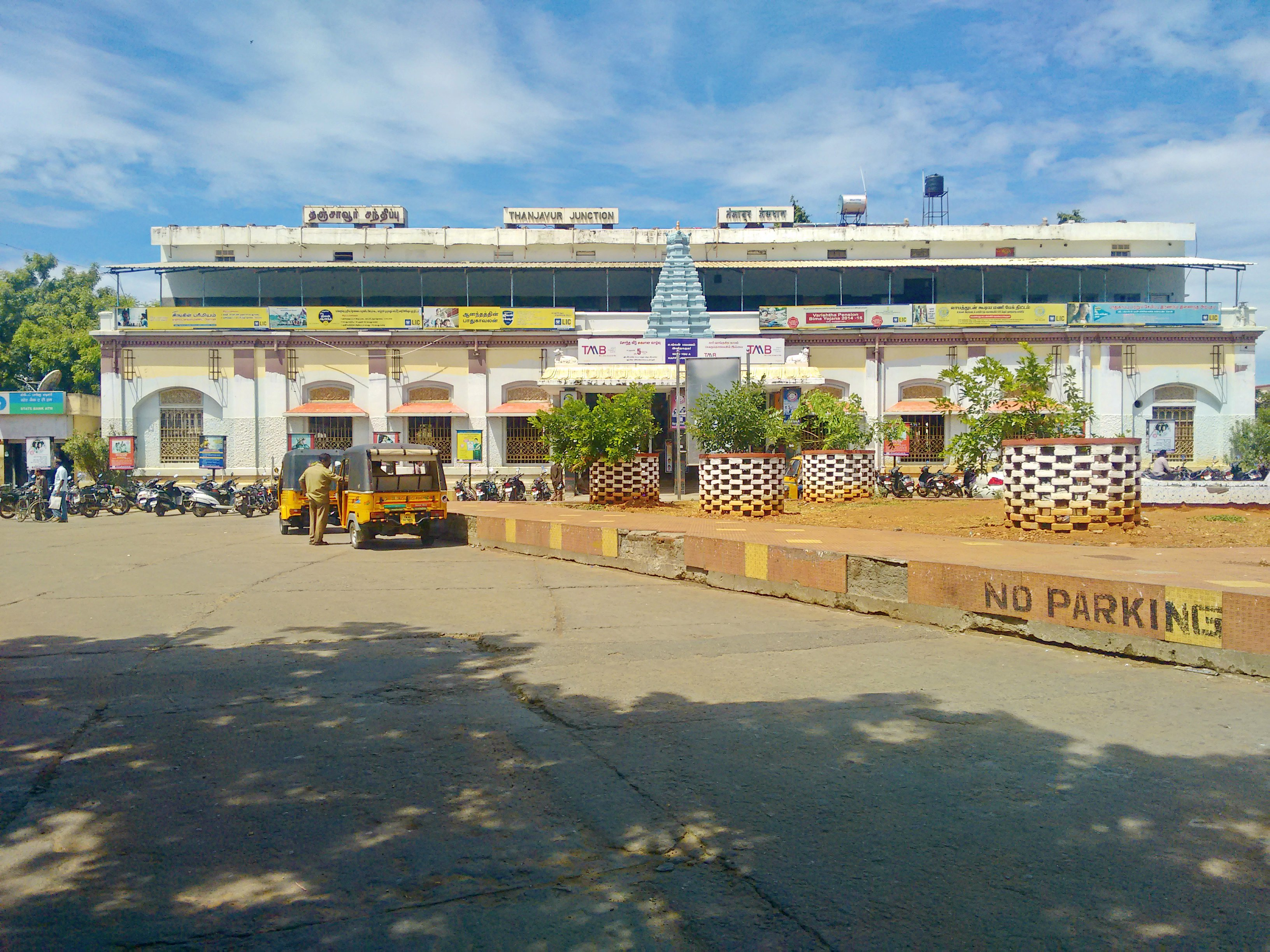
- Entrance of Thanjavur railway station

General information
- Location: Gandhiji Road, Thanjavur-1, Tamil Nadu; India
- Coordinates: 10°46′41″N 79°08′17″E
- Elevation: 60 metres (200 ft)
- System: Indian Railways station
- Owner: Indian Railways
- Operator: Southern Railway zone
- Lines: Chennai Egmore–Thanjavur main line Tiruchirappalli–Nagapattinam line
- Platforms: 5
- Tracks: 7

Construction
- Structure type: Standard on ground
- Parking: Yes
- Cycle facilities: Yes
- Accessible: Disabled access

Other information
- Status: Functioning
- Station code: TJ
- Division(s): Tiruchirappalli

History
- Electrified: 28 January 2020
Route map
Location
- Location within Tamil Nadu Location within India

Thanjavur Junction (station code: TJ) is an NSG–3 category Indian railway station in Tiruchirappalli railway division of Southern Railway zone. It is a junction railway station in Thanjavur district in the Indian state of Tamil Nadu and serves Thanjavur, earlier known as Tanjore.

== History ==
Thanjavur is located on the "main line" of the railway system in the Coromandel coast connecting Chennai with Tiruchirappalli via Villupuram, Cuddalore, Chidambaram, Mayiladuthurai, Kumbakonam and Thanjavur junction. In 1861 the Great Southern of India Railway (GSIR) built the 125 km (78 mi)-long 5 ft 6 in (1,676 mm) broad gauge line between Nagapattinam and Tiruchirapalli (then known as Trichinopoly) and the line was opened to traffic next year. It was a new development south of Chennai. After South Indian Railway Company took over GSIR in 1874, the Nagapattinam–Tiruchirapalli line was converted to 1,000 mm (3 ft 3 3/8 in)-wide metre gauge in 1875.

The South India Railway Company laid a 715 km (444 mi)-long metre gauge trunk line from Chennai to Tuticorin via Cuddalore, Kumbakonam and Thanjavur in 1880. The 82.67 km (51 mi) long Tindivanam–Cuddalore Port (then known as Cuddalore Junction) sector, 27.60 km (17 mi) long Cuddalore Port–Porto Novo sector, 19.71 km (12 mi) long Shyali–Mayiladuthurai sector and 70.42 km (44 mi) long Mayiladuthurai–Thanjavur sector were opened in 1877, connecting Tindivanam to the already opened Tiruchirappalli–Nagapattinam line.

Three rail lines branch for Thanjavur Junction:

1. Towards north for Mayiladuthurai Junction.
2. Towards east for Nidamangalam Junction.
3. Towards west for Tiruchirappalli Junction.

== Accident ==
On 8-1-1958 at about 6:25 hours while backing No. 101 Madras-Egmore–Dhanushkodi Boat Mail on the platform line of Tanjore Junction, its rear portion bumped against the rear portion of No 112 Tenkasi Passenger which was stationary on the other end of this platform, having arrived earlier.

== Gauge conversion ==
The Cuddalore Port–Vadalur sector was converted in 2003. After conversion work of the Thanjavur–Tiruvarur broad-gauge section was opened to traffic in 2006 and Tiruvarur–Nagore section in 2010.

== Electrification ==
New electrification survey in 2012–13 had been sanctioned in the Railway budget for the Karaikkal/Karaikkal Port–Nagapattinam-Thiruvarur-Needamangalam-Thanjavur–Tiruchirappalli and Nagapattinam–Velankanni sectors. The Electrification of Tiruchirappalli-Thanjavur-Kumbakonam-Mayiladuthurai section was completed in the end of 2020 and it was commissioned on 14 February 2021.

== Projects and development ==
It is one of the 73 stations in Tamil Nadu to be named for upgradation under Amrit Bharat Station Scheme of Indian Railways.

Preceding station	Indian Railways	Following station
Titte towards	Southern Railway zone Chennai–Thanjavur line	Terminus
Mariamman Koil towards	Southern Railway zone Tiruchirappalli–Nagapattinam branch line	Alakkudi towards
