= Visakhapatnam–SMVT Bengaluru Express =

Train in India

Visakhapatnam - SMVT Bengaluru Express

Overview
- Service type: Express
- Status: Active
- Locale: Andhra Pradesh, Tamil Nadu and Karnataka
- First service: 10 May 2026; 11 days ago
- Current operator: East Coast Railway (ECoR)

Route
- Termini: Visakhapatnam Junction (VSKP); Sir M. Visvesvaraya Terminal (SMVB)
- Stops: 18
- Distance travelled: 1,072 km (666 mi)
- Average journey time: 22h 30m
- Service frequency: Weekly
- Train number: 18509 / 18510

On-board services
- Classes: General Unreserved, Sleeper Class, AC 3rd Class, AC 3rd Class Economy, AC 2nd Class
- Seating arrangements: Yes
- Sleeping arrangements: Yes
- Catering facilities: Pantry Car
- Observation facilities: Large windows
- Baggage facilities: No
- Other facilities: Below the seats

Technical
- Rolling stock: LHB coach
- Track gauge: 1,676 mm (5 ft 6 in)
- Electrification: 25 kV 50 Hz AC Overhead line
- Operating speed: 130 km/h (81 mph) maximum, 48 km/h (30 mph) average including halts.
- Track owner: Indian Railways

The 18509 / 18510 Visakhapatnam–SMVT Bengaluru Express is an express train belonging to East Coast Railway zone that runs between the city Visakhapatnam Junction of Andhra Pradesh and SMVT Bengaluru of Karnataka in India.

It operates as train number 18509 from Visakhapatnam Junction to SMVT Bengaluru and as train number 18510 in the reverse direction, serving the states of Karnataka, Tamil Nadu and Andhra Pradesh.

== Services ==
• 18509/ Visakhapatnam–SMVT Bengaluru Express has an average speed of 48 km/h and covers 1072 km in 22h 30m.

• 18510/ SMVT Bengaluru–Visakhapatnam Express has an average speed of 49 km/h and covers 1072 km in 21h 40m.

== Route and halts ==
The important halts of the train are :

- Visakhapatnam Junction
- Duvvada
- Elamanchili
- Samalkot Junction
- Rajahmundry
- Eluru
- Vijayawada Junction
- Ongole
- Nellore
- Gudur Junction
- Renigunta Junction
- Katpadi Junction
- Jolarpettai Junction
- Kuppam
- Bangarapet Junction
- Krishnarajapuram
- SMVT Bengaluru

== Schedule ==
• 18509 – 3:20 pm (Sunday) [Visakhapatnam Junction]

• 18510 – 3:50 pm (Monday) [SMVT Bengaluru]

== Coach composition ==
1. General Unreserved – 4
2. Sleeper Class – 6
3. AC 3rd Class – 1
4. AC 3rd Class Economy – 3
5. AC 2nd Class – 1

== Traction ==
As the entire route is fully electrified, it is hauled by a Visakhapatnam Shed-based WAP-7 electric locomotive from Visakhapatnam Junction to SMVT Bengaluru and vice versa.

== Rake reversal or rake share ==
The train will Rake Sharing with as follows :

1. Visakhapatnam–Tirupati Express (18505/18506)

== See also ==
Trains from Visakhapatnam Junction :

1. Kollam–Visakhapatnam Express
2. Samata Express
3. Visakhapatnam–Tirupati Double Decker Express
4. Visakhapatnam–Guntur Uday Express
5. Visakhapatnam–Secunderabad Garib Rath Express

Trains from SMVT Bengaluru :

1. Howrah – SMVT Bengaluru Duronto Express
2. SMVT Bengaluru–Alipurduar Amrit Bharat Express
3. Kamakhya–SMVT Bengaluru AC Superfast Express
4. Anga Express
5. Kalaburagi–SMVT Bengaluru Vande Bharat Express

== Notes ==
a. Runs one day in a week with both directions.
