= KSR Bengaluru–Jolarpettai Express =

Jolarpettai–Bangalore City Express
Overview
- Service type: Express
- Current operator: South Western Railway zone

Route
- Termini: Jolarpettai Junction (JTJ); Bangalore City (SBC)
- Stops: 32
- Distance travelled: 145 km (90 mi)
- Average journey time: 3h 35m
- Service frequency: Daily (Note: Runs seven days in a week for every direction.)
- Train number: 16519/16520

On-board services
- Classes: Sleeper class, General Unreserved
- Seating arrangements: No
- Sleeping arrangements: Yes
- Catering facilities: On-board catering E-catering
- Observation facilities: ICF coach
- Entertainment facilities: No
- Baggage facilities: No
- Other facilities: Below the seats

Technical
- Rolling stock: 2
- Track gauge: 1,676 mm (5 ft 6 in)
- Operating speed: 40 km/h (25 mph), including halts

The Jolarpettai–Bangalore City Express is an Express train belonging to South Western Railway zone that runs between Jolarpettai Junction and Bangalore City in India. It is currently being operated with 16519/16520 train numbers on a weekly basis.

== Service ==
The 16519/Jolarpettai–KSR Bengaluru Express has an average speed of 40 km/h and covers 145 km in 3h 35m. The 16520/KSR Bengaluru–Jolarpettai Express has an average speed of 44 km/h and covers 145 km in 3h 20m.

== Route and halts ==
The important halts of the train are:

- Jolarpettai Junction
- Kuppam
- Bangarapet Junction
- Whitefield
- Krishnarajapuram
- Baiyyappanahalli
- Bangalore East
- Bangalore Cantonment
- Bangalore City

== Coach composition ==
The train has standard ICF rakes with a max speed of 110 kmph. The train consists of 13 coaches:

- 1 Sleeper coaches
- 10 General Unreserved
- 2 Seating cum Luggage Rake

== Traction ==
Both trains are hauled by a Royapuram Loco Shed-based WDP-4 diesel locomotive and WAG-9 electric locomotive from Bangalore to Jolarpettai and vice versa.

== See also ==
- Bangalore City railway station
- Jolarpettai Junction railway station
- Arsikere−Mysore Passenger
- Night Queen Passenger
- Bangarapet–Marikuppam Passenger
