= KSR Bengaluru–Coimbatore Uday Express =

Train in India

KSR Bengaluru-Coimbatore Uday Double Decker Superfast Express
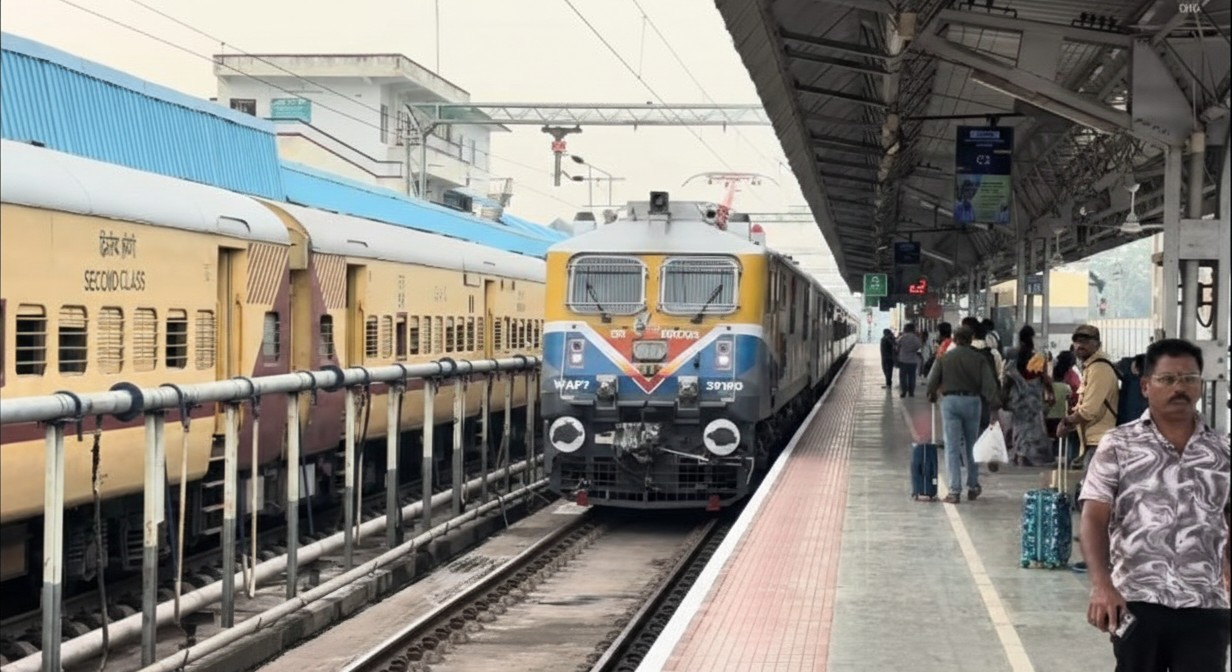
- KSR - CBE arriving at Salem Junction

Overview
- Service type: Uday Express
- Locale: Tamil Nadu, Karnataka
- First service: 8 June 2018; 8 years ago
- Current operator: Southern Railway

Route
- Termini: KSR Bengaluru (SBC); Coimbatore Junction (CBE)
- Stops: 6
- Distance travelled: 419 km (260 mi)
- Average journey time: 6 hrs 45 mins
- Service frequency: Daily
- Train number: 22665 / 22666

On-board services
- Classes: AC Chair Car, Reserved Non Ac Chair car Seating
- Seating arrangements: Yes
- Sleeping arrangements: No
- Auto-rack arrangements: Yes
- Catering facilities: On-board catering, E-catering
- Observation facilities: Large windows
- Entertainment facilities: No
- Baggage facilities: Yes
- Other facilities: Cafeteria

Technical
- Rolling stock: LHB Double Decker + LHB-Uday
- Track gauge: 1,676 mm (5 ft 6 in)
- Operating speed: 64 km/h (40 mph) average including halts

The 22665 / 22666 KSR Bengaluru–Coimbatore Uday Express is the 1st Uday Express series double-decker AC chair train of the Indian Railways connecting KSR Bengaluru of Karnataka and Coimbatore Junction of Tamil Nadu in India. It is currently being operated with 22665/22666 train numbers on all days in a week basis. It operates at an average speed of 65 km/h.There's a Proposal for This Train Should be Extended to Palakkad Town Railway station In Kerala

== Coach composition ==
Utkrisht Double Decker Air Conditioned Yatri Express will be double-decker trains with 40% additional passenger capacity. They will run overnight on busy route by Indian Railways with features of LED screen display to show information about stations, train speed etc. and will have announcement system as well, Vending machines for tea, coffee and milk, Bio toilets in compartments as well as CCTV cameras.

This UDAY Express when introduced had a total of 07 AC coaches; 07 second seating coaches with seating capacitys. The remaining two will be power cars. However, because of low occupancy by passenger.

	Engine	1	2	3	4	5	6	7	8	9	10	11	12	13	14	15	16	17	
22666		DL1	D7	D6	D5	D4	D3	D2	D1	C9	C8	C7	C6	C5	C4	C3	C2	C1	LPR
	Engine		1	2	3	4	5	6	7	8	9	10	11	12	13	14	15	16	17
22665		LPR	C1	C2	C3	C4	C5	C6	C7	C8	C9	D1	D2	D3	D4	D5	D6	D7	DL1

The train shares rake with Chennai–Bangalore Double Decker Express

== Service ==
It averages 62 km/h as 22665 Uday Express starts from Bengaluru City Junction covering 419 km in 6 hrs 45 mins and 61 km/h as 22666 Uday Express starts from Coimbatore Junction covering 419 km in 6 hrs 55 min.

== Schedule ==
The schedule of this 22666/22665 KSR Bengaluru - Coimbatore Jn UDAY Express is given below:-

SBC - CBE - SBC UDAY Express
22666		Stations	22665	
Arrival	Departure	Stations	Arrival	Departure
----	05:45	Coimbatore Junction	21:00	----
06:18	06:20	Tiruppur	19:38	19:40
07:05	07:10	Erode Junction	18:50	18:55
08:02	08:05	Salem Junction	17:52	17:55
09:44	09:45	Tirupattur	16:34	16:35
10:29	10:30	Kuppam	15:42	15:43
12:02	12:03	Krishnarajapuram	14:34	14:35
12:40	----	KSR Bengaluru City Junction	----	14:15

== Traction ==
Both trains are hauled by a WAP-7 of Royapuram / Erode Locomotive Shed on its entire journey.

== See also ==
- Chennai–Bangalore Double Decker Express
- Visakhapatnam–Guntur Uday Express
- Coimbatore–Bengaluru Cantonment Vande Bharat Express
- Uday Express
