= Lal Bagh Express =

Train in India between Chennai and Bengaluru

Lalbagh Express
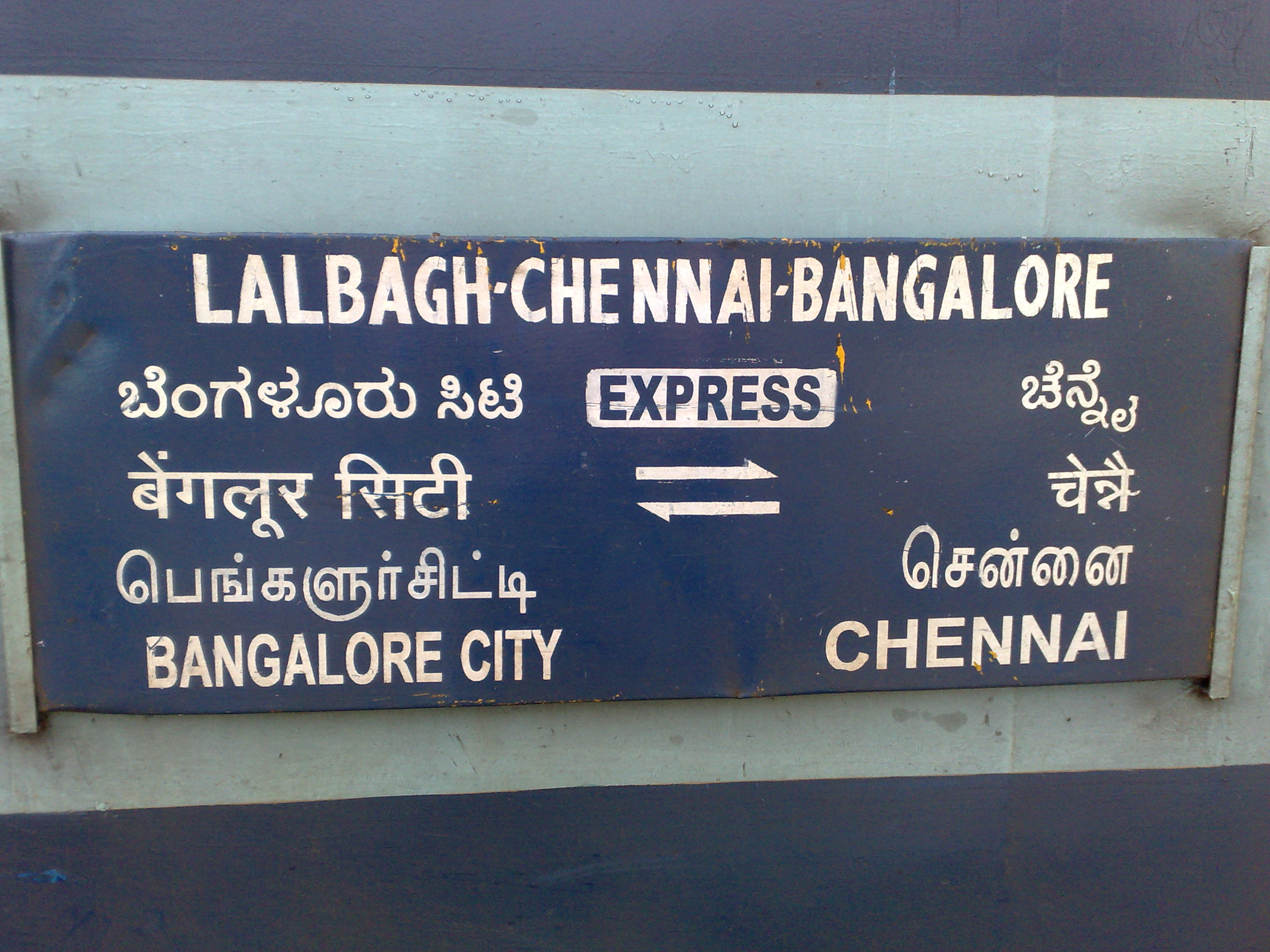
- Lalbagh SF Express

Overview
- Service type: Superfast Express
- Status: Operational
- Locale: Karnataka, Andhra Pradesh, Tamil Nadu
- First service: 1 July 1992; 33 years ago
- Current operator: South Western Railways
- Website: https://indianrail.gov.in/

Route
- Termini: KSR Bengaluru (SBC); MGR Chennai Central (MAS)
- Stops: 11 halts
- Distance travelled: 359 km (223 mi)
- Average journey time: 5hrs 55mins
- Service frequency: Daily service
- Train number: 12608 / 12607
- Line used: Chennai-KSR Bengaluru line

On-board services
- Classes: Unreserved Class, Reserved Class, AC Chair Car
- Seating arrangements: Yes
- Sleeping arrangements: No
- Catering facilities: Available
- Baggage facilities: Overhead racks

Technical
- Rolling stock: LHB coaches
- Track gauge: 1,676 mm (5 ft 6 in) broad gauge
- Electrification: 25 kV AC at 50 Hz
- Operating speed: 61 km/h (38 mph)
- Track owner: Indian Railways
- Rake maintenance: KSR Bengaluru (SBC)
Route map
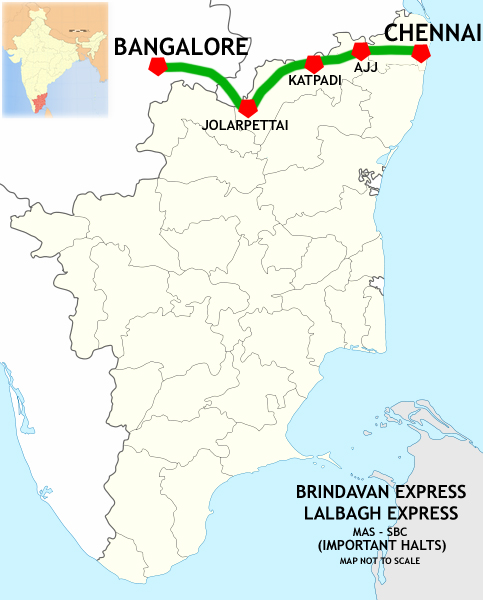

The 12607 /12608 Lalbagh S. F Express is a Daily Superfast express train connecting KSR Bengaluru and MGR Chennai Central. It is currently operated with train numbers 12608/12607 on a daily service basis.

== Loco link ==
This train is currently hauled by WAP-7 so was WAP-4 class electric locomotive maintained by Electric Loco Shed Erode, Royapuram of Southern Railways and Krishnarajapuram of South Western Railways.

== Timings ==
This train is a daily service train with the following departures and arrivals at some of these stations:-

KSR Bengaluru City Jn ↔ MGR Chennai Central (Lalbagh SF Express)
12608		Station Name	Station Code	12607	
Arrival	Departure	Station Name	Station Code	Arrival	Departure
-	06:20	KSR Bengaluru City Junction	SBC	22:00	-
06:30	06:32	Bangalore Cantonment	BNC	21:09	21:10
06:41	06:42	Krishnarajapuram	KJM	20:46	20:47
07:24	07:25	Bangarapet Junction	BWT	20:00	20:01
07:51	07:52	Kuppam	KPN	19:32	19:33
08:38	08:40	Jolarpettai Junction	JTJ	18:53	18:55
09:05	09:07	Ambur	AB	18:13	18:15
09:48	09:50	Katpadi Junction	KPD	17:33	17:35
10:09	10:10	Walajah Road Junction	WJR	17:08	17:10
10:23	10:25	Sholinghur	SHU	16:53	16:55
10:43	10:45	Arakkonam Junction	AJJ	16:33	16:35
11:33	11:35	Perambur	PER	15:43	15:45
12:15	-	MGR Chennai Central	MAS	-	15:30

== Coach composition ==
The train has 20 coaches. It is categorized as a "Superfast Express". The composition of this train is:

	1	2	3	4	5	6	7	8	9	10	11	12	13	14	15	16	17	18	19	20	21
12608		SLR	GEN	GEN	GEN	GEN	D11	D10	D9	D8	PC	D7	D6	D5	D4	D3	D2	D1	C2	C1	EOG
	1	2	3	4	5	6	7	8	9	10	11	12	13	14	15	16	17	18	19	20	21
12607		EOG	C1	C2	D1	D2	D3	D4	D5	D6	D7	PC	D8	D9	D10	D11	GEN	GEN	GEN	GEN	SLR

Another great vendor express in which one can mingle with passengers of various Dravidian linguistic backgrounds. Many vendors with their wares jostle for space. The Train has been named after the famous Lalbagh Botanical Garden In Bangalore

== Introduction and destinations ==
Lalbagh Express was introduced by the Southern Railway. At the time of introduction, the train had only one stop - Katpadi junction. But now it stops at 11 stations including Bangalore Cantonment, Krishnarajapuram, Bangarpet, Kuppam, Jolarpettai, Ambur, Vellore-Katpadi, Sholingur, Walajah road, Arakkonam and traverses the 362 km distance in 5 hours 45 min. The rake is now maintained by South Western Railway at Bangalore.

== See also ==
- Chennai - Bengaluru Shatabdi Express
- Brindavan Express
- Chennai - Bengaluru Double Decker Express
