= Chennai–Bangalore Double Decker Express =

Indian train line

MGR Chennai Central – KSR Bengaluru Double Decker Express
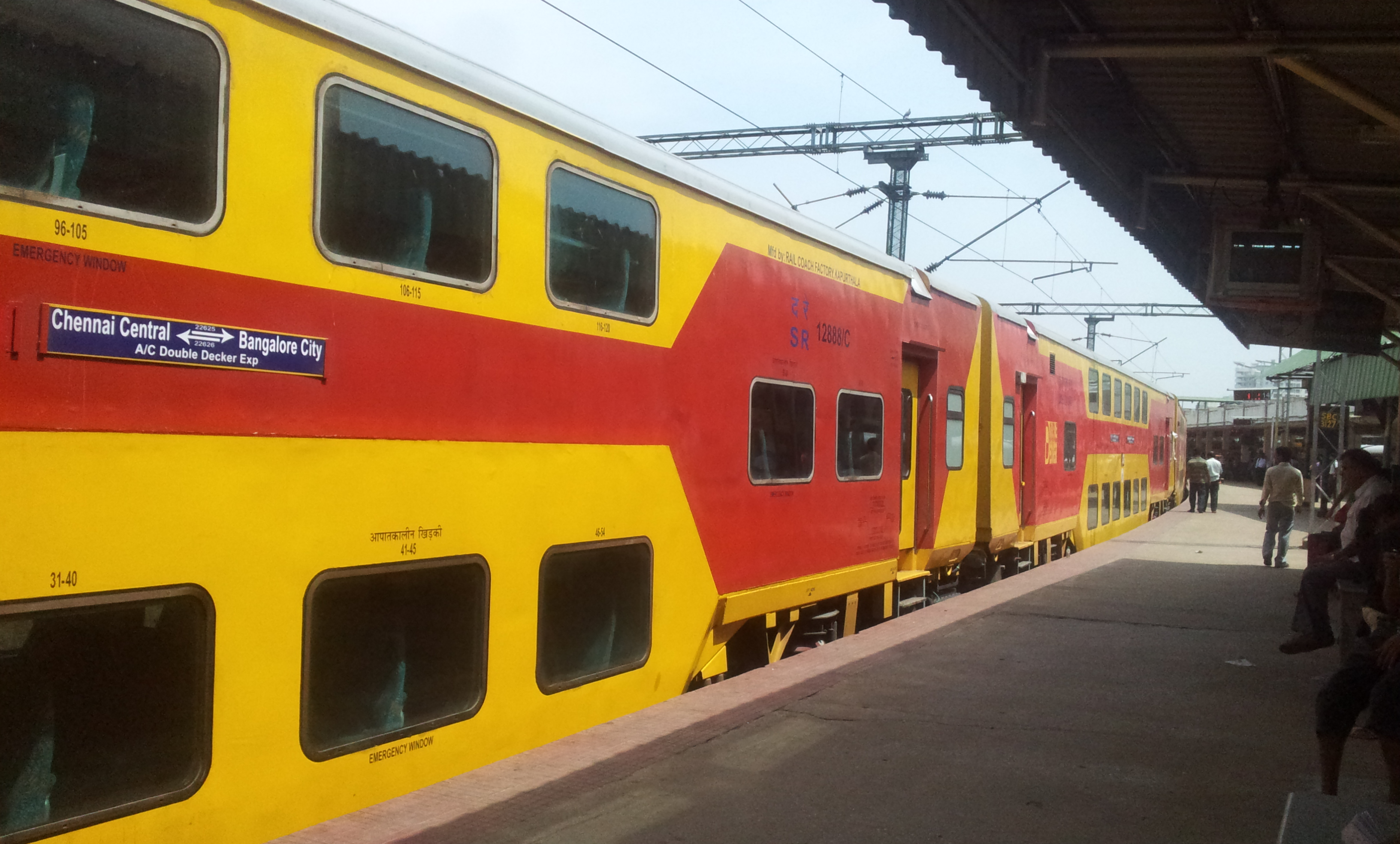

Overview
- Service type: Double Decker Express
- Status: Operational
- Locale: Tamil Nadu, Andhra Pradesh & Karnataka
- First service: 25 April 2013
- Current operator: Southern Railways

Route
- Termini: MGR Chennai Central (MAS); KSR Bengaluru (SBC)
- Stops: 9/10
- Distance travelled: 365 km (227 mi)
- Average journey time: 6 hrs
- Service frequency: Daily
- Train number: 22625 / 22626

On-board services
- Classes: AC Chair Car, non-AC second-class reserved
- Seating arrangements: Yes
- Sleeping arrangements: No
- Catering facilities: Available
- Observation facilities: Large windows
- Baggage facilities: Available

Technical
- Rolling stock: LHB Double Decker + LHB-Uday
- Track gauge: 1,676 mm (5 ft 6 in) broad gauge
- Operating speed: Average speed – 60 km/h
Route map
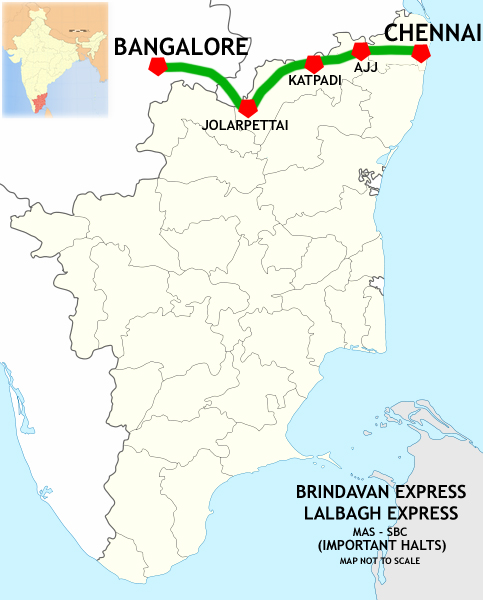

The 22625 / 22626 MGR Chennai Central–KSR Bengaluru AC Double Decker Express is a Double Decker Express connecting Chennai Central and KSR Bengaluru. It is the 1st AC Double Decker Express in South India.

This train uses LHB coaches. The train is usually hauled by either a Royapuram WAP-7 or an Erode WAP-7 and so was WAP-4 locomotive. WAP-7 #30332 of Royapuram Electric Loco Shed hauled the Inaugural Special.

== Schedule ==
The schedule of the 22626/22625 KSR Bengaluru - MGR Chennai Central AC Double Decker Express is given below:-

MAS - SBC - MAS AC Double Decker Express
22625		Stations	22626	
Arrival	Departure	Stations	Arrival	Departure
----	07:25	MGR Chennai Central	19:45	----
----		Perambur	19:13	19:15
08:18	08:20	Arakkonam Junction	18:28	18:30
09:08	09:10	Katpadi Junction	17:43	17:45
09:48	09:50	Ambur	16:48	16:50
10:03	10:05	Vaniyambadi	16:34	16:36
10:23	10:25	Jolarpet Junction	16:15	16:20
11:02	11:03	Kuppam	15:02	15:03
11:28	11:30	Bangarapet Junction	14:34	14:35
12:18	12:20	Krishnarajapuram	13:52	13:54
12:35	12:37	Bengaluru Cantt.	13:40	13:42
13:10	----	KSR Bengaluru	----	13:30

== Coach composition ==
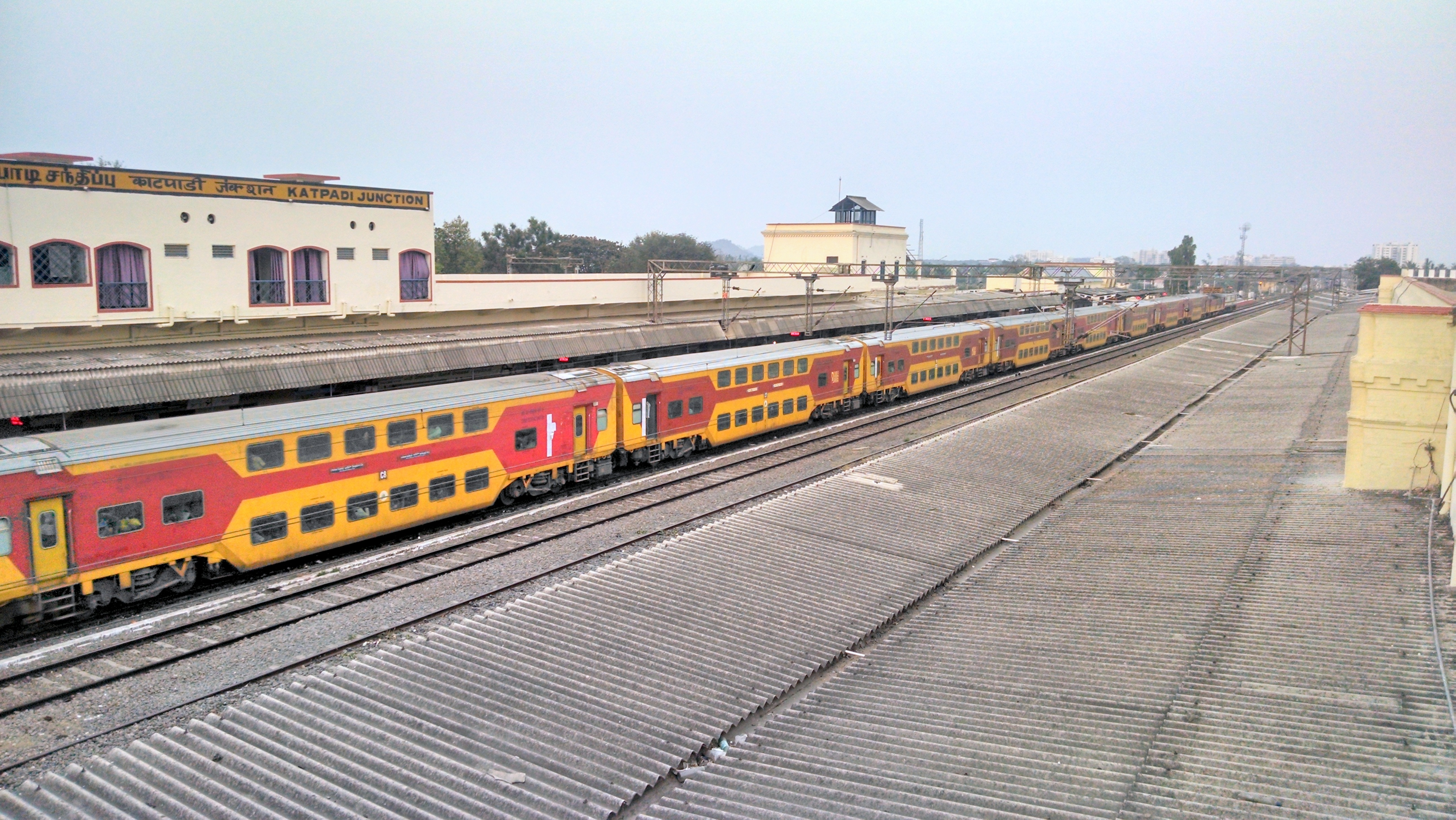
Chennai–Bangalore AC Double Decker Express at Vellore

The 22625/22626 MGR Chennai Central - KSR Bengaluru AC Double Decker Express train has eight AC Chair cars, five non-AC second-class reserved coaches and two power cars. It can use original LHB Double Decker or Green LHB Double Decker coaches for this line.

	Engine	1	2	3	4	5	6	7	8	9	10	11	12	13	14	15	16	17	
22625		DL1	D7	D6	D5	D4	D3	D2	D1	C9	C8	C7	C6	C5	C4	C3	C2	C1	LPR
	Engine		1	2	3	4	5	6	7	8	9	10	11	12	13	14	15	16	17
22626		LPR	C1	C2	C3	C4	C5	C6	C7	C8	C9	D1	D2	D3	D4	D5	D6	D7	DL1

The train shares rake with KSR Bengaluru-Coimbatore Uday Express
