= Mysuru–Renigunta Express =

Express train in India

Mysuru – Renigunta Express
Overview
- Service type: Express
- First service: 1 June 2018
- Current operators: South Western Railways & Central Railways

Route
- Termini: Mysuru Junction; Renigunta Junction
- Stops: 8
- Distance travelled: 492 km (306 mi)
- Average journey time: 9 Hours 25 mins
- Service frequency: Weekly
- Train number: 11065 / 11066

On-board services
- Classes: AC 1st Class, AC 2 tier, AC 3 tier, Sleeper, General
- Sleeping arrangements: Yes
- Catering facilities: No Pantry Car Coach attached

Technical
- Rolling stock: ICF coach
- Track gauge: 1,676 mm (5 ft 6 in)
- Operating speed: 140 km/h (87 mph) maximum,53 km/h (33 mph), including halts

Mysuru–Renigunta Express is a Weekly Express Train which runs Between the Mysore & Renigunta section which comes under the South Western Railway zone in Karnataka, Tamil Nadu & Andhra Pradesh State in India. It is an Important connectivity for commuters of Mysuru (Mysore) and Renigunta.

== Overview ==
Mysuru–Renigunta Express was officially started by South Western Railway on 1 June 2018, for connecting the Southern parts of Karnataka and Andhra Pradesh and increasing frequency for Mysuru (Mysore) and Renigunta Route.

== Routes ==
This train passes through KSR Bengaluru City, Jolarpettai Junction & Katpadi Junction on both sides.

== Traction ==
As the route is fully electrified, the WAP 7 and WAP 4 loco pulls the train to its destination.
