= Bengaluru City–Chennai Central Shatabdi Express =

Indian express train

KSR Bengaluru City Jn – MGR Chennai Central Shatabdi Express
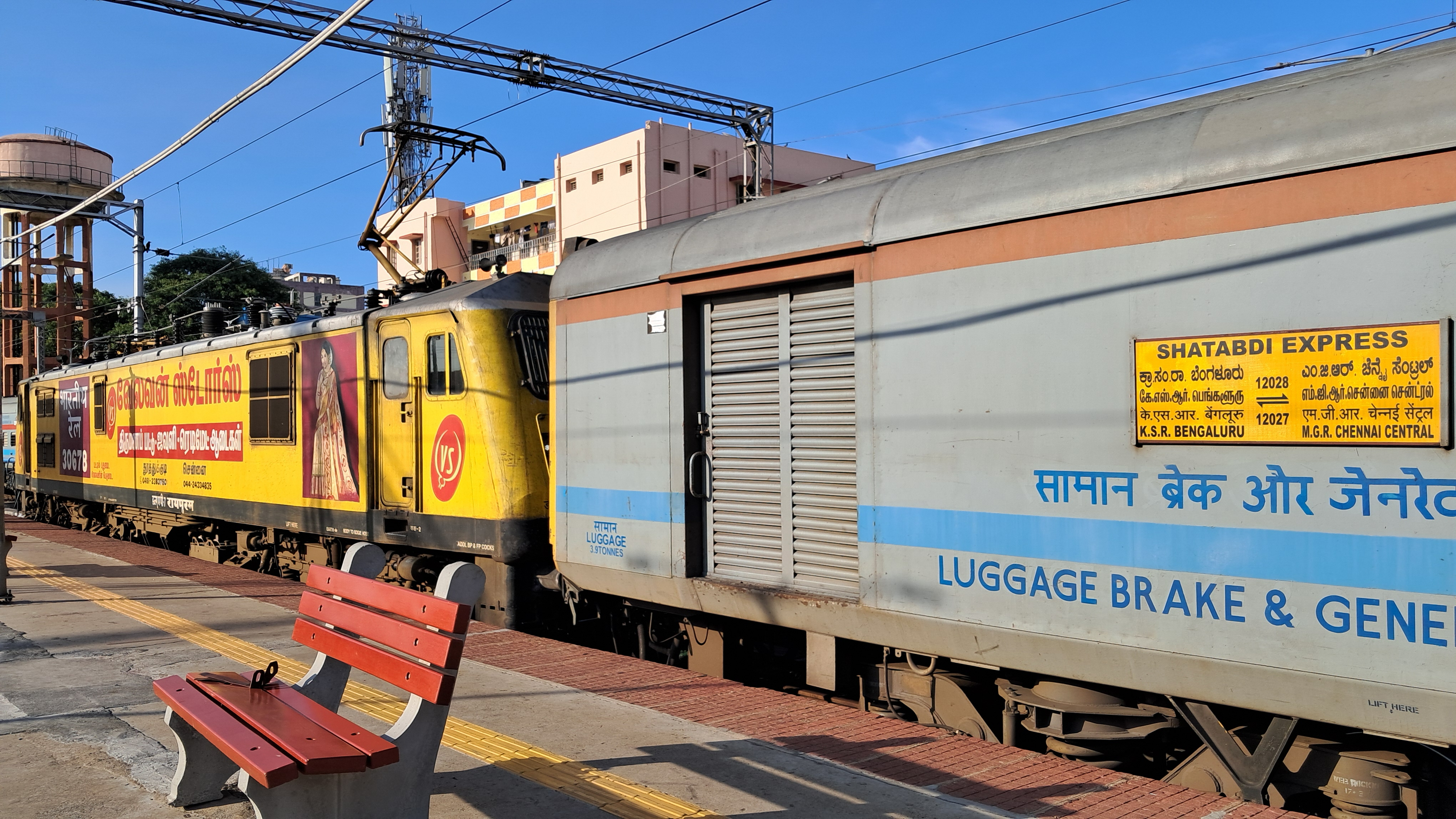
- Chennai Central - KSR Bengaluru Shatabdi Express on standby at MGR Chennai Central

Overview
- Service type: Shatabdi Express
- Locale: Karnataka & Tamil Nadu
- First service: 12 October 2005; 20 years ago
- Current operator: South Western Railways

Route
- Termini: KSR Bengaluru City Jn (SBC); MGR Chennai Central (MAS)
- Stops: 3
- Distance travelled: 355.900 km (221 mi) (chargeable distance 362 km)
- Average journey time: 4 hours 57.5 minutes average of both directions
- Service frequency: 6 Days a week (Note: Except Tuesdays)
- Train number: 12028 / 12027

On-board services
- Classes: Executive Chair Car, AC Chair Car
- Seating arrangements: Yes
- Sleeping arrangements: No
- Catering facilities: Yes but no pantry car
- Observation facilities: Large windows
- Baggage facilities: Overhead racks

Technical
- Rolling stock: LHB coach
- Track gauge: 1,676 mm (5 ft 6 in)
- Operating speed: 110 km/h (68 mph) maximum, maximum 130 kmph is planned in Chennai – Jolarpettai part, 71.78 km/h (45 mph) average including halts
Route map
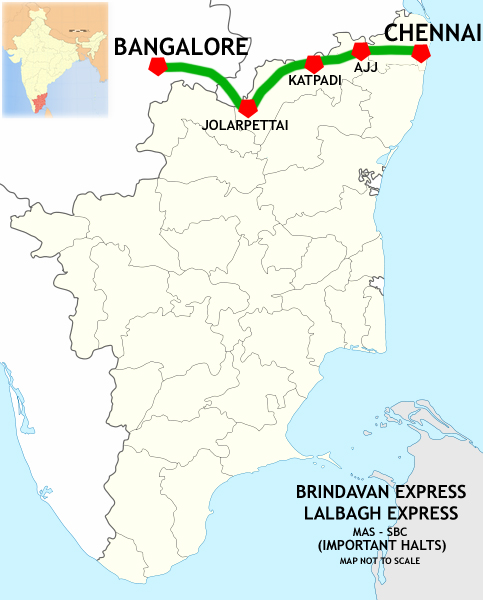

The 12027 / 12028 Krantivira Sangolli Rayanna Bengaluru Station – Puratchi Thalaivar Dr. M.G. Ramachandran Chennai Central Railway Station Shatabdi Express is a Superfast Express train of Shatabdi class belonging to Indian Railways that runs between Krantivira Sangolli Rayanna Bengaluru Station and Puratchi Thalaivar Dr. M.G. Ramachandran Central railway station via Vellore Katpadi Junction in India. It is a 6 days a week service with Tuesdays being the weekly day off. It operates as train number 12028 from Krantivira Sangolli Rayanna Bengaluru station to Puratchi Thalaivar Dr. M.G. Ramachandran Central railway station and as train number 12027 in the reverse direction.

== Coaches ==
Krantivira Sangolli Rayanna Bengaluru Station–Puratchi Thalaivar Dr. M.G. Ramachandran Central Railway Station Shatabdi Express generally has 2 Executive Chair Car coaches, 12 AC Chair Car coaches and 2 luggage cum generator coaches. The train runs with the Linke-Hofmann Busch (LHB) coaches. As customary, the composition of coaches is at the discretion of Indian Railways. There is no pantry car but catering is arranged on board the train.

The coaches in Light blue colour indicate AC Chair Cars and the coaches in Violet colour indicate Executive Chair Cars.

	1	2	3	4	6	7	8	9	10	11	12	13	14	15	16	17	18
12027		EOG	C12	C11	C10	C9	C8	C7	C6	C5	C4	C3	C2	C1	E2	E1	EOG
12028		EOG	E1	E2	C1	C2	C3	C4	C5	C6	C7	C8	C9	C10	C11	C12	EOG

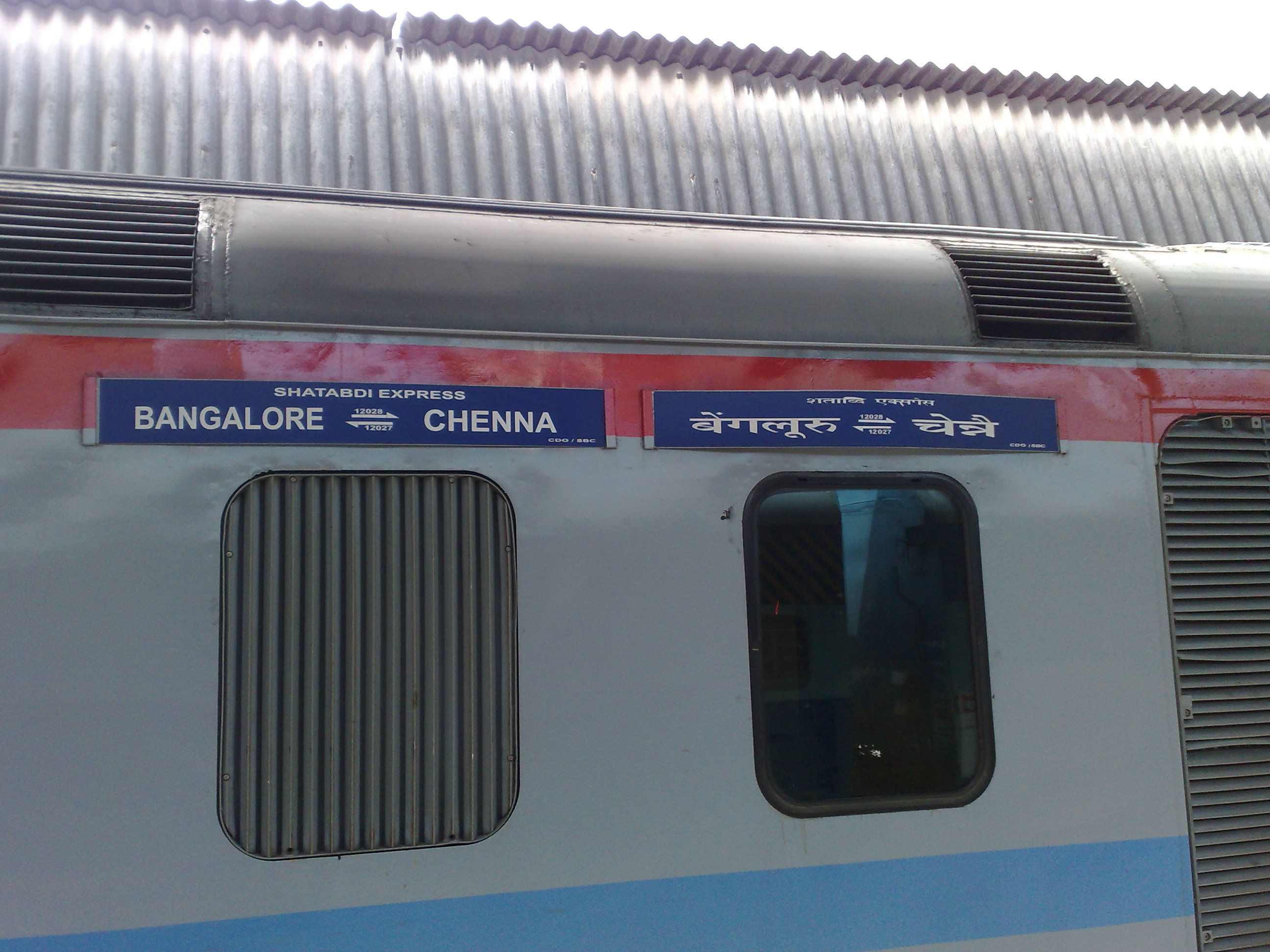
12027 Bangalore Shatabdi Express – EOG car

== Service ==
This train and Chennai Central–Mysuru Shatabdi Express are two fastest trains on the KSR Bengaluru–Chennai sector (both may not be equal). As per Bengaluru Division Map on South Western Railway website, it covers the distance of 355.900 kilometres (chargeable distance 362 km - maybe due to higher maintenance cost for topography with higher gradients. The difference of real and chargeable distance is due to the difference between Jolarpettai and Mulanur by comparing the distance written in trains schedule of this part and the distance written in Bengaluru Division Map on South Western Railway website). It covers the distance in around 4 hours 55 mins towards Chennai and 5 hours 00 mins towards KSR Bengaluru as 12028 and 12027 Shatabdi Express runs at a speed of (71.78 km/h) in average of both directions.

== Schedule ==
The schedule of this 12027/12028 KSR Bengaluru - MGR Chennai Central Shatabdi Express is given below:-

SBC - MAS - SBC Shatabdi Express
12028		Stations	12027	
Arrival	Departure	Stations	Arrival	Departure
----	06:00	KSR Bengaluru City Junction	22:25	----
06:09	06:10	Bengaluru Cantt.	22:04	22:05
07:49	07:50	Jolarpettai Junction	20:13	20:15
08:58	09:00	Katpadi Junction	18:58	19:00
11:00	----	MGR Chennai Central	----	17:30

== Speed ==
Its all coaches are of air conditioned LHB coach type which is capable of reaching 160 km/h but it does not touch. Sometimes people become confused because according to Indian Railways Permanent Way Manual (IRPWM) on Indian Railways website or Indian Railway Institute of Civil Engineering website, the BG (Broad Gauge) lines have been classified into six groups ‘A’ to ‘E’ on the basis of the future maximum permissible speeds but it may not be same as present speed.

The maximum permissible speed of the train and the route is 110 km/h. SOUTH WESTERN RAILWAY (SWR) increased the speed limit of KSR Bengaluru - Jolarpettai section to 110 kmph in 2020; Maximum Permissible Speed in Chennai Central – Arakkonam Jn. (DN FAST, UP FAST), Arakkonam – Jolarpettai is 110 kmph as of 2021 but Chennai – Jolarpettai section speed to be increased to 130 kmph from 110 km/h which is yet to be implemented . The train will run at a maximum speed of 130 km/h in Chennai – Jolarpettai section in future after constructing infrastructure.

== Loco link ==
earlier was meant to be WAP-4, now It is hauled by a WAP-7 and WAP-5 end to end.
