= Kuppam railway station =

Railway station in Andhra Pradesh, India

Kuppam
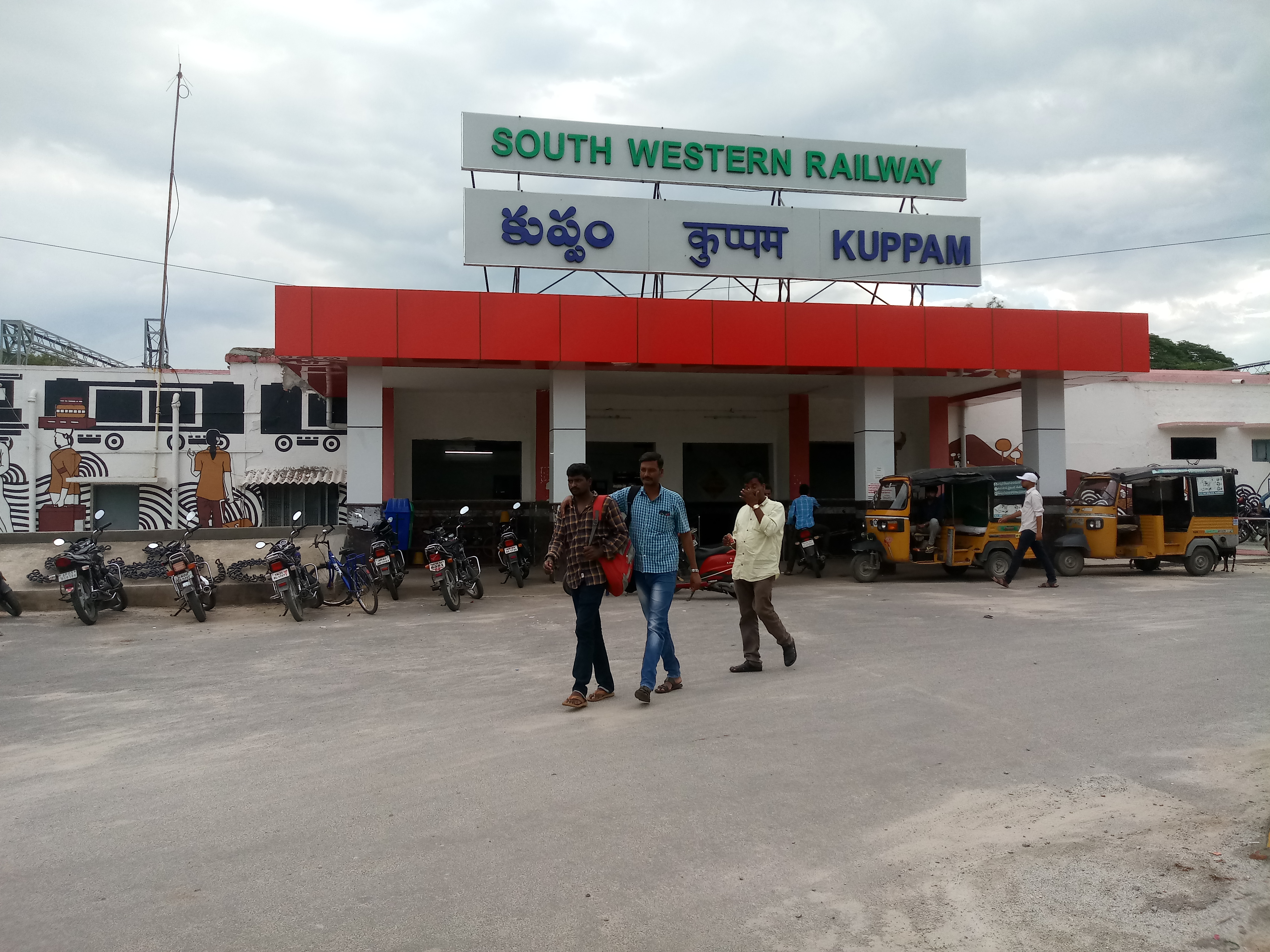
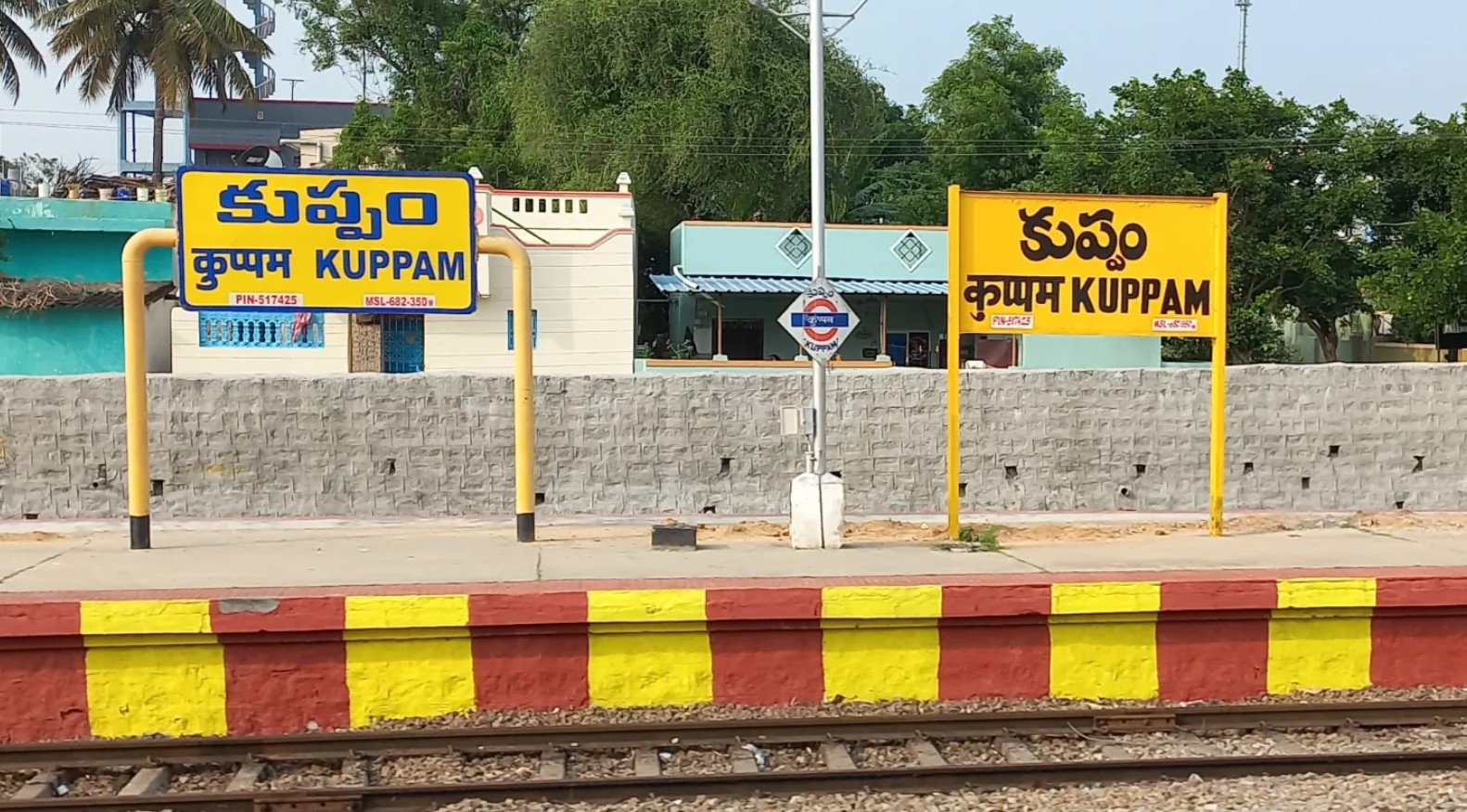

General information
- Location: RS Pet, Kuppam, Andhra Pradesh 517425; India
- Coordinates: 12°44′51″N 78°20′21″E
- Elevation: 682 metres (2,238 ft)
- System: Indian Railways station
- Owner: Indian Railways
- Operator: South Western Railway
- Line: Chennai Central–Bangalore City line
- Platforms: 2
- Tracks: 4

Construction
- Structure type: Standard on ground
- Parking: Yes
- Cycle facilities: No

Other information
- Status: Functioning
- Station code: KPN
- Division(s): Bangalore

History
- Opened: 1958

Services
Preceding station	Indian Railways	Following station
Bangarapet towards Bangalore City	Chennai Central–Bangalore City line	Jolarpet Junction towards Chennai Central
Location
- Location within Andhra Pradesh

Kuppam railway station (station code:KPN) is a double-line electrified railway station on the Chennai Central–Bangalore City line, in south India.

Some of the major routes that cross this station are MGR Chennai Central, Jolarpettai Jn in the border of Karnataka and Tamil Nadu of India, Salem Jn, and many more. Some of the popular trains crossing this station and traveling towards Bengaluru are Lalbagh SF Express (12607/12608), Brindavan Express (12639/12640), SMVT Bengaluru–Alipurduar Amrit Bharat Express 16597/16598 and Chennai–Bangalore Double Decker Express (22625/22626), KSR Bengaluru–Coimbatore Uday Express (22665/22666) and many more.

== Extras ==
Kuppam, a city in Andhra Pradesh is famous for its granite quarries and factories. A granite variety, Kuppam Green, is named after the town as this variety is abundantly found in this area and exported to foreign countries on demand.

== Amenities ==
The Kuppam railway station has a computerized reservation counter, waiting room, vegetarian refreshment stall, tea stall and book stall.
