= Bangarapet Junction railway station =

Railway Station in Karnataka, India

Bangarapet Junction Bangarapete Junction
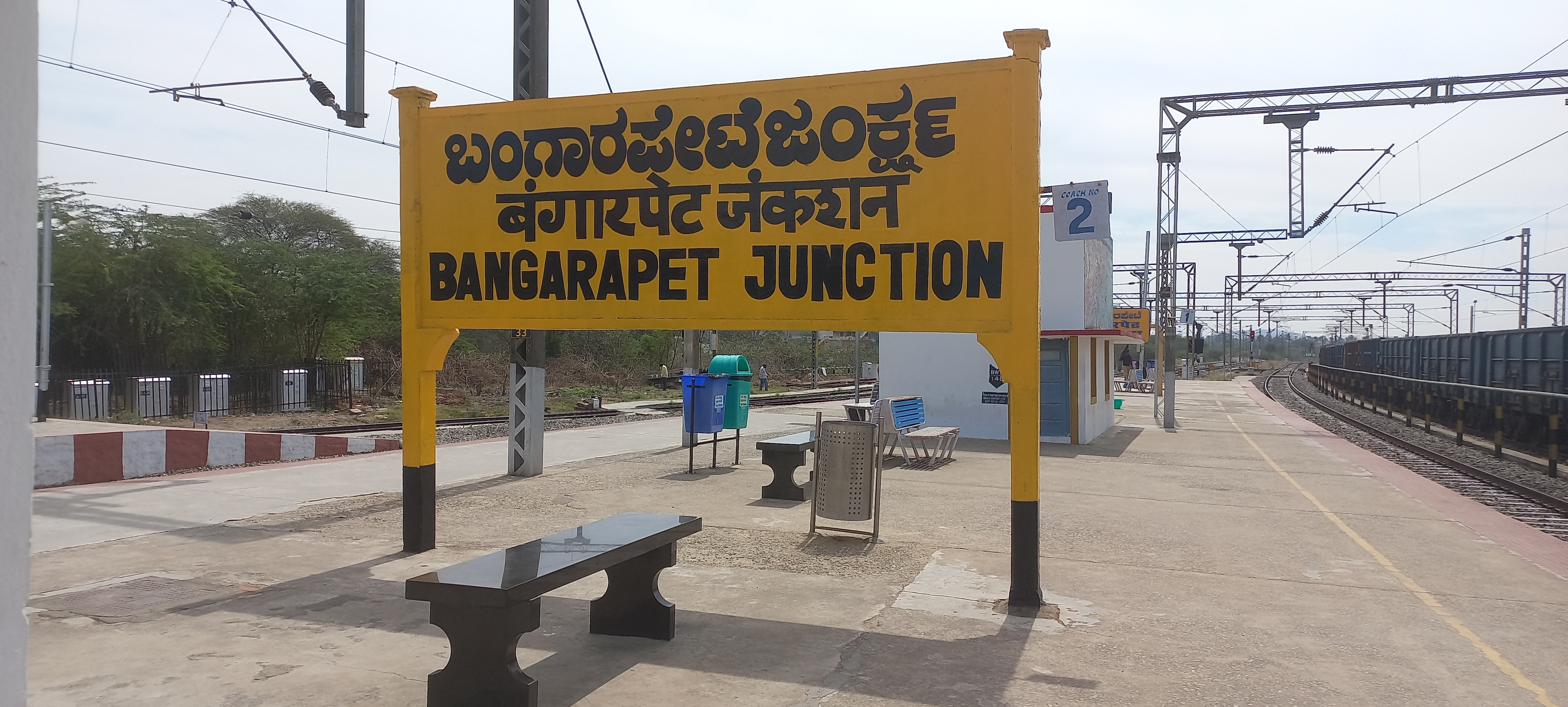

General information
- Other names: Bowringpet Junction
- Location: State Highway 95 (Karnataka)|State Highway 95, Bangarapet, Kolar district, Karnataka; India
- Coordinates: 12°59′06″N 78°10′43″E
- Elevation: 815 metres (2,674 ft)
- System: Indian Railways station
- Owner: Indian Railways
- Operator: South Western Railway
- Line: Chennai Central–Bangalore City line Yelahanka–Bangarpet line Bangarpet–Marikuppam line
- Platforms: 6
- Tracks: 10

Construction
- Structure type: Standard on ground
- Parking: Yes
- Cycle facilities: No

Other information
- Status: Functioning
- Station code: BWT
- Division(s): Bangalore

History
- Opened: 1864

Services
Preceding station	Indian Railways	Following station
Whitefield towards Bangalore City	Chennai Central–Bangalore City line	Kuppam towards Chennai Central
Location
- Location within Karnataka

Bangarapet Junction railway station, also known as Bangarapete Junction railway station (station code:BWT) is a double-line electrified railway station which is located in the heart of the city. It is one of the important railway stations in the Chennai Central–Bangalore City line where many people board and de-board for many purposes.

Some of the major routes that cross this station are MGR Chennai Central, New Tinsukia Jn in the Northeast part of India, Howrah Jn, and many more. Some of the popular trains crossing this station and traveling towards Bengaluru are Lalbagh SF Express (12607/12608), Brindavan Express (12639/12640) and Chennai–Bangalore Double Decker Express (22625/22626) and many more.

== History ==
Madras Cantonment to Jolarpettai as a branch on the newly constructed Chennai–Beypur line in 1864. The station was then known by the name as Kolar Road for its proximity to the Kolar Gold fields and later christened as Bowringpet, the name of a District collector of the British of the area. Bangalore Mail started running around the same period, the exact date not being very clear.

The 2 ft 6 in (762 mm) wide narrow-gauge line between Bowringpet (later Bangarapet) and Kolar was opened in 1913 by Mysore State Railway. The narrow-gauge Yeshvantapur–Devanhalli–Chikballapur line was opened in 1915, Extension of NG Line from Kolar to Chickballapur via Sidlaghatta, Chintamani, Srinivasapura under Yelahanka-Bangarpet section narrow-gauge line in 1916 and final extension of NG Line from Yeshwantpur-Bangalore in 1918. Gauge conversion of the Bangarpet–Kolar line was completed and opened for traffic in 1997 and since then it has been serviced by a railbus. Gauge conversion of Yelankha–Chickballapur was completed and opened for traffic in 2004. Then, gauge conversion of Chickballapur–Kolar was completed and opened for traffic in November 2013, thus connecting the entire network into an Yelankha–Bangarpet broad-gauge line.

The 5 ft 6 in (1,676 mm) broad gauge Bangarpet–Marikuppam line opened in 1894.

== Electrification ==
The Mulanur–Bangarpet–Bangalore City sector was electrified in 1991–92.

== Amenities ==
The Bangarapet railway station has a subscriber trunk dialing booth, computerized reservation counter, waiting room, vegetarian refreshment stall, tea stall and book stall.

Preceding station	Indian Railways	Following station
Varadapur towards Jolarpettai Junction	South Western Railway zone Chennai Central–Bangalore City line	Maralahalli towards Krishnarajapuram
Terminus	South Western Railway zone Bangarapet–Kolar–Yelahanka line	Kolar towards Bangalore City
Terminus	South Western Railway zone Bangarapet–Marikuppam branch line	BEML Nagar towards Marikuppam
