= Chenguttai =

Village in Vellore, Tamil Nadu, India

Coordinates: 12°59′30″N 79°09′00″E

Chenguttai is a village which is a part of Vellore municipality, Tamil Nadu, India. It is located very closely to the Katpadi Railway station. There are about six temples in the village.
