= Tiruppattur railway station =

Railway station in Tamil Nadu, India

Tirupattur Junction

General information
- Location: Railway Colony, Tirupattur, Tirupattur, Tamil Nadu; India
- Coordinates: 12.4981°N 78.5614°E
- Elevation: 392 m (1,286 ft)
- System: Indian Railways station
- Owner: Indian Railways
- Operator: Southern Railway
- Lines: Jolarpettai–Shoranur line, Tirupattur–Krishnagiri line
- Platforms: 3
- Tracks: 5
- Connections: Bus stand, taxicab stand, auto rickshaw stand

Construction
- Structure type: Standard (on-ground station)
- Parking: Yes

Other information
- Status: Functioning
- Station code: TPT
- Zone(s): Southern Railway
- Division(s): Salem
Location
- Location within Tamil Nadu Location within India

Tirupattur Junction railway station (station code: TPT) is an NSG–5 category Indian railway station in the Salem railway division of the Southern Railway zone. It is a railway station serving the town of Tirupattur in Tamil Nadu, India.

== History ==
This railway station was constructed by the South Indian Railway Company. It acted as a junction railway station during British India. A drought railway line was constructed by the Madras Railway (MR) between Tirupattur and Krishnagiri in order to ameliorate the severe drought faced during the period of 1905.

The line connected Tirupattur to Krishnagiri, a length of 25 miles (40 km) and opened in 1905. The line was the property of the Government, on whose behalf it was worked by the MR up to 31 December 1907. With effect from 1 January 1908 it was made over to the South Indian Railway (SIR) Company for maintenance and working.

== Location and layout ==
The railway station is located off the Railway Colony of Tirupattur. The nearest bus depot is located in Tirupattur while the nearest airport is situated 172 kilometres (107 mi) away in Bengaluru and 212 kilometres (132 mi) away in Chennai.

== Lines ==
The station is a focal point of the line that connects Chennai with places such as Jolarpettai Junction, Salem Junction, Erode Junction, Coimbatore Junction etc.

- BG single line towards Chennai Central via Jolarpettai Junction, Katpadi Junction, and Arakkonam Junction.
- BG single line towards Salem Junction, Bommidi.

== Projects and development ==
It is one of the 73 stations in Tamil Nadu to be named for upgradation under the Amrit Bharat Station Scheme of Indian Railways.
