= Hassan–Bangalore section =

Railway line in India

Hassan-Bengaluru section

Overview
- Status: Operational
- Owner: Indian Railways
- Locale: Karnataka
- Termini: Hassan Junction (HAS); KSR Bengaluru City (SBC)

Service
- Operator: South Western Railway
- Depot: Krishnarajapuram (KJM)

History
- Opened: 2017

Technical
- Track length: 179 km (111 mi)
- Number of tracks: 1
- Track gauge: 5 ft 6 in (1,676 mm) broad gauge
- Electrification: Yes

The KSR Bengaluru-Hassan section, part of the Bengaluru division of South Western Railway Zone, connects the cities of Bengaluru and Hassan. This line was the dream project of former prime minister H. D. Deve Gowda, open to the general public in March 2017. The inaugural train was the 22679 Yeshwantpur-Hassan Intercity Express. This direct line connects the two cities, forming a straight rail link from Bengaluru to Mangaluru with no reversals. Previously, there were two routes to Mangaluru via Hassan - one via Ramanagara-Mysuru-Holenarasipura, taking 12 hours with two reversals (at Mysuru and Hassan) and another via Tumakuru-Arsikere, taking 10.5-11 hours with one reversal (at Arsikere). This direct route via Yediyur, with no reversals, is significantly shorter and saves time, taking only 9 hours between the two cities.

== History ==
The rail line from Hassan to Bangalore via Shravanabelagola, Kunigal, Nelamangala was announced in the Railway Budget 1996. The work began in 1998. The line is divided into two sections: the first is from Hassan to Shravanabelagola, and the second from Shravanabelagola to Nelamangala and Bengaluru.

== Inaugural ==
A goods trial run was successfully completed by 7 January 2006. The line was officially opened to traffic on 31 January 2006. Special trains were introduced on this line during the Mahamastakabhisheka festival in 2006, catering to the increased passenger demand.

== Stations on this Line ==
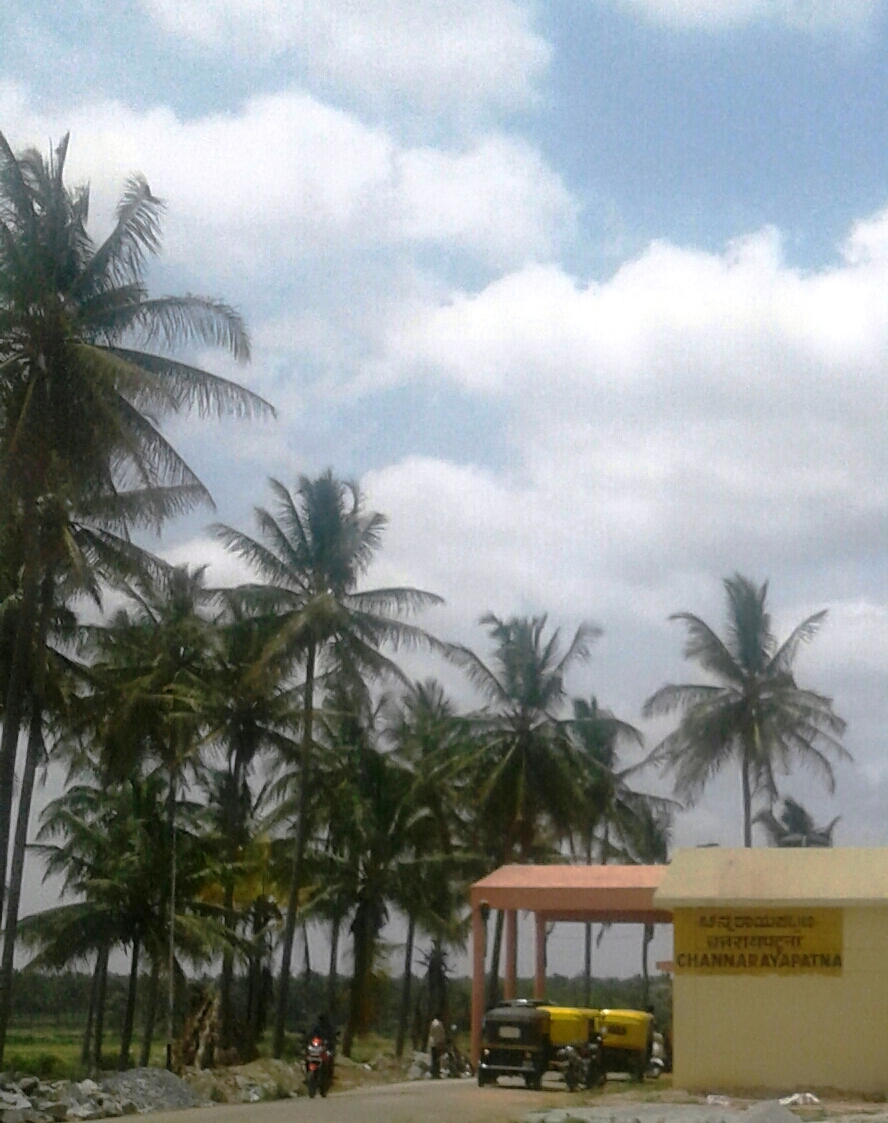
Channarayapatna

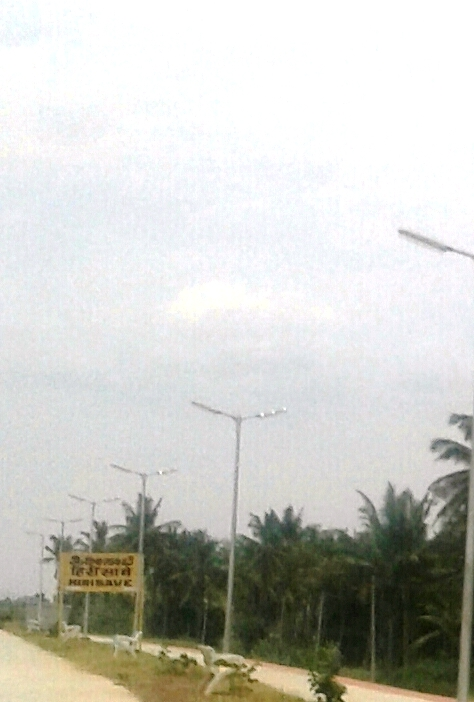
Hirisave

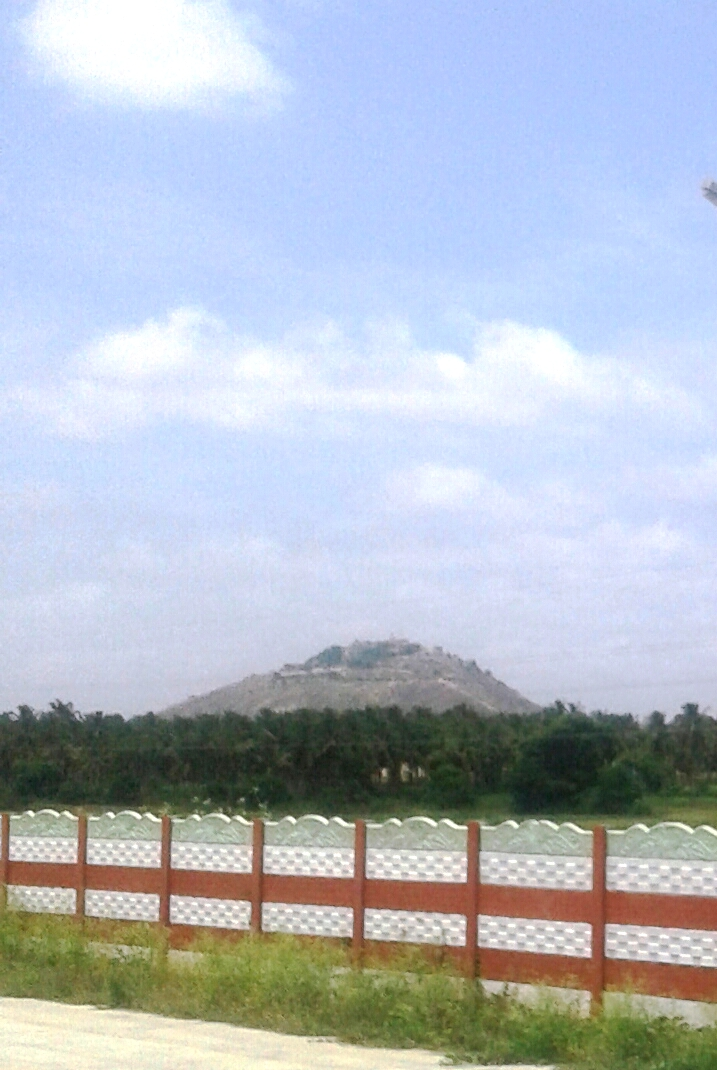
Shravanabelagola

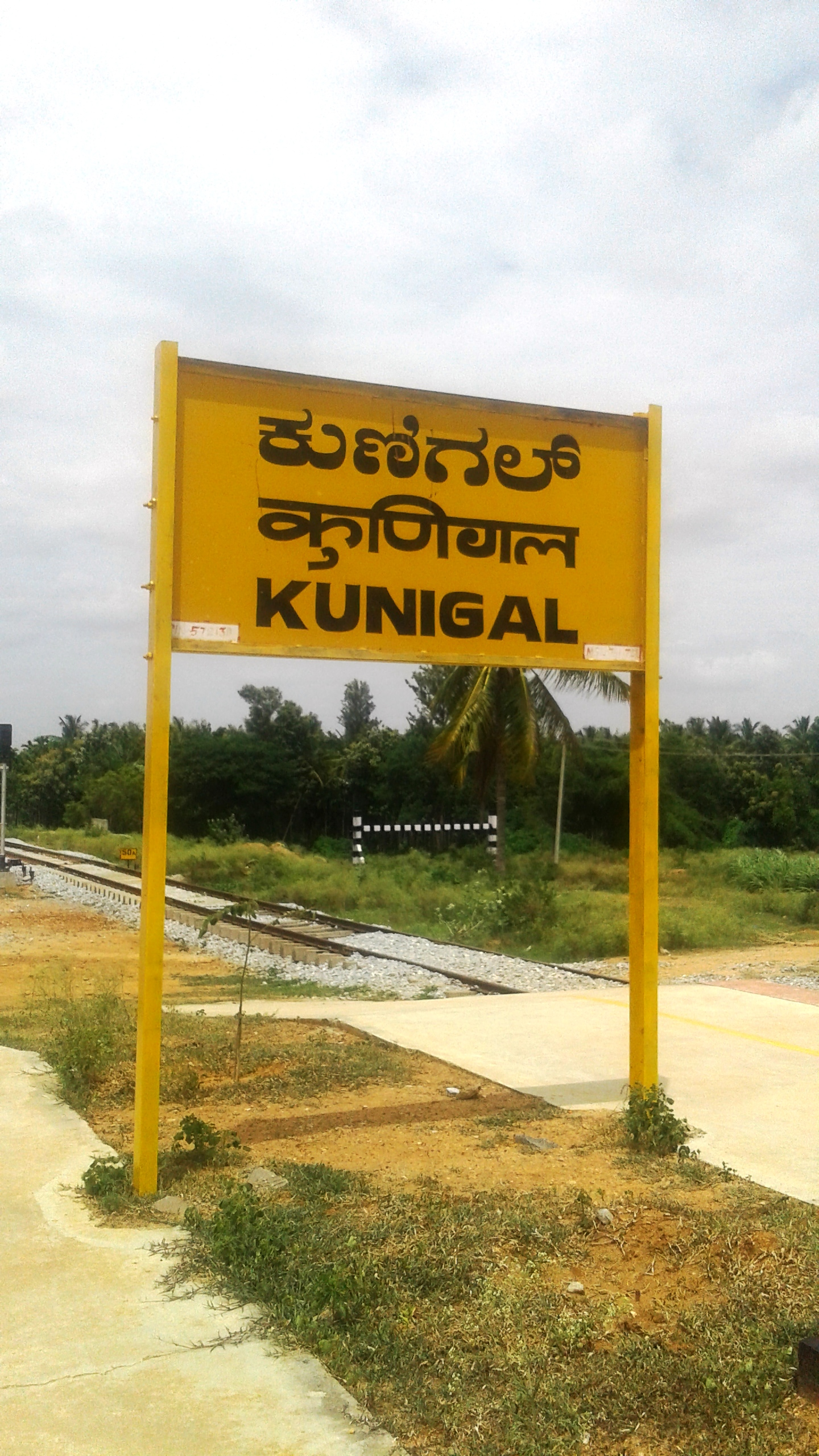
Kunigal

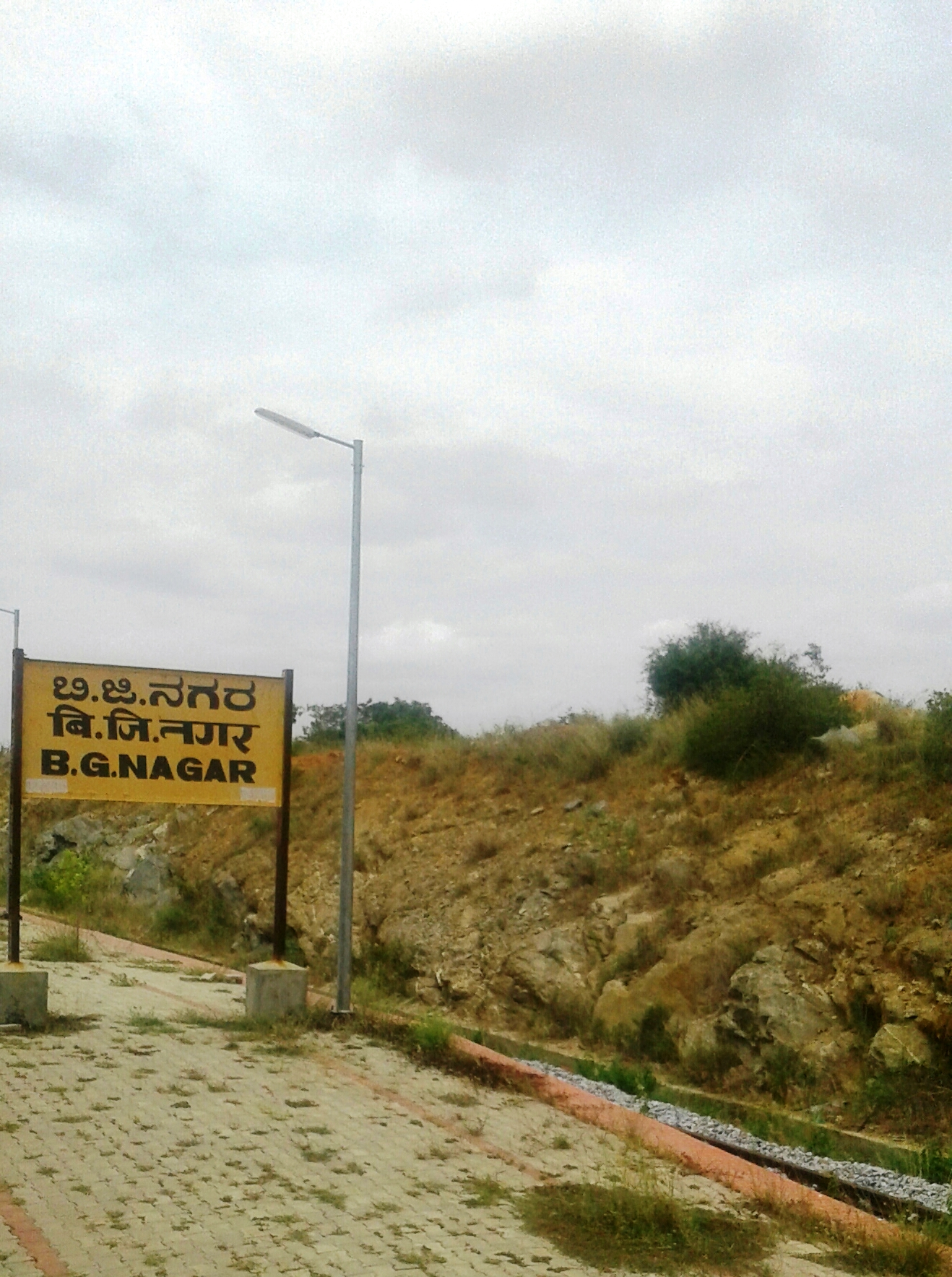
Bellur Cross

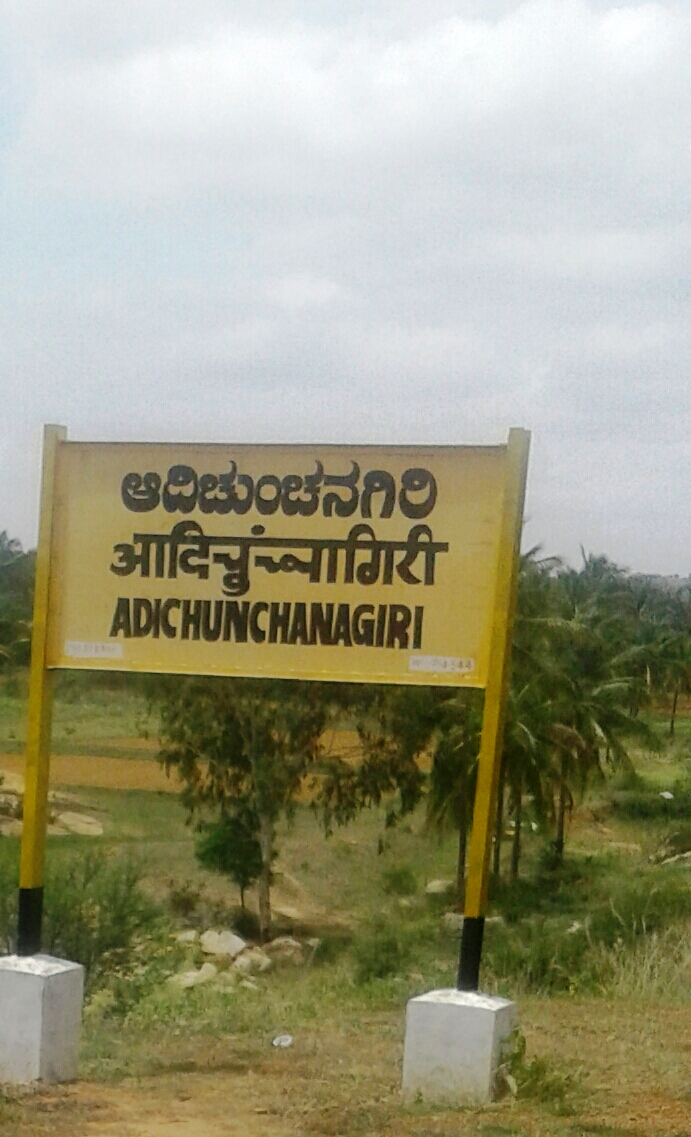
Adichunchanagiri
