= Uday Express =

Series of Indian trains

UDAY Express

Overview
- Service type: Superfast , Double Decker Express
- Status: Active
- First service: June 10, 2018
- Current operator: Indian Railways
- Website: http://irctc.co.in

On-board services
- Classes: CC, 2S
- Seating arrangements: Yes
- Sleeping arrangements: No
- Catering facilities: On-board café; Food vending machines
- Observation facilities: Large windows in all carriages
- Baggage facilities: Overhead racks
- Other facilities: Information screens; Small dining area

Technical
- Rolling stock: LHB coach rake
- Track gauge: Indian gauge 1,676 mm (5 ft 6 in)
- Operating speed: Avg: 62 km/h Max: 110 km/h
- Track owner: Indian Railways

UDAY Express or Utkrisht Double Decker Air Conditioned Yatri Express are completely Double-Decker AC chair car trains designed by RDSO. The coaches of the train have an anti-graffiti vinyl wrapped exterior and have been given a bright color scheme of yellow, orange and pink - somewhat similar to that of the Tejas Express. The train service has been envisioned as a 'luxury' train service for business travelers. According to Indian Railways, Uday Express will cater to the "busiest routes" and increase carrying capacity by 40%. These trains have a seating capacity of 120 per coach (50 for upper deck, 48 for lower deck and 22 on the ends) as compared to Shatabdis which can seat up to 78.

The first service was launched on June 10, 2018 between Coimbatore Junction and Bangalore. and it also have halts at Krishnarajapuram, Kuppam, Salem Jn, Erode Jn, Tiruppur Jn, Coimbatore Jn

The second service was launched on September 26, 2019 between Visakhapatnam and Guntur and have 7 stops en route.

== Active services ==
from 2018 till present time only 2 Uday Express services below they hauled by electrified locomotive WAP-7 :

Train no.	Train name	Distance	Frequency	Zone
22665/22666	KSR Bengaluru–Coimbatore Uday Express	419 km	Daily	Southern Railway
22701/22702	Visakhapatnam–Guntur Uday Express	384 km	5 days a week except Thu, Sun	South Coast Railway
