= Visakhapatnam–Guntur Uday Express =

Uday Express between Visakhapatnam and Vijayawada

Visakhapatnam – Guntur Uday Express

Overview
- Service type: Uday Express
- Locale: Andhra Pradesh
- First service: 26 September 2019; 6 years ago
- Current operator: South Coast Railway (SCoR)

Route
- Termini: Visakhapatnam (VSKP); Guntur Junction (GNT)
- Stops: 8
- Distance travelled: 384 km (239 mi)
- Average journey time: 7 hrs 40 mins
- Service frequency: 5 Days a week (except Sunday, Thursday)
- Train number: 22701 / 22702

On-board services
- Class: AC Chair Car
- Seating arrangements: Yes
- Sleeping arrangements: No
- Catering facilities: On-board catering
- Observation facilities: Large windows
- Entertainment facilities: No
- Baggage facilities: Yes

Technical
- Rolling stock: LHB-Uday
- Track gauge: 1,676 mm (5 ft 6 in)
- Operating speed: 55 km/h (34 mph) average including halts

The 22701 / 22702 Visakhapatnam–Guntur Uday Express is a Double-decker AC chair Car train of the Indian Railways connecting Visakhapatnam in Andhra Pradesh and Guntur in Andhra Pradesh. It was first introduced between Visakhapatnam and Vijayawada Jn. It was later extended up to Guntur Jn. It is currently being operated with 22701/22702 train numbers on five days a week. It operates at an average speed of 55 km/h.

== Coach composition ==
Utkrisht Double Decker Air Conditioned Yatri Express will be double-decker trains with 40% additional passenger capacity. They will run on busy route by Indian Railways with features of LED screen display to show information about stations, train speed etc. and will have announcement system as well, Vending machines for tea, coffee and milk, Bio toilets in compartments as well as CCTV cameras.

UDAY Express has a total of 10 coaches; 3 coaches with Dining facility with seating capacity of 104 Seats each and 5 coaches without dining with seating capacity of 120 seats. The remaining two will be power cars.

	1	2	3	4	5	6	7	8	9	10
22701		EOG	C1	C2	C3	C4	C5	C6	C7	SLR
22702		SLR	C7	C6	C5	C4	C3	C2	C1	EOG

== Service ==
It averages 50 km/h as 22701 Uday Express starts from Visakhapatnam, covering 381 km in 7 hrs 40 mins and 55 km/h as 22702 Uday Express starts from Guntur, covering 381 km in 6 hrs 55 min.

== Route & halts ==
1. Visakhapatnam
2. Duvvada
3. Anakapalle
4. Tuni
5. Samalkot Junction
6. Rajahmundry
7. Tadepalligudem
8. Eluru
9. Vijayawada Junction
10. Guntur Junction

== Traction ==
Both trains are hauled by a Visakhapatnam-based WAP-7 locomotive on its entire journey.

== See also ==
- Visakhapatnam–Tirupati Double Decker Express
- Uday Express
