= Chennai Central–Bangalore City line =

Railway line in India

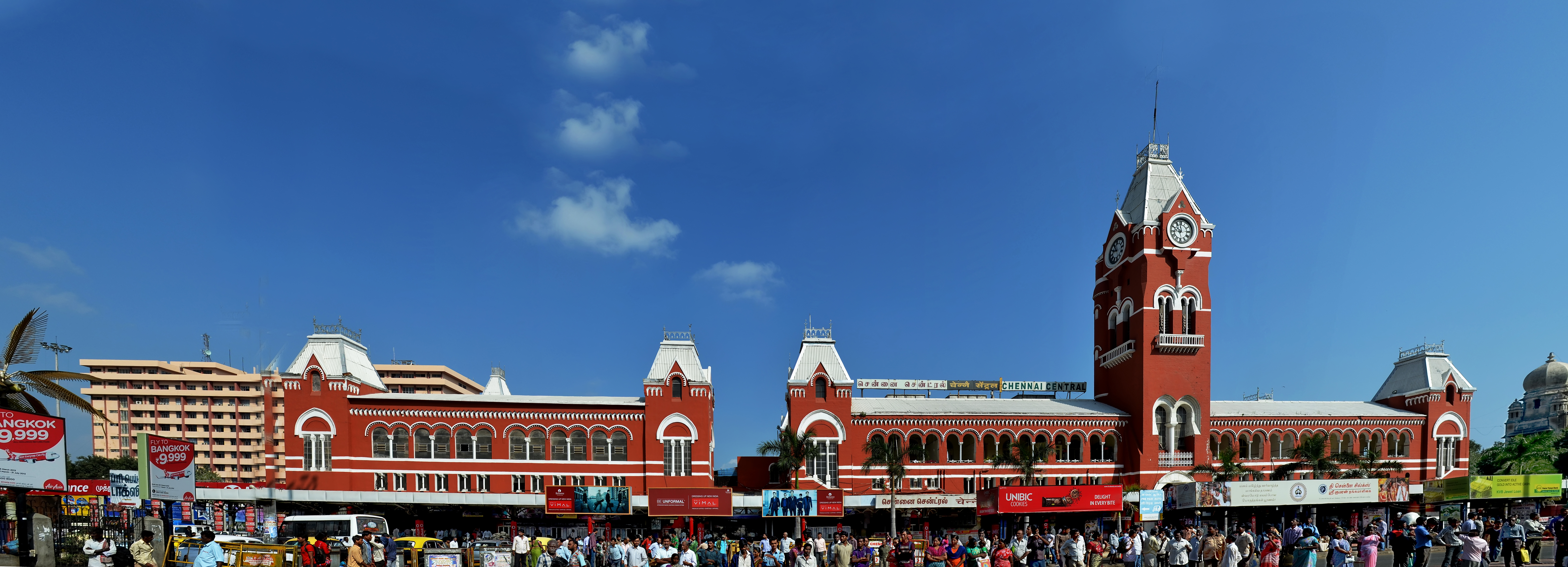
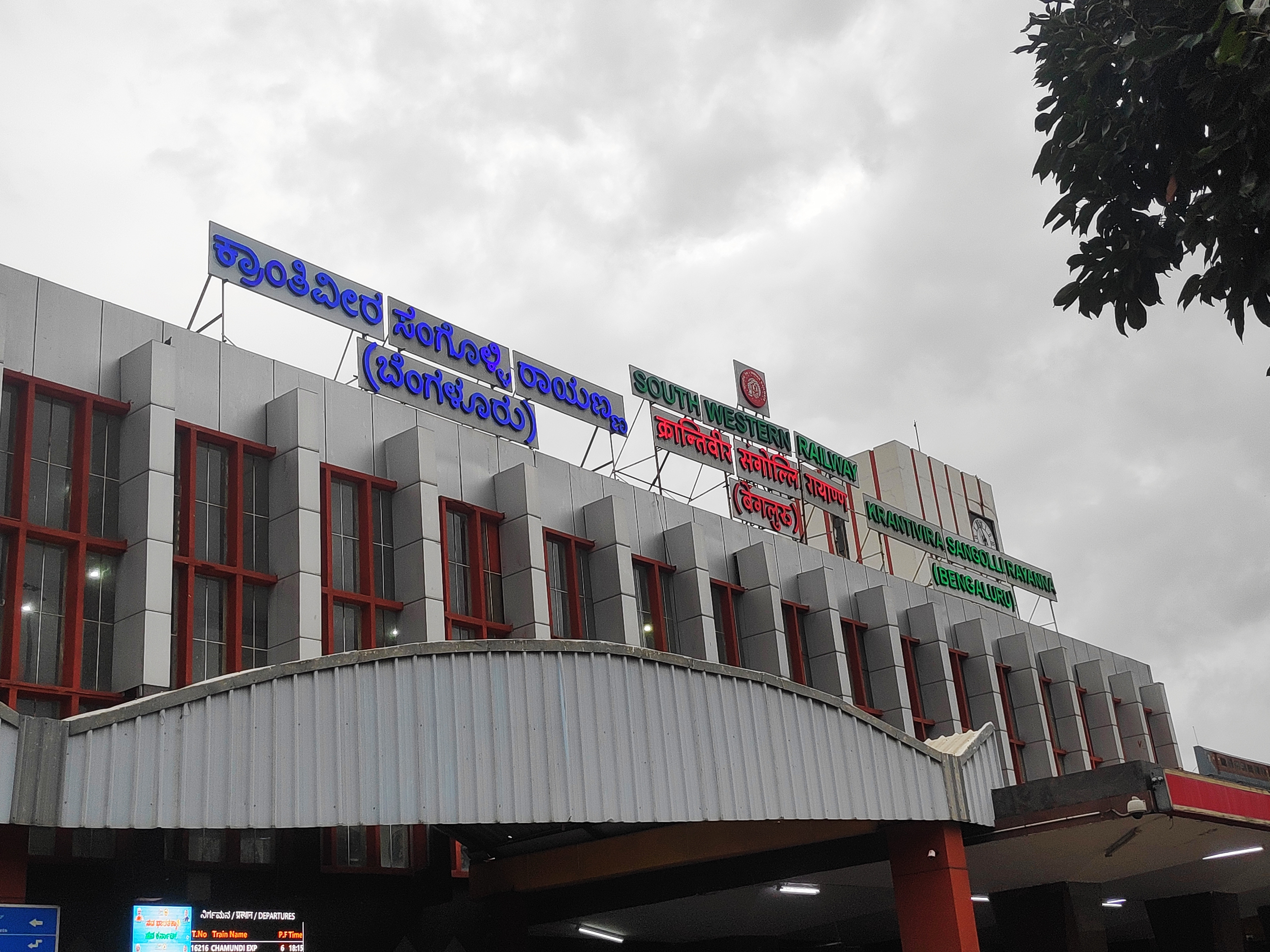
- Top to bottom: The termini, Chennai Central and KSR Bengaluru stations

Overview
- Status: Operational
- Owner: Indian Railways
- Locale: Tamil Nadu, Andhra Pradesh, Karnataka
- Termini: Chennai Central; KSR Bengaluru

Service
- Operator(s): Southern Railway; South Western Railway
- Depot(s): Arakkonam; Krishnarajapuram; Royapuram
- Rolling stock: WAP-1, WAP-4, WAP-5, WAP-7, WAG-7, WAG-9 electric locos; WDS-6, WDM-2, WDM-3A, WDP-4, WDG-3A, WDG-4 and WDS-4 diesel locos

History
- Opened: 1864; 162 years ago

Technical
- Line length: Full route Chennai-Chamarajanagar: 561 km (349 mi)
- Track length: Main line Chennai-Bengaluru: 361 km (224 mi) Branch lines: Bangarapet-Kolar-Yelahanka148 km (92 mi); KSR Bengaluru-Mysuru-Chamarajanagar 200 km (120 mi) Bangarpet-Marikuppam 16 km (9.9 mi)
- Track gauge: 5 ft 6 in (1,676 mm) broad gauge
- Electrification: Yes
- Operating speed: Up to 130 km/h
- Highest elevation: Chennai Central 8.5 m (28 ft), KSR Bengaluru 903 m (2,963 ft), Mysuru 543 m (1,781 ft)
Route map
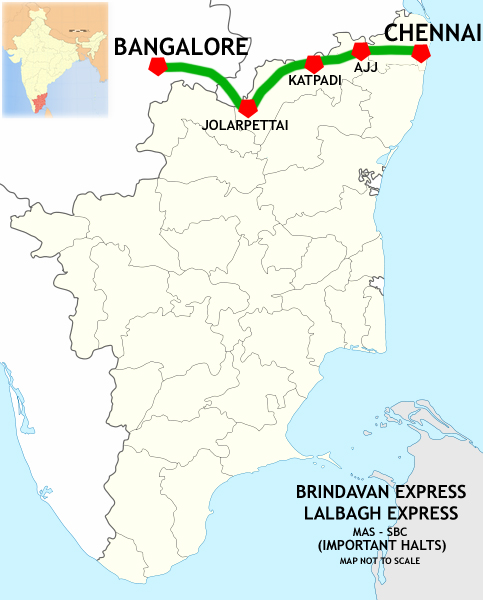

The Chennai Central – KSR Bengaluru line, previously known as Madras–Bangalore line, is an electrified railway double line which connects the cities of Chennai and Bengaluru in South India.

== History ==
The first train service in southern India and the third in India was operated by Madras Railway from Royapuram / Vyasarpadi to Walajah Road Railway Station, Ranipet in 1856. Madras Railway extended its trunk route to Beypur / Kadalundi (near Calicut) in 1861. Madras Railway connected Bangalore Cantonment to Jolarpettai on the newly constructed Beypur line in 1864. Bangalore Mail started running the same year. KSR Bengaluru was linked to Bangalore Cantonment in 1882. The 1,676 mm (5 ft 6 in)-wide 5 ft 6 in (1,676 mm) broad gauge Bangarpet-Marikuppam line came up in 1894. The 2 ft 6 in (762 mm)-wide narrow-gauge line between Bowringpet (later Bangarapet) and Kolar was opened in 1913 by Mysore State Railway. The narrow-gauge Yesvantpur–Yelahanka–Devanahalli–Chikkaballapura–Kolar line was opened in 1915 and was linked to Bengaluru in 1918. In 1925 Jolarpettai - KSR Bengaluru was made double line. With the completion of the gauge conversion to broad gauge of the Chikballapura-Kolar section in November 2013, the entire Bengaluru–Kolar section was ready for direct broad gauge trains. Gauge conversion of the Bangarpet–Kolar line was completed in 1997 and a Railbus service was operating since then, till 11 September 2016 when Railbus got replaced by an eight-bogie diesel–electric multiple unit (DEMU).

The Chennai–Tiruvallur sector was electrified in 1979–80, the Tiruvallur–Arakkonam–Chitteri sector in 1982–83, the Chitteri–Walajah Road (excl) sector in 1983–84, the Walajah Road–Katpadi sector in 1984–85, the Katpadi–Jolarpet sector in 1985–86, the Jolarpettai–Mulanur sector in 1990–91, the Mulanur–Bangarpet–Bengaluru sector in 1991–92.

In the early 1950s legislation was passed authorizing the central government to take over independent railway systems that were there. On 14 April 1951 the Madras and Southern Mahratta Railway, the South Indian Railway Company and Mysore State Railway were merged to form Southern Railway. Subsequently, Nizam's Guaranteed State Railway was also merged into Southern Railway. On 2 October 1966, the Secunderabad, Solapur, Hubballi and Vijayawada Divisions, covering the former territories of Nizam's Guaranteed State Railway and certain portions of Madras and Southern Mahratta Railway were separated from Southern Railway to form the South Central Railway. In 1977, Guntakal division of Southern Railway was transferred to South Central Railway and the Solapur division transferred to Central Railway. Amongst the seven new zones created in 2003 was South Western Railway, which was carved out of Southern Railway and South Central railway.

=== Chennai suburban services ===
EMU trains are operated between Puratchi Thalaivar Dr. M.G. Ramachandran Central railway station and Arakkonam Junction via West Line. It covers the distance of 68 km (42 mi) with 27 halts in a scheduled time of 1 hour 50 mins. As of 2005, 200,000 passengers daily used the EMU services in this sector.

== Speed limit ==
Chennai Central–Arakkonam–Jolarpet–KSR Bengaluru is classified as a "Group B" line and can take speeds up to 130 km/h.

== Sheds and workshops ==
Arakkonam earlier had a steam loco shed, and now has an electric loco shed that holds 162 locomotives as of February 2024, which include WAP-4, WAG-5 and WAG-9 locomotives.

Krishnarajapuram diesel loco and electric loco shed, opened in 1983, holds 258 locomotives as of February 2024. These include: WDS-6, WDM-3D, WDM-3A, WDP-4, WDG-3A, WDG-4, WAP-7 and WAG-9 locomotives. Currently, the shed gets direct allotment of new WAP-7 and WAG-9 locomotives from CLW, BLW and PLW.

Jolarpettai has an electric/ diesel trip shed.

The Carriage and Wagon Workshops at Perambur repairs coaches and wagons. The Locomotive Workshops at Perambur was the premier broad-gauge steam loco repair shop in the south. Even now, the workshop performs the annual overhaul of the Fairy Queen. The workshop now primarily handles the repair and maintenance of electric locomotives from all over the south and even beyond.

Basin Bridge has a carriage maintenance works. Avadi has a broad-gauge EMU maintenance and car shed. Arakkonam has engineering workshops.

== Passenger movement ==
Chennai Central, Katpadi Junction and KSR Bengaluru, on this line, are amongst the top hundred booking stations of Indian Railway.
