= Krishnarajapuram railway station =

Railway station in Karnakata, India

Krishnarajapuram
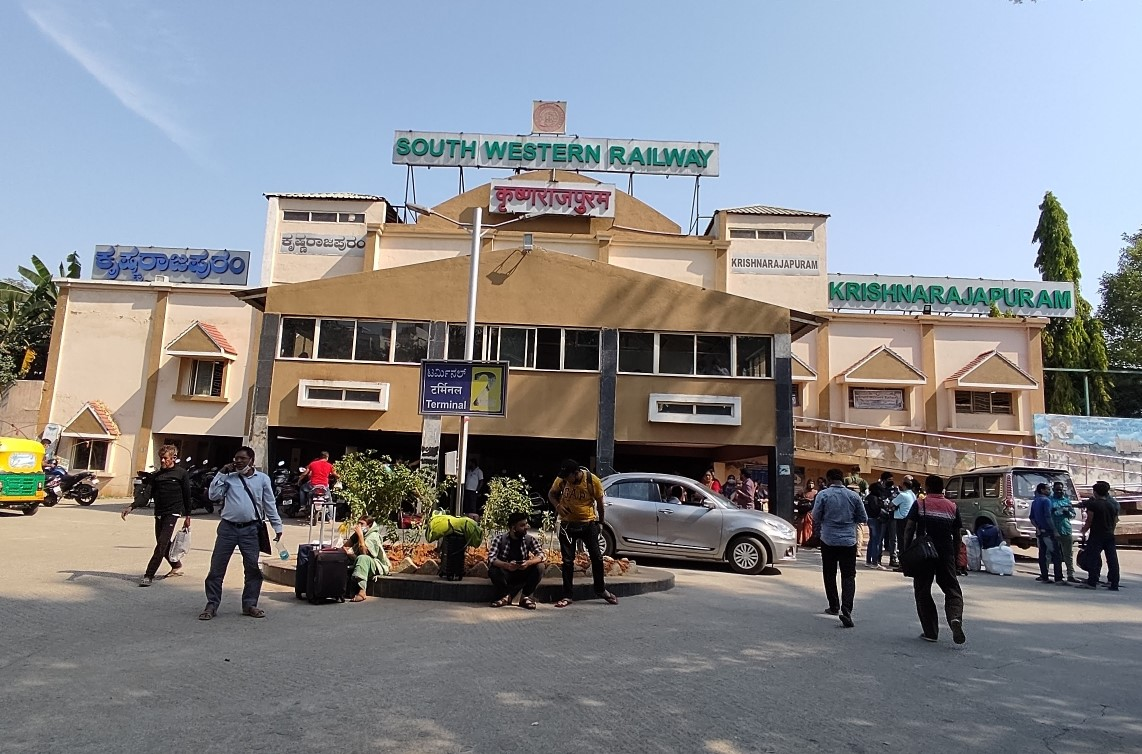
- Krishnarajapuram Railway station

General information
- Other names: Krishnarajapura K.R. Puram / K.R. Pura
- Location: Junction of OMR (NH 4) and Outer Ring Road, Krishnarajapura, Bengaluru, Karnataka; India
- Coordinates: 13.00065°N 77.67533°E
- Elevation: 903.26 m (2,963.5 ft)
- System: Indian Railways station
- Owner: Indian Railways
- Line: Chennai Central–Bangalore City line
- Platforms: 4
- Tracks: 5
- Connections: Purple Line Blue Line (under-construction) Krishnarajapura

Construction
- Structure type: At grade
- Parking: Yes
- Cycle facilities: Yes

Other information
- Status: Functioning
- Station code: KJM
- Zone(s): South Western Railway zone
- Division(s): Bengaluru

Services
Preceding station	Indian Railways	Following station
Baiyyappanahalli towards Bengaluru City	Chennai Central–Bangalore City line	Hoodi Halt towards Jolarpettai Junction or Chennai Central
Channasandra towards Yelahanka Junction	Chennai Central–Bangalore City line	Hoodi Halt towards Jolarpettai Junction or Chennai Central
Location

Krishnarajapuram railway station, also known as Krishnarajapura railway station (station code: KJM) is a suburban station located in Krishnarajapuram which is situated about 14 km away from KSR Bengaluru station. It is one of the important railway stations serving the Bengaluru metropolitan area and most of the trains have a stop here.

Some of the major routes include to the places of Howrah, Chennai Central, and Patna Jn. Some of the popular trains traveling to Bengaluru are Lal Bagh Express (12608) to Chennai, operating 7 times a week; Kanyakumari Express (16526) to Kanyakumari operating 7 times a week; Chennai operating 6 times a week (except Wednesdays) and (22625) Chennai–KSR Bengaluru Double Decker Express to Bengaluru operating 7 times a week.

== Location ==
Krishnarajapuram railway station (station code: KJM) is located at the junction of the Old Madras Road (NH 4) and Outer Ring Road, Bangalore. The cable-stayed bridge of Old Madras Road crosses the tracks just near the station.

== Gallery ==
Some of this railway station pictures are shown below:-

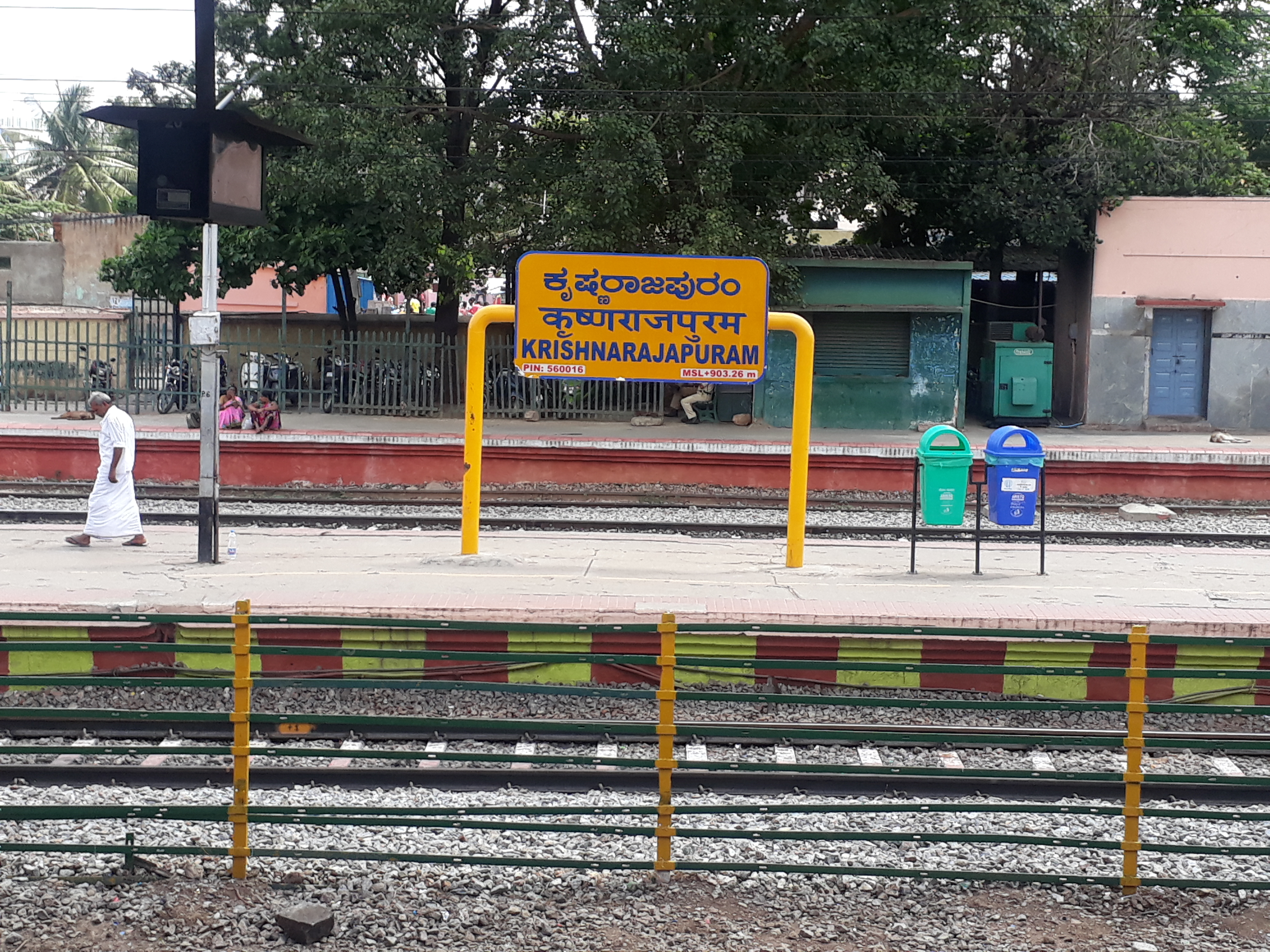
Station Platform

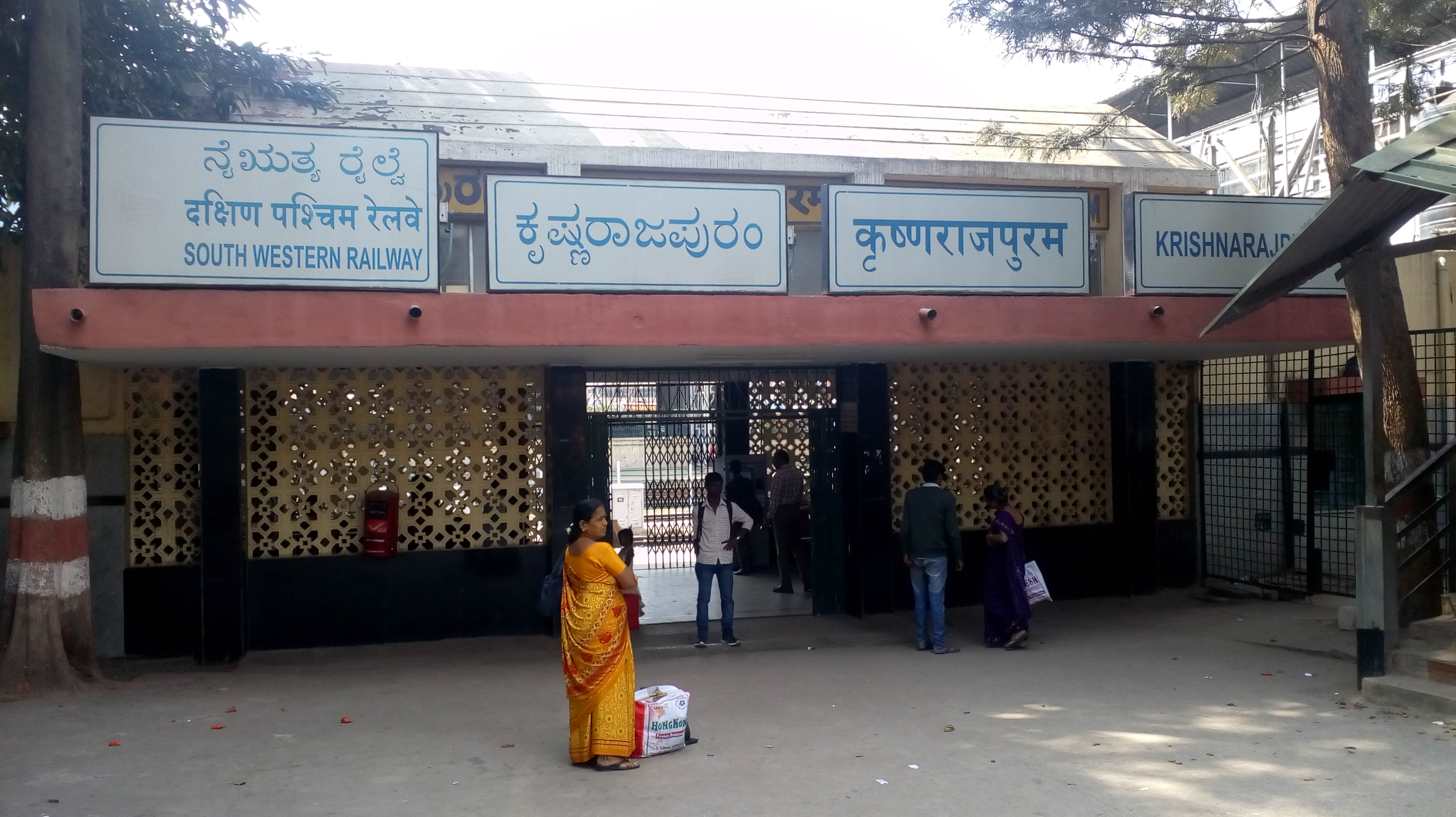
Back Entrance of KJM Railway Station

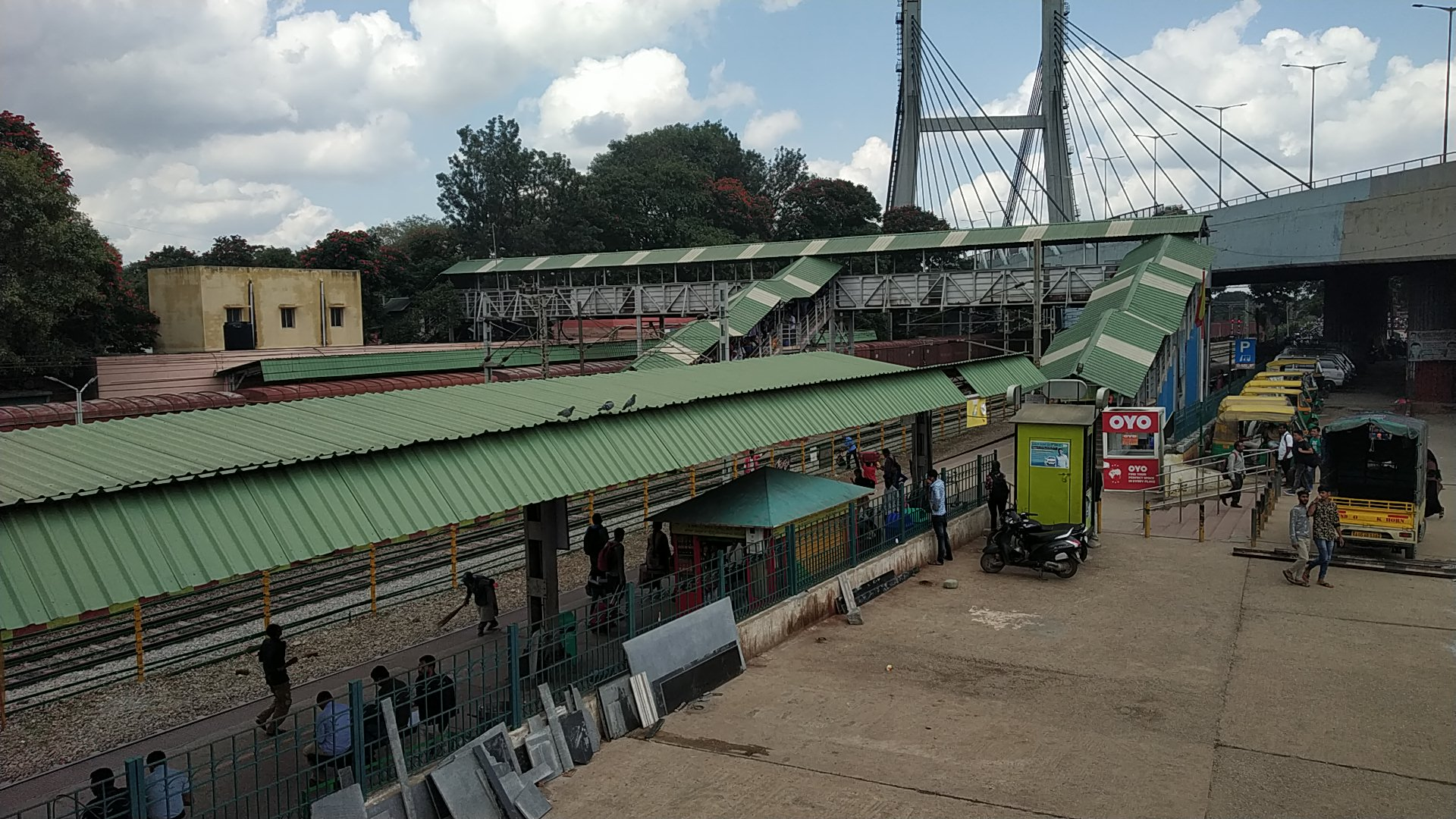
KR Puram Hanging Bridge

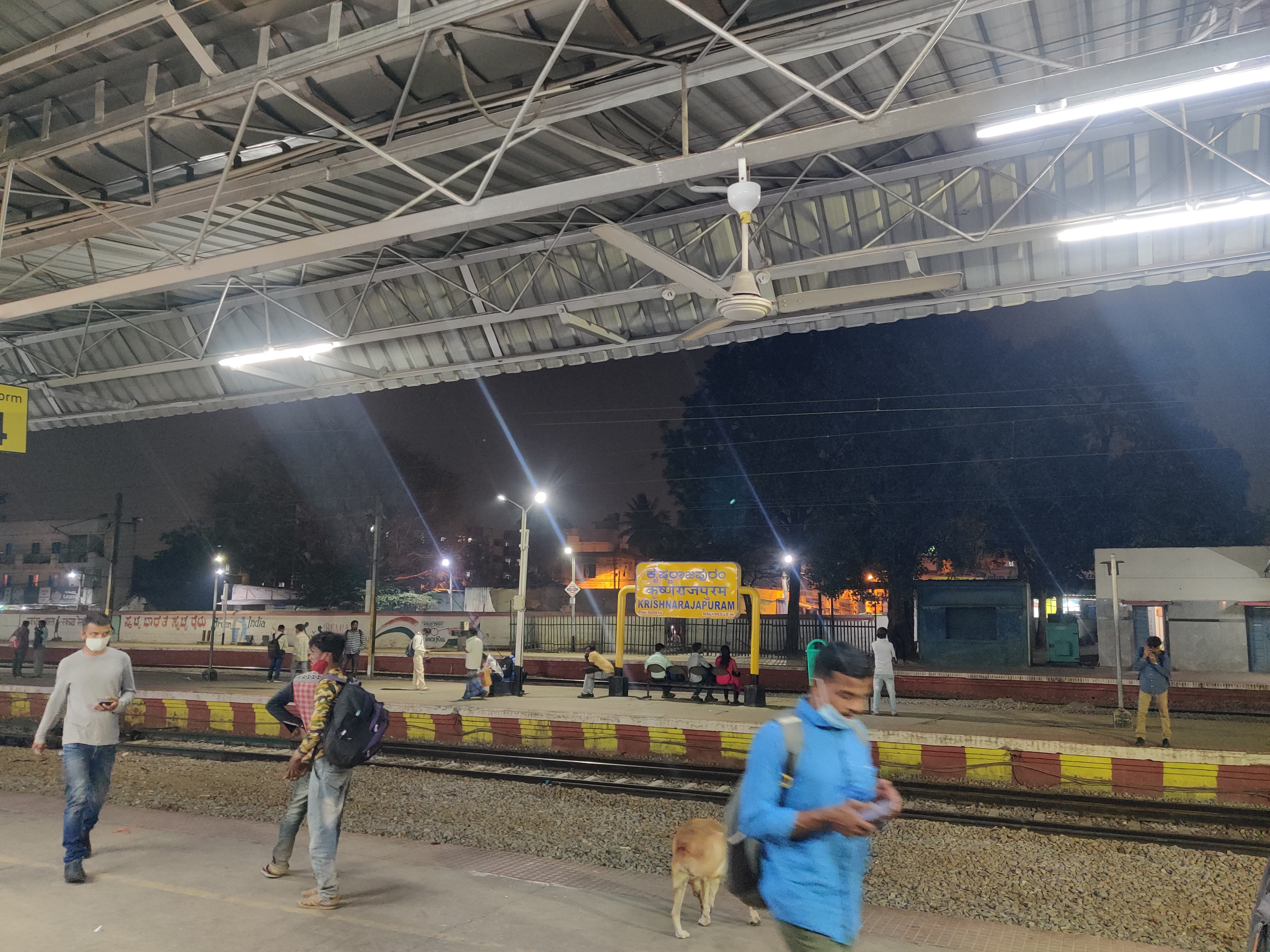
Night view Platform

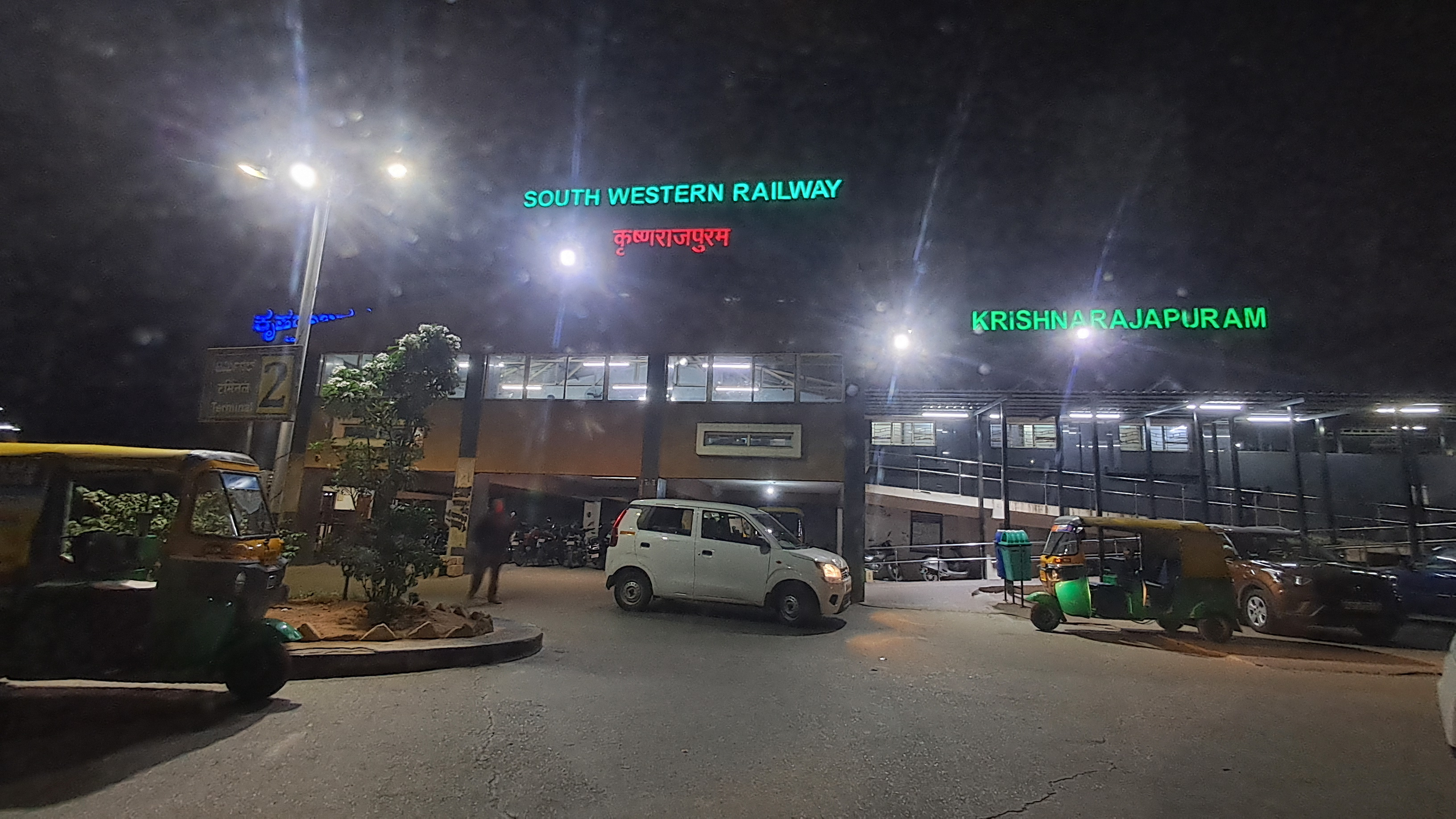
Front Entrance (Night view) as of March 2025

== Structure & expansion ==
Krishnarajapuram station has about 4 platforms and 2 thorough tracks for non-stopping trains. Most of the long-distance trains stop at platform 4, while incoming trains heading to Bangalore City stop at platform 3. Platform 1 is long enough only for eight coaches so it is used for goods and mail trains. And apart from that existing platforms could accommodate only 19 coaches whereas all the trains which stop here have 24 coaches which causes inconvenience to the passengers. So the extension of the platforms were approved by the railways which was completed in fifteen days.

== Junction ==
Krishnarajapuram railway station is a junction on the KSR Bengaluru–Chennai main line with a line from Guntakal joining the track into the station. However the Guntakal track is mostly used by freight trains and oil tankers from Whitefield, though a few express trains from Tamil Nadu and Kerala heading towards the north do use this line, bypassing KSR Bengaluru in the process. With the commencement of the Yesvantpur railway station all trains moving towards Bangarpet from yesvantpur are given a stop here.

=== Station layout ===
This station consists of 4 platforms and 4 tracks which are connected by foot overbridge for passengers to board the express trains at the respective platforms. These platforms are built to accumulate 24-coach express trains.

G	North Entrance Street level	Exit/Entrance & ticket counter
P	FOB, Side platform | P4 Not in Operation
P	Platform 1	Side Line (Not in Operation)
P	Platform 2	Towards → Jolarpettai Junction / MGR Chennai Central next station is Hoodi Halt
P	FOB, Island platform | P2 & P3 Doors will open on the right | P2 & P3 – MEMU & Express Lines
P	Platform 3	Towards ← KSR Bengaluru / Mysuru Junction
P	Platform 4	Towards ← KSR Bengaluru next station is Baiyyappanahalli
P	FOB, Side platform | P1 Doors will open on the left (Used for MEMUs and Express trains)
G	South Entrance Street level	Exit/Entrance & ticket counter

== Connectivity ==
This station is well connected to many parts of the city by BMTC buses. This station has two entrances to access it, the KR Puram – Outer Ring Road (South entrance) where the bus stops are and the other Vijinapura – KR Puram Market road (North entrance) which is far less crowded.

== See also ==
- Hoodi Halt railway station
