= Katpadi Junction railway station =

Railway station in Tamil Nadu, India

Vellore Katpadi Junction
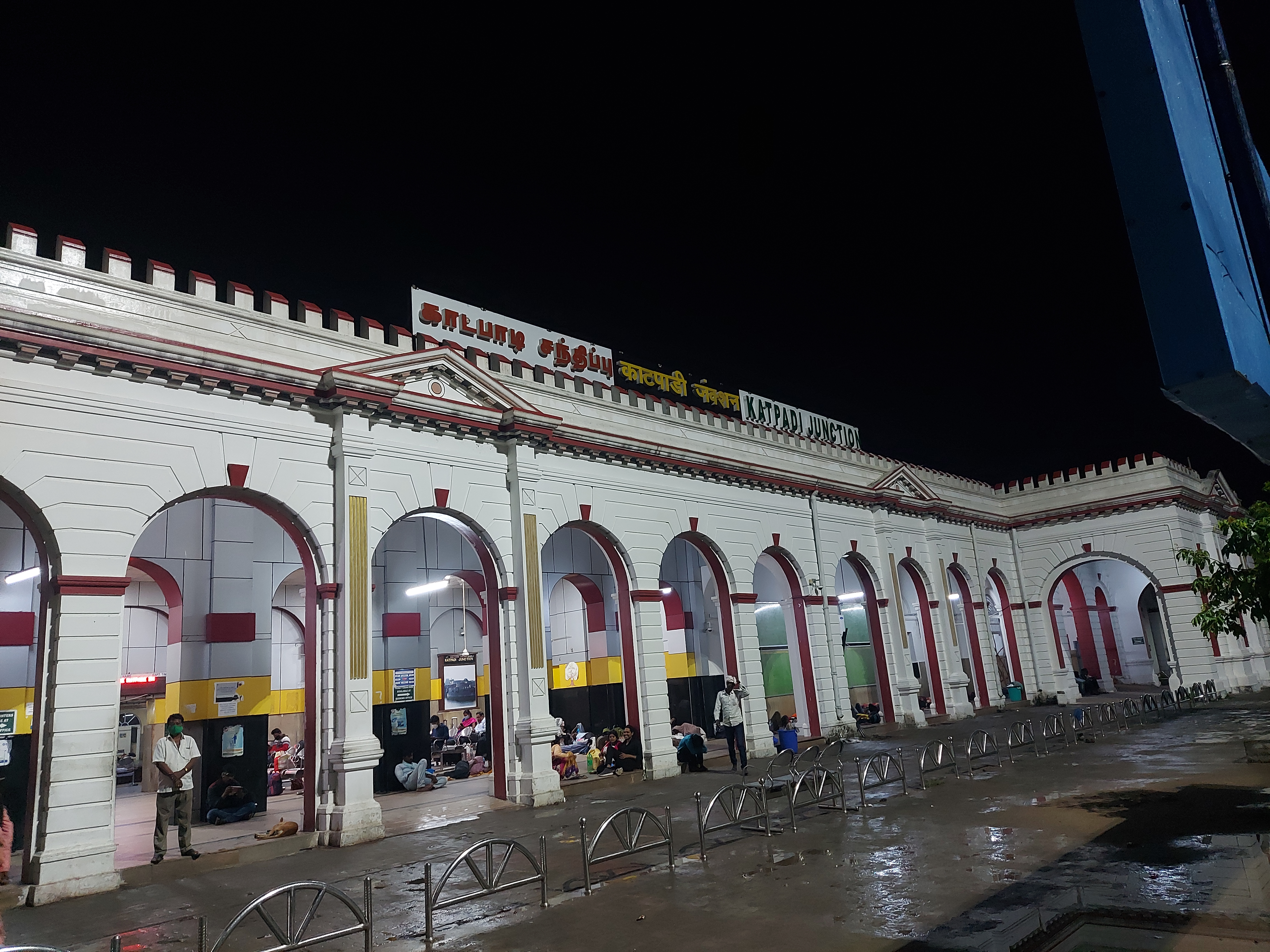
- Station entrance

General information
- Location: Vellore, Tamil Nadu; India
- Coordinates: 12°58′20″N 79°8′18″E
- Elevation: 213 metres (699 ft)
- System: Express train and passenger train station
- Owner: Indian Railways
- Operator: Southern Railway zone
- Lines: Chennai Central–Bangalore City line Gudur–Katpadi branch line Villupuram–Katpadi branch line
- Platforms: 5
- Tracks: 9
- Connections: Bus interchange

Construction
- Parking: Yes
- Cycle facilities: Yes
- Accessible: Disabled access

Other information
- Status: Functioning
- Station code: KPD
- Fare zone: Indian Railways

Services
Preceding station	Indian Railways	Following station
Jolarpet Junction towards Bangalore City	Chennai Central–Bangalore City line	Arakkonam Junction towards Chennai Central
Route map
Location
- Location within Tamil Nadu Location within India
- Interactive map

Katpadi Junction railway station(station code: KPD), is an NSG–2 category Indian railway station in Chennai railway division of Southern Railway zone.

Katpadi Junction is the primary terminus and junction of Fort City Vellore. Katpadi is the eighth highest revenue earning railway station in the Southern railway.

Platforms 1 and 2 are primarily used for trains running between Chennai and Bangalore/Trivandrum while platforms 3, 4, and 5 are used for trains running towards Tirupati and Villupuram .

== Trains ==
Nearly 259 trains halt at this junction. Katpadi junction is the railway station in Tamil Nadu, where highest number of trains stop. Major commuters to Katpadi station are people who travel to Vellore Golden Temple, CMC Hospital and VIT University. On an average it serves approximately 18,000 passengers daily, with 11 originating trains and 67 passing. Three Shatabdi Expresses (Chennai–Coimbatore, Chennai–Bangalore and Chennai–Mysore), two Vande Bharat Express(Chennai-Mysuru), and one Double Decker Express (Chennai–Bangalore) have halts here.

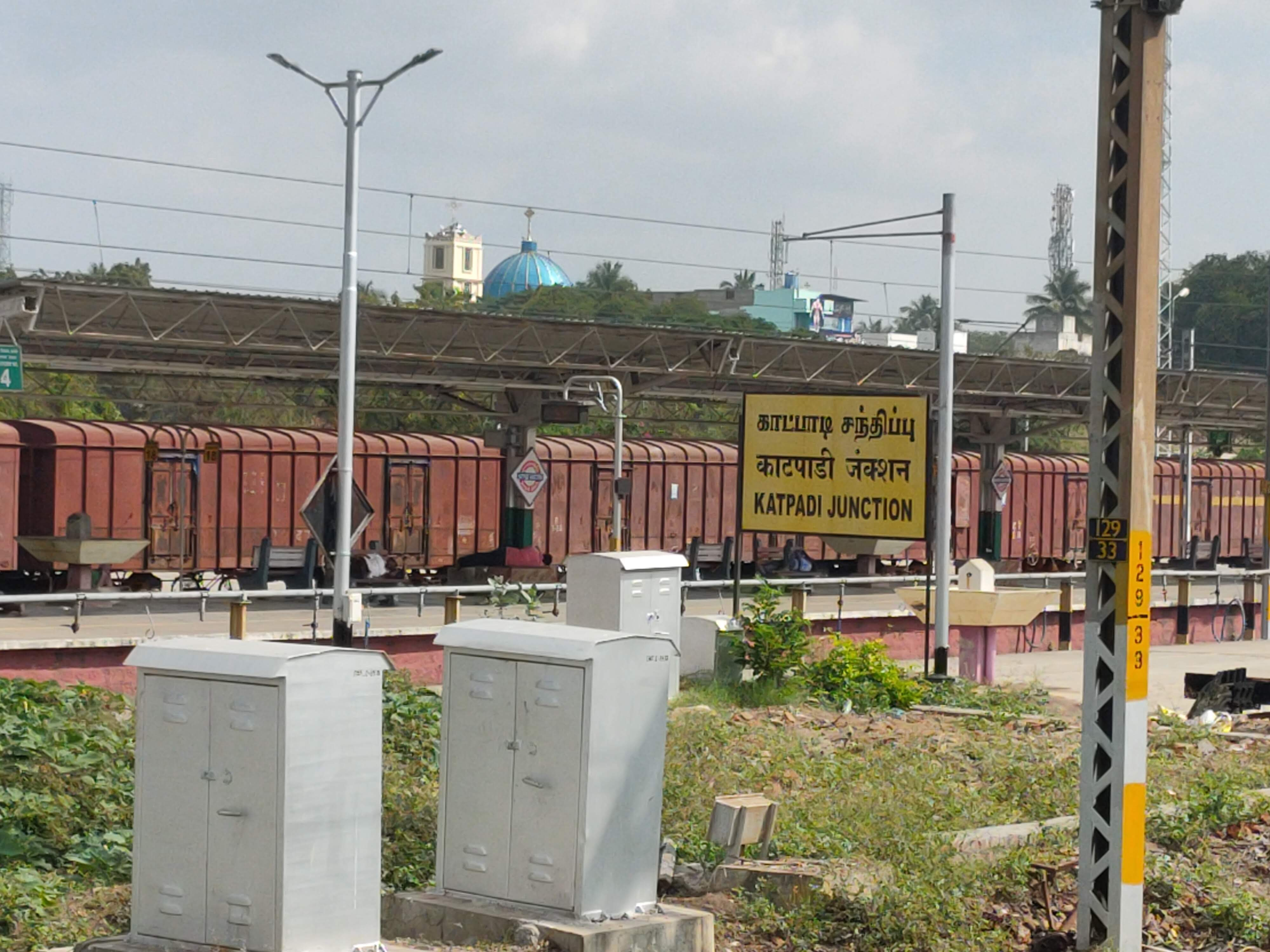
Katpadi Junction board

== Projects and development ==
It is one of the 73 stations in Tamil Nadu to be named for upgradation under Amrit Bharat Station Scheme of Indian Railways.

== See also ==
- Vellore Cantonment
- Vellore
- List of areas of Vellore
- Vellore (Lok Sabha constituency)
