= Jolarpettai Junction railway station =

Railway Junction in Tamil Nadu, India

Jolarpettai Junction
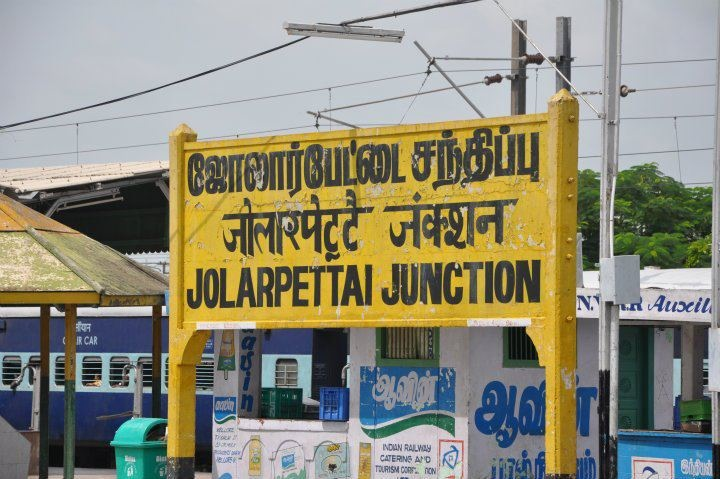
- Jolarpettai Junction

General information
- Location: Tirupattur–Vaniyambadi Road, Jolarpettai Junction, Tirupattur district, Tamil Nadu; India
- Coordinates: 12°33′33″N 78°34′36″E
- Elevation: 417 metres (1,368 ft)
- System: Indian Railways station
- Owner: Indian Railways
- Lines: Chennai Central–Bangalore City line Jolarpettai–Shoranur line
- Platforms: 5

Construction
- Parking: Available
- Cycle facilities: Available

Other information
- Status: Active
- Station code: JTJ
- Fare zone: Southern Railways

Services
Preceding station	Indian Railways	Following station
Bangarapet towards Bangalore City	Chennai Central–Bangalore City line	Katpadi Junction towards Chennai Central
Location
- Location within Tamil Nadu Location within India

Jolarpettai Junction (also known as Tirupattur - Jolarpet Junction)(station code: JTJ) is an NSG–3 category Indian railway station in Chennai railway division of Southern Railway zone. It is located in the Tirupattur district of Tamil Nadu. Jolarpettai Junction falls within Chennai Central- Bangalore City Line via Bangarapet Junction, Krishnarajapuram and Jolarpettai–Shoranur line leading to Kerala trunk via Salem Jn, Erode Jn, Coimbatore Jn, Palakkad Jn and hence connect Chennai to Mangalore through ShoranurJn, Kozhikode and Kannur. Chennai to Thiruvananthapuram through Thrissur, Ernakulam Jn and Kollam Jn .

== Lines ==
- Double electrified BG line Towards Katpadi Junction (East)
- Double electrified BG line Towards Bangarapet Junction (West)
- Double electrified BG line Towards Salem Junction (South)

== Trains ==
Around 190 trains stop here and pass to Salem Junction, Bangalore City and Katpadi junction.

== Projects and development ==
It is one of the 73 stations in Tamil Nadu to be named for upgradation under Amrit Bharat Station Scheme of Indian Railways.
