= Bengaluru City railway station =

Railway station in Bengaluru, India

Bengaluru City Krantivira Sangolli Rayanna Bengaluru
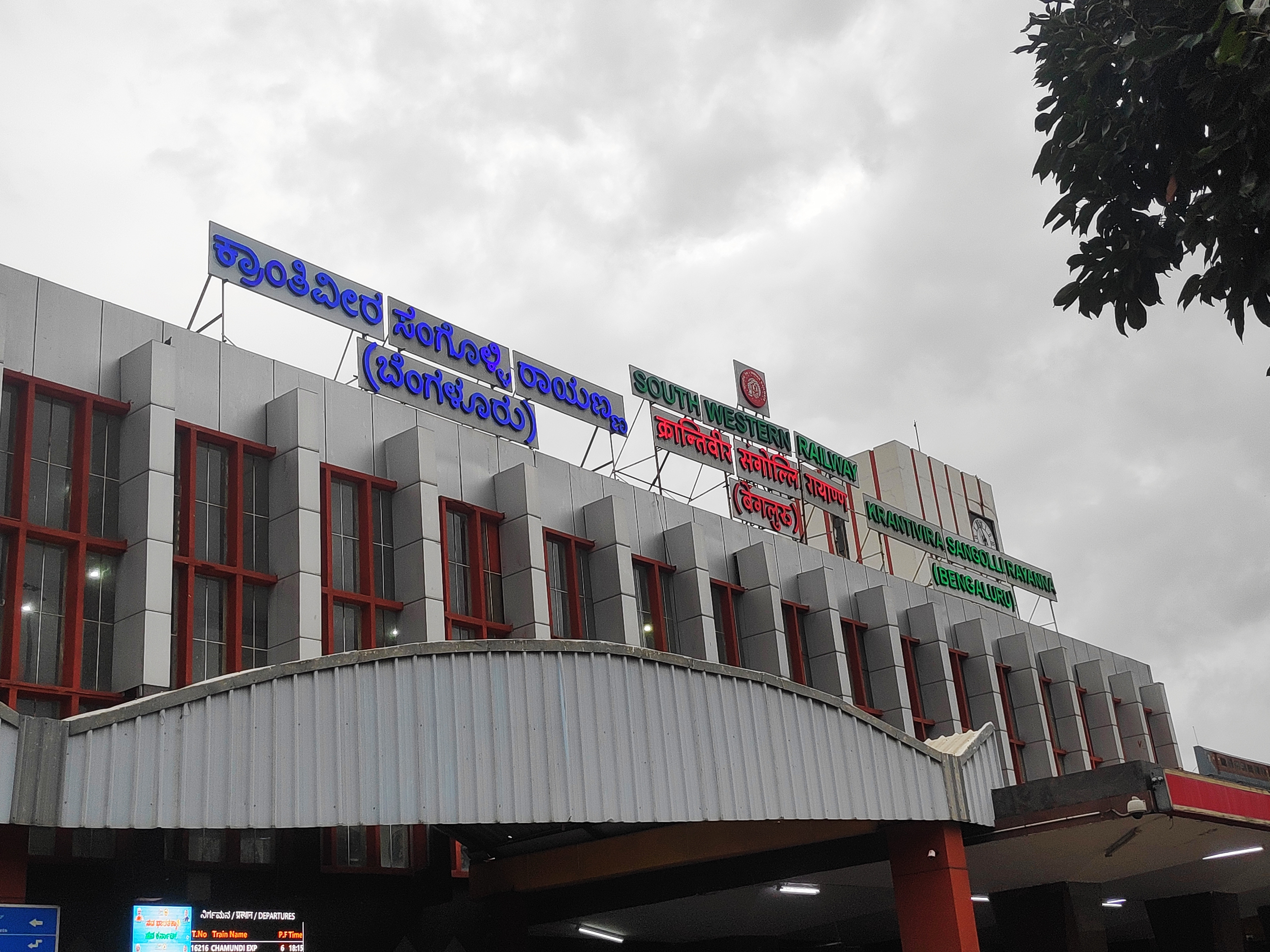
- Main entrance

General information
- Other names: KSR Bengaluru, Majestic
- Location: Gubbi Thotadappa Road, Bengaluru, Karnataka; India
- Coordinates: 12°58′42″N 77°34′10″E
- Elevation: 920 m (3,020 ft)
- System: Indian Railways station
- Owner: Indian Railways
- Operator: South Western Railway zone of the Indian Railways
- Lines: Bangalore–Chennai; Bangalore–Guntakal; Bangalore–Hassan; Bangalore–Arsikere–Hubli; Bangalore–Mysore; Bangalore–Hosur–Salem
- Platforms: 10
- Tracks: 15
- Connections: BMTC (Majestic); Purple Line (City Railway Station); Green Line Purple Line (Majestic)

Construction
- Structure type: At–ground
- Parking: Available
- Accessible: Disabled access

Other information
- Status: Functioning
- Station code: SBC
- Zone(s): South Western Railway zone
- Division(s): Bangalore

History
- Opened: 1968; 58 years ago
- Former names: Bangalore City railway station (1968–2016)

Passengers
- 300,000/day
Location
- Location within Bengaluru
- Interactive map

Bengaluru City Railway Station, officially Krantivira Sangolli Rayanna Bengaluru Station (Note: , also known as Bangalore City Railway Station, KSR Bengaluru, or Majestic Railway station) (station code: SBC), is a railway station in Bengaluru, Karnataka, India. It is the busiest railway station in the South Western Railway zone of the Indian Railways, and is the only NSG1 category railway station in the zone. The station has 10 platforms and three entrances. It is named after Sangolli Rayanna.

== History ==
The establishment of the British Cantonment in 1809 created a need for better transport links with Madras, the administrative headquarters of the Madras Presidency. During the 1840s, several railway proposals were discussed in the British Parliament. Mark Cubbon, the Commissioner of Mysore and Coorg, proposed a railway connecting Mysore with Madras via Bangalore, but the plan was initially stalled. Later, under Commissioner Lewin Bentham Bowring, the Mysore government donated land for the railway project and the Madras Railway completed the railway line connecting Bangalore Cantonment and Royapuram in 1864. The railway line, which was first intended for military transport, was eventually opened to the public, and the Bangalore Mail, connecting Bangalore and Madras operated for the first time later the same year. The railway connectivity boosted trade and immigration.

The rail network was nationalised in 1944 and on 14 April 1951, the Madras and Southern Mahratta Railway, the South Indian Railway and Mysore State Railway were merged to form the Southern Railway zone of the Indian Railways. The Bangalore City railway was opened in 1968. To improve administration and enhance monitoring, the Bengaluru railway division was created on 27 July 1981. In 2003, the South Western Railway zone was formed, and the station became part of the newly formed zone. In 2015, the station was renamed Krantiveera Sangolli Rayanna Bangalore Station in 2016 in honour of the Indian freedom fighter Sangolli Rayanna.

== Infrastructure and facilities ==
The station has 10 platforms and three entrances. The station connects to several major railway lines–Chennai Central–Bangalore City, Mysore–Bangalore, Bangalore–Arsikere–Hubli, Guntakal–Bangalore, Salem–Hosur–Bangalore, and Hassan–Bangalore. The railway lines are double-tracked and electrified. There are 180+ train services from the station.

The station has numerous licensed food stalls, modernised digital lockers, facilities for the disabled, and child-friendly spaces. The station features a public aquarium called Aquatic Kingdom which has been functional since 1 July 2021. It includes a 12-foot-long movable tunnel aquarium.

== Connectivity ==
The railway station is served by Krantivira Sangolli Rayanna Railway Station metro station on the Namma Metro's Purple Line, which opened on 30 April 2016. Later that year, the Bangalore Metro Rail Corporation announced that a foot over bridge would be constructed from the metro station until the boundary of the railway station, with the South Western Railway taking up the responsibility of connecting it to the station platforms. The bridge connecting to platform 10 was opened on 18 February 2019, and Namma Metro reported that monthly ridership at the metro station, which was 175,000 passengers per day prior to opening the bridge, increased to 250,000 two months after its opening. The railway station is served by the Kempegowda Bus Station.

The station will be a major hub in the Bengaluru Suburban Railway, which is under construction. The Sampige Line will originate at the station and run northwards via Yeshwanthpur to the Kempegowda International Airport. The Parijaata Line will connects Kengeri in the west to Whitefield in the east via the station.
