= Yercaud Express =

Train in India

Yercaud Superfast Express

Overview
- Service type: Superfast
- Locale: Tamil Nadu
- First service: 1 October 1996; 29 years ago
- Current operator: Southern Railway

Route
- Termini: MGR Chennai Central (MAS); Erode Junction (ED)
- Stops: 10
- Distance travelled: 394 km (245 mi)
- Average journey time: 6 hours 50 minutes
- Service frequency: Daily
- Train number: 22649 / 22650

On-board services
- Classes: AC First Class, AC 2 Tier, AC 3 Tier, Sleeper Class, General Unreserved
- Disabled access: Disabled access
- Seating arrangements: Yes
- Sleeping arrangements: Yes
- Catering facilities: E-catering
- Observation facilities: Large Windows
- Baggage facilities: Available
- Other facilities: Below the seats

Technical
- Rolling stock: LHB coach
- Track gauge: 1,676 mm (5 ft 6 in)
- Operating speed: 59 km/h (37 mph) average including halts.
Route map
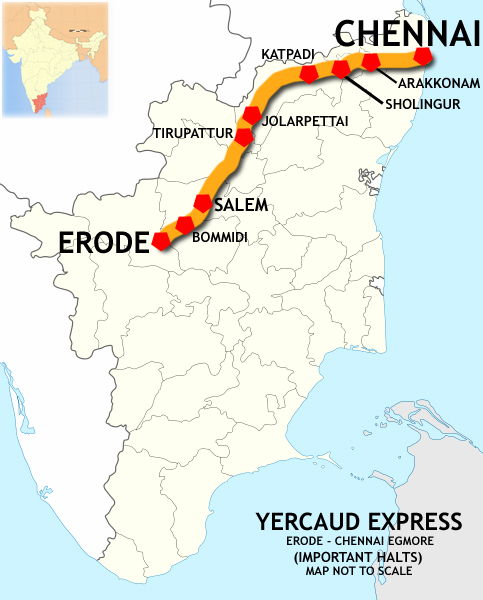

The 22649 / 22650 Yercaud Superfast Express is a Superfast express train operated by the Southern Railway zone of the Indian Railways, connecting Erode and Chennai in Tamil Nadu.

== Name ==
This train traces its name to the Yercaud hills near Salem. Salem is at the foothills of Yercaud

== Coach composition ==
The train runs consists of 23 carriages:

| Loco | 1 | 2 | 3 | 4 | 5 | 6 | 7 | 8 | 9 | 10 | 11 | 12 | 13 | 14 | 15 | 16 | 17 | 18 | 19 | 20 | 21 | 22 | 23 |
|---|---|---|---|---|---|---|---|---|---|---|---|---|---|---|---|---|---|---|---|---|---|---|---|
| | SLR | UR | HA1 | A1 | A2 | B1 | B2 | B3 | S1 | S2 | S3 | S4 | S5 | S6 | S7 | S8 | S9 | S10 | S11 | S12 | UR | UR | SLR |

== Loco link ==
It is hauled by a WAP-4 electric locomotive from Erode Loco Shed.

== Schedule ==
22649 - M.G.R Chennai Central → Erode ~ Yercaud Superfast Express
| Station/Junction Name | Station Code | Arrival | Departure | Day |
|---|---|---|---|---|
| M.G.R Chennai Central | SOURCE | MAS | 23:00 | 1 |
| Perambur | PER | 23:14 | 23:15 | 1 |
| Tiruvallur | TRL | 23:43 | 23:45 | 1 |
| Arakkonam Junction | AJJ | 00:03 | 00:05 | 2 |
| Katpadi Junction | KPD | 00:53 | 00:55 | 2 |
| Jolarpettai Junction | JTJ | 02:05 | 02:10 | 2 |
| Tirupattur | TPT | 02:19 | 02:20 | 2 |
| Morappur | MAP | 02:59 | 03:00 | 2 |
| Bommidi | BQI | 03:24 | 03:25 | 2 |
| Salem Junction | SA | 04:12 | 04:15 | 2 |
| Sangagiri | SGE | 04:54 | 04:55 | 2 |
| Erode Junction | ED | 05:50 | DEST | 2 |
22650 - Erode → M.G.R Chennai Central ~ Yercaud Superfast Express
| Erode Junction | ED | | 21:00 | 1 |
| Sangagiri | SGE | 21:24 | 21:25 | 1 |
| Salem Junction | SA | 21:57 | 22:00 | 1 |
| Bommidi | BQI | 22:34 | 22:35 | 1 |
| Morappur | MAP | 22:59 | 23:00 | 1 |
| Samalpatti | SLY | 23:23 | 23:25 | 1 |
| Tirupattur | TPT | 23:44 | 23:45 | 1 |
| Jolarpettai Junction | JTJ | 00:08 | 00:10 | 2 |
| Katpadi Junction | KPD | 01:18 | 01:20 | 2 |
| Arakkonan Junction | AJJ | 02:08 | 02:10 | 2 |
| Tiruvallur | TRL | 02:33 | 02:35 | 2 |
| Perambur | PER | 03:08 | 03:10 | 2 |
| M.G.R Chennai Central | MAS | 03:40 | DEST | 2 |

== See also ==
- Yelagiri Express
- Cheran Express
- Blue mountain Express
- Coimbatore chennai central weekly express
- Coimbatore Express
- Kovai Express
- Pearl City (Muthunagar) Superfast Express
- Nellai Superfast Express
- Coimbatore shadabti express
- Salem chennai express
