= Coimbatore–Rameswaram Express =

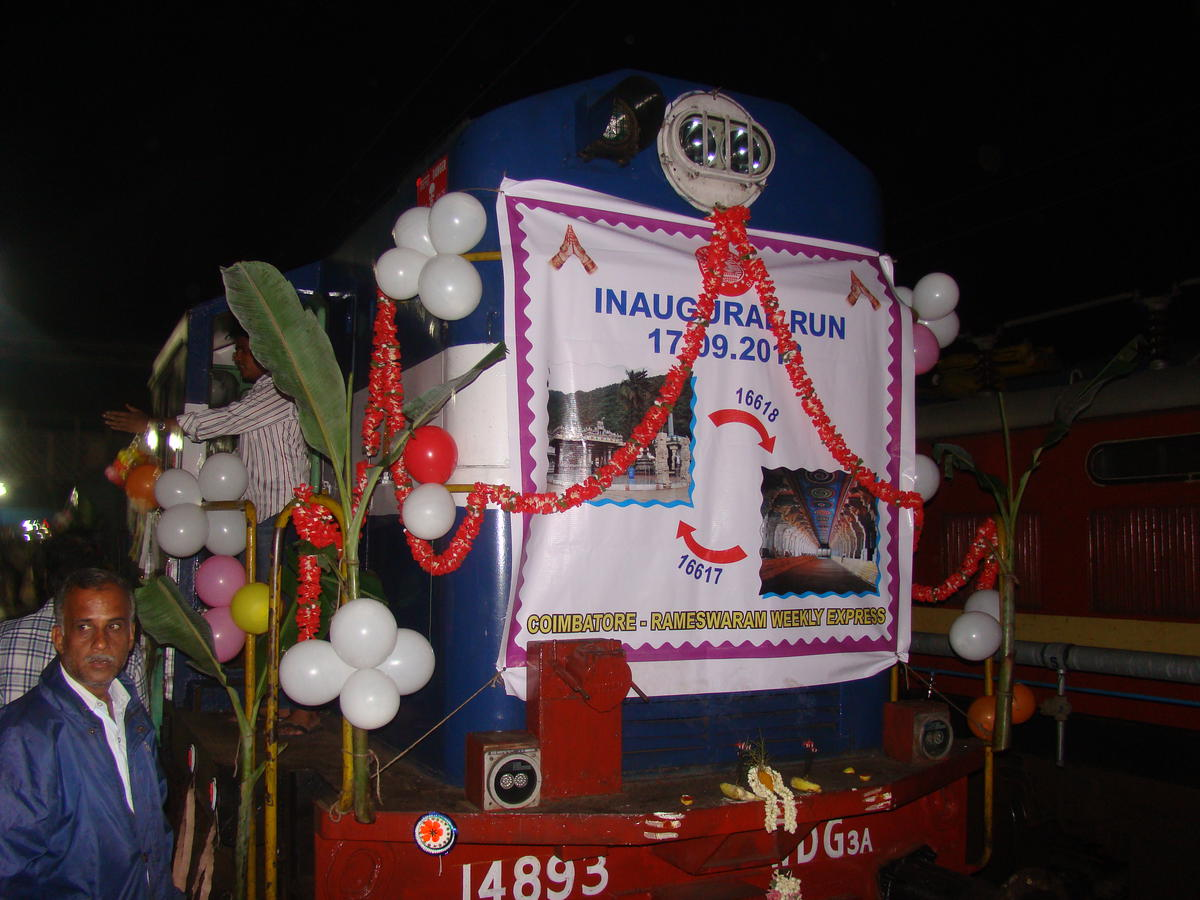
- Inauguration ceremony of Coimbatore Rameswaram Express at Coimbatore Junction

Overview
- Service type: Express
- Locale: Tamil Nadu
- First service: 17 September 2013
- Current operator: Southern Railways

Route
- Termini: Coimbatore city Junction; Rameswaram
- Stops: 14
- Distance travelled: 507.5 km (315.3 mi)
- Average journey time: 11 hours 40 minutes
- Service frequency: Weekly
- Train number: 16617/16618

On-board services
- Classes: AC Two Tier, AC Three Tier, Sleeper Class, General Unreserved, SLR.
- Seating arrangements: Yes
- Sleeping arrangements: Yes
- Catering facilities: No

Technical
- Track gauge: 1,676 mm (5 ft 6 in)
- Electrification: 25kV
- Operating speed: 46 km/h (29 mph) average with halts
- Rake maintenance: Coimbatore Junction
- Rake sharing: Rajkot–Coimbatore Express

Coimbatore–Rameswaram express (Train Nos 16617/16618) is an express weekly train run by Indian Railways between Coimbatore city Junction and Rameswaram. The train made its inaugural run on 17 September 2013.

== History ==
This train is mainly introduce to compensate the Coimbatore Rameswaram daily Meter Gauge express via Madurai, Pollachi since this train has been discontinued due to gauge conversion of dindigul-pollachi line. Though gauge conversion completed, it never restored till date (but ran as a limited run festival special train after gauge conversion for a period of 1 month). So this train(16617/16618) will run to compensate the Meter Gauge express.

This train was initially operated as a summer special service from April to June 2012 on Saturdays and Sundays in the number 06010 and 06009 by using the lie over rakes of Kongu Express. But during regularisation of this summer special service, Rajkot express lie-over rakes were allotted due to which the weekend service has been turned into week days service and the Kongu express rakes were allotted to Coimbatore Chennai Central Weekly express.

Several stoppages has been removed for this train after COVID lockdown run but only Sivaganga stoppage alone provided again after restoration of regular service from COVID special service.

On June 16th 2024, this train has been provided with modern LHB coach rakes for efficient operation and additional passenger carrying capacity.

== Service and schedule ==
The train starts on Tuesdays from Coimbatore and on Wednesdays from Rameswaram, covering the total distance of 507.5 kilometres (315.3 mi) in approximately 12 hours.

== Route and stations ==
This train passes through 14 intermediate stations including Erode, Karur, Tiruchirappalli, Pudukkottai, Karaikkudi, Devakottai Road, Sivaganga and Manamadurai. Previously this train also had stoppages at Kallal, Chettinad and Kodumudi.

== Rake composition ==
This train shares its rake with Coimbatore Rajkot Express

- 1 AC II tier
- 3 AC III tier
- 14 sleeper coaches
- 2 general
- 2 second-class luggage/parcel van

Loco	1	2	3	4	5	6	7	8	9	10	11	12	13	14	15	16	17	18	19	20	21	22
	GRD	GEN	S1	S2	S3	S4	S5	S6	S7	S8	S9	S10	S11	S12	S13	S14	B1	B2	B3	A1	GEN	GRD
