= Chavadipalayam railway station =

Railway station in Tamil Nadu, India

Chavadipalayam

General information
- Location: Chavadipalayam Railway Station, Chavadipalayam, Erode, Tamil Nadu, India
- Coordinates: 11.2619°N 77.7909°E
- Elevation: 161 metres (528 ft)
- System: Indian Railways station
- Owner: Indian Railways
- Line: Erode–Tiruchirappalli line
- Platforms: 2
- Tracks: 2

Construction
- Structure type: On ground

Other information
- Station code: CVD
- Zone(s): Southern Railway zone
- Division(s): Salem
- Fare zone: Southern Railway zone

History
- Electrified: Single electric line
Location

Chavadipalayam railway station (station code: CVD) is an NSG–6 category Indian railway station in Salem railway division of Southern Railway zone. It is a station near Erode in Tamil Nadu, India. It is located along the Erode–Tiruchirappalli line between Erode Junction and Karur Junction.

== Goods terminal ==
A goods terminal has been developed by a private sector company in this station. It has a facility to serve goods traffic of half rake/full rake inward and outward goods from locals through booking.
