= Chennai Egmore–Mangaluru Central Express =

Train in India

Chennai Egmore – Mangaluru Central Express
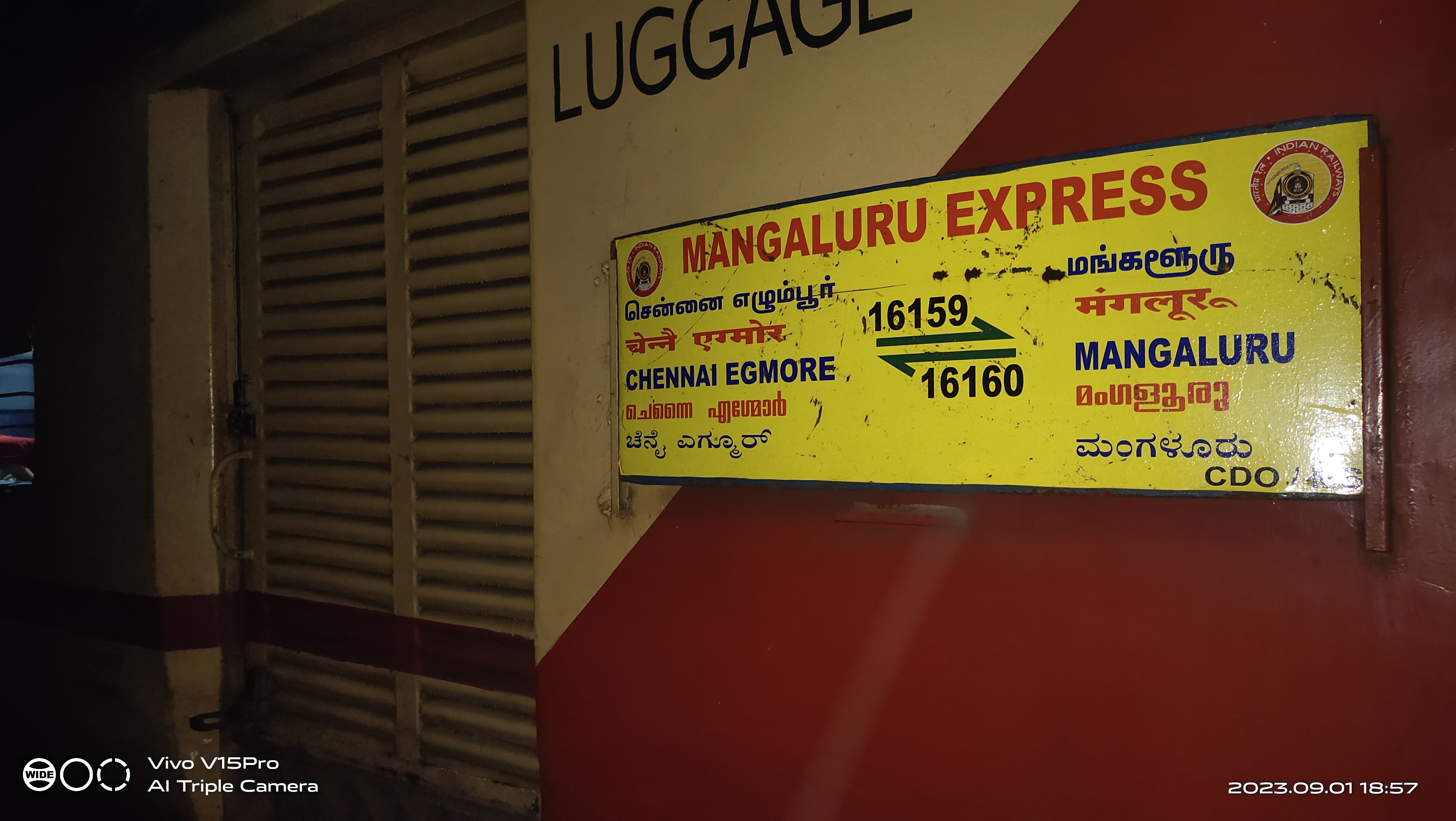
- Chennai Egmore - Mangaluru Central Express at Kodumudi

Overview
- Service type: Express
- Status: Active
- Locale: Tamil Nadu, Kerala, Puducherry & Karnataka
- First service: 1 July 2003; 23 years ago
- Current operator: Southern Railway zone
- Former operator: Indian Railways
- Ridership: Express
- Annual ridership: Express
- Website: www.indianrailways.gov.in

Route
- Termini: Chennai Egmore (MS); Mangalore Central (MAQ)
- Stops: 46
- Distance travelled: 986 km (613 mi)
- Average journey time: 19h 50m
- Service frequency: Daily
- Train number: 16159 / 16160
- Lines used: MS - TPJ ➡ Chord Line; TPJ - ED ➡ Main Line; ED - MAQ ➡ Coimbatore - Shornur ➡ Madgaon Line

On-board services
- Classes: SLRD - 2 Coaches; UR/GS - 2 Coaches; D (CC) - Non A/C Chair Car 3 Coaches; B - 2 Third A/C III Tire Coaches; SL - 11 Sleeper Coaches; A - 1 A/C Two Tier Coach
- Disabled access: Disabled access
- Seating arrangements: Open coach (Reserved); Corridor coach (Unreserved)
- Sleeping arrangements: Couchette car
- Auto-rack arrangements: No
- Catering facilities: E-Catering (Mangaluru to Tiruchchirappalli)
- Observation facilities: Large Windows
- Entertainment facilities: No
- Baggage facilities: Overhead racks Baggage carriage

Technical
- Rolling stock: MAQ - TPJ : WAP-4 Locomotive From ERODE or ARAKKONAM Electric Loco Shed's; TPJ - MS : WAP-4 Locomotive From ERODE or ARAKKONAM Electric Loco Shed's , WAP - 7 Locomotive from Erode or Royapuram Electric Loco Shed.
- Track gauge: 1,676 mm (5 ft 6 in)
- Electrification: 25 kV AC, 50 Hz (High Voltage Overhead Electric Traction)
- Operating speed: 52 kilometres per hour (32 mph)
- Average length: 20 Coaches (Utkrisht)
- Track owner: Southern Railway zone
- Timetable number: 21 / 21A / 86 / 86A
- Rake maintenance: Chennai Egmore
- Rake sharing: Dedicated Two Rakes
Route map
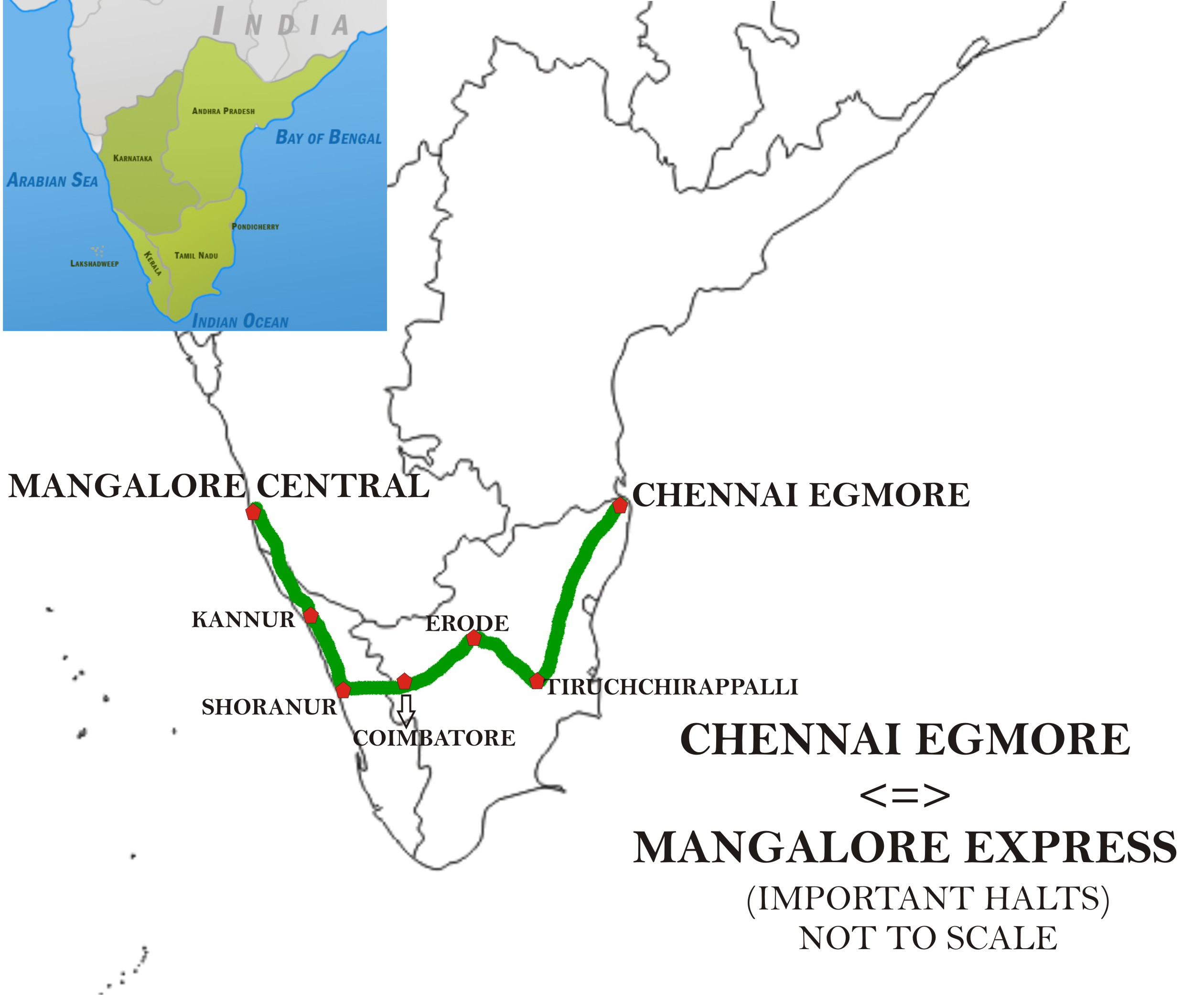

The 16159 / 16160 Chennai Egmore–Mangaluru Central Express is an express train belonging to the Southern Railway zone that runs between the city Chennai Egmore of Tamil Nadu and Mangaluru Central of Karnataka in India.

== Overview ==
This train was introduced during the 2003–2004 Railway Budget as a new daily train between Chennai Egmore and Erode via Tiruchirappalli Junction in Tamil Nadu, India. Later in the 2005–2006 Railway Budget, the train (No.6607 / 6608) was extended up to Coimbatore, citing large number of Melmaruvathur bound pilgrims, leaving the people of Karur in despair, who were largely benefitted of this train fearing decrease in reservation quotas. The train was again extended to Mangaluru in 2007, a move which forced the authorities to cancel the Tiruchirapalli–Mangaluru Express (No.6867 / 6868), with revised timings. The number of train was changed from the initial 6607 / 6608 to 6107 / 6108, and from 6107 / 6108 to 16107 / 16108 since December 2010 onwards as a part of train management system over the entire Indian Railways network. Again, the number of the train was changed to 16159 / 16160. From 9 September 2024, this train is short terminated at Tambaram and now running as Tambaram–Mangaluru Central-Tambaram Express. From 9 September 2024, this train was short-terminated at Tambaram and operated as the Tambaram–Mangaluru Central–Tambaram Express due to operational adjustments in the Salem division. Subsequently, effective from 18 September 2025, the train was re-extended to Chennai Egmore, restoring its original terminal. With this extension, it is now officially running as the Mangalore Express between Chennai Egmore and Mangaluru Central, bearing train numbers 16159/16160, thereby improving long-distance connectivity between Tamil Nadu and coastal Karnataka.

== Routes and halts ==
The Important Halts of the train are :

● Chennai Egmore

● Tambaram

● Chengalpattu Junction

● Villuppuram Junction

● Tiruchchirappalli Junction

● Karur Junction

● Erode Junction

● Coimbatore Junction

● Palakkad Junction

● Shoranur Junction

● Kozhikode

● Kannur

● Kasargod

● Mangaluru Central

== Rakes ==
The train has 20 Compressing Three AC 3-Tier (3A), Eleven Second Class Sleepers, Two Second Seating (2S), Two General compartments (Unreserved) and Two Luggage rakes. (Note: The coach composition is subject to change.)

Loco	1	2	3	4	5	6	7	8	9	10	11	12	13	14	15	16	17	18	19	20
	SLRD	UR	S11	S10	S9	S8	S7	S6	S5	S4	S3	S2	S1	B3	B2	B1	D2	D1	UR	SLRD

== Schedule ==
Some of the prominent stoppages include Chengalpattu Junction, Viluppuram Junction, Vriddhachalam Junction, Tiruchirappalli Junction, Karur Junction, Erode Junction, Coimbatore Junction, Palakkad Junction, Shoranur Junction. This daily express train departs Tambaram as Train No.16159, arrives at Tiruchirappalli Junction the next morning, reverses the loco and leaves for Mangalore Central and arrives the destination after dusk of same day. On the return journey, the train departs Mangalore Central as Train No.16160 just after dawn, arrives Tiruchirappalli Junction same night, reverses the loco and leaves for Tambaram, and arrives the destination next morning. (Note: The schedule and routes are subject to change for administrative reasons.)

• 16159 - 11:10 PM (Daily) [Chennai Egmore]

• 16160 - 6:45 AM (Daily) [Mangaluru Central]

== Accident ==
On 04 September 2015, 5 coaches including 3 AC coaches and an Unreserved coach along with SLR of 16859 Chennai Egmore - Mangalore Express (Then terminated at Chennai Egmore with Number 16859) derailed near Puvanur railway station, Villupuram - Vridhachalam section of Chord line. 39 passengers were reported injured.

== See also ==
- Mangalore Mail
- Mangala Lakshadweep Express
- Pearl City (Muthunagar) Superfast Express
- Nellai Superfast Express
- Kanniyakumari Superfast Express
- Pothigai Superfast Express
- Pandian Superfast Express
