= Kodumudi railway station =

Railway station in Tamil Nadu, India

Kodumudi

General information
- Location: Kodumudi Railway Station, Kodumudi, Erode district, Tamil Nadu, India
- Coordinates: 11.0764°N 77.8863°E
- Elevation: 134 metres (440 ft)
- System: Indian Railways station
- Owner: Indian Railways
- Line: Erode–Tiruchirappalli line
- Platforms: 2
- Tracks: 2

Construction
- Structure type: On ground

Other information
- Station code: KMD
- Zone(s): Southern Railway zone
- Division(s): Salem
- Fare zone: Southern Railway zone

History
- Electrified: Single electric line
Location

Kodumudi railway station (station code: KMD) is an NSG–6 category Indian railway station in Salem railway division of Southern Railway zone. It is a station at Kodumudi in Erode district, Tamil Nadu, India. It is located along the Erode–Tiruchirappalli line between Erode Junction and Karur Junction. The station is a stoppage for 18 halting trains and connects the religious pilgrimage center, Magudeswarar Temple, Kodumudi.
