= Totiyapalayam railway station =

Railway station in Tamil Nadu, India

Totiyapalayam

General information
- Location: Thotipalayam Railway Station, Muthampalayam, Tamil Nadu, India
- Coordinates: 11.2918°N 77.6812°E
- Elevation: 213 metres (699 ft)
- System: Indian Railways station
- Owner: Indian Railways
- Line: Jolarpettai–Shoranur line
- Platforms: 2
- Tracks: 2

Construction
- Structure type: On ground

Other information
- Status: Active
- Station code: TPM
- Zone(s): Southern Railway zone
- Division(s): Salem
- Fare zone: Southern Railway zone
Location
- Location within India Location within Tamil Nadu

Totiyapalayam railway station (station code: TPM) is an NSG–6 category Indian railway station in Salem railway division of Southern Railway zone. It is a station in Tamil Nadu, India, located between Erode Junction and Perundurai.
