= Rajkot–Coimbatore Express =

Train in India

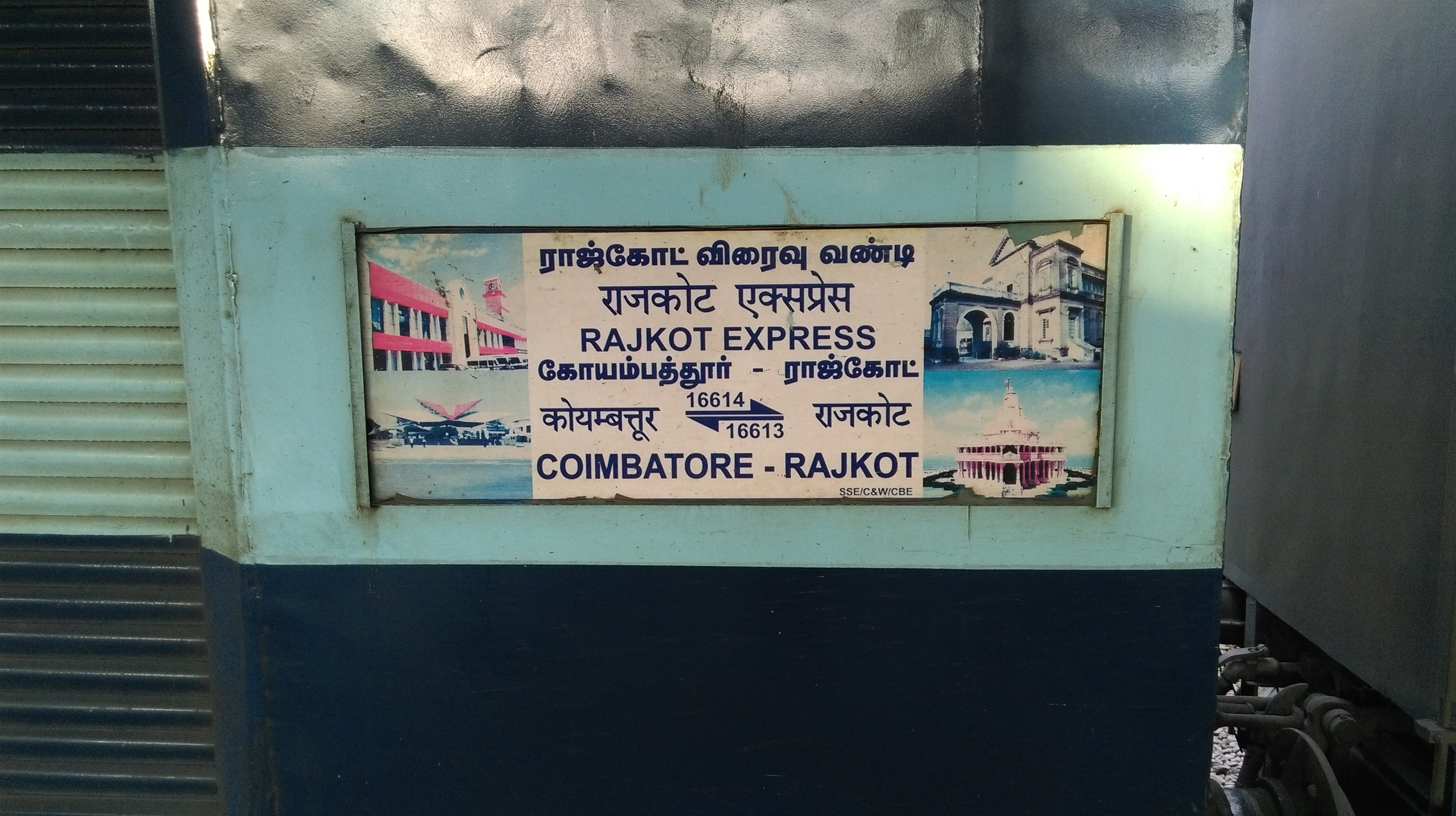

Overview
- Service type: Express
- First service: 15 August 1998; 27 years ago
- Current operator: Southern Railway

Route
- Termini: Rajkot Junction (RJT); Coimbatore Junction (CBE)
- Stops: 34
- Distance travelled: 2,217 km (1,378 mi)
- Average journey time: 40 hours 45 minutes
- Service frequency: Weekly
- Train number: 16613 / 16614

On-board services
- Classes: AC 2 tier, AC 3 tier, Sleeper class, General Unreserved
- Seating arrangements: Yes
- Sleeping arrangements: Yes
- Catering facilities: E-catering; On-board catering
- Observation facilities: Rake sharing with 16617/16618 Coimbatore–Rameswaram Express

Technical
- Rolling stock: ICF coach
- Track gauge: 1,676 mm (5 ft 6 in)
- Operating speed: 55 km/h (34 mph) average with halts
Route map
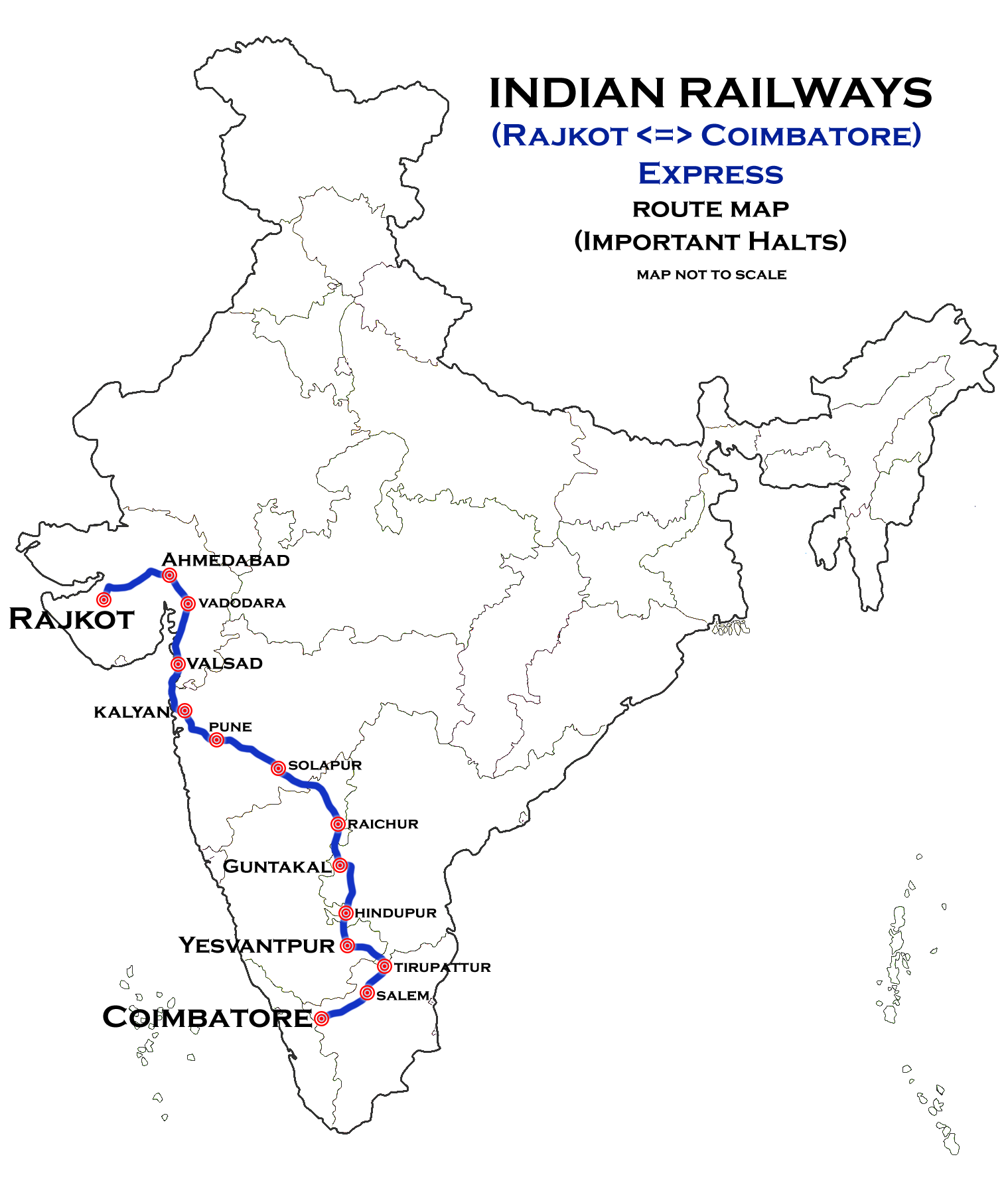

The 16613 / 16614 Rajkot–Coimbatore Express is an Express train run by Indian Railways between Coimbatore Junction in Tamil Nadu and Rajkot Junction in Gujarat. The train made its inaugural run on 15 August 1998.

== Coach composition ==
The train has standard ICF rakes with max speed of 110 kmph. The train consists of 22 coaches :

- 1 AC II Tier
- 7 AC III Tier
- 9 Sleeper coaches
- 3 General Unreserved
- 2 Seating cum Luggage Rake

== Service ==
The 16613/Rajkot–Coimbatore Express has an average speed of 55 km/h and covers 2217 km in 40 hrs 00 mins.

The 16614/Coimbatore–Rajkot Express has an average speed of 53 km/h and covers 2217 km in 41 hrs 35 mins.

== Route and halts ==
The 16613/14 Rajkot–Coimbatore Express runs from Rajkot Junction via Surendranagar Junction, Ahmedabad Junction, Vadodara Junction, Vasai Road, Kalyan Junction, Pune Junction, Kalaburagi Junction, Wadi Junction, Raichur Junction, Guntakal Junction, Gooty Junction, Dharmavaram Junction, Yelahanka Junction, Krishnarajapuram, Bangarapet Junction, Salem Junction, Erode Junction to Coimbatore Junction and vice versa.

== Gallery ==
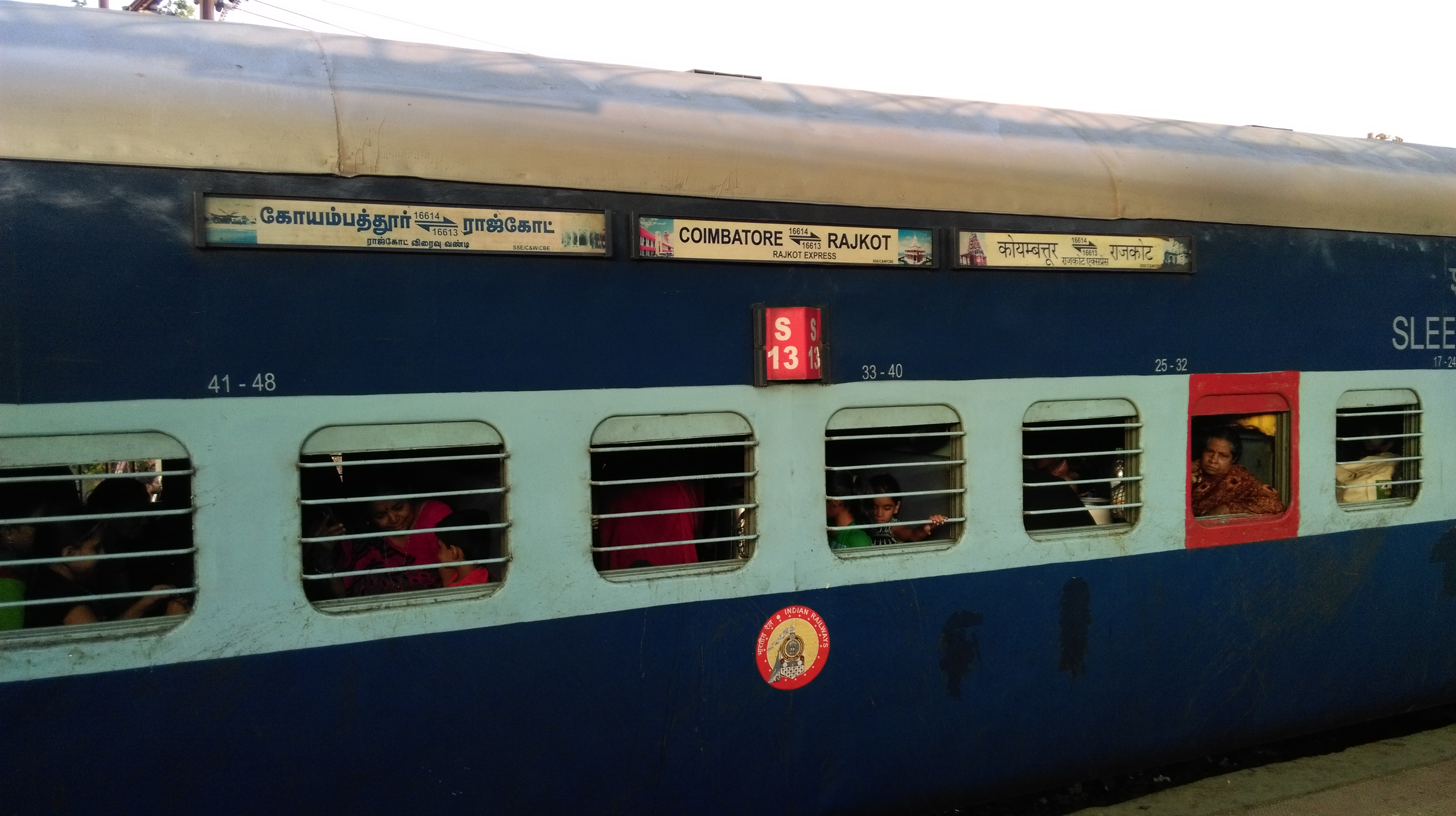
16613 Rajkot–Coimbatore Express – 13th Sleeper class coach

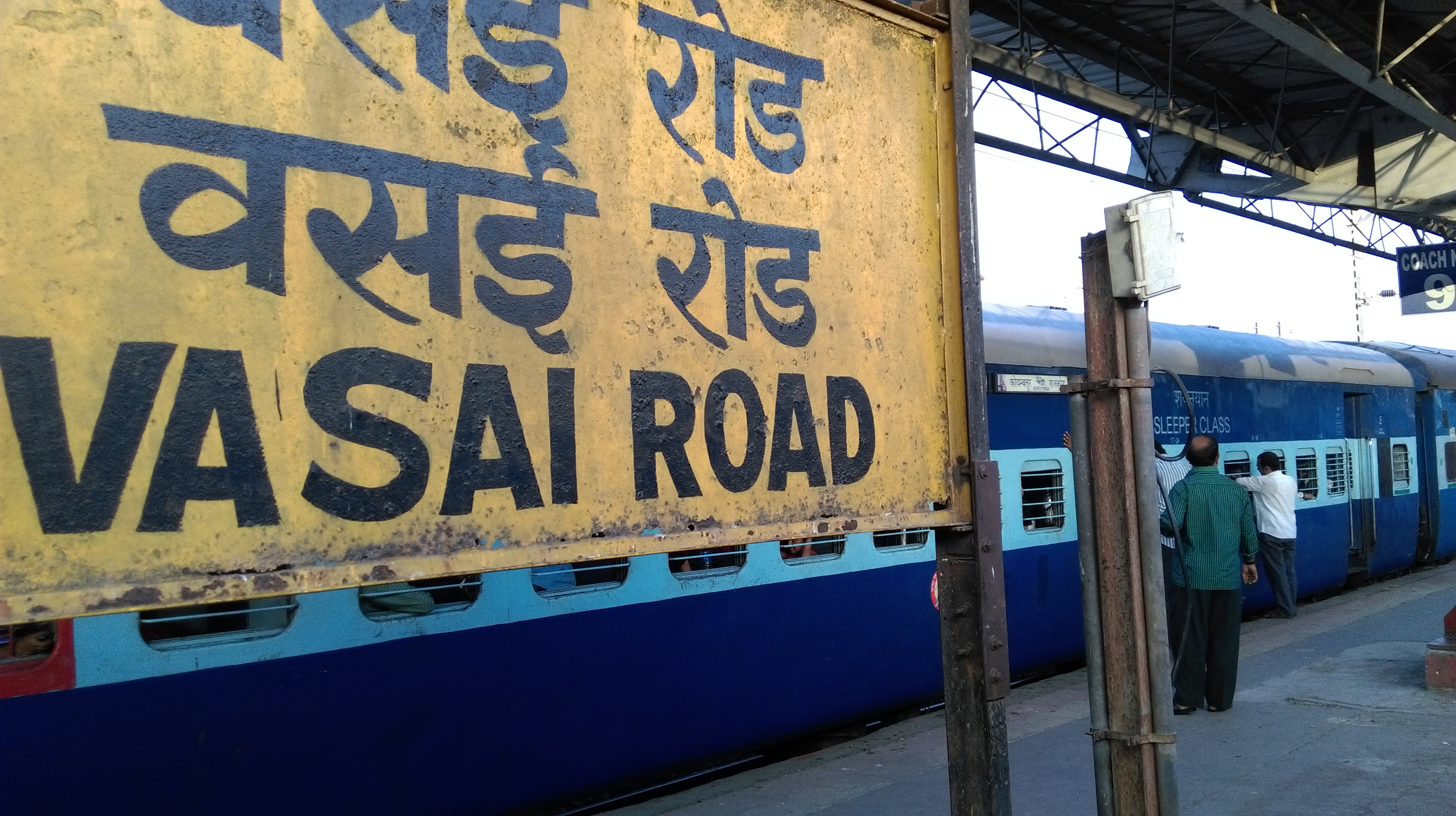
16613 Rajkot–Coimbatore Express – at Vasai Road

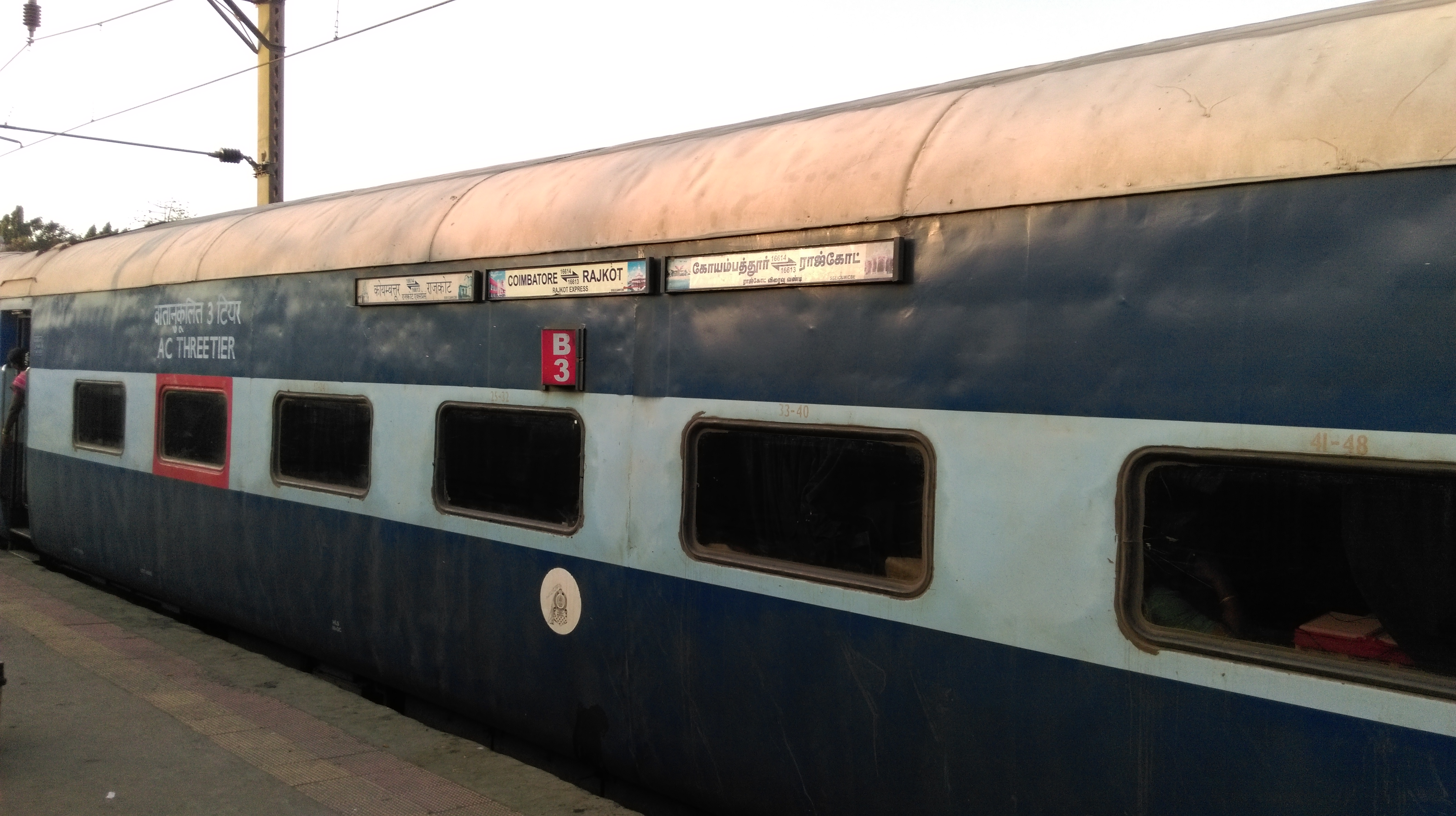
16613 Rajkot–Coimbatore Express – AC 3 tier coach

== Schedule ==
Train number	Station code	Departure station	Departure time	Departure day	Arrival station	Arrival time	Arrival day
16613	RJT	Rajkot Junction	05:30 AM	Sun	Coimbatore Junction	21:30 PM	Mon
16614	CBE	Coimbatore Junction	00:15 AM	Fri	Rajkot Junction	17:50 PM	Sat

== Traction ==
Both trains are hauled by an Electric Loco Shed, Erode-based WAP-4 locomotive from end to end.

== Rake sharing ==
The train shares its rake with 16617/16618 Coimbatore–Rameswaram Express.
