= Chennai Central–Coimbatore Shatabdi Express =

Shatabdi Express train in India

MGR Chennai Central – Coimbatore Junction Shatabdi Express
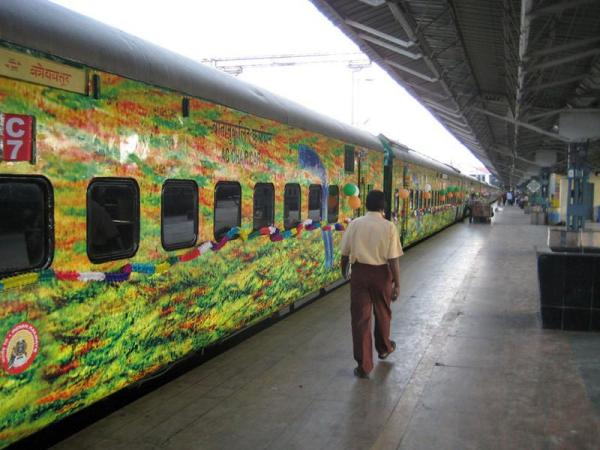

Overview
- Service type: Shatabdi Express
- Locale: Tamil Nadu
- First service: 27 January 2011; 15 years ago as Duronto Express, 22 November 2013; 12 years ago as Shatabdi Express
- Current operator: Southern Railways

Route
- Termini: Chennai Central (MAS); Coimbatore Junction (CBE)
- Stops: 5
- Distance travelled: 492.85 km (Chargeable distance 502 km)
- Average journey time: 6h 40m
- Service frequency: 6 days a week (Note: Except Tuesdays)
- Train number: 12243/12244

On-board services
- Classes: Executive class, AC chair car
- Seating arrangements: Yes
- Sleeping arrangements: No
- Catering facilities: Yes
- Observation facilities: Large windows
- Baggage facilities: Overhead racks

Technical
- Rolling stock: LHB coach
- Track gauge: Broad – 1,676 mm (5 ft 6 in)
- Operating speed: 77 km/h (average)
Route map
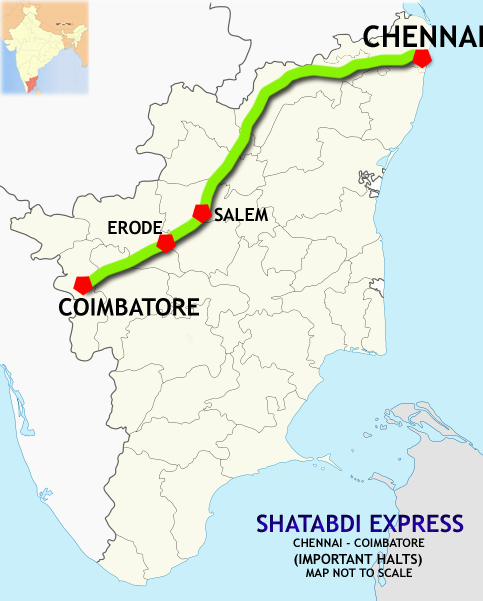

The Chennai Central–Coimbatore Shatabdi Express is a Shatabdi Express train between Chennai Central and Coimbatore Junction in Tamil Nadu.

== History ==
The Shatabdi Express which was running from 1995 and 2000 was stopped because it had occupancy of 60 percent as cited by Railways, It was replaced with an Intercity Express departing at identical timings. Later, Indian railways introduced a Duronto Express between Chennai and Coimbatore in 2011. It was converted to Shatabdi Express on 22 Nov 2013 with commercial stoppages to increase revenues as Duronto Express should have had no commercial halt then though it could have operational/ technical halt(s) if it was needed for railways.

== Rake composition & coaches ==
The 12243/44 MGR Chennai Central–Coimbatore Junction Shatabdi Express presently has 1 Executive class, 9 AC chair car and 2 end-on generator coaches. The train runs with modern LHB coaches and so equipped with Anubhuti coach.

The coaches in Light blue colour indicate AC Chair Cars and the coaches in Violet colour indicate Executive Chair Car.

1	2	3	4	5	6	7	8	9	10	11	12	13
	EOG	E1	C1	C2	C3	C4	C5	C6	C7	C8	C9	EOG

== Route and stations ==
The train has 5 commercial stops in between the starting station and the ending station namely, Katpadi Junction, Jolarpettai Junction, Salem Junction, Erode Junction and Tiruppur.

By comparing with distance written on Chennai Division Map on Southern Railway website and distance written in timetable of a train having stoppages at AVADI and HINDU COLLEGE(H) on official website (If there is no reserved train having stoppages at both places, please view where schedule of unreserved trains is available on official website to verify because you don't find anything if you view the place on official website where only reserved train schedule is available.), the chargeable distance is increased by 6-7 km between AVADI and HINDU COLLEGE(H) and by comparing with distance written on Chennai Division Map and Salem Division Map both on Southern Railway website taking together, and on the other hand, distance written in timetable of a train on official website having stoppages at JOLARPETTAI and TIRUPATTUR JN (If there is no reserved train having stoppages at both places, please view where schedule of unreserved trains is available on official website to verify because you don't find anything if you view the place on official website where only reserved train schedule is available.), the chargeable distance is increased by about 4 km between JOLARPETTAI and TIRUPATTUR JN. Maybe the reason behind increasing is higher cost for special railway infrastructure of these regions (not sure). As per just mentioned Chennai Division Map and Salem Division Map both on Southern Railway website taking together, distance between MGR Chennai Central and IRUGUR(H) is 475.15 km and IRUGUR(H) to COIMBATORE JN is 17.70 km and taking their sum is 492.85 km which is real distance between MGR Chennai Central and Coimbatore but chargeable distance is 502 km. It is readers responsibility to check if following links are official or not: (search maps on it)

== Traction ==
This train is hauled either by Royapuram WAP-7 or by Erode WAP-7.

== See also ==
- Cheran Superfast Express
- Kovai Express
- Nilgiri Express
- Southern Railway zone
- Indian Railways
