= Perundurai railway station =

Railway station near Perundurai in Erode District of Tamil Nadu

Perundurai

General information
- Location: Perundurai, Erode district, Tamil Nadu; India
- Coordinates: 11.2538°N 77.6289°E
- System: Light rail and Commuter rail station
- Owner: Indian Railways
- Line: Jolarpettai–Shoranur line
- Platforms: 2
- Tracks: 4

Construction
- Structure type: Standard on-ground station
- Parking: Available
- Cycle facilities: Not Available

Other information
- Status: Active
- Station code: PY
- Fare zone: Southern Railway zone

History
- Former names: Madras and Southern Mahratta Railway
Route map
- Source: Google Maps
Location
- Location within India Location within Tamil Nadu

Perundurai railway station (station code: PY) is an NSG–6 category Indian railway station in Salem railway division of Southern Railway zone. It is a railway station near Perundurai in Erode of Tamil Nadu.

== Location ==
It falls between Erode Junction railway station and Coimbatore Junction railway station in the Jolarpettai–Shoranur line under Salem railway division. It is located 13 kilometres (8.1 mi) from Erode Junction. All the eight passenger trains running between Erode Junction and Coimbatore Junction will have a stop at here.

== Future developments ==
The station is expected to be developed under Corporate Social Responsibility scheme with the help from Commercial establishments and Educational Institutions of this region.

There are proposals that dates back to pre-Independence for laying a new line through Perundurai connecting Palani and Chamarajanagar via Dharapuram, Kangeyam, Chennimalai, Erode Junction, Gobichettipalayam and Sathyamangalam. Several changes have been made to theses proposal in due time. And a new survey done for Erode–Palani line in 2007 and the proposed new line from Erode Junction will run parallel to the existing Jolarpettai–Shoranur line and it will branch-off towards Palani after Perundurai. As an alternate for Erode-Chamarajanagar railway line, which faces many obstacles from Environmental clearance due to Sathyamangalam Wildlife Sanctuary, changes made and survey completed for Erode-Sathyamangalam section alone in 2007.

- Also, the Perundurai SIPCOT industrial association is requesting to construct a new spur line connecting Perundurai railway station with the SIPCOT Industrial Complex for easy transport of goods commodities.
- As a part of the Comprehensive Mobility Plan developed for Erode Local Planning Area, the Erode district administration has proposed to shift the Goods terminal at Erode Junction to the city outskirts near Perundurai railway station.
