= Cheran Superfast Express =

Train in India

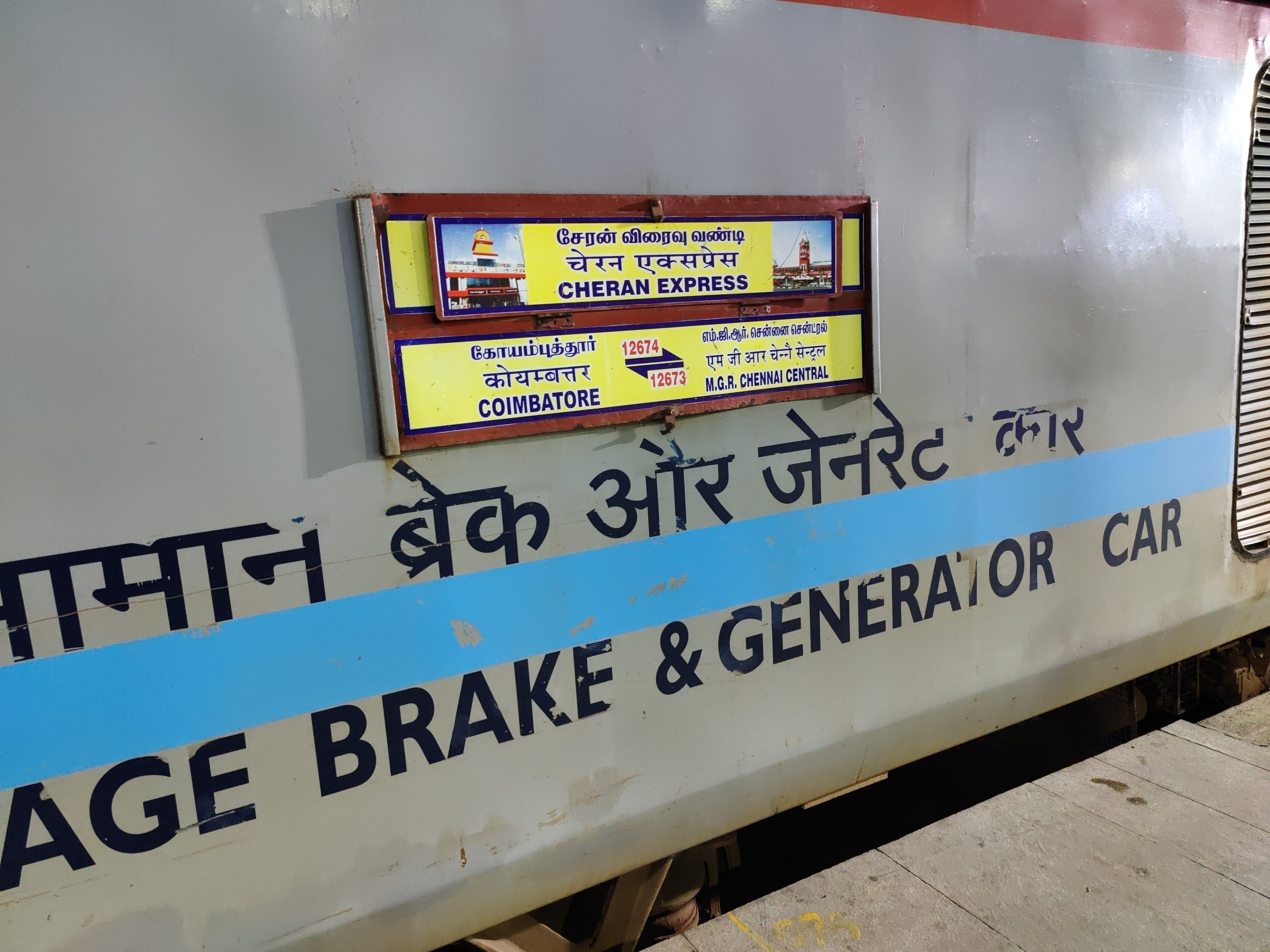
- Cheran Express board

Overview
- Service type: Super Fast Express
- Locale: Tamil Nadu
- Current operator: Southern Railways

Route
- Termini: Chennai Central; Coimbatore Junction
- Stops: 7
- Distance travelled: 496 km (308 mi)
- Average journey time: 8 hours 15 minutes
- Service frequency: Daily
- Train number: 12673 / 12674

On-board services
- Classes: AC First, AC Two Tier, AC Three Tier, Sleeper, General Unreserved
- Seating arrangements: Yes
- Sleeping arrangements: Yes
- Catering facilities: Yes

Technical
- Track gauge: 1,676 mm (5 ft 6 in)
- Operating speed: 60 km/h (37 mph) average with halts
Route map
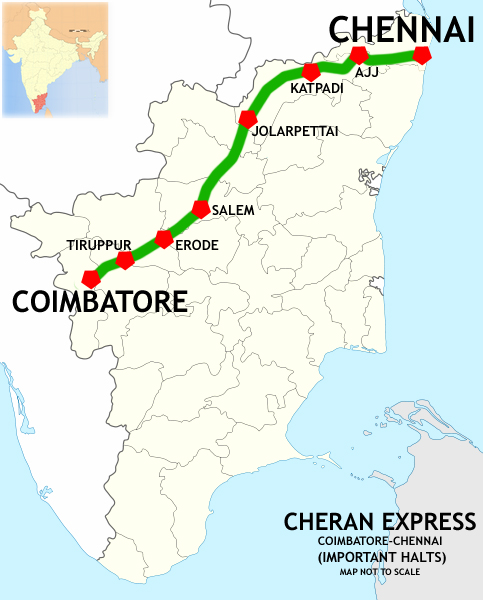

The Cheran Superfast Express is an overnight Super Fast Express train in India which runs daily between Coimbatore Junction and Chennai Central via Salem Jn on the Southern Railway zone of the Indian Railways.

== History ==
It was inaugurated on Jul 05, 1984 as a day train between Coimbatore Junction and Madras Central, with Air-Conditioned Chair Car and Second Class Sitting coaches to run opposite Kovai Express was changed to run night time with Sleeper Coaches. At present, Coimbatore–Chennai Central Intercity is running in the old schedule of Cheran express

== Numbering ==
Train Number 12673 runs from Chennai Central to Coimbatore Junction while 12674 runs from Coimbatore Junction to Chennai Central. The Cheran Express began to run with LHB coaches from 10 November 2017.

== Coach position ==
With the introduction of LHB coaches to Cheran Superfast Express, it has the following coach position:

- 1 AC First Class
- 1 AC Two Tier
- 6 AC Three Tier
- 9 Sleeper Class
- 3 General Unreserved
- 1 End On Generator
- 1 Luggage Cum LHB Brake Vans

This train shares its rake with Thiruvananthapuram Mail

== Loco links ==
The train is hauled by WAP 7 locomotive on its entire route.

== Route ==
- The train starts from Coimbatore at 22.50 hours and reaches Chennai at 07.00 hours the next day.
- In the return direction it leaves Chennai at 22.00 hours and reaches Coimbatore at 06.00 hours. The train stops at Tiruppur, Erode Junction, Salem Junction, Jolarpettai Junction and Arakkonam Junction . In the return direction (from Chennai), it also stops at the Coimbatore North Junction.

== Incidents ==
In 2005, an unidentified person was killed in a fire inside a toilet on the train.

In 2007, five coaches of the train derailed near Ambur due to a lower bearing failure resulting in ten passengers getting injured.

== See also ==
- Tamil Nadu Express
- Chennai Rajdhani
- Nellai Express
- Coimbatore Shatabdi Express
- Pallavan Express
- Vaigai express
- Rockfort Express
- Kovai Express
- Pandian Express
- Pearl City Express
- Uzhavan Express
