= Kongu Express =

Train in India

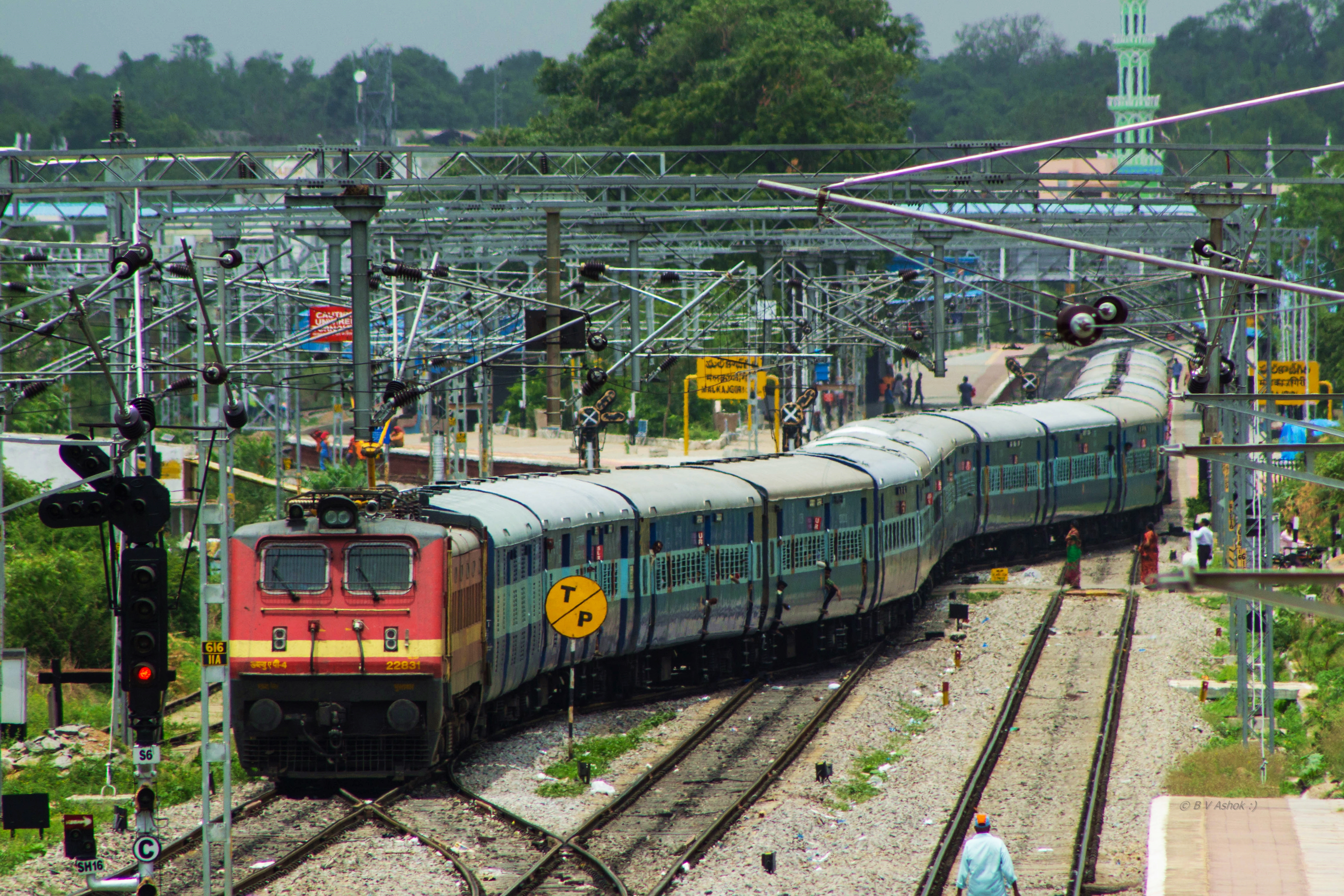
- Kongu Express switching tracks at Malkajgiri to join Kazipet line

Overview
- Service type: Superfast
- First service: 3 April 2000; 26 years ago
- Current operator: Southern Railways

Route
- Termini: Coimbatore Junction (CBE); Hazrat Nizamuddin (NZM)
- Stops: 23
- Distance travelled: 2,676 km (1,663 mi)
- Average journey time: 47 hours 10 minutes
- Service frequency: Weekly
- Train number: 12647 / 12648

On-board services
- Classes: AC 3 Tier, AC 2 Tier, Sleeper class, General Unreserved
- Seating arrangements: Yes
- Sleeping arrangements: Yes
- Catering facilities: On-board catering E-catering
- Observation facilities: Large windows
- Baggage facilities: Available

Technical
- Rolling stock: LHB coach
- Track gauge: 1,676 mm (5 ft 6 in)
- Operating speed: 56 km/h (35 mph) average with halts
Route map
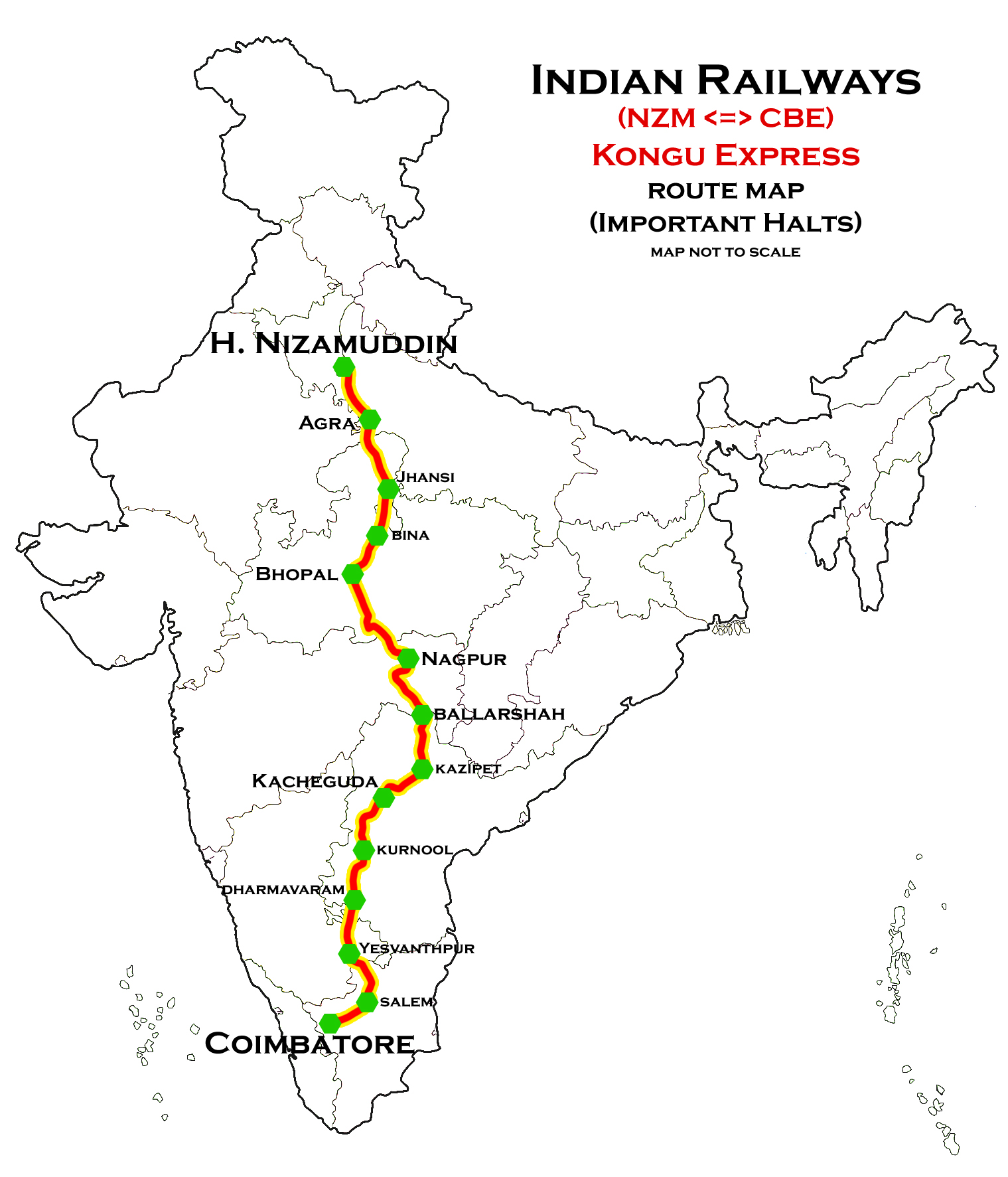

The 12647 / 12648 Kongu Express is a Superfast weekly train run by Indian Railways between Coimbatore Junction and Hazrat Nizamuddin. The train was named after the Kongu region of Tamil Nadu, called Kongu Nadu. The train made its inaugural run on 3 April 2000.

== Service ==
The train starts on Wednesdays from Nizamuddin, and on Sundays from Coimbatore, covering the total distance of 2,716 kilometres (1,688 mi) in approximately 47 hours. before COVID Curfew, this train was operated via Dharmapuri, Hosur but rerouted via Bangarapet after lockdown.

== Time table ==
| Station code | Station name | Arrival | Departure |
|---|---|---|---|
| CBE | Coimbatore Junction | --- | 16:30 |
| TUP | Tiruppur | 17:08 | 17:10 |
| ED | Erode Junction | 17:50 | 17:55 |
| SA | Salem Junction | 18:45 | 18:50 |
| KJM | Krishnarajapuram | 22:38 | 22:40 |
| YNK | Yelahanka Junction | 23:25 | 23:30 |
| HUP | Hindupur | 00:39 | 00:40 |
| DMM | Dharmavaram Junction | 02:25 | 02:30 |
| ATP | Anantapur | 03:08 | 03:10 |
| DHNE | Dhone Junction | 05:15 | 05:20 |
| KRNT | Kurnool City | 06:13 | 06:15 |
| MBNR | Mahbubnagar | 08:38 | 08:40 |
| KCG | Kacheguda | 10:30 | 10:40 |
| KZJ | Kazipet Junction | 13:08 | 13:10 |
| BPQ | Balharshah Junction | 17:10 | 17:15 |
| NGP | Nagpur Junction | 20:55 | 21:00 |
| BZU | Betul | 23:28 | 23:30 |
| ET | Itarsi Junction | 01:50 | 02:00 |
| BPL | Bhopal Junction | 03:30 | 03:35 |
| BINA | Bina Junction | 05:30 | 05:35 |
| JHS | Virangana Lakshmibai Jhansi Junction | 07:15 | 07:20 |
| GWL | Gwalior Junction | 08:55 | 08:57 |
| AGC | Agra Cantt | 10:50 | 10:55 |
| MTJ | Mathura Junction | 11:55 | 12:00 |
| NZM | Hazrat Nizamuddin | 14:15 | --- |

== Coach ==
The Kongu Express has rake sharing arrangement with the train no. 12681/82 Coimbatore–Chennai Central Superfast Express. Despite its long-distance run of 47 hours, the train continues to operate without a pantry car and food gets loaded onto the train at en-route stations.

== Traction ==
Both trains are hauled by Erode or Royapuram WAP-7 electric locomotive from Coimbatore Junction to Hazrat Nizamuddin. and vice versa. The train has no rack reversal or loco change

== See also ==
- Kongu Nadu
- Coimbatore
- Coimbatore Junction

== Coach composition ==
The train has standard LHB rakes with max speed of 130 kmph.

- 2 AC II Tier
- 6 AC III Tier
- 6 Sleeper coaches
- 4 General
- 2 End-on Generators

| Loco | 1 | 2 | 3 | 4 | 5 | 6 | 7 | 8 | 9 | 10 | 11 | 12 | 13 | 14 | 15 | 16 | 17 | 18 | 19 | 20 |
|---|---|---|---|---|---|---|---|---|---|---|---|---|---|---|---|---|---|---|---|---|
| | EOG | GEN | GEN | S1 | S2 | S3 | S4 | S5 | S6 | B1 | B2 | B3 | B4 | B5 | B6 | A1 | A2 | GEN | GEN | EOG |
