= Erode–Palani line =

Proposed railway lines in India

Erode–Dharapuram-Palani line
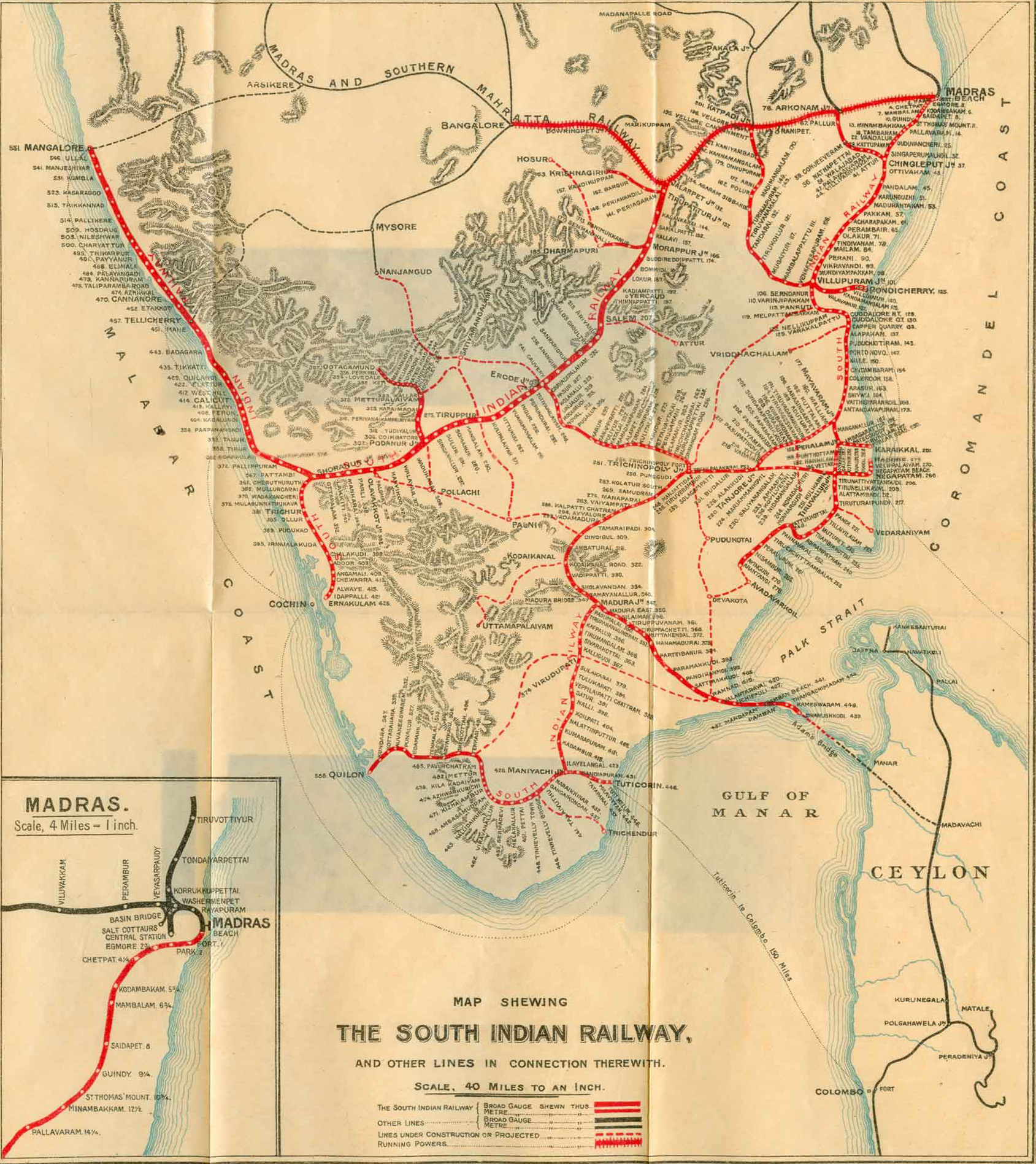
- South Indian Railway Pink Book, 1909. Masterplan created by S.I.R.

Overview
- Status: Proposed
- Owner: Indian Railways
- Locale: Tamilnadu
- Termini: Erode Kangeyam Dharapuram; Palani

Service
- Operator: Southern Railway zone

Technical
- Track length: 91.5 km (57 mi)
- Number of tracks: 1
- Track gauge: 5 ft 6 in (1,676 mm) broad gauge
- Operating speed: up to 80 km/h (50 mph)

The Erode–Kangeyam-Dharapuram-Palani line is a proposed railway line from Erode Junction (via) Kangeyam, Dharapuram to Palani in the state of Tamil Nadu. It is a part of Southern Railway zone of Indian Railways. This line upon construction will improve rail connectivity of the Pilgrimage center with Chennai and other states of the country. It was a revised version of the original pre-independence proposal by the British.

== History ==
The revived proposal was initially prepared way back in 1915 to link Palani and Nanjangud via Erode and Chamrajanagar. The route was planned via Dharapuram, Kangeyam, Erode, Gobichettipalayam, Sathyamangalam and Chamrajanagar. The British had conducted surveys in 1922, 1936 and 1942 and survey stones were also laid for the proposed railway line. But after that the Erode-Chamarajanagar project pre-independence proposal did not take off. In 2005 it was split into two different projects. One being the Erode–Palani line and the other Erode-Chamarajanagar line. The later one connecting Erode with Chamarajanagar has been split up into two sectors namely Erode-Sathyamangalam and the Sathyamangalam-Chamarajanagar section which is covered in the South Western Railway Zone's recent proposal of Bangalore-Chamarajanagar-Sathyamangalam line.

The recent Survey has been completed for the proposed Erode-Palani Rail link in the financial year 2006-2007 and estimated a sum of Rupees 289 crores.

== Route ==
The proposed 91.5 km line goes through Erode Junction-Chennimalai-Kangeyam-Uthiyur-Dharapuram-Palani in the districts of Erode, Tiruppur and Dindigul.

== Timeline ==
- The original revived proposal taken up in the year 1915
- British Rule surveys done in 1922, 1936 and 1942
- In 1996 new proposal by South Western Railway connecting Bengaluru-Kollegal-Chamarajanagar-Sathyamangalam and so the Erode-Satyamangalam line proposal dealt separately.
- Modified proposal for Erode–Palani line announced in 2005-2006 financial year
- In 2007, fresh survey has been conducted for the proposed line and estimated to have 9 stations, 157 Bridges and 477hectare land acquisition. The project cost was estimated to be Rupees 600 crore with a sum of Rupees 289 crores towards the preliminary works including land acquisition.
- In 2008 foundation stone laid for the project and the preliminary works commenced.
- In 2008-2009 financial year Rupees 40 crores sanctioned as an initial amount towards preliminary works land acquisition and fund got released in 2010.
- In 2009-2010 financial year another sum of Rupees 33 crores has been sanctioned which got released in 2011.
- In 2012 a sum of Rupees 12 crore has been allotted for this project all in a total of Rupees 87 crore.
- After 2012, in every annual budget, the project is being allotted a minimal amount by Central Government to keep it active on the shelves mentioning the reason that the State Government contribution of 50 percent share has not been approved yet.
- As per 2020 reports, the project cost is estimated to be Rupees 1140 crores.
- In 2021, Union minister L. Murugan asked railway minister to start this project.
- In 2023-25 Budget, a sum of rupees 50 crores has been allotted for this project.
