= Kodumudi =

- Taluk headquarters
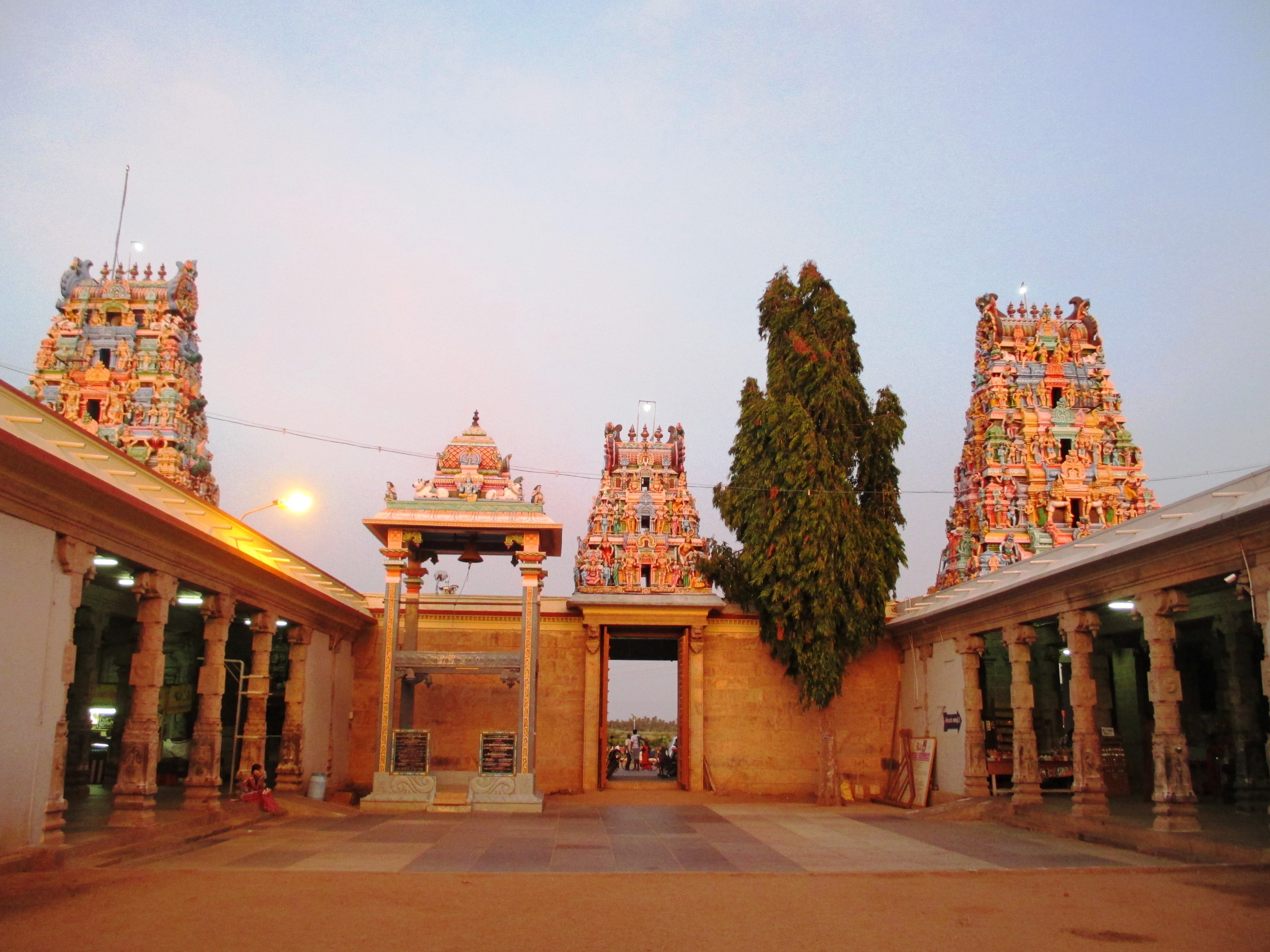

- Kodumudi, Tamil Nadu
- Coordinates: 11.078800°N 77.886700°E
- Country: India
- State: Tamil Nadu
- District: Erode
- Elevation: 155 m (509 ft)

Population (2001)
  - Total: 12,669

Languages
  - Official: Tamil
- Time zone: UTC+5:30 (IST)
- PIN: 638151
- Telephone code: 04204
- Vehicle registration: TN 33

Kodumudi is a panchayat town and taluk headquarters of Kodumudi taluk in Erode district at state of Tamil Nadu, India. Kodumudi has an average elevation of 144 metres (472 feet). The Kaveri River and Magudeswarar Temple in Kodumudi attract thousands of pilgrims.

== Demographics ==
As of the 2001 India census, Kodumudi had a population of 12,669. Males constituted 50% of the population, and females 50%. Kodumudi has an average literacy rate of 70%, higher than the national average of 59.5%; male literacy is 77%, and female literacy is 62%. In Kodumudi, 8% of the population is under 6 years of age.

== Notable people ==
- K. B. Sundarambal, singer and actress
