= Kovai Express =

Train in India

Kovai Superfast Express
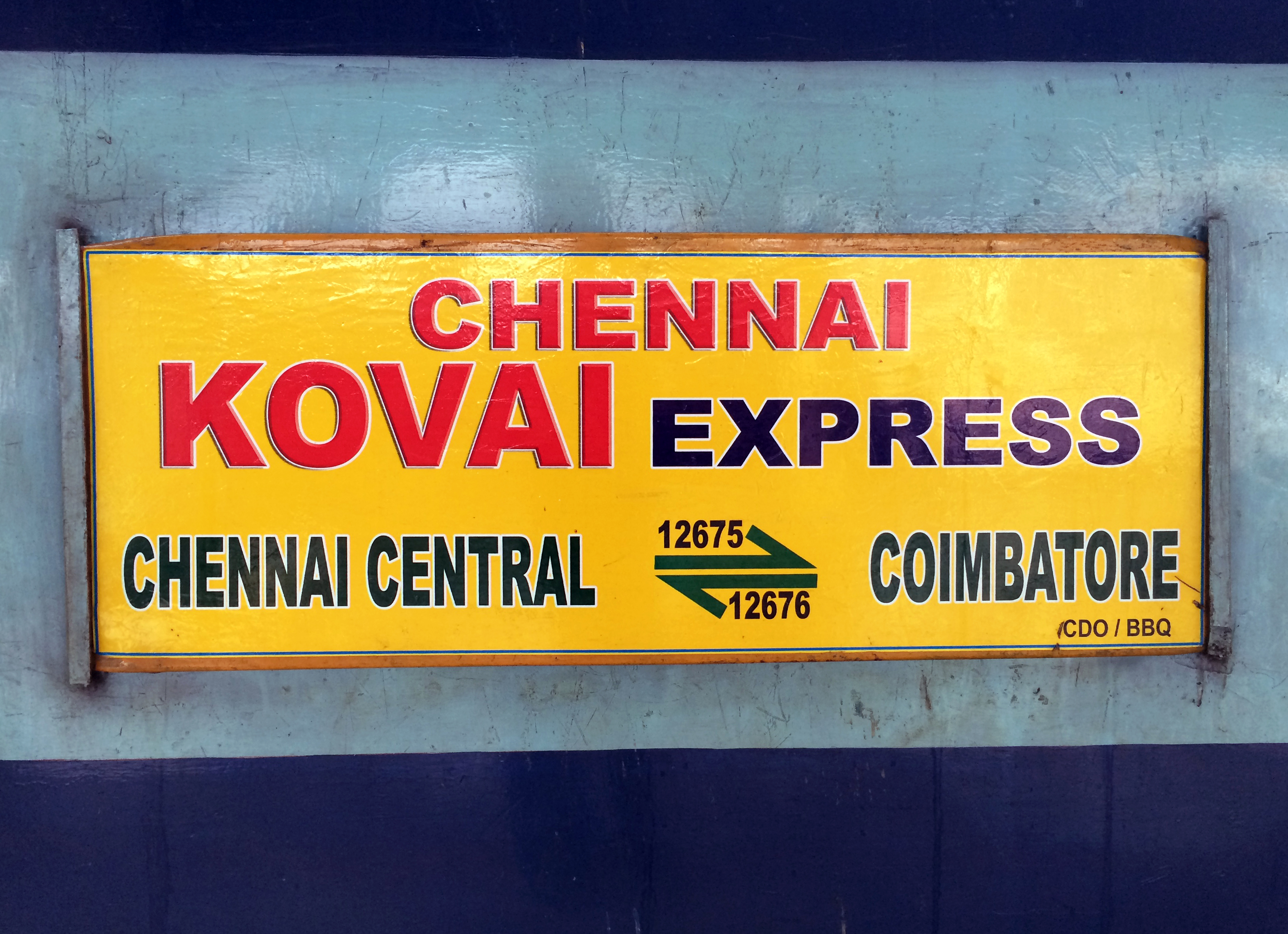

Overview
- Service type: Super Fast Express
- Locale: Tamil Nadu
- First service: 14 April 1977; 49 years ago
- Current operator: Southern Railway zone

Route
- Termini: Puratchi Thalaivar Dr. M.G. Ramachandran Central Railway Station (MAS); Coimbatore Junction (CBE)
- Stops: 10
- Distance travelled: 502 km (312 mi)
- Average journey time: 7 hours 55 minutes
- Service frequency: Daily
- Train number: 12675 / 12676

On-board services
- Classes: AC Chair Car, Second Class Sitting, General Unreserved
- Seating arrangements: Yes
- Sleeping arrangements: No
- Catering facilities: Available
- Observation facilities: Large windows

Technical
- Rolling stock: LHB coach
- Track gauge: 1,676 mm (5 ft 6 in)
- Operating speed: 66 km/h (41 mph) average with halts
Route map
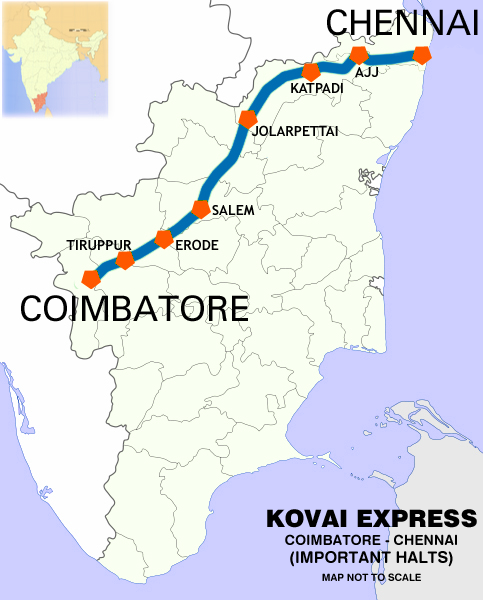

The 12675 / 12676 Kovai Superfast Express is a daily superfast express train on Indian Railways, running between Puratchi Thalaivar Dr. M.G. Ramachandran Central Railway Station and Coimbatore Junction. The train made its inaugural run on 14 April 1977 and was one of the fastest Express trains in India, with an average speed of 65 km/h including stops . It is also one of the most prestigious trains of Southern Railway.

== Name ==
The train is named after Coimbatore, which is also known as Kovai.

== Service ==
This train is an all day, day time superfast and has a Chair Car (Coach) seating arrangement with air-conditioned and non-air conditioned coaches and Pantry car. The 12675/12676 Puratchi Thalaivar Dr. M.G. Ramachandran Chennai Central Railway Station - Coimbatore Junction Intercity Superfast Express is its opposite route partner.

== Route and stations ==
Kovai Express, or popularly referred to as Kovai, connects Tamil Nadu's state capital Chennai and its second largest city Coimbatore, a major textile, educational and engineering center. This train covers 6 corporation cities out of 12 in the state: Chennai, Vellore, Salem, Erode, Tiruppur and Coimbatore. The route covers most of the major industrial hubs in the north west part of Tamil Nadu. En route, starting from Coimbatore, it covers important towns of Tirupur, an international hosiery goods exporting town, Erode, a principle agricultural and major Industrial town, Salem which is a major steel and mineral town, Morappur, a station that serves passengers from Dharmapuri and surrounding areas, major leather goods exporting centers Ambur, Vaniyambadi, Arakkonam Junction The National Disaster Response Force (NDRF), INS Rajali Naval Air Station and Vellore-Katpadi which has both a medical center a university.

== Rake ==
Kovai Express contains a total number of 22 LHB coach. Previously it has a single dedicated rake unit but now its rakes are being shared with Brindhavan Express. Its rakes are maintained at GSN yard, Bainbridge, Chennai. The current composition is as follows:

22 standard LHB coaches and hauled end to end by an electric locomotive WAP-7 (earlier was diesel like WDM-3A or WDP-4D)

EOG	UR	UR	C1	C2	D1	D2	D3	PC	D4	D5	D6	D7	D8	D9	D10	D11	D12	D13	UR	UR	EOG

== Historic information ==
The old number was 75/76, later changed in the 1980s to 2675/2676, as per new four-digit format numbering system later adopted by the Indian Railways. From December 2011 onwards 5-digit train number system was introduced all over India and accordingly Kovai express train number was again changed as 12675/12676. In 1978 it was pulled by a Diesel Engine with Kovai Express boldly written on it. It used to start from Chennai at 6 A.M and its next stop was Katpadi arriving at 7.43 A.M. Other stops at that time was Jolarpet, Salem, Erode, Tiruppur and Coimbatore. It used to reach Cbe at 2 p.m. and start back at 2.20 p.m. Now Shatabdi Express has taken over the Kovai express timings.

== Time table ==
MAS 》CBE 12675

Station code	Station name	Arrival	Departure
MAS	Chennai Central	SRC	06:10
AJJ	Arakkonam Jn	07:03	07:05
WJR	Walajah Road Jn	07:33	07:35
KPD	Katpadi Jn	07:58	08:00
AB	Ambur	08:40	08:42
JTJ	Jolarpettai	09:13	09:15
MAP	Morappur	09:59	10:00
SA	Salem Jn	11:02	11:05
ED	Erode Jn	12:00	12:05
TUP	Tiruppur	12:48	12:50
CBE	Coimbatore Jn	14:05	DSTN

CBE 》MAS 12676

Station code	Station name	Arrival	Departure
CBE	Coimbatore Jn	SRC	15:15
TUP	Tiruppur	15:58	16:00
ED	Erode Jn	16:40	16:45
SA	Salem Jn	17:37	17:40
MAP	Morappur	18:29	18:30
JTJ	Jolarpettai	19:23	19:25
AB	Ambur	19:50	19:52
KPD	Katpadi Jn	20:30	20:32
WJR	Walajah Road Jn	20:50	20:52
AJJ	Arakkonam	21:23	21:25
PER	Perambur	22:08	22:10
MAS	Chennai Central	22:45	DSTN

== See also ==
- Famous trains
- The Grand Trunk Express
- Pallavan Express
- Nellai Express
- Rockfort Express
- Pandian Express
- Pearl City Express
- Tamil Nadu Express
- Cheran Express
