= Coimbatore–Chennai Central Superfast Express =

Train in India

Overview
- Service type: Express
- Locale: Tamil Nadu
- Current operator: Southern Railways

Route
- Termini: Coimbatore city Junction; Chennai Central
- Stops: 5
- Distance travelled: 496 km (308 mi)
- Average journey time: 8 hours 10 minutes
- Service frequency: Weekly
- Train number: 12681/12682

On-board services
- Classes: Sleeper, A/C sleeper
- Seating arrangements: Yes
- Sleeping arrangements: Yes
- Catering facilities: No

Technical
- Track gauge: 1,676 mm (5 ft 6 in)
- Operating speed: 60 km/h (37 mph) average with halts
Route map
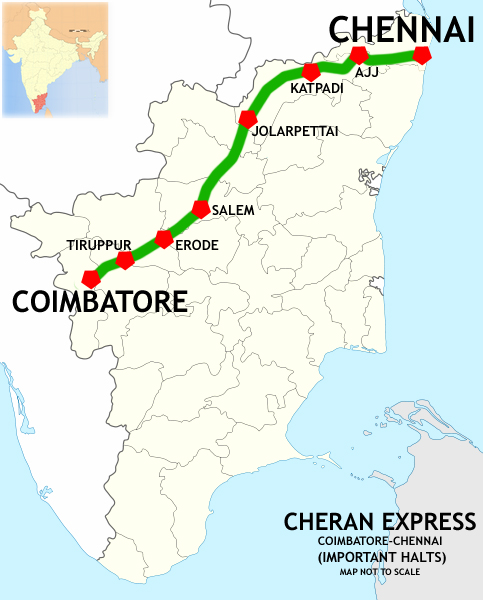

Coimbatore–Chennai Central Superfast express (Train Nos 12681/12682) is a weekly express train run by Indian Railways between Coimbatore city Junction and Chennai Central.

== Service ==
The train starts on Fridays from Coimbatore and on Saturdays from Chennai Central, covering a total distance of 496 kilometres (308 mi) in approximately 8 hours.

== Schedule ==
Train number	Station code	Departure station	Departure time	Departure day	Arrival station	Arrival time	Arrival day
12681	MAS	Chennai Central	10:30 PM	Saturday	Coimbatore Junction	6:60 AM	Sunday
12682	CBE	Coimbatore Junction	11:30 PM	Friday	Chennai Central	7:20 AM	Saturday

== Route and stations ==
This train passes through five intermediate stations: Tiruppur, Erode, Salem, Katpadi and Arakkonam.

== Halt ==
All stops for 12681; runs only on Saturday

Station code	Station name	Time	Distance	Day
MAS	Chennai Central	10:30 PM (source)	O	Day 1
AJJ	Arakkonam Junction	11:28 PM	69	Day 1
KPD	Katpadi Junction	12:18 AM	130	Day 2
SA	Salem Junction	3:08 AM	334	Day 2
ED	Erode Junction	4:05 AM	396	Day 2
TUP	Tiruppur	4:38 AM	446	Day 2
CBE	Coimbatore Junction	6:40 AM (destination)	497	Day 2

All stops for 12682; runs only on Friday

Station code	Station name	Time	Distance	Day
CBE	Coimbatore Junction	11:30 PM (source)	0	Day 1
TUP	Tiruppur	11:55 PM	51	Day 1
ED	Erode Junction	12:45 AM	101	Day 2
SA	Salem Junction	1:40 AM	164	Day 2
KPD	Katpadi Junction	4:53 AM	367	Day 2
AJJ	Arakkonam Junction	5:43 AM	428	Day 2
PER	Perambur	6:33 AM	491	Day 2
MAS	Chennai Central	7:20 AM (destination)	497	Day 2

== Rake sharing ==
The Coimbatore–Chennai Central express has a rake sharing arrangement with the (Train No 12647/12648) Kongu Express.

== LOCO ==
The train is pulled by WAP-4 from Erode or Arakkonam.

== Coach composition ==
The train has standard ICF rakes with a maximum speed of 110 kmph.

- 1 AC II tier
- 2 AC III tier
- 14 sleeper coaches
- 3 general
- 2 second-class luggage/parcel van

Loco	1	2	3	4	5	6	7	8	9	10	11	12	13	14	15	16	17	18	19	20	21	22
	GRD	GEN	S1	S2	S3	S4	S5	S6	S7	S8	S9	S10	S11	S12	S13	S14	BE1	B1	A1	GEN	GEN	GRD
