= Erode–Tiruchirappalli line =

Railway line in India

Tiruchirappalli–Karur–Erode line
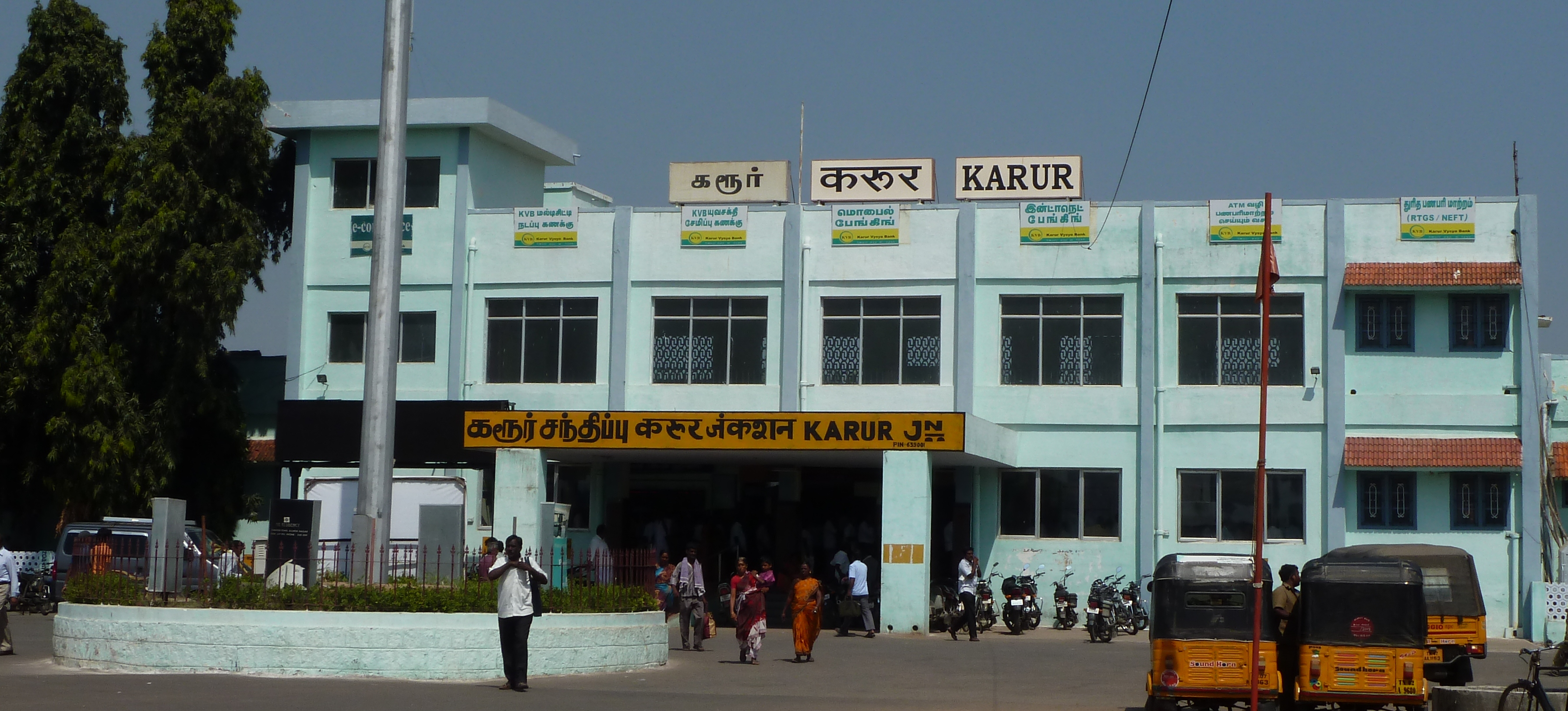
- Karur Junction lies on the Erode–Tiruchirappalli line

Overview
- Status: Operational
- Owner: Indian Railways
- Locale: Tamil Nadu
- Termini: Tiruchirappalli Junction (TPJ); Erode Junction (ED)
- Stations: 26
- Website: www.sr.indianrailways.gov.in

Service
- Services: 1
- Route number: 9/9A/46
- Operator: Southern Railway zone
- Depot(s): Erode (ED); Golden Rock (GOC)

Technical
- Line length: 141 kilometres (88 mi)
- Number of tracks: 1
- Track gauge: Broad Gauge - 1,676 mm (5 ft 6 in)
- Old gauge: Metre Gauge - 1,000 mm (3 ft 3 3/8 in)
- Electrification: Yes
- Highest elevation: Erode Junction 174 metres (571 ft); Karur Junction 120 metres (390 ft); Tiruchirappalli Junction 85 metres (279 ft)

Tiruchirappalli–Karur–Erode line is a railway line in Southern Railway zone of Indian Railways. It runs between Erode Junction and Tiruchirappalli Junction.

== History ==
The construction of this line began connecting South Indian Railway and Madras Railway. Erode Junction on Jolarpettai–Shoranur line was under Madras Railway whereas Tiruchirappalli Junction was under South Indian Railway.

== High-speed trial ==
A high-speed trial run has been conducted along this line to increase the speed of trains. This trial run at 125kmph was attempted to increase the operating speed of trains from 100kmph to 110kmph along this section.

== Gauge conversion ==
The metre-gauge line has been converted into broad gauge during 1929. In September 1929, the entire stretch of 141 kilometres (88 mi) has been completely converted into broad gauge in just 5 hours of time. The first broad-gauge train from Erode Junction reached Tiruchirappalli Junction, exactly 5 hours after the reach of last metre-gauge train. The route has been electrified in February 2018.
