= Karur Junction railway station =

Railway station in Tamil Nadu, India

Coordinates: 10.95°N 78.08°E

Karur Junction Karur Sandhippu
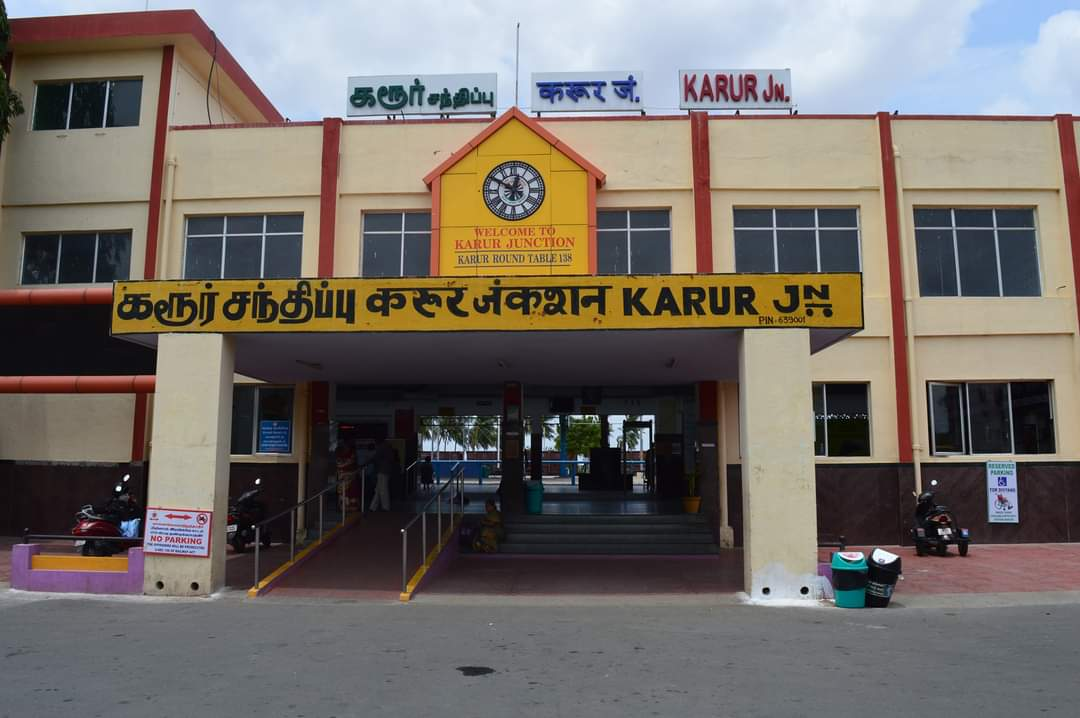
- Main building of Karur Junction railway station

General information
- Location: Neelimedu, Karur, Karur district, Tamil Nadu; India
- Elevation: 38 metres (125 ft)
- System: Indian Railways station
- Owner: Indian Railways
- Operator: Southern Railway zone
- Line: Tiruchirappalli–Karur–Erode line Template:Salem–Karur–Dindigul line
- Platforms: 5
- Tracks: 7
- Connections: Aut

Construction
- Structure type: Standard
- Parking: available

Other information
- Status: Functioning
- Station code: KRR
- Zone(s): Southern Railway zone
- Division(s): Salem

History
- Opened: March 12; 2014 years ago
Route map
Location

Karur Junction railway station (station code: KRR) is an NSG–4 category Indian railway station in Salem railway division of Southern Railway zone. It is a junction station located in the city of Karur in the Indian state of Tamil Nadu. It is situated along with Erode and Tiruchirapalli. The station is a junction for incoming trains from Tiruchirappalli, Salem and Dindigul towards Jolarpettai–Chennai line through Erode Junction.

== History ==
It was the first railway station in India to have a broad-gauge track. It was installed in the late 1860s, in a period even when all Indian railway stations, including Mumbai, Delhi, Kolkata and Chennai, were on narrow gauge.

A 5 ft 6 in (1,676 mm) broad gauge line linking the station to Salem via Namakkal was opened in 2014. The station is a part of the Salem railway division of the Southern Railways. Karur is one of the List 'A' class junction in Salem division and one of the top revenue junctions in Southern Railways. Indian Railways has proposed doubling of Salem-Karur-Dindigul and Erode-Karur Line in the 2020 budget.

== Lines ==
Four single BG electric lines branch out from the Junction:

1. BG Single Electric Line Towards Salem Via Namakkal, Rasipuram
2. BG Single Electric Line Towards Dindigul
3. BG Single Electric Line Towards Erode Via Kodumudi
4. BG Single Electric Line Towards Tiruchirappalli Via Kulithalai

== Projects and development ==
It is one of the 73 stations in Tamil Nadu to be named for upgradation under Amrit Bharat Station Scheme of Indian Railways.

== Awards and achievements ==
In 2019, the station was granted ISO–14001 certification for complying with NGT (nation Green Tribunal).

== Incidents ==
- About 40 farmers in the district who had parted with their lands for the Salem–Karur BG line project filed a petition seeking adequate compensation as directed by the court.
- Six children, aged under 7 years old and a teacher travelling in a school van had a miraculous escape when their vehicle hit a slowing train at an unstaffed level crossing at Kallumadai near the station in February 2014.
