= Erode Junction railway station =

Railway station in Tamil Nadu, India

Erode Junction
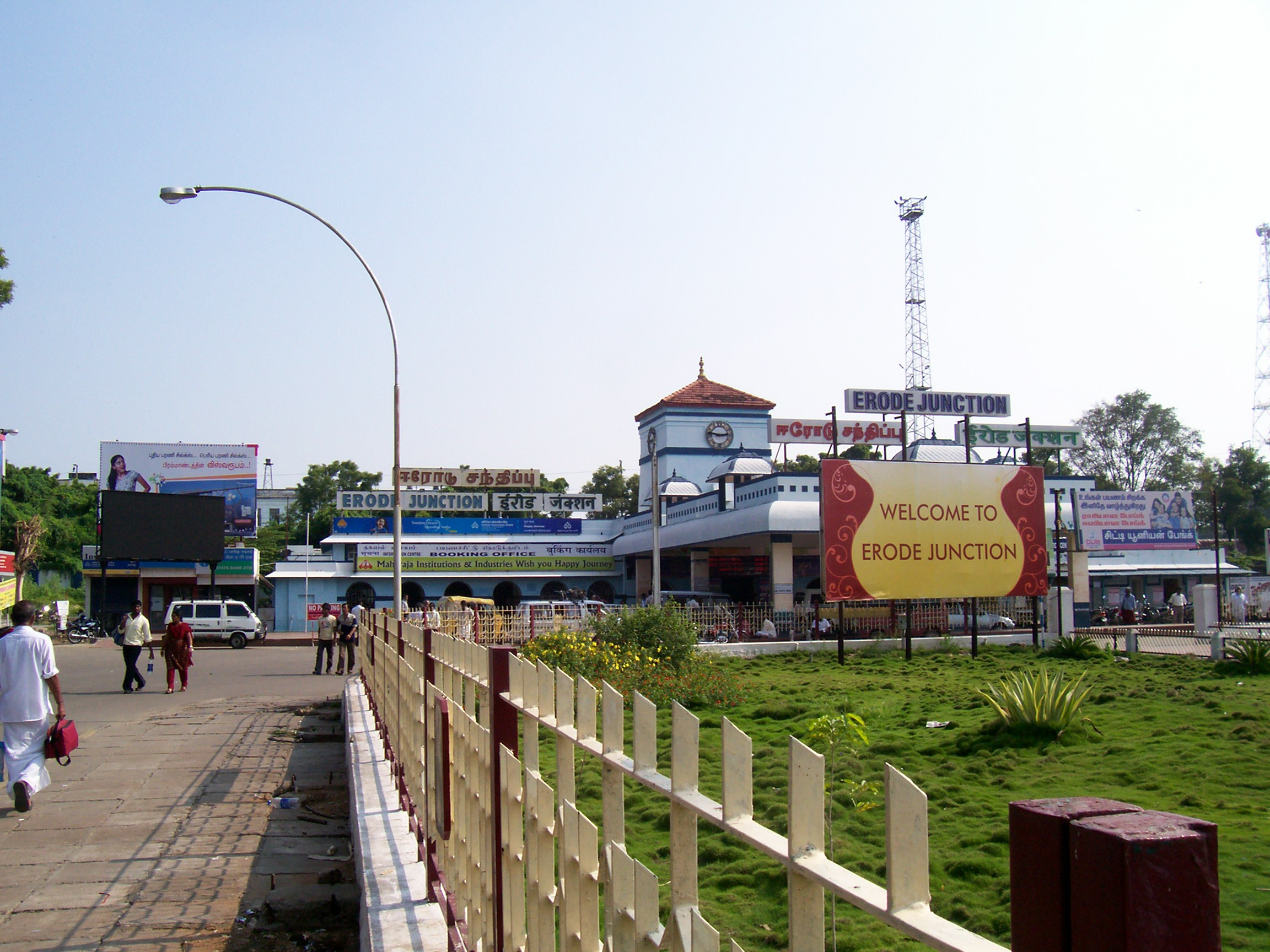
- Erode Junction railway station

General information
- Location: Erode, Erode district Tamil Nadu; India
- Coordinates: 11°19′35″N 77°43′15″E
- System: Commuter and Regional rail station
- Owner: Ministry of Railways (India)
- Operator: Indian Railways
- Lines: Jolarpettai–Shoranur line; Erode–Tiruchirappalli line; Erode–Palani line (proposed)
- Distance: 60 km (37 mi) from Salem Junction; 101 km (63 mi) from Coimbatore Junction
- Platforms: 4 Island platforms
- Tracks: 22

Construction
- Structure type: At-grade
- Parking: Available
- Cycle facilities: Available

Other information
- Station code: ED
- Zone(s): Southern Railway
- Division(s): Salem
- Classification: Non-suburban 2(NSG 2)

History
- Opened: 1862; 164 years ago
- Electrified: 1990
Route map
Location
- Location within Tamil Nadu Location within India

Erode Junction railway station (station code: ED) is an NSG–2 category Indian railway station in Salem railway division of the Southern Railway zone. It is the main railway junction serving the city of Erode, Tamil Nadu, India. Erode Junction is one of the major railway Junction in the Southern Railway zone of the Indian Railways and is located 3 km away from Erode Central Bus Terminus. There is an ISO certified diesel locomotive shed and an electric loco shed attached with Erode Junction.

== History ==
The station was established in 1862 and was connected by the first electrified broad-gauge link from Chennai Central.

During Under the rule of British India, a new line, gauge unspecified, is shown as proposed and construction from Erode to Nanjangud via Satyamangalam, Killegal and Chamrajanagar, to link up with Bangalore. But it hadn't been materialized.

A recent survey has been undertaken in 2007 for the proposed 91.5 km section of Erode–Palani line project.

== Structure and layout ==
The station has four side platforms and can handle up to 165 trains.

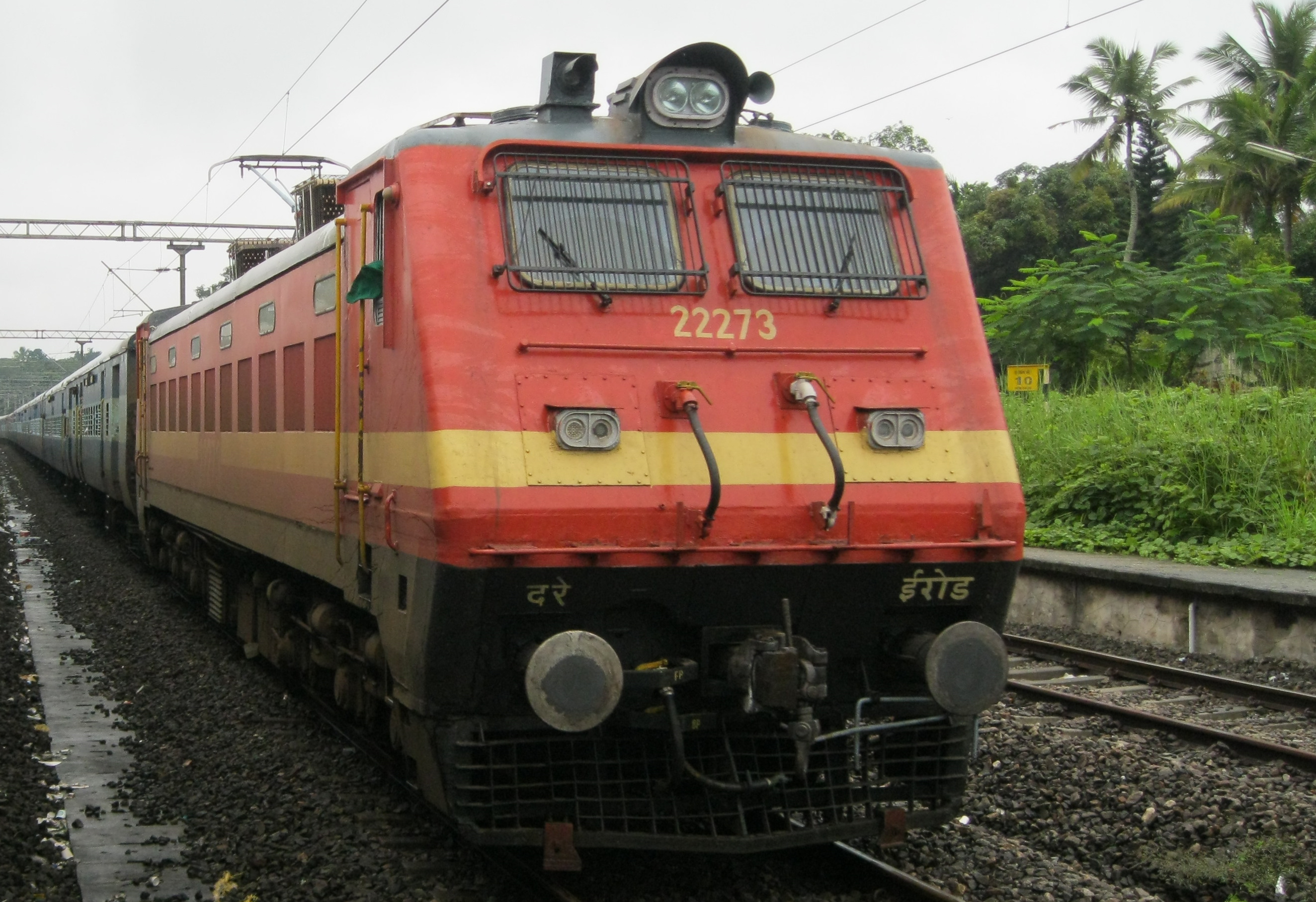
WAP-4 loco belonging to Electric Loco Shed, Erode

== Lines ==
Line no.	Towards	Passing through	Line	Track / Type
1	Palakkad Junction	Tiruppur, Coimbatore/Podanur	Jolarpettai–Shoranur line	Broad gauge – Double track – Electrified
2	Salem Junction	Sankari	Jolarpettai–Shoranur line	Broad gauge – Double track – Electrified
3	Karur Junction	Kodumudi	Erode–Tiruchirappalli line	Broad gauge – Single track – Electrified

== Locomotive sheds ==
Erode Junction loco shed is one among the very few stations in India which houses both diesel and electrical locomotives. Erode loco shed currently houses 350 electric and diesel locomotives, making it one of the largest loco sheds operated by Indian Railways. The ISO certified electric locomotive shed houses WAP-4, WAG-7 and WAP-7 Locomotives. The diesel loco shed set up in 1962, houses over 120 WDM-2 and WDM-3A, 11 WDP-4D, 11 WDG-4 (only GT46ACe wide cab versus) diesel locomotives. The trains passing through Erode junction often have a long technical halt in order to carry out engine swapping and maintenance checks.

== Projects and development ==
It is one of the 73 stations in Tamil Nadu to be named for upgradation under Amrit Bharat Station Scheme of Indian Railways.

== Awards and achievements ==
In 2019, the station was granted ISO–14001 certification for complying with NGT (nation Green Tribunal).
