= Mettupalayam Road, Coimbatore =

Road in Tamil Nadu, India

Mettupalayam Road
- Native name: மேட்டுப்பாளையம் சாலை (Tamil)
- Maintained by: Highways and Minor Ports Department; Coimbatore City Municipal Corporation
- Length: 10 km (6.2 mi)
- South end: Rangai Gownder Street, Coimbatore
- North end: Thudiyalur, Coimbatore

Mettupalayam Road, (NH 181) is a major arterial road in city of Coimbatore, Tamil Nadu, India. This NH runs for about 10 kilometers starting exactly from Rangai Gownder street up to the northern Thudiyalur within the corporation limits.Beyond that the road continues northwards for a distance of 26 kilometres till Mettupalayam. It is six metres (20 ft) wide in most stretches. The road narrows at the stretches between Edayar street, RG street and Flower Market areas. Green Corridor system is under implementation between Chintamani and Thudiyalur to synchronise traffic signals, as it is one of the most congested stretches in the city. This road connects the city with Saibaba Colony Bus Terminus and the northern suburbs in the Coimbatore Metropolitan Area.

== Features and alignment ==
The National Highways Authority of India(NHAI) has proposed bypass road from Neelambur on NH47 and will join Mettupalayam Road at Narasimhanaickenpalayam. This would help ease the traffic on the road. It is one of the widely used stretches in the city, with a large number of tourists using the road to reach the tourism destination of Ooty.

== North Coimbatore Flyover ==
The flyover was opened in 1992 to reduce traffic congestion by a railway line connecting Coimbatore Junction and Coimbatore North Junction

== Goundampalayam Flyover ==
Currently a four lane Flyover is under construction by bypassing to reduce traffic congestion at Goundampalayam and GN Mills junctions on the Mettupalayam Road. The Goundampalayam flyover has been constructed during the period of Dr.V.SAMUTHIRAKANI, M.E., PhD who was working as Divisional Engineer of that project and opened to traffic during 2023.

== Railway stations along Mettupalayam Road ==
- Coimbatore North Junction railway station
- Thudiyalur railway station
- Periyanaickenpalayam railway station
- Karaimadai railway station

== Places transversed ==
- RG Street
- City market(Poo market)
- Chintamani circle
- Sai Baba colony
- Goundampalayam
- GN Mills
- Thudiyalur

== Cinemas ==
- PVR Cinemas @Brookefields Mall - 06 Screens
- Baba Cinemas - 02 Screens
- Sri Sakthi Kalpana Cinemas A/C 4K Dolby Atmos, Koundampalayam - 02 Screens
- Sri Murugan Cinema A/C 4K Dolby Atmos, Thudiyalur
- Cosmo Cinemas, A/C 4K Dolby Atmos Narasimhanaickenpalayam
