= Thudiyalur railway station =

Railway station in Tamil Nadu, India

Thudiyalur

General information
- Location: TNP Nagar, Railway station Road, Thudiyalur, Coimbatore, Tamil Nadu
- Coordinates: 11.082396°N 76.948188°E
- Elevation: 452.29 metres (1,483.9 ft)
- System: Indian Railways station
- Owner: Indian Railways
- Line: Coimbatore–Mettupalayam line
- Platforms: 1

Construction
- Parking: Available
- Cycle facilities: Yes
- Accessible: Yes

Other information
- Status: Functional
- Station code: TDE
- Zone(s): Southern Railway zone
- Division(s): Salem
Route map
Location
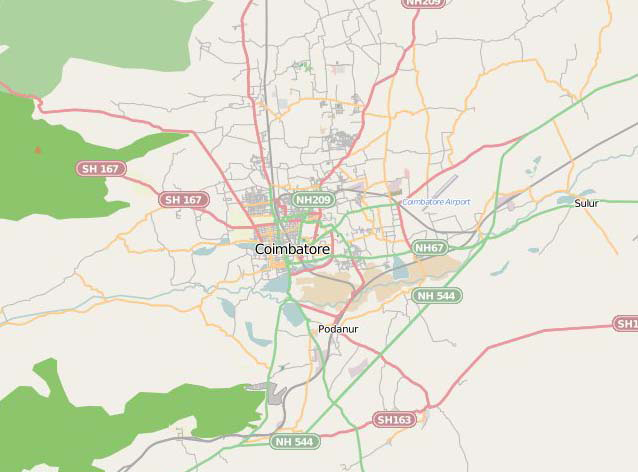
- Location within Coimbatore Location within Tamil Nadu Location within India

Thudiyalur railway station is a suburban railway station of Coimbatore. It is a station in between Coimbatore Junction and Mettupalayam. The station was reopened by Railway minister Suresh Prabhu. Recently Thudiyalur railway station building was refurbished and the station started functioning from July 3, 2017 onwards. Thudiyalur railway station is just 800 meter from Thudiyalur bus stand.

There is huge acres of land available for railways here, earlier CRPF Goodshed is planned near the railway station.

== Administration ==
The station is operated by the Southern Railway zone of the Indian Railways and comes under the Salem railway division.

== Lines ==
The station has one platform and a line connecting Mettupalayam and Coimbatore.

== Services ==
This station handles local passenger MEMU trains between Mettupalayam railway station and Coimbatore Junction. It just takes 10 to 15 minutes to reach Coimbatore Junction and 25 minutes to reach Mettupalayam railway station from Thudiyalur railway station and fare is also just Rs.10 in both directions. And"monthly pass" is just Rs.100 per person for both up and down trips to Coimbatore.

Train timings at Thudiyalur station

Train No.	Towards	Time	Stops	Service
06009	Coimbatore Junction	08.45 AM	Coimbatore North Junction	Monday to Sunday
06813	Coimbatore Junction	11.15 AM	Coimbatore North Junction	Monday to Saturday (Sunday not available)
06815	Coimbatore Junction	13.20 PM	Coimbatore North Junction	Monday to Sunday
06817	Coimbatore Junction	17.10 PM	Coimbatore North Junction	Monday to Sunday
06823	Coimbatore Junction	19.38 PM	Coimbatore North Junction	Monday to Saturday (Sunday not available)

Train No.	Towards	Time	Stops	Service
06812	Mettupalayam railway station	09.50 AM	Periyanaickenpalayam, Karamadai	Monday to Sunday
06814	Mettupalayam railway station	12.00 PM	Periyanaickenpalayam, Karamadai	Monday to Saturday (Sunday not available)
06816	Mettupalayam railway station	15.55 PM	Periyanaickenpalayam, Karamadai	Monday to Sunday
06010	Mettupalayam railway station	18.05 PM	Periyanaickenpalayam, Karamadai	Monday to Sunday
06822	Mettupalayam railway station	20.40 PM	Periyanaickenpalayam, Karamadai	Monday to Saturday(Sunday not available)
