= Tolasampatti railway station =

Railway station in Tamil Nadu, India

Tolasampatti

General information
- Location: Salem, Tamil Nadu, India
- Coordinates: 11°45′42″N 77°58′49.6″E
- Elevation: 294 metres (965 ft)
- System: Indian Railways station
- Owner: Indian Railways
- Line: Salem Junction–Shoranur Junction line
- Platforms: 1
- Tracks: 1

Construction
- Structure type: On ground

Other information
- Status: Active
- Station code: TOS
- Zone(s): Southern Railway zone
- Division(s): Salem
- Fare zone: Southern Railway zone
Location
- Location within India Location within Tamil Nadu

Tolasampatti railway station is located between Mettur Dam and Mecheri Road.
