= Mecheri Road railway station =

Railway station in Tamil Nadu, India

Mecheri Road

General information
- Location: Salem, Tamil Nadu, India
- Coordinates: 11°48′16.07″N 77°55′19.7″E
- Elevation: 345 metres (1,132 ft)
- System: Indian Railways station
- Owner: Indian Railways
- Line: Salem Junction–Shoranur Junction line
- Platforms: 1
- Tracks: 1

Construction
- Structure type: On ground

Other information
- Status: Active
- Station code: MCRD
- Zone(s): Southern Railway zone
- Division(s): Salem
- Fare zone: Southern Railway zone
Location

Mecheri Road railway station (station code: MCRD) is an NSG–6 category Indian railway station in Salem railway division of Southern Railway zone. It is located between Mettur Dam and Omalur Junction.
