= Mavelipalaiyam railway station =

Railway station in Tamil Nadu, India

Mavelipalaiyam

General information
- Location: Salem, Tamil Nadu, India
- Coordinates: 11.4827°N 77.9001°E
- Elevation: 294 metres (965 ft)
- System: Indian Railways station
- Owner: Indian Railways
- Line: Salem Junction–Shoranur Junction line
- Platforms: 2
- Tracks: 2

Construction
- Structure type: On ground

Other information
- Status: Active
- Station code: MVPM
- Zone(s): Southern Railway zone
- Division(s): Salem
- Fare zone: Southern Railway zone
Location
- Location within India Location within Tamil Nadu

Mavelipalaiyam railway station (station code: MVPM) is an NSG–6 category Indian railway station in Salem railway division of Southern Railway zone. It is a station in Tamil Nadu, India, located between Madudanchavadi and Sankaridurg.
