= Anangur railway station =

Railway station in Tamil Nadu, India

Anangur

General information
- Location: Kumarapalayam-Tirucengodu Rd, Near Nettavelampalayam, Anangur, Tamil Nadu, India
- Coordinates: 11.3985°N 77.8211°E
- Elevation: 221 metres (725 ft)
- System: Indian Railways station
- Owner: Indian Railways
- Line: Salem Junction–Shoranur Junction line
- Platforms: 2
- Tracks: 2

Construction
- Structure type: At grade

Other information
- Status: Active
- Station code: ANU
- Zone(s): Southern Railway zone
- Division(s): Salem
- Fare zone: Southern Railway zone
Location
- Location within India Location within Tamil Nadu

Anangur railway station (station code: ANU) is an NSG–6 category Indian railway station in Salem railway division of Southern Railway zone. It serves the village of Anangur in Komarapalayam Taluk, Namakkal district, Tamil Nadu, India. It is located between Sankaridurg and Cauvery.
