= Cauvery railway station =

Railway station in India

Coordinates: 11.350763°N 77.760825°E

Kaveri
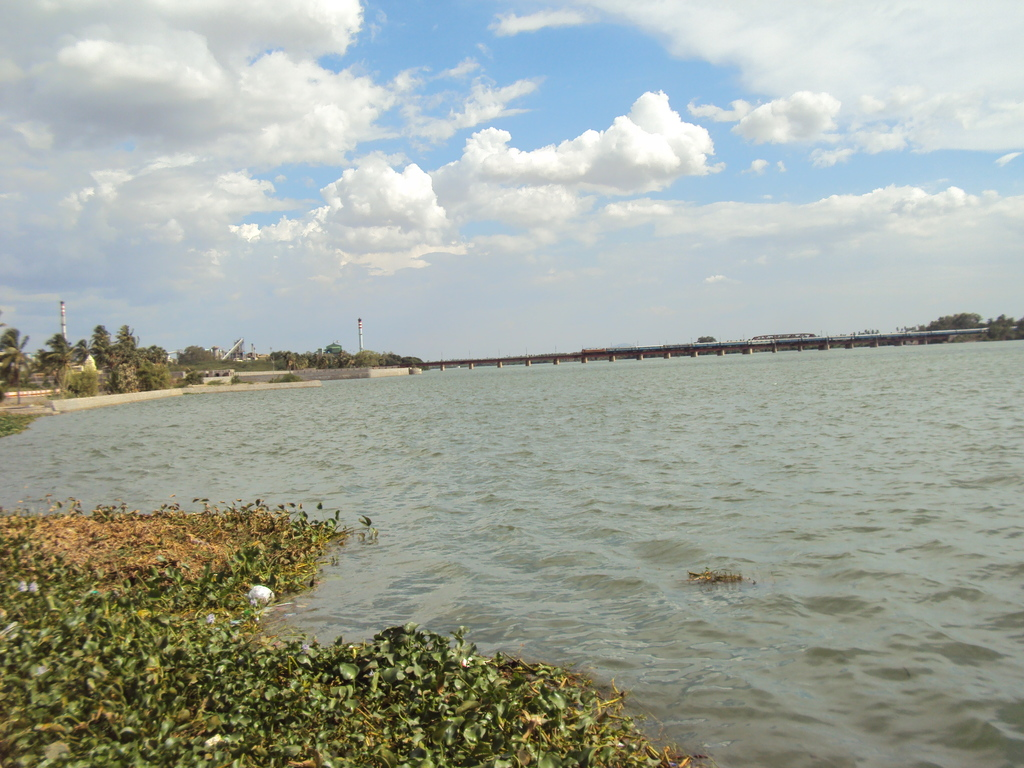
- A train cruises over Kaveri river next to the station near Pallipalayam, Tamil Nadu

General information
- Location: Cauvery RS, Pallipalayam, Tamil Nadu
- Owner: Indian Railways
- Line: Jolarpettai–Shoranur line
- Platforms: 2
- Tracks: 4

Construction
- Structure type: Standard on-ground station
- Parking: Available
- Cycle facilities: Not Available

Other information
- Status: Active
- Station code: CV
- Fare zone: Southern Railway zone

History
- Former names: Madras and Southern Mahratta Railway
Location
- Location within India Location within Tamil Nadu

Cauvery railway station (station code: CV) is an NSG–6 category Indian railway station in Salem railway division of Southern Railway zone. It is a railway station in Pallipalayam in Namakkal district of Tamil Nadu. The name is derived from Kaveri River, which flows in its close proximity.

== Location and layout ==
It is situated in between Erode Junction railway station and Sankaridurg railway station (and Salem Junction) in the Chennai Central–Trivandrum section. It is located near the city of Erode, just 6 km from it. It lies in the busy section of Chennai–Trivandrum in Salem railway division. Kaveri railway station is operated by the Chennai-headquartered Southern Railways of the Indian Railways. The station is used as shuttle station for Erode Junction. All the passenger trains running between Erode Junction and Salem Junction will have a stop at here.
