= Neykkarapatti railway station =

Railway station in Tamil Nadu, India

Neykkarapatti

General information
- Location: Uthamasolapuram, Salem, Tamil Nadu, India
- Coordinates: 11°36′46.2″N 78°05′47.9″E
- Elevation: 260 metres (850 ft)
- System: Indian Railways station
- Owner: Indian Railways
- Line: Salem Junction–Shoranur Junction line
- Platforms: 0
- Tracks: 2

Construction
- Structure type: On ground

Other information
- Status: Active
- Station code: NEA
- Zone(s): Southern Railway zone
- Division(s): Salem
- Fare zone: Southern Railway zone
Location

Neykkarapatti railway station is located between Salem Junction and Virapandy Road.
