= Nilgiri Express =

Train in India

Nilgiri Superfast Express
Overview
- Service type: Superfast
- Locale: Tamil Nadu
- First service: 12 May 1862; 164 years ago
- Current operator: Southern Railway

Route
- Termini: MGR Chennai Central (MAS); Mettupalayam (MTP)
- Stops: 7
- Distance travelled: 531 km (330 mi)
- Average journey time: 9 hours 10 minutes
- Service frequency: Daily
- Train number: 12671 / 12672

On-board services
- Classes: AC First Class, AC 2 Tier, AC 3 Tier, AC 3 Tier Economy, Sleeper Class, General Unreserved
- Seating arrangements: Yes
- Sleeping arrangements: Yes
- Auto-rack arrangements: no 0
- Catering facilities: Available
- Observation facilities: Large windows
- Baggage facilities: Available
- Other facilities: Below the seats

Technical
- Rolling stock: LHB coach
- Track gauge: 1,676 mm (5 ft 6 in)
- Electrification: yes
- Operating speed: 58 km/h (36 mph) average including halts.
Route map
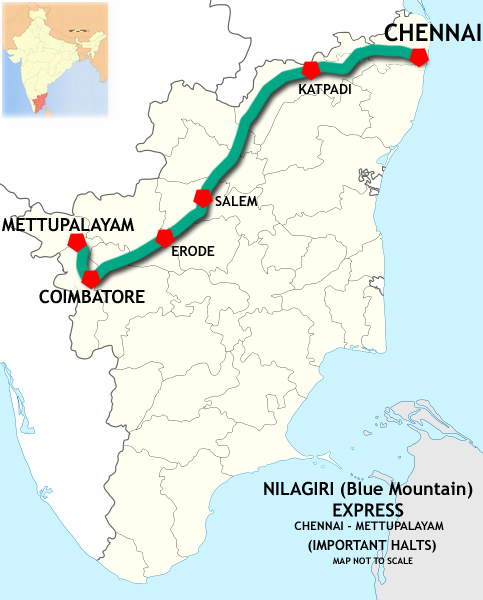
- Nilagiri (Blue Mountain) Express Route map

The 12671 / 12672 Nilgiri Superfast Express (also known as the Blue Mountain Express) is a express train service operating between Chennai Central and Mettupalayam, Coimbatore in Tamil Nadu, India. It is operated by Indian Railways.

== Introduction ==
This train is named after the Nilgiri (Tamil : English - (Nil - Blue; giri - Mountain)) Hills. The train is primarily intended for travellers to these hills, especially to the towns of Ooty, Kotagiri and Coonoor. Mettupalayam is near Coimbatore, which is situated at the foothills, and the Nilgiri Express links to the Nilgiri passenger train operated by the Nilgiri Mountain Railway (NMR) at Mettupalayam railway station, enabling passengers to complete the journey to Udagamandalam by rail.

== History ==
The Nilgiri Express started to connect Coimbatore to Beypore on 12 May 1862 owing to track completion between Salem & Coimbatore whose completion led it run as Salem Beypore Ordinary Service. Later it connected Madras to Beypore with through Coach attached at Podanur towards Beypore. Owing to low traffic, Beypore Mail service was discontinued till Calicut was connected in 1888 to Madras (Podanur Beypore Mail was named Malabar Express in 1907 when Mangalore was connected to Madras). Nilgiri Express acted as link to MG Blue Mountain Express for Ooty with through coach attached to Podanur Calicut Mail. The train still exists past NMR being designated as an UNESCO World Heritage site in 2005 with Ooty Mettupalayam Passenger acting as a connecting train. This train had a dark blue colored rake with white stripes above and below the windows, distinct from other trains till 1997-98 other trains had maroon/brick colored coaches. The rake colour was later changed to standard ICF Blue. As of March 2025 the rake was converted to LHB.

== Train numbers ==
The Nilgiri Express is a daily overnight service in both directions. Train number 12671 runs from Chennai Central to Mettupalayam, while train number 12672 runs from Mettupalayam to Chennai Central. This train is maintained at Basin Bridge Junction Railway Yard, Chennai. This train has a dedicated rake with rake sharing along with Mangalore Central Superfast (12686/12685).

== Train Timings ==
The train starts from MGR Chennai Central at 21:05 and arrives at Mettupalayam at 06:20. For return journey, it starts from Mettupalayam at 21:20 and arrives at MGR Chennai Central at 06:25. The train runs daily.

== Stops and distance covered ==
1. MGR Chennai Central 0 kilometres (0 mi)
2. Arakkonam Junction 69.7 kilometres (43.3 mi)
3. Katpadi Junction130.2 kilometres (80.9 mi)
4. Salem Junction 334.5 kilometres (207.8 mi)
5. Erode Junction 394.5 kilometres (245.1 mi)
6. Tiruppur 444 kilometres (276 mi)
7. Coimbatore North Junction498 kilometres (309 mi)
8. Coimbatore Junction 494 kilometres (307 mi)
9. Mettupalayam 532 kilometres (331 mi)

== Booking quota ==
The train is intended for travellers to and from the Nilgiris District of Tamil Nadu. Though the train does not enter the district, the main towns in the Nilgiris have designated seats and berths on this train allocated for sale at local booking offices. Ooty, Coonoor, Wellington, Aruvankadu, Ketti, Kotagiri and Gudalur all have this provision. Notably, the latter two do not even have any rail connectivity.

== Loco links ==
The train is hauled by an Erode Junction(ED) WAP7 or Arakkonam Junction(AJJ) WAP4 or a Royapuram(RPM) WAP7 electric locomotive from MGR Chennai Central(MAS) to Mettupalayam(MTP) and the return journey. At Coimbatore Junction(CBE), there is a loco & rake reversal. The 38 kilometres (24 mi)Coimbatore-Mettupalayam stretch was electrified in 2007, and the same locomotive is used to haul the train in this section in both directions.

== See also ==
- Nilgiri Mountain Railway
- Rail transport in India
