= Chennai–Salem Express =

Passenger train in India

Chennai Egmore – Salem Express
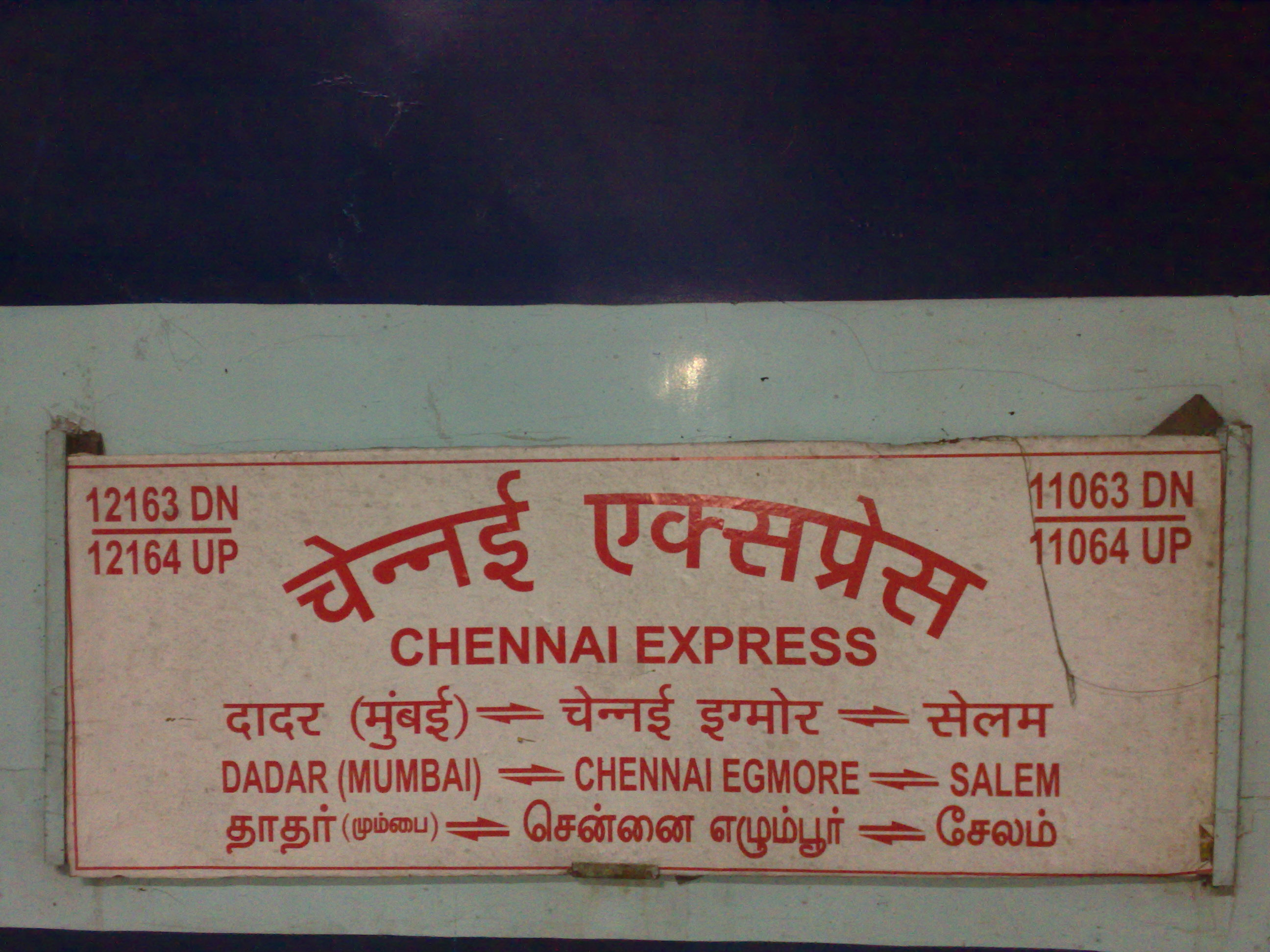
- Name board of Chennai Egmore - Salem Express

Overview
- Service type: Inter-city / Superfast Superfast
- Status: Operating
- Locale: Tamil Nadu
- First service: 8 August 2008; 17 years ago
- Current operator: Central Railway zone since rake is shared with 22157/22158 Mumbai-Chennai Mail
- Former operator: Southern Railway zone during Meter Gauge era

Route
- Termini: Chennai Egmore (MS); Salem Junction (SA)
- Stops: 12
- Distance travelled: 354 km (220 mi)
- Average journey time: 6 Hours 20 Minutes
- Service frequency: Daily
- Train number: 22153/54
- Lines used: Chord line (MS – VRI); Virudhachalam–Salem line (VRI – SA)

On-board services
- Classes: 2A, 3A, SL, SLR, SLRD and UR/GS
- Disabled access: Disabled access
- Seating arrangements: Corridor coach (UR/GS only)
- Sleeping arrangements: Couchette car
- Auto-rack arrangements: No
- Catering facilities: On-board
- Observation facilities: Windows in all carriages
- Entertainment facilities: No
- Baggage facilities: Overhead racks Baggage carriage
- Other facilities: Electrical outlets

Technical
- Rolling stock: Locomotive: WAP 4//5/7 (ED/AJJ/RPM); WAP 7 (RPM); Bogie: One AC 2-tier (2A); 4 AC 3-tier (3A); Nine II SL; Two UR/GS; Two SLR; One Pantry car
- Track gauge: 1,676 mm (5 ft 6 in)
- Electrification: No
- Operating speed: 56 kilometres per hour (35 mph)
- Track owner: Central Railway zone
- Timetable number: 7/7A
Route map
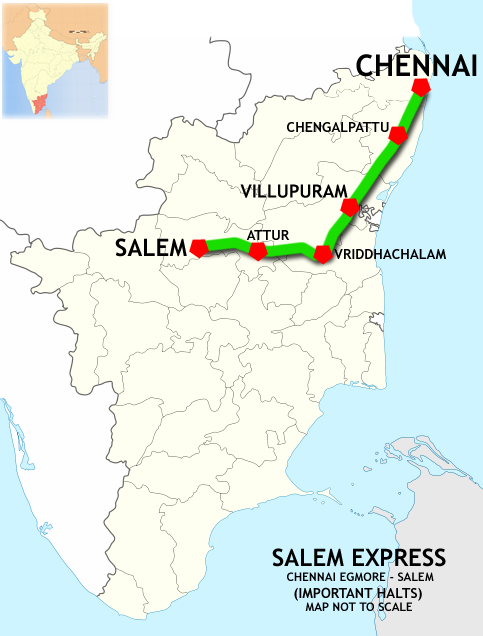

The 22153/22154 Chennai Egmore - Salem Junction Express is an express train which runs from Salem to Chennai via Vridhachalam and Villupuram in Tamil Nadu State India. This train is operated by Southern Railway in India and the rakes are owned by Central Railway. The train was inaugurated on 7 August 2008. The Train runs with 9 Sleeper class, 1 Second AC and 4 Third AC Coaches. It is an overnight train and runs daily in both directions. This train is assigned 22153 number in the Chennai - Salem direction and 22154 number in the Salem - Chennai direction. This train is also fondly called as Mango Express by locals and railfans because Salem is famous for Mangoes.

== History ==
This train was operated as a link/slip typed express train with only one coach during meter gauge era. The single train coach was attached with Pearl City Express till Vriddhachchalam Junction and after that the lone slip coach is detached at Vriddhachalam Junction and continues its journey towards Salem Junction via Chinna Salem. Introduction of a separate Train from Madras to Salem demanded Hon'ble MP R. KOLANTHAIVELU on 15–03–1979. Due to the demand, After the Broad Gauge Conversion, this train was reintroduced on 7 August 2008 with two dedicated rakes and this train also had a slip coaches in broad gauge era. After getting 2 dedicated rakes for daily operation, some of the coaches are detached from this train at salem junction and proceed its journey towards Mettur Dam Railway Station via Omalur Junction, Mecheri Road to boost Tourism. But later that slip train was cancelled around 2018 due to several reasons. After cancellation of that slip coaches, a connection train facility at Salem Junction is provided for this Express train till Mettur Dam by utilising Erode Mettur Dam Passenger train. Recently petitions regarding extension of this train to Mettur Dam ared being filed in Madras High Court by Tamil Nadu Railway Passengers Front.

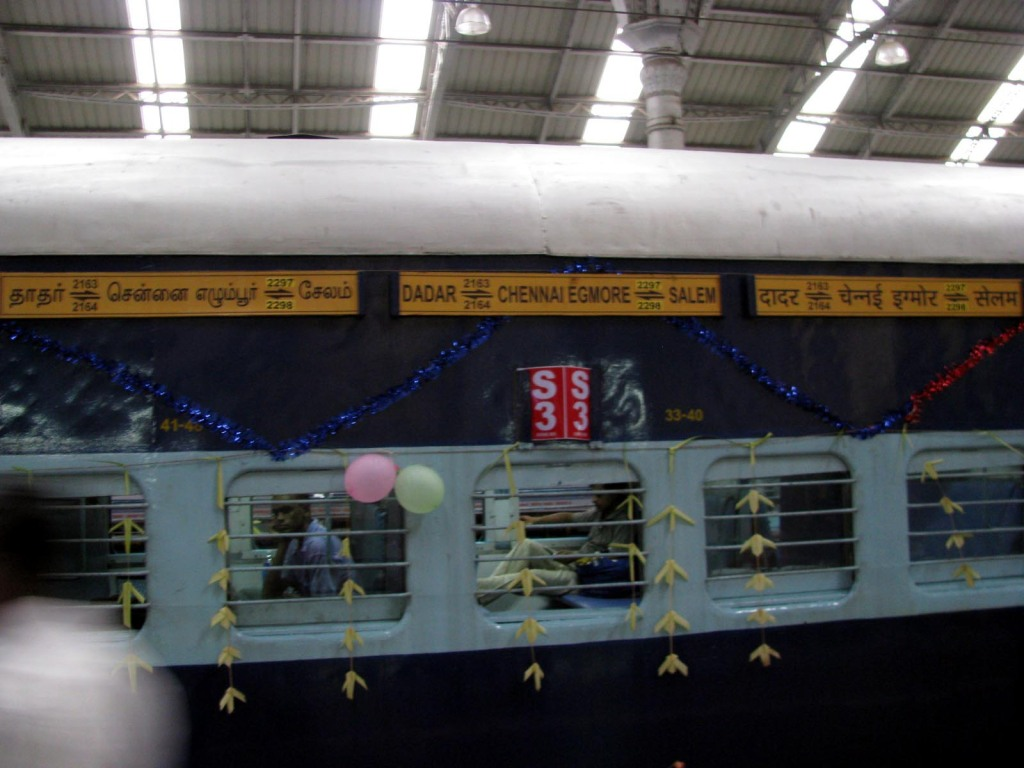
Chennai Egmore-Salem express at Egmore

== Current route and timings ==
The important stops are as follows:

- Salem Junction
- Attur
- Chinna Salem
- Vriddhachchalam Junction (Rake Reversal Takes Place)
- Villupuram
- Melmaruvathur
- Chengalpattu
- Tambaram
- Chennai Egmore

Timings of 22153 Up MS/Chennai Egmore-SA/Salem Junction Express:- Chennai Egmore 23.55 PM; Salem Junction 06.15 AM. Timings of 22154 Down SA/Salem Junction-MS/Chennai Egmore Express:- Salem Junction 21.30 PM; Chennai Egmore 03.50 AM.

The train undergoes reversal at VRI/Vriddhachchalam Junction in both up and down journeys. 22153 proceeds to Mettur Dam Railway Station from Salem Junction after transhipment with a passenger train coming from Erode Junction. 22154 comes from Mettur Dam Railway Station as a passenger train going to Erode Junction at Salem Junction then transhipment happens.

== Coach composition ==
The Upwards - 22153 train Coach composition is:

- 1 AC Two-tier coach (A1)
- 4 AC Three-tier coaches (B1, B2, B3, B4)
- 8 Sleeper Coaches (S1 - S9)
- 2 Unreserved General Sitting Coaches (GS)
- 1 Pantry Car
- 2 Sitting cum Luggage Rakes

The Downwards - 22154 train Coach composition is in exact reverse order of The Upwards - 22153 train Coach composition

Loco	1	2	3	4	5	6	7	8	9	10	11	12	13	14	15	16	17	18	
	SLR	GS	S9	S8	S7	S6	S5	S4	S3	S2	PC	S1	B4	B3	B2	B1	A1	GS	SLR

The pantry car remains locked.

== Rake sharing ==
It shares its rake with the 22157/22158 Mumbai Csmt Chennai Egmore Superfast Express.

== Demands ==
There are also demands to divert and operate this train via neyveli, vadaloor, cuddalore port junction since these areas has very less train connectivity and there are no trains operated in-between chennai and neyveli areas and there are also demands to extend this train till bangalore's under construction sir m visveswaraya terminal via hosur and dharmapuri since these areas also doesn't have any train connection with its state capital chennai.
