= Jolarpettai–Shoranur line =

Railway line in India

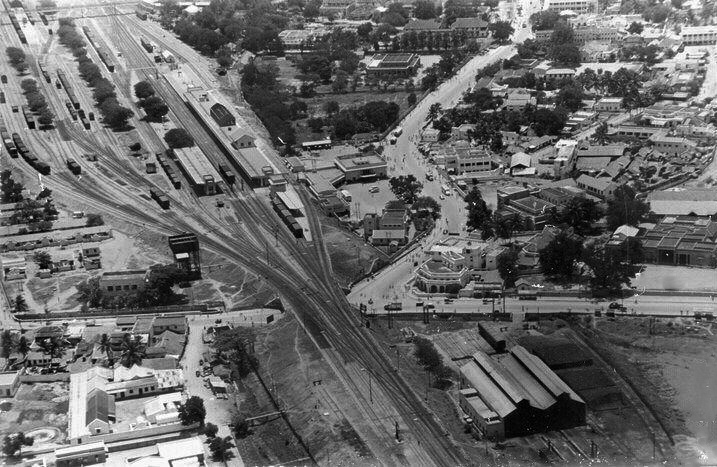
- Line passing through Coimbatore Junction, 1930s

Overview
- Status: Operational
- Owner: Indian Railways
- Locale: Tamil Nadu, Kerala

Service
- Operator: Southern Railway
- Depot(s): Erode (Electric, Diesel)
- Rolling stock: Indian Railways coaching stock

History
- Opened: 1861

Technical
- Line length: 366 km (227 mi) (Main)
- Track gauge: 5 ft 6 in (1,676 mm) broad gauge
- Electrification: 25 kV AC Overhead catenary
- Operating speed: 130 km/h (81 mph)

The Jolarpettai–Shoranur line is a 5 ft 6 in (1,676 mm) broad gauge railway line connecting Jolarpettai in Tamil Nadu and Shoranur in Kerala. Incoming from Chennai, the railway line branches from the Chennai Central–Bangalore City line at Jolarpettai and proceeds towards Shoranur before further radiating out.

== History ==
The Madras Railway was established in 1845 and the construction on the first main line in South India between Royapuram in Madras and Arcot started in 1853, which became operational on 1 July 1856. Madras Railway extended its trunk route from Madras to Beypore near Kozhikode in 1862. The line passed through Jolarpettai connecting Coimbatore before passing through the Palghat gap and proceeded towards Shoranur. In 1908, Madras Railway merged with Southern Mahratta Railway to form the Madras and Southern Mahratta Railway. In April 1951, the line became part of the Southern Railway zone after the Indian Railways was re-organized into six zonal systems.

== Stations and depots ==
There are two locomotive sheds operated by Southern Railway at Erode. The Diesel Loco Shed holds WDM-3D, WAP-1, WAP-4, WAG-5 and WAG-7 locomotives. The Electric Loco Shed holds WAG-7, WAP-4 and WAP-7 locomotives. There is a trip shed at Jolarpettai and a MEMU shed at Palakkad. Coimbatore, Salem, Erode and Palakkad, on the line, are among the major and top booking stations of the Indian Railways.

== Network ==
Jolarpettai–Shoranur line is a 5 ft 6 in (1,676 mm) broad gauge railway line stretching for 366 km (227 mi) from Jolarpettai in Tamil Nadu to Shoranur in Kerala. The main line is classified as a "Group B" line where trains can operate at speeds upto 130 km/h (81 mph). The line connects with several other main and branch lines:

Line	Start	End	Type	Gauge	Electrified	No. of Lines	Length	Connection with Line	Operator	Established
Chennai Central-Bangalore City	Chennai Central	Bangalore City	Main	Broad	Yes	2	213 km (132 mi)	Jolarpettai	SR	1864
Shoranur-Mangalore	Shoranur	Mangalore	Main	Broad	Yes	2	315 km (196 mi)	Shoranur	SR	
Shoranur-Ernakulam	Shoranur	Cochin Harbour	Main	Broad	Yes	2	107 km (66 mi)	Shoranur	SR	
Salem-Mettur Dam	Salem	Mettur Dam	Branch	Broad	Yes	2	38.9 km (24.2 mi)	Salem	SR	1929
Salem-Dindigul	Salem	Dindigul	Branch	Broad	Yes	1	159 km (99 mi)	Salem	SR	2013
Salem-Virudhachalam	Salem	Virudhachalam	Branch	Broad	Yes	1	139 km (86 mi)	Salem	SR	1931
Omalur-Yesvantpur	Omalur	Yesvantpur	Branch	Broad	No	1	194 km (121 mi)	Omalur	SWR	1969
Erode-Tiruchirappalli	Erode	Tiruchirappalli	Branch	Broad	Yes	1	141 km (88 mi)	Erode	SR	1866
Coimbatore North-Mettupalayam	Coimbatore North	Mettupalayam	Branch	Broad	Yes	1	32.8 km (20.4 mi)	Coimbatore North	SR	1873
Podanur-Irugur	Podanur	Irugur	Branch	Broad	Yes	1	10.9 km (6.8 mi)	Podanur	SR	1873
Podanur-Pollachi	Podanur	Pollachi	Branch	Broad	Yes	1	40 km (25 mi)	Podanur	SR	
Palakkad–Pollachi line	Palakkad	Pollachi	Branch	Broad	Yes	1	57.8 km (35.9 mi)	Palakkad	SR	1932
Shoranur -Nilambur line	Shoranur	Nilambur Road	Branch	Broad	Yes	1	65.8 km (40.9 mi)	Shoranur	SR	

The mainline operates on 25 kV AC overhead catenary and was electrified in stages, starting with the Jolarpettai–Morappur sector in 1989–90. Electrification was completed from Morappur to Salem Junction in 1990–91 and was extended to Erode Junction in 1991–92, Coimbatore Junction in 1995–96, and Shoranur in 1996–97. The branch lines were electrified in different stages starting from the Magnesite–Mettur Dam sector in 1990–91 to the Coimbatore–Mettupalayam branch line in 2015.
