= Magudanchavadi railway station =

Railway station in Tamil Nadu, India

Magudanchavadi

General information
- Location: Salem, Tamil Nadu, India
- Coordinates: 11°33′5.2″N 77°59′17.3″E
- Elevation: 242 metres (794 ft)
- System: Indian Railways station
- Owner: Indian Railways
- Line: Salem Junction–Shoranur Junction line
- Platforms: 2
- Tracks: 2

Construction
- Structure type: On ground

Other information
- Status: Active
- Station code: DC
- Zone(s): Southern Railway zone
- Division(s): Salem
- Fare zone: Southern Railway zone

History
- Opened: 1861
Location
- Location within India Location within Tamil Nadu

Magudanchavadi railway station is a railway station in Tamil Nadu, on the Salem Junction-Shoranur Junction line between Virapandy Road and Mavelipalayam.
