= Coimbatore North =

Coimbatore North may refer to these places in Coimbatore, Tamil Nadu, India:

- Coimbatore North (state assembly constituency)
- Coimbatore-North taluk
- Coimbatore North Junction railway station

== See also ==
- North Coimbatore Flyover
- Coimbatore (disambiguation)
