= Eriodu railway station =

Railway station in Tamil Nadu, India

Eriodu

General information
- Location: State Highway 74, Eriodu, Tamil Nadu, India
- Coordinates: 10.5159°N 78.0567°E
- Elevation: 258 metres (846 ft)
- System: Indian Railways station
- Owner: Indian Railways
- Line: Salem–Karur–Dindigul line
- Platforms: 1
- Tracks: 1

Construction
- Structure type: On-ground

Other information
- Station code: EDU
- Zone(s): Southern Railway zone
- Division(s): Salem
- Fare zone: Southern Railway zone
Route map
Location
- Location within India Location within Tamil Nadu

Eriodu railway station (station code: EDU) is an NSG–6 category Indian railway station in Salem railway division of Southern Railway zone. It is a railway station situated in Eriodu of Dindigul district in the Indian state of Tamil Nadu. The station is an intermediate station on the newly commissioned Salem Junction–Karur Junction line which became operational in May 2013. The station is operated by the Southern Railway zone of the Indian Railways and comes under the Salem railway division.
