= Coimbatore (disambiguation) =

Coimbatore, also known as Kovai, is a major city in the Indian state of Tamil Nadu.

Coimbatore may also refer to:

- Coimbatore district
  - Coimbatore District (Madras Presidency)
- Coimbatore International Airport
- Coimbatore Institute of Technology
- Coimbatore bypass
- Coimbatore Wet Grinder
- Coimbatore Municipal Corporation
- Coimbatore Mappillai
- Coimbatore Junction railway station
  - Coimbatore Junction Metro station
- Coimbatore Lok Sabha constituency
- Coimbatore metropolitan area
- Coimbatore Integrated Bus Terminus
- Coimbatore Metro

== See also ==
- Coimbatore North (disambiguation)
- Coimbatore South (disambiguation)
- Coimbatore East Assembly constituency, defunct
- Coimbatore West Assembly constituency, defunct
