= Magnesite Junction railway station =

Railway station in Tamil Nadu, India

Magnesite Junction

General information
- Location: BSCL Road, Salem District, Tamil Nadu; India
- Coordinates: 11.6964°N 78.0962°E
- Elevation: 313 metres (1,027 ft)
- System: Goods railway station
- Owner: Indian Railways
- Operator: Southern Railway zone
- Platforms: 2
- Tracks: 3

Construction
- Structure type: Standard (on ground station)
- Parking: Yes
- Accessible: Disabled access

Other information
- Status: Functioning
- Station code: MGSJ
- Zone(s): Southern Railway zone
- Division(s): Salem
Route map
- Source: Google Maps
Location
- Location within India Location within Tamil Nadu

Magnesite Junction railway station is a non–passenger junction railway station in Salem district in Tamil Nadu.

== Jurisdiction ==
It belongs to the Salem railway division of the Southern Railway zone of Salem district in Tamil Nadu. The station code is MGSJ.

== Lines ==
This junction station branches lines to Salem Junction to the south, Jolarpettai Junction to north and Omalur Junction to north–west.

== Notable places nearby ==
- Steel Authority of India
