= Thandoni railway station =

Railway station in Tamil Nadu, India

Thandoni

General information
- Location: 3rd Cross Road, Tamil Nadu Housing Board Colony, Gandhigramam, Karur, Tamil Nadu, India
- Elevation: 140 metres (460 ft)
- System: Indian Railways station
- Owner: Indian Railways
- Line: Salem–Karur–Dindigul line
- Platforms: 1
- Tracks: 1

Construction
- Structure type: On-ground

Other information
- Station code: TNDN
- Zone(s): Southern Railway zone
- Division(s): Salem
- Fare zone: Southern Railway zone
Route map
Location
- Location within India Location within Tamil Nadu

Thandoni railway station (Code: TNDN) is a railway station situated in Thandoni, Karur district in the Indian state of Tamil Nadu. The station is an intermediate station on the newly commissioned Salem Junction–Karur Junction line which became operational in May 2013. The station is operated by the Southern Railway zone of the Indian Railways and comes under the Salem railway division.
