= Velliyani railway station =

Railway station in Tamil Nadu, India

Velliyani

General information
- Location: Dindigul – Guziliamparai – Karur Rd, Velliyani, Karur, Tamil Nadu, India
- Coordinates: 10.8405°N 78.1155°E
- Elevation: 156 metres (512 ft)
- System: Indian Railways station
- Owner: Indian Railways
- Line: Salem–Karur–Dindigul line
- Platforms: 1
- Tracks: 1

Construction
- Structure type: On-ground

Other information
- Station code: VEI
- Zone(s): Southern Railway zone
- Division(s): Salem
- Fare zone: Southern Railway zone
Route map
Location
- Location within India Location within Tamil Nadu

Velliyani railway station (station code: VEI) is an NSG–6 category Indian railway station in Salem railway division of Southern Railway zone. It is a railway station situated in Velliyani, Karur district in the Indian state of Tamil Nadu. The station is an intermediate station on the newly commissioned Salem Junction–Karur Junction line which became operational in May 2013. The station is operated by the Southern Railway zone of the Indian Railways and comes under the Salem railway division.
