= Sankari Durg railway station =

Railway station in Tamil Nadu, India

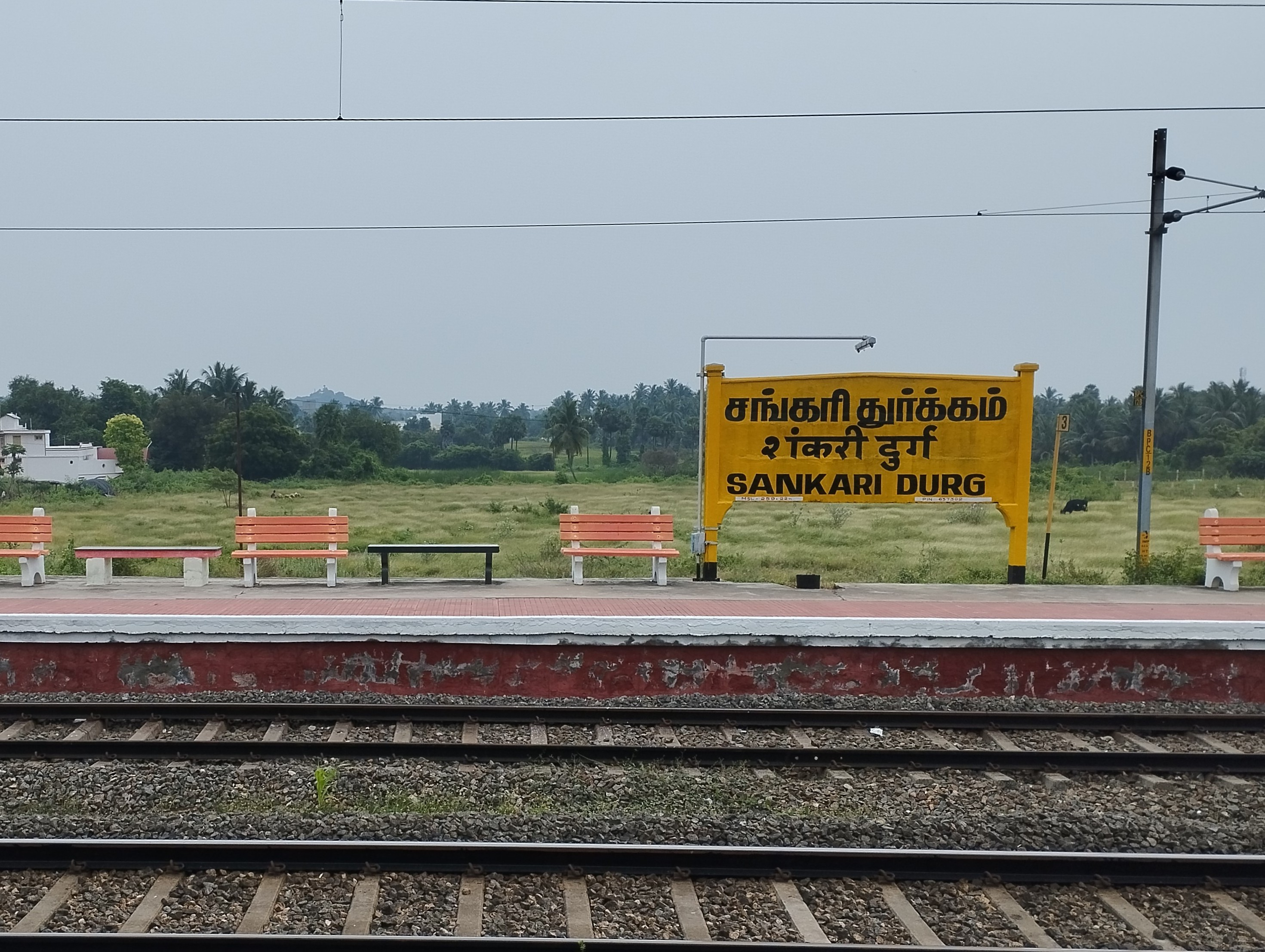

General information
- Other names: Sangagiri
- Location: Salem; Tamil Nadu; India
- Coordinates: 11°26′47″N 77°52′15″E
- System: Regional rail station
- Owner: Ministry of Railways (India)
- Operator: Indian Railways
- Line: Jolarpettai–Shoranur line
- Distance: 5 km (3.1 mi) from Mavelipalaiyam; 8 km (5.0 mi) from Anangur
- Platforms: 2 Side platforms
- Tracks: 3

Construction
- Structure type: At-grade

Other information
- Station code: SGE
- Zone(s): Southern Railway
- Division(s): Salem
- Classification: Non-suburban 5 (NSG 5)
Route map
Location
- Location within Tamil Nadu Location within India

Sangagiri Railway Station (officially Sankari Durg railway station)(station code: SGE) is an NSG–5 category Indian railway station in Salem railway division of Southern Railway zone. It is located 3.5 km south of Sangagiri town in Tamil Nadu, India. It is located between Mavelipalaiyam and Anangur.
