= VBU =

VBU may refer to:

- VBU Volksbank im Unterland eG, a German bank
- Vinoba Bhave University, a state university located in Hazaribagh, Jharkhand, India
- Vembur railway station, the station code VBU
