= Karaimadai railway station =

Railway station in Tamil Nadu, India

Karaimadai

General information
- Location: Karaimadai, Coimbatore, Tamil Nadu, India
- Coordinates: 11.2391°N 76.9587°E
- Elevation: 372 metres (1,220 ft)
- System: Indian Railways station
- Owner: Indian Railways
- Line: Salem Junction–Shoranur Junction line
- Platforms: 1
- Tracks: 1

Construction
- Structure type: On ground

Other information
- Status: Active
- Station code: KAY
- Zone(s): Southern Railway zone
- Division(s): Salem
- Fare zone: Southern Railway zone

History
- Electrified: Single electric line
Location

Karaimadai railway station (station code: KAY) is an NSG–6 category Indian railway station in Salem railway division of Southern Railway zone. It is a station in the Coimbatore suburb of Karamadai, Tamil Nadu, India. It is located between Periyanaickenpalayam and Mettupalayam.
