= North Coimbatore Flyover =

North coimbatore flyover
- வடகோவை மேம்பாலம்
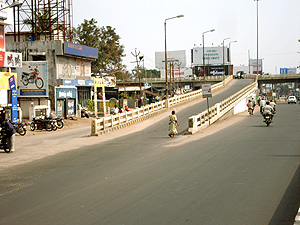

Location
- Coimbatore, India
- Coordinates: 11.016764°N 76.954882°E
- Roads at junction: Mettupalayam road, Cross cut road

Construction
- Type: Flyover
- Lanes: 2
- Constructed: 1996
- Opened: 1996

Coimbatore North Flyover is a flyover in coimbatore. It is built across the railway line connecting coimbatore main junction and coimbatore north junction.

== History ==
Construction began in August 1991 and ended five years later. Earlier there was a malfunctioning railway gate here, which used to cause huge traffic snarls during peak hours. This flyover was built to replace that traffic gate. The flyover was built to ease traffic congestion.

== Location ==
It is located in Mettupalayam Road, Coimbatore.

== Gallery ==
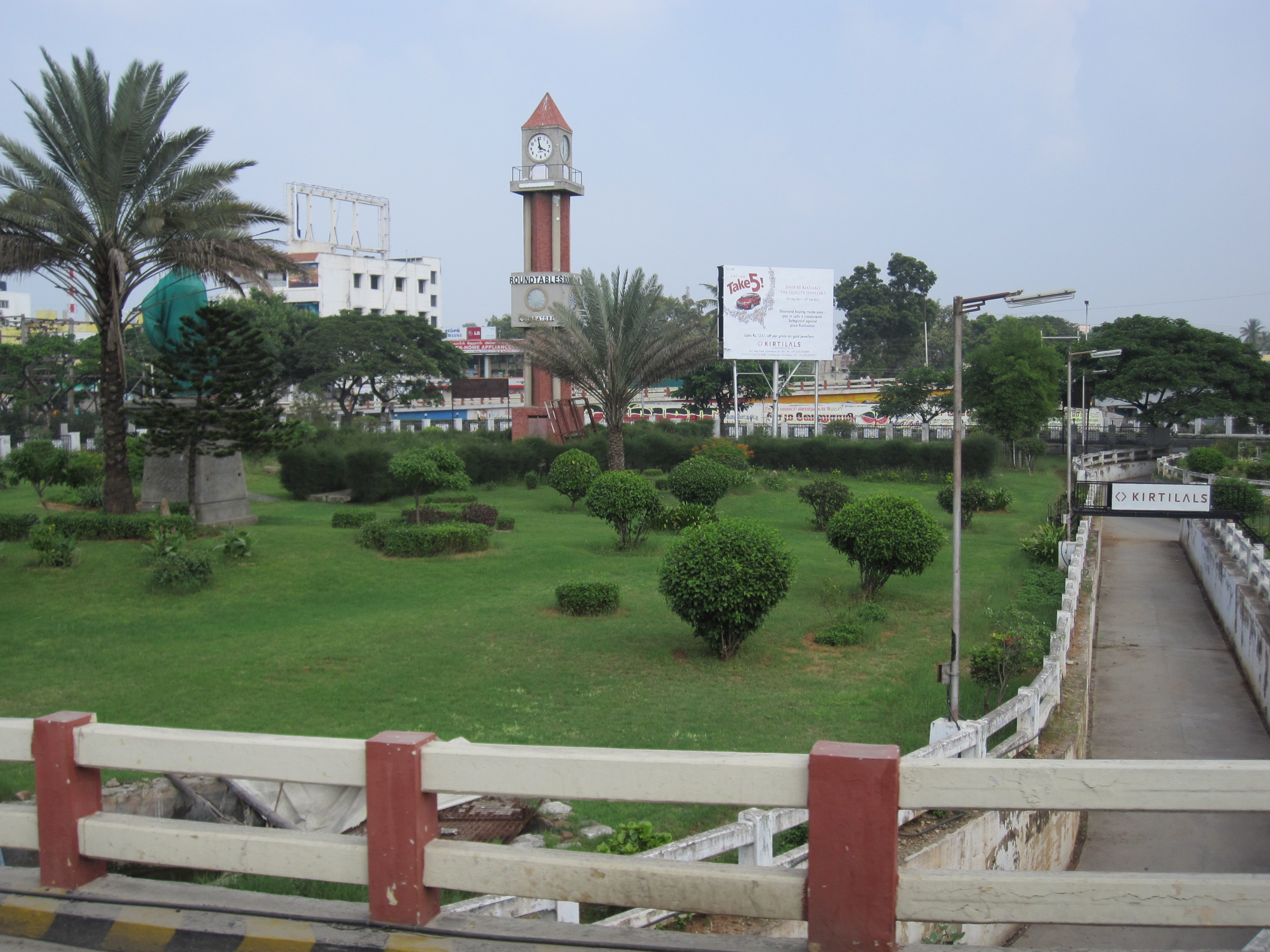

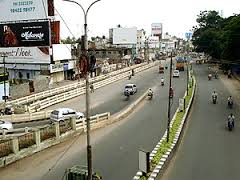

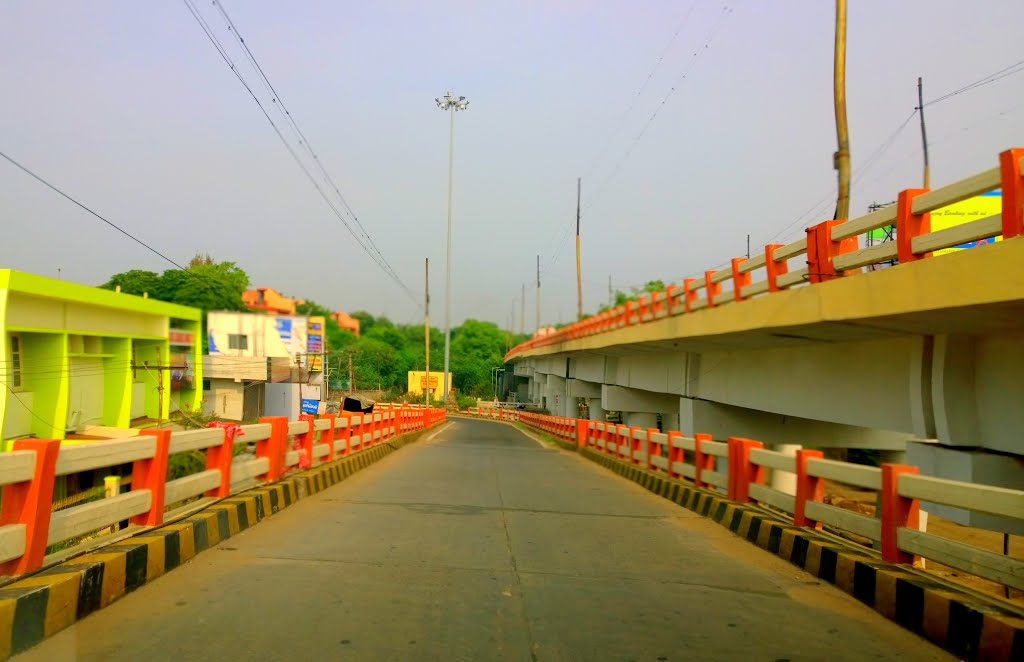

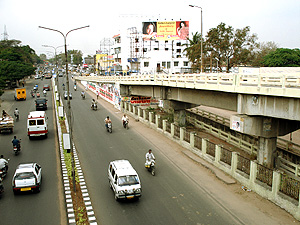

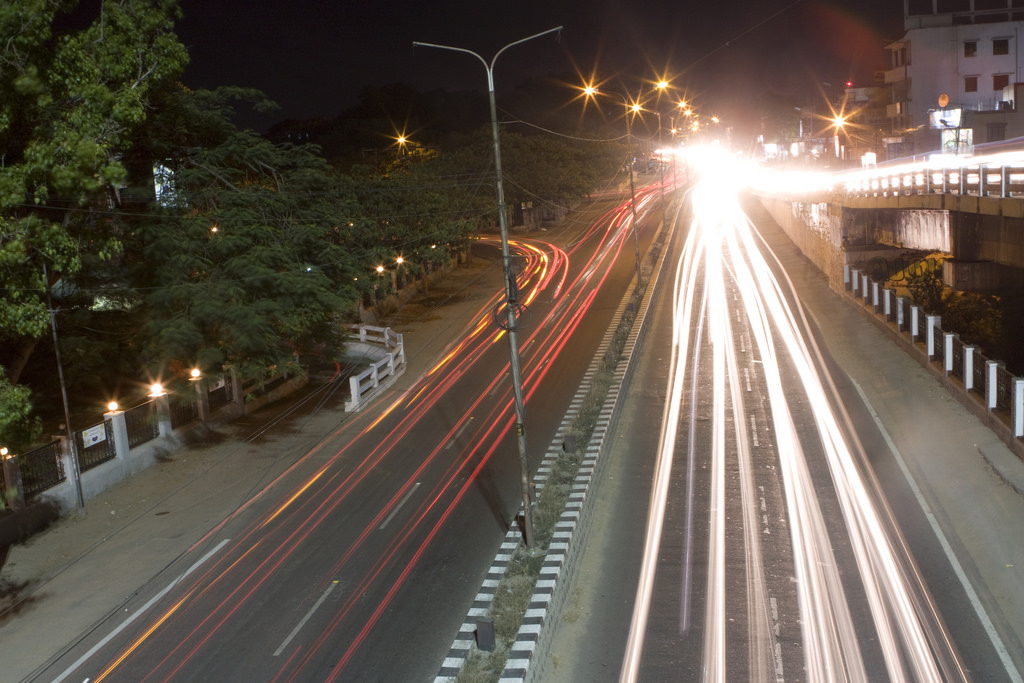
