= Gounder Mills =

Coordinates: 11°03′36″N 76°56′41″E

Gounder Mills (often called GN Mills) is a residential and developing commercial locality situated along Mettupalayam Road in Coimbatore, Tamil Nadu. It is situated on Mettupalayam Road, positioned between areas like Koundampalayam and Thudiyalur.

== Connectivity ==
The neighborhood mostly consists of middle-class families, featuring local markets, parks, and easy access to educational institutions like Kongunadu Arts and Science College.

It is connected by the TNSTC bus network along the main highway, with nearby hospitals (like V.G. Hospital) and ongoing residential real estate developments.
