= Wet grinder =

Grinder that uses liquid as lubrication

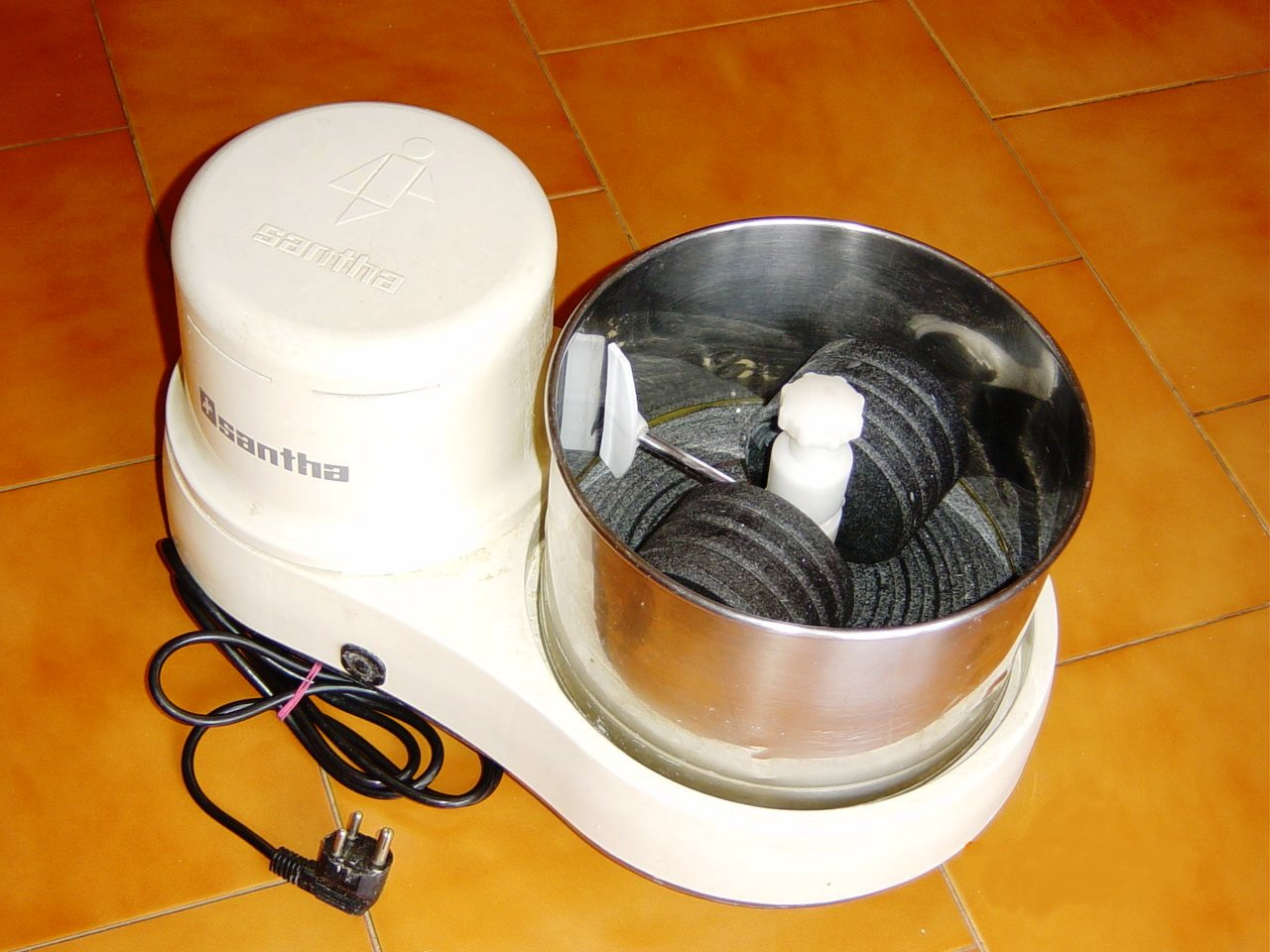
A tabletop wet grinder for preparing food

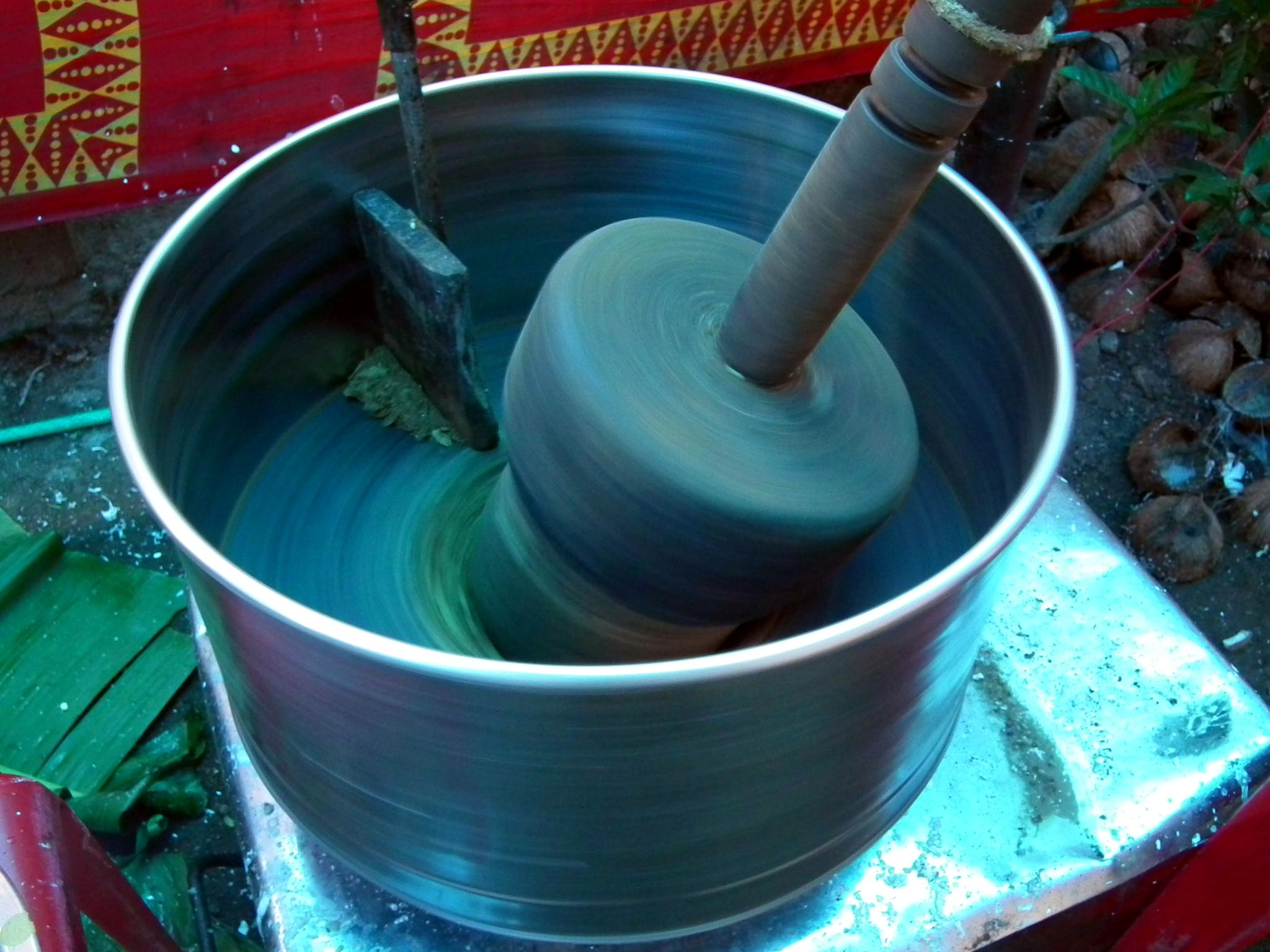
Professional wet grinder

A wet grinder can refer either to a tool for abrasive cutting of hard materials or to a food preparation appliance used especially in Indian cuisine for grinding food grains to produce a paste or batter. A wet grinder for abrasive cutting uses fluid for lubrication or cooling; for food preparation, a wet grinder combines water to grain as it is ground to produce a batter.

The tabletop wet grinder is derived from the melanger, which was developed by the chocolate industry in the early 19th century.

== Abrasive cutting wet grinders ==
Some angle grinders, most tile saws, and some grinders for sharpening blades used in woodworking are wet grinders. The fluid helps with lubrication of the cutting process and with cooling to avoid cracking or damaging the cutting tool or the workpiece.

== Food preparation wet grinders ==
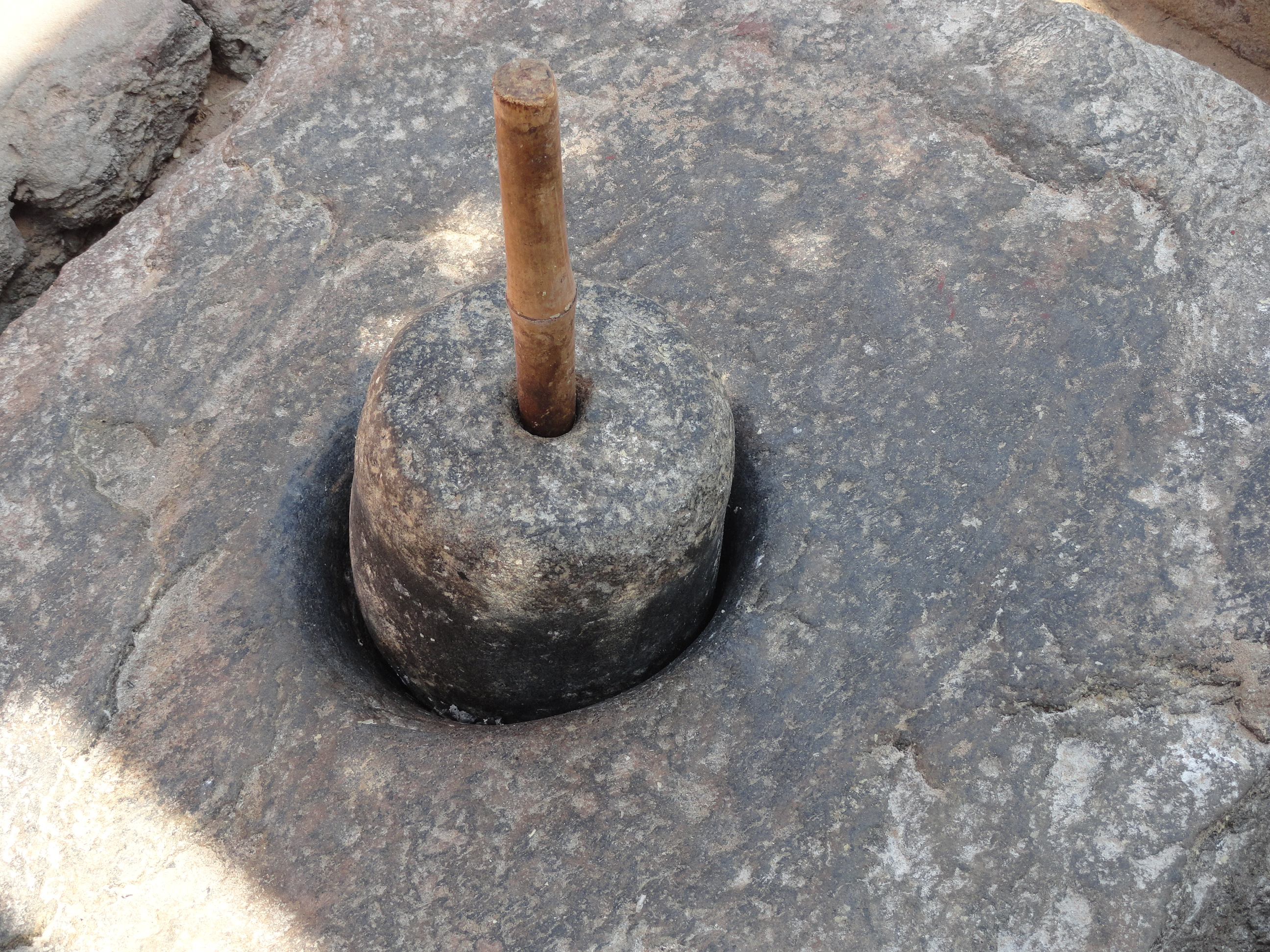
Traditional wet grinding stone, Rubbu Rolu (Telugu) or Attu Kallu (Malayalam - Tamil)

Wet grinding is rare in western cuisine but common in Indian cuisine. Wet grinders are used to make pastes from grains and lentils and is used extensively in South Indian cuisine for preparation of popular dishes such as dosa, idly, vada, appam and paniyaram. It consists of granite stones which rotate inside a metal drum with the help of an electric motor and the food grains get crushed between the stone and drum. Wet grinders have two advantages over electric mixers or blenders. First, the stone grinder generates less heat than a mixer; heat affects the flavor of the food. Second, the stones remain sharp for a greater time than do metal blades.

=== Types of wet grinders ===
Originally stones manually operated, modern wet grinders are available for both home usage and larger-scale commercial production. A wet grinder consists of granite stones rotating inside a metal drum with the help of an electric motor. Food grains are crushed between stones in the drum. Modern wet grinders may use grinding stones that are circular or conical. Wet grinders have some advantages over electric mixers or blenders. A stone grinder generates less heat than a mixer, and heat can affect the flavor of the food. Unlike mixers, which cut food into smaller pieces, a wet grinder crushes the food, resulting in different consistency.

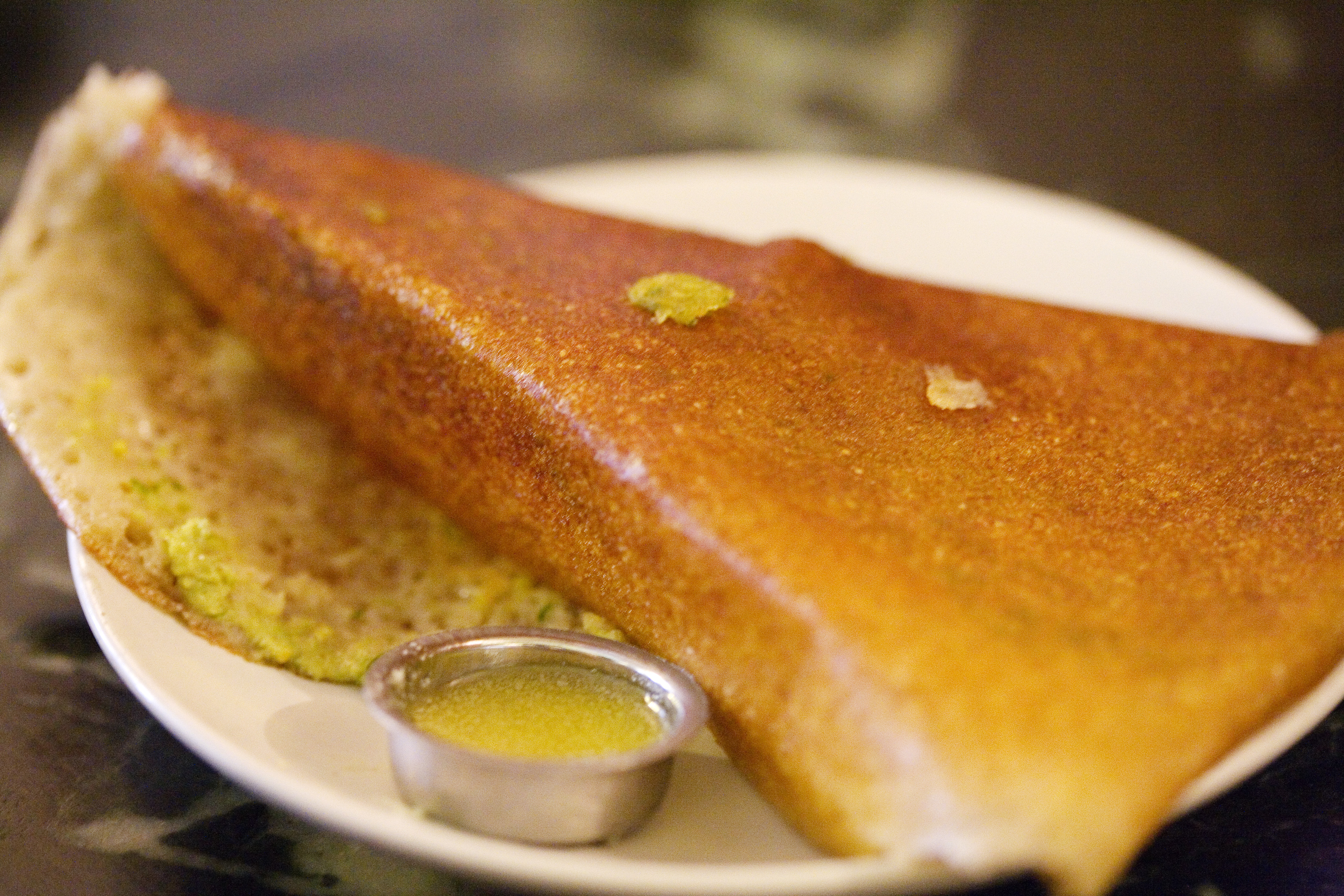
Dosa is made from a batter obtained by wet-grinding rice and pulses.

=== Geographical indication ===
In 2005, the Government of Tamil Nadu applied for Geographical Indication for Coimbatore wet grinder. Wet grinders are largely manufactured in Coimbatore because granite is easily available in this region. Beginning in March 2006, the label "Coimbatore Wet Grinder" is a registered geographical indication for Tamil Nadu.
