= Coimbatore–Mettupalayam branch line =

Overview
- Status: Operational
- Owner: Indian Railways
- Locale: Tamil Nadu
- Termini: Coimbatore Junction (CBE); Mettupalayam (MTP)
- Stations: 6

Service
- Operator(s): Southern Railway zone
- Depot(s): Coimbatore; Mettupalayam
- Rolling stock: WDM-2, WDM-3A, WDM-3D, WDG-3A diesel locos; and WAP-7 and WAP-4 electric locos.

History
- Opened: 1873

Technical
- Track length: Main line: 36 km (22 mi)
- Track gauge: 5 ft 6 in (1,676 mm) broad gauge
- Electrification: Yes
- Operating speed: 100 km/h
- Highest elevation: Coimbatore 411 metres (1,348 ft)

The Coimbatore–Mettupalayam branch line connects Coimbatore Junction and Mettupalayam in Tamil Nadu.

== History ==
The Coimbatore–Mettupalayam dual gauge 5 ft 6 in (1,676 mm) broad-gauge, 1,000 mm (3 ft 3 3/8 in) metre gauge line was opened to traffic in 1873. The Coimbatore–Mettupalayam section was converted to complete broad gauge in 1907. Dual gauge was retained between Podanur (PTJ), Coimbatore_Junction (CBE) and Coimbatore_North_Junction (CBF).,

== Electrification ==
The electrification of Coimbatore–Mettupalayam branch line was completed in 2015.

== Passenger movement ==
Stations like Coimbatore, Coimbatore North, Thudiyalur, Periyanaickenpalayam, Karamadai, Mettupalayam are on this line. Suburban areas are connected by this line.
