= Virapandy Road railway station =

Railway station in Tamil Nadu, India

Virapandy Road

General information
- Location: Virapandy Road, Ariyanur, Tamil Nadu, India
- Coordinates: 11°35′48.4″N 78°04′27.7″E
- Elevation: 270 metres (890 ft)
- System: Indian Railways station
- Owner: Indian Railways
- Line: Salem Junction–Shoranur Junction line
- Platforms: 2
- Tracks: 2

Construction
- Structure type: On ground

Other information
- Status: Active
- Station code: VRPD
- Zone(s): Southern Railway zone
- Division(s): Salem
- Fare zone: Southern Railway zone
Location
- Location within India Location within Tamil Nadu

Virapandy Road railway station (station code: VRPD) is an NSG–6 category Indian railway station in Salem railway division of Southern Railway zone. It is located in Salem Junction to Erode Junction line double electrified track;
