= Coimbatore South =

Coimbatore South may refer to these places in Coimbatore, Tamil Nadu, India:

- Coimbatore-South taluk
- Coimbatore South (state assembly constituency)

== See also ==
- Coimbatore (disambiguation)
