= Coimbatore Wet Grinder =

Type of wet grinder from Tamil Nadu, India

- Geographical indication
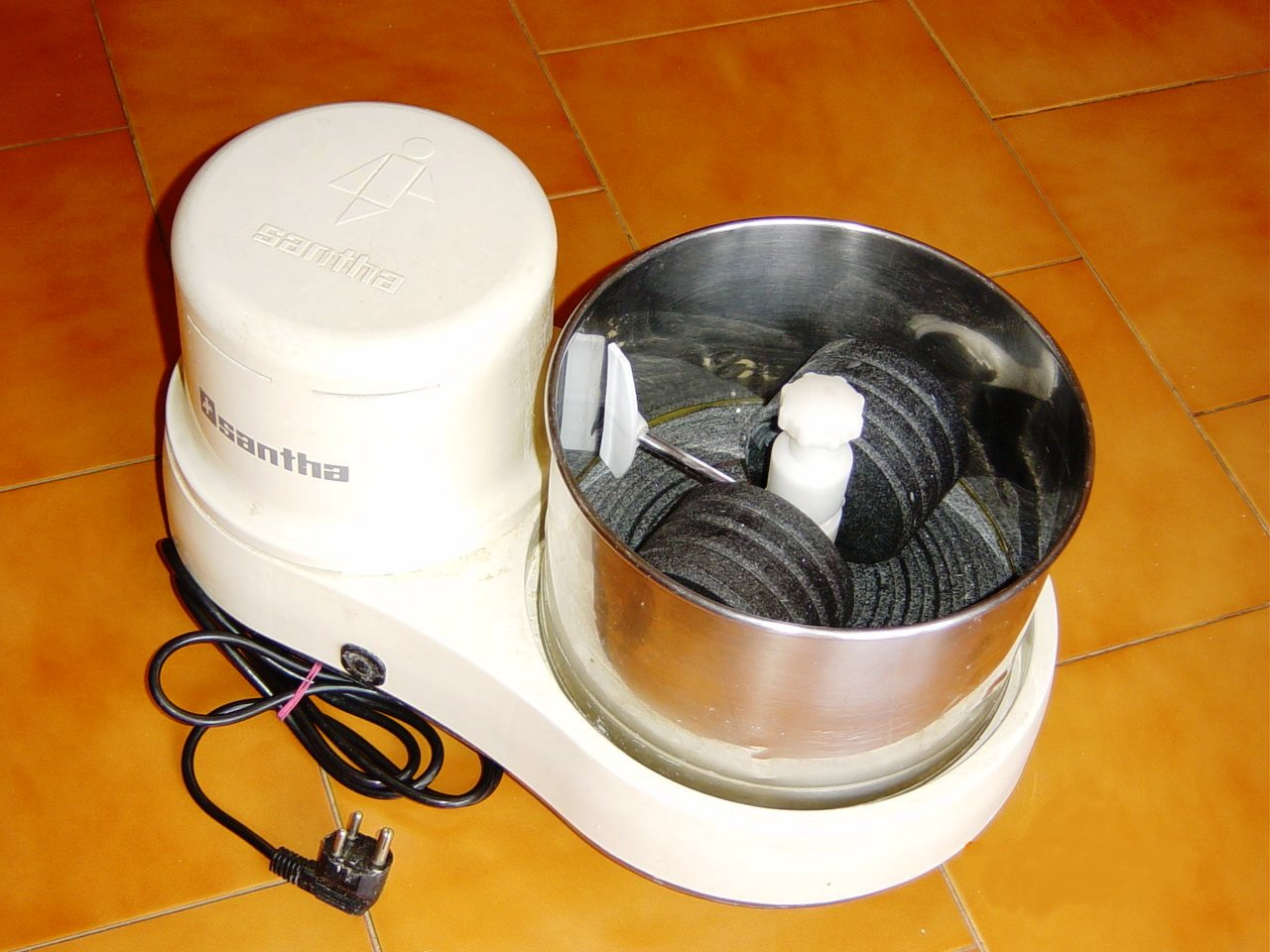
- Coimbatore Wet Grinder
- Description: wet grinders manufactured in Coimbatore
- Type: Manufactured
- Area: Coimbatore, Tamil Nadu
- Country: India
- Registered: 2005–06
- Material: granite, steel, electric motor

Coimbatore Wet Grinder refers to wet grinders manufactured in Coimbatore, Tamil Nadu. It has been recognized as a Geographical indication by the Government of India in 2005–06. As of 2015, Coimbatore has more than 700 wet grinder manufacturers with a monthly output 75,000 units per every 100,000 produced in India.

== Wet Grinder ==
A wet grinder is a food preparation appliance used for grinding food grains to produce batter. Batter is used extensively in South Indian cuisine for preparation of popular dishes such as dosa, idly, vada, appam and paniyaram. It consists of granite stones which rotate inside a metal drum with the help of an electric motor and the food grains get crushed between the stone and drum.

== History ==
P. Sabapathy developed the wet grinder in Coimbatore in 1955. Sabapathy introduced the grinders to other cities such as Chennai and Madurai. In 1963, P. B. Krishnamurthy started Lakshmi Grinders which led to the commercial popularity of wet grinders. In 1975, R. Doraiswamy invented the tilting wet grinders. L. G. Varadaraj introduced the table top wet grinders which replaced grinders which had to be placed on the ground.

== Industry ==
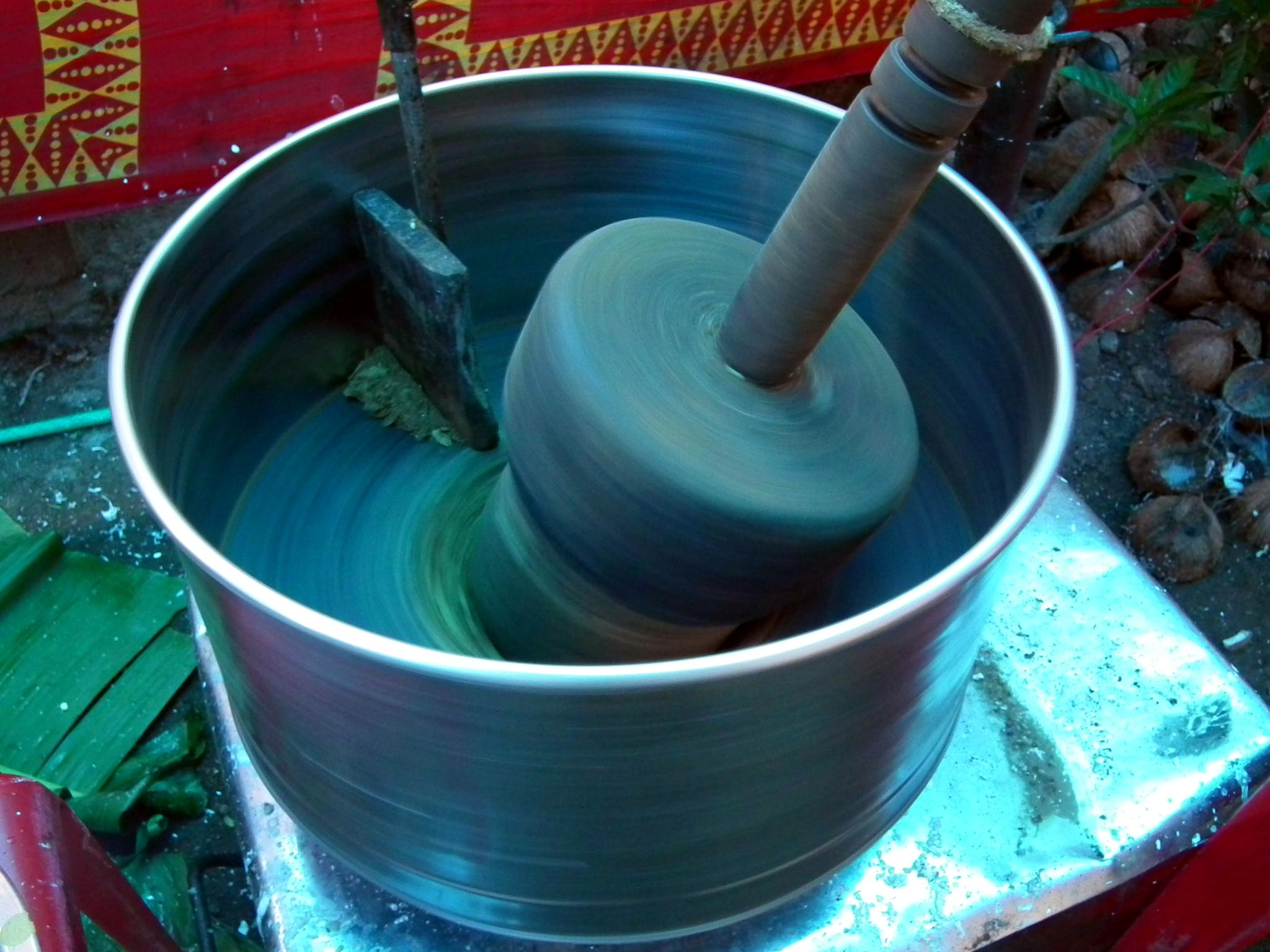
Earlier wet grinders

As the product was invented in the city, Coimbatore naturally emerged as a center for the manufacture of wet grinders. The availability of raw material in the form of granite stones, electric motor manufacturing units and the necessary heavy equipment such as lathes, drilling and milling machines used in manufacturing aided the development of the industry.

The city contributes to about 75% of the 1 lakh total monthly output of wet grinders in India. The industry employs 20,000 people directly and provides indirect employment to 50,000. In 2011, the cluster had a yearly turnover of ₹225 crore (US$23 million) which grew to ₹2,800 crore (US$290 million) in 2015.

== Recent developments ==
In 2007, the Government of Tamil Nadu opened a center for manufacturing raw materials for wet grinders and a research center built at a cost of ₹28.8 million (US$300,000). The industry grew over ten times in the last few years due to procurement of nearly 22.5 million wet grinders by the Government of Tamil Nadu for free distribution to green family card holders. In 2015, the Government of Puducherry announced distribution of free wet grinders to 3.37 lakh families for which it plans to procure wet grinders at a cost of ₹120 crore (US$12 million).

Wet grinders are mainly sold through retail channels with the manufacturer distributing it through intermediaries. Since 2014, the sales through e-commerce channel has grown considerably helping in bulk sales and brand building.

== Geographical Indication ==
In 2005, the Government of Tamil Nadu applied for Geographical Indication for Coimbatore wet grinder. The Government of India recognized it as a Geographical indication officially since the year 2005–06.
