= Thudiyalur =

- Neighbourhood
- Location in Tamil Nadu, India
- Coordinates: 11.080073°N 76.941590°E
- Country: India
- State: Tamil Nadu
- District: Coimbatore

Area
  - Total: 8.7 km^{2} (3.4 sq mi)

Population (2011)
  - Total: 33,924
  - Density: 3,900/km^{2} (10,000/sq mi)

Languages
  - Official: Tamil
- Time zone: UTC+5:30 (IST)

Thudiyalur is a neighborhood of Coimbatore in the Indian state of Tamil Nadu. Located in the western part of the state, it is part of Coimbatore North taluk in Coimbatore district. It was a panchayat town till 2011, when it was integrated into the Coimbatore Corporation. Spread across an area of 8.7 km^{2} (3.4 sq mi), it had a population of 33,924 individuals as per the 2011 census.

== Geography and administration ==
Thudiyalur is located in Coimbatore North taluk of Coimbatore district in the Indian state of Tamil Nadu. It is a neighbourhood of Coimbatore, and was a panchayat town till 2011, when it was absorbed into the Coimbatore Corporation. Spread across an area of 8.7 km^{2} (3.4 sq mi), it is located in the western part of the state. The region is served by Thudiyalur railway station, which is part of the Southern Railway zone of the Indian Railways. The region has a tropical climate with hot summers and mild winters. The highest temperatures are recorded in April and May, with lowest recordings in December-January.

The region is sub-divided into wards, which are represented by councillors, who sit in the corporation council. The town forms part of the Kavundampalayam Assembly constituency that elects its member to the Tamil Nadu legislative assembly and the Coimbatore Lok Sabha constituency that elects its member to the Parliament of India.

== Demographics ==
As per the 2011 census, Thudiyalur had a population of 33,924 individuals across 9,223 households. The population saw a marginal increase compared to the previous census in 2001 when 21,004 inhabitants were registered. The population consisted of 17,109 males and 16,815 females. About 3,306 individuals were below the age of six years. About 11.4% of the population belonged to scheduled castes. The entire population is classified as urban. The town has an average literacy rate of 91.4%.

About 42.3% of the eligible population were employed. Hinduism was the majority religion which was followed by 89.5% of the population, with Christianity (7.3%) and Islam (2.9%) being minor religions.

== Thudiyalur Railway Station ==
Thudiyalur railway station is a suburban railway station of Coimbatore. It is a station in between Coimbatore Junction and Mettupalayam. Thudiyalur railway station is just 800 meter from Thudiyalur bus stand on Mettupalayam road.

== Hospitals ==
- Government Urban Primary Health Centre, Thudiyalur
- ESIC Dispensaries-Viswanathanpuram
- Bhagirathi hospital
- V.G Hospital
- Hem Hospital
- Sri Lakshmi medical Centre and Hospital
- Shivani Medical Centre
- Umadevi Hospital
- Sai Hospital
