= Mettupalayam railway station =

Railway station in Tamil Nadu, India

Mettupalayam junction

General information
- Location: Mettupalayam, Coimbatore; Tamil Nadu, India
- Coordinates: 11.2989°N 76.9355°E
- System: Indian Railways station
- Owner: Indian Railways
- Lines: Coimbatore–Mettupalayam line Nilgiri Mountain Railway
- Platforms: 3 Side platforms
- Tracks: 3 electrified broad gauge, 1 metre gauge

Construction
- Parking: Available
- Cycle facilities: Yes

Other information
- Status: Functioning
- Station code: MTP
- Zone(s): Southern Railway zone
- Division(s): Salem
- Fare zone: Southern Railway zone

History
- Opened: 1873; 153 years ago
- Closed: 1903
- Rebuilt: 1973
- Electrified: Yes (broad gauge only)

Passengers
- 1.55 crores

Services
5
Location
- Location within India Location within Tamil Nadu

Mettupalayam railway station (station code: MTP) is an NSG–4 category Indian railway station in Salem railway division of Southern Railway zone. It is a railway station located in Mettupalayam, a suburb of Coimbatore district in the Indian state Tamil Nadu. It is one of the important railway stations located in the Coimbatore District, because the Nilgiri Mountain Railway to the hill station of Ooty starts from here. It is the connection between the metre-gauge Nilgiri Mountain Railway and the broad-gauge main network of Indian Railways. It recently celebrated its 150th anniversary.

The Grand Trunk Express operated from Mettupalayam to Peshawar from 15 October 1929 and was extended to Lahore from 1 March 1930. Later that year, on 1 September 1930, it was changed to New Delhi to Chennai, which remains the case till today. The Tea Garden Express ran in metre gauge between Ooty and Mettupalayam and broad gauge between Mettupalayam and Cochin Harbour Terminus. Post-Indian independence, the Ooty–Mettupalayam trip was cut off, and the train ran as No. 565/566 between Cochin Harbour Terminus and Mettupalayam since the 1970s. Today the Nilgiri Express (also known as the Blue Mountain Express) covers Chennai to Mettupalayam and acts as the link to Ooty. Nilgiri Express used to be the main portion of Bangalore Mail, Island Express, Malabar Express and Mumbai–Coimbatore (through coach bifurcate/amalgamate to Chennai–Mumbai Mail).

The Mettupalayam junction to Ooty passenger train (56136) only departs from Mettupalayam after the arrival of Nilgiri Express (12671) at Mettupalayam.

== Projects and development ==
It is one of the 73 stations in Tamil Nadu to be named for upgradation under Amrit Bharat Station Scheme of Indian Railways.

== Awards and achievements ==
In 2019, the station was granted ISO–14001 certification for complying with National Green Tribunal (NGT) directives.

== See also ==
- Coimbatore Junction
- Nilgiri Mountain Railway
