= Periyanaickenpalayam railway station =

Railway station in Tamil Nadu, India

Periyanaickenpalayan
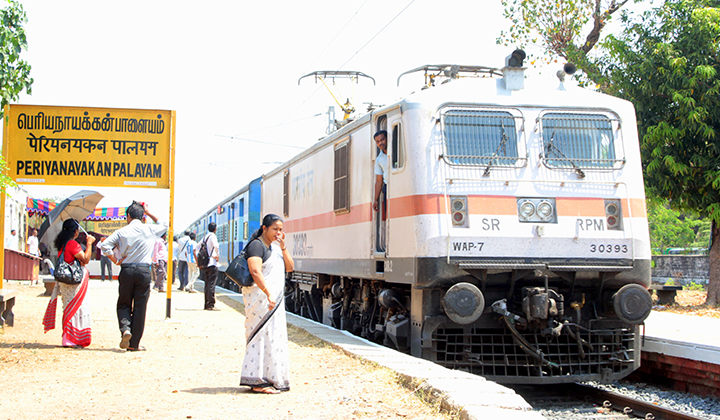

General information
- Location: Sri Ramakrishna Mission Vidyalaya, Periyanaickenpalayam, Coimbatore, Tamil Nadu
- Coordinates: 11.145435°N 76.948872°E
- Elevation: 340.71 metres (1,117.8 ft)
- Line: Coimbatore–Mettupalayam line
- Platforms: 1

Construction
- Parking: Available

Other information
- Status: Functional
- Station code: PKM
- Zone(s): Southern Railway zone
- Division(s): Salem
Route map
Location
- Location within Tamil Nadu

Periyanaickenpalayam Railway station (station code: PDKM) is an NSG–6 category Indian railway station in Salem railway division of Southern Railway zone. It is a suburban railway station in Coimbatore.

== History ==
The station is one of the oldest in the state, built in 1873. It was renovated in 2016/2017 at a cost of ₹ 2 crore under the Corporate Social Responsibility (CSR) of Laksmi Machine Works (LMW). Having been in existence for more than 140 years, the station played a significant role in the development of the locality. Currently, on average more than 1,000 passengers make use of this station to travel between Coimbatore and Mettupalayam on daily basis. Being located close to Lakshmi Machine Works it is frequently used by the company employees. The station was last renovated in 1986 and the number of train services was gradually increased in the years that followed. LMW under its CSR initiative has taken up the renovation work of the Periyanaickenpalayam Railway Station in 2016 and was completed in June 2017. The renovation includes construction of the station building with facilities such as waiting area, ramps, separate disabled friendly toilets, ticket counter-cum-station master room, fencing of the station area and gardening. As a part of LMW's environment greening initiative, 135 native tree sapling varieties have been planted on the station premises and also in the surrounding areas to increase the green cover and ambiance of the station.
