= Mettur Dam railway station =

Railway station in Tamil Nadu, India

Mettur Dam

General information
- Location: SH 20, P.N.Patti, Tamil Nadu, India
- Coordinates: 11°48′16.6″N 77°49′23.8″E
- Elevation: 256 metres (840 ft)
- System: Indian Railways station
- Owner: Indian Railways
- Line: Salem Junction–Mettur Dam line
- Platforms: 1
- Tracks: 1

Construction
- Structure type: On ground

Other information
- Status: Active
- Station code: MTDM
- Zone(s): Southern Railway zone
- Division(s): Salem
- Fare zone: Southern Railway zone
Location

Mettur Dam railway station (station code: MTDM) is an NSG–6 category Indian railway station in Salem railway division of Southern Railway zone. It is a railway station situated in Mettur, Salem district in the Indian state of Tamil Nadu. The station is end station on the Salem Junction–Mettur Dam line. As of 2025, only one passenger train is operated to Mettur dam is from Erode Junction via Salem Junction because unlike other sections of Southern Railway, this small corridor is heavily concentrated on freight traffic.
