= Omalur Junction railway station =

Railway station in Tamil Nadu, India

Omalur Junction
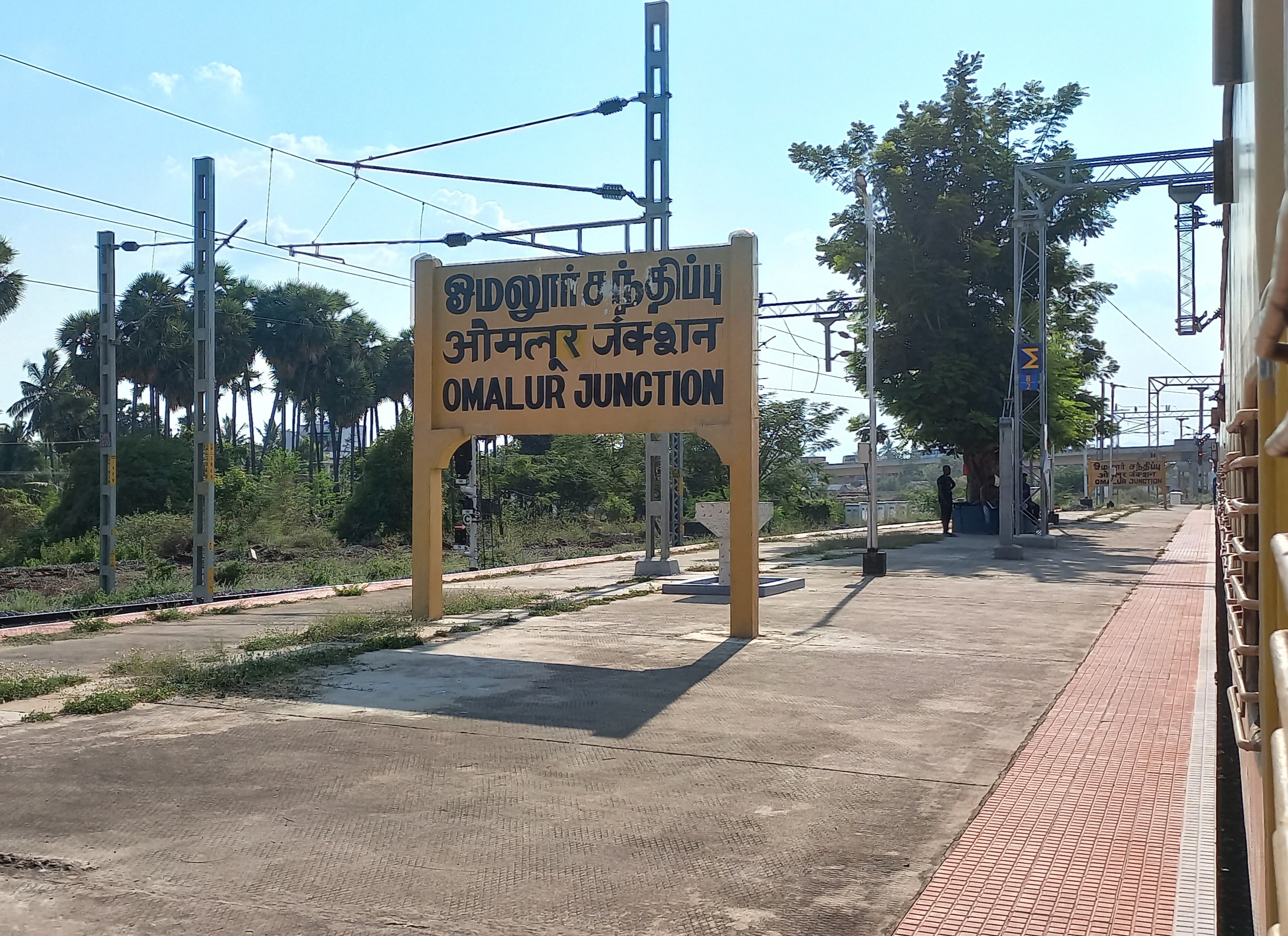

General information
- Location: State Highway 86, Omalur, Salem district, Tamil Nadu; India
- Coordinates: 11.7383°N 78.0452°E
- Elevation: 278 metres (912 ft)
- System: Indian Railways station
- Owner: Indian Railways
- Operator: Southern Railway zone
- Lines: Salem–Bengaluru line, Salem- Mettur Dam
- Platforms: 2
- Connections: Auto rickshaw, Taxi, Bus

Construction
- Structure type: Standard (on-ground station)
- Parking: Yes
- Accessible: Yes

Other information
- Status: Functioning
- Station code: OML
- Zone(s): Southern Railway zone
- Division(s): Salem
- Fare zone: Indian Railways
Location

Omalur Junction railway station (station code: OML) is an NSG–6 category Indian railway station in Salem railway division of Southern Railway zone. It is a railway junction serves Omalur and its surrounding areas in Salem, Tamil Nadu. This railway junction also serves as a satellite station for Salem Junction. All the trains halting/passing via Salem Junction from Bengaluru and Mettur stop at Omalur Junction. This station lies on the junction of lines to Bengaluru via Dharmapuri and Hosur and Mettur.

The station has six tracks and two platforms that are mainly for the trains that are waiting to enter Salem Junction. Omalur junction is one of the nearest railway stations to Salem Airport. Now the station has been extending with 15 crores of large station building and 3rd platform with island platform.

== Location and layout ==
The station has two platforms. The third platform with a subway is under construction it will be finished within two months.

The station is at the junction of two lines:

1. Salem–Bengaluru section
2. Salem–Mettur Dam spur line via Omalur it is electrified and doubling track between Omalur to Mettur.
