= Coimbatore North Junction railway station =

Railway station in Tamil Nadu, India

Coimbatore North
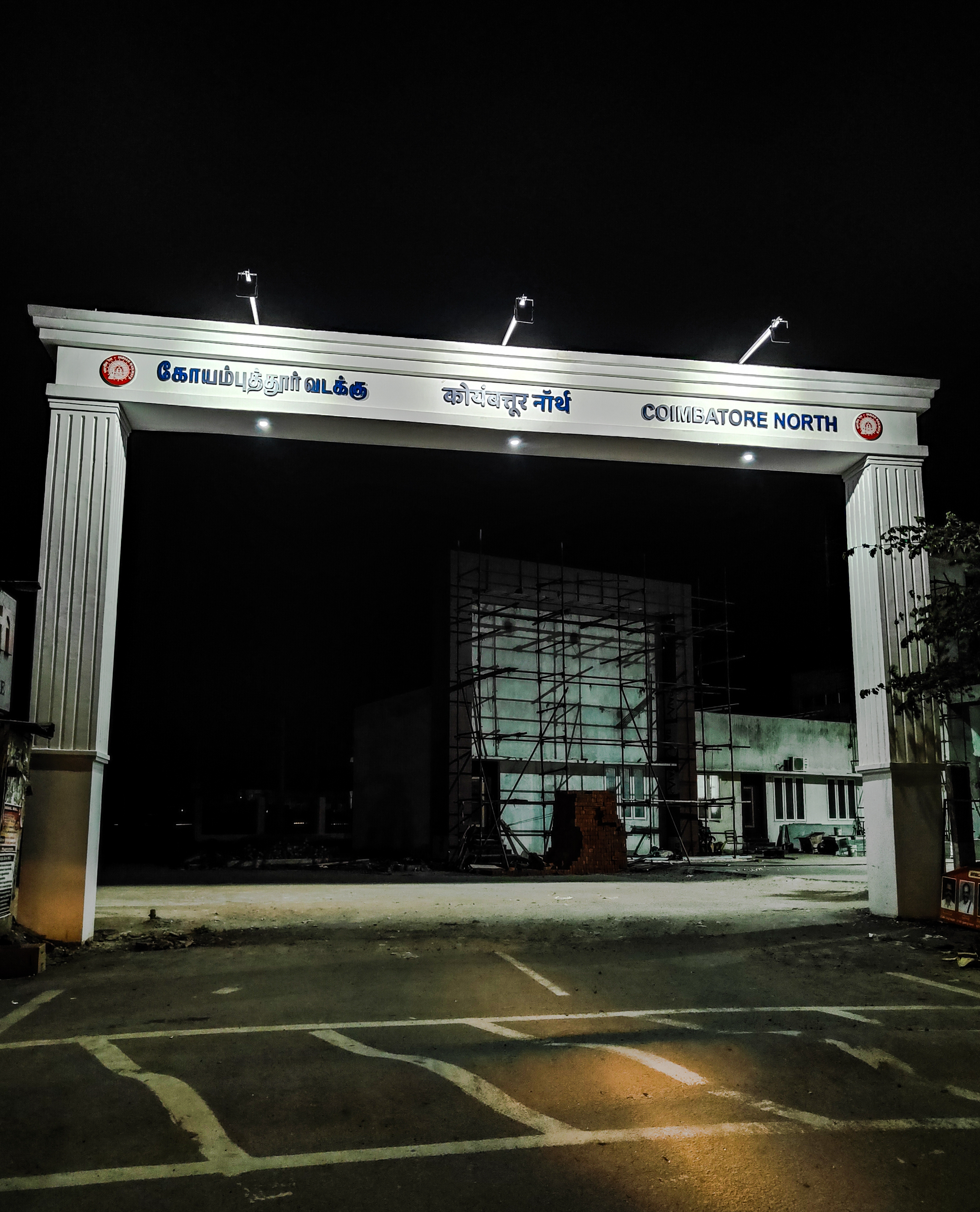

General information
- Location: Sivananda colony, Tatabad Coimbatore, Tamil Nadu
- Coordinates: 11.020162°N 76.954641°E
- Elevation: 433 metres (1,421 ft)
- System: Express train, Passenger train and Commuter rail station
- Lines: Chennai–Coimbatore line Coimbatore–Mettupalayam branch line
- Platforms: 2

Construction
- Parking: Available
- Cycle facilities: Yes

Other information
- Status: Functional
- Station code: CBF
- Zone(s): Southern Railway zone
- Division(s): Salem
Location
- Location within Tamil Nadu

Coimbatore North (station code: CBF) is an NSG–6 category Indian railway station in Salem railway division of Southern Railway zone. It is also known as Vadakovai, located in Coimbatore of the Indian state of Tamil Nadu. The railway line to Mettupalayam and onwards to Ooty branches off from here. The number of trains passing through the Coimbatore North railway station is 29. This station acts as major and nearest station for people live in Vadavalli, Koundapalayam, Thudiyalur and Anaikatti which suburbs of Coimbatore.

== Projects and development ==
It is one of the 73 stations in Tamil Nadu to be named for upgradation under Amrit Bharat Station Scheme of Indian Railways. An additional platform is planned to be built at the station to utilise the station as a major halt and provide MEMU services to Coimbatore city.

== See also ==
- Coimbatore Junction
- Transport in Coimbatore
