= Coimbatore Junction railway station =

Railway Junction in Coimbatore, India

Coimbatore Junction Kovai Junction
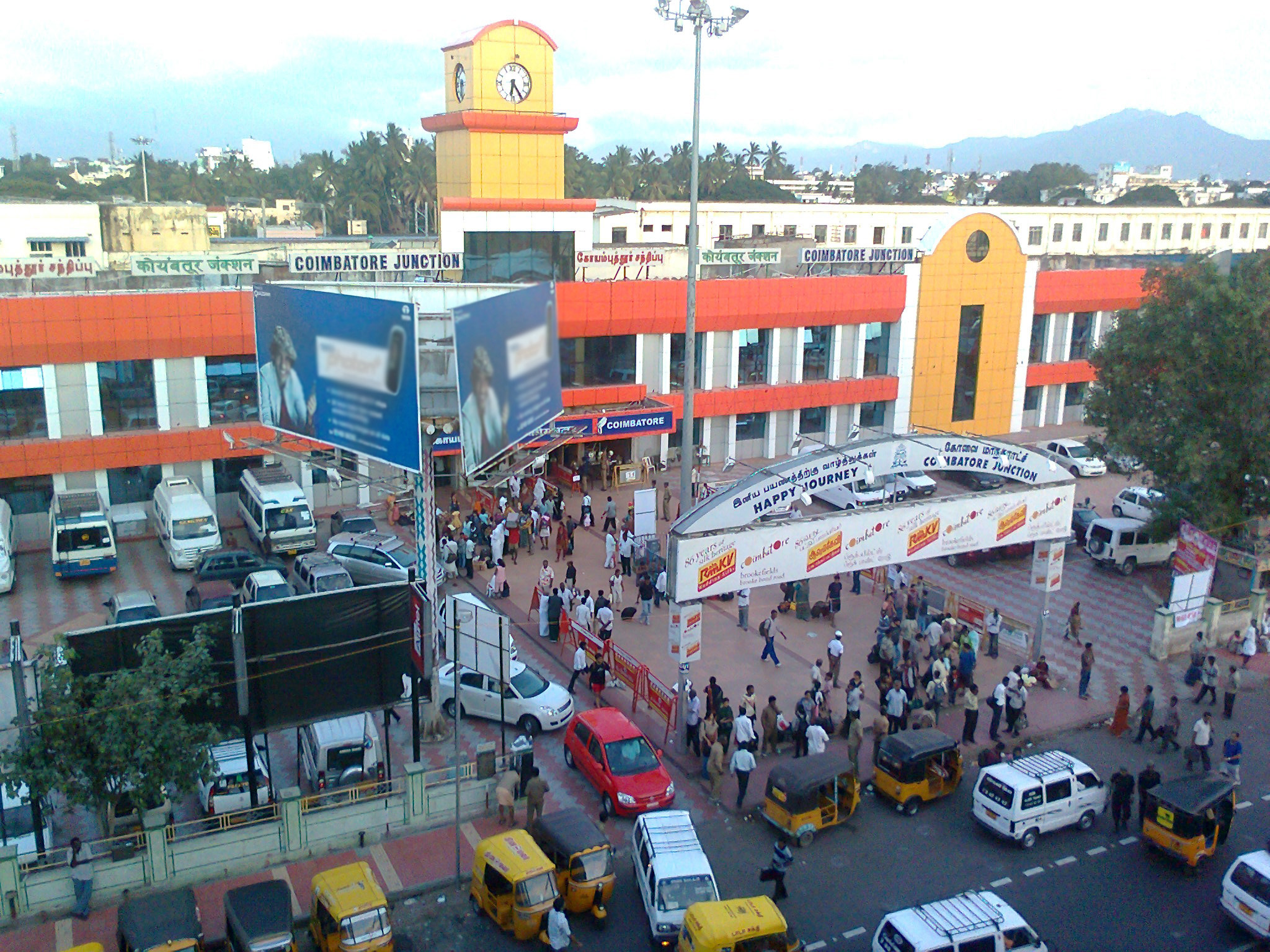
- Main entrance of the station

General information
- Other names: Coimbatore City Junction; Coimbatore Main Junction
- Location: State Bank Road, Coimbatore, Tamil Nadu – 641018
- Coordinates: 10.996365°N 76.967222°E
- Elevation: 411.4 metres (1,350 ft)
- System: rail station
- Owner: Indian Railways
- Operator: Southern Railway zone
- Lines: Chennai–Coimbatore; Coimbatore–Shoranur; Coimbatore–Mettupalayam; Coimbatore–Pollachi
- Platforms: 6 side platforms
- Tracks: 15

Construction
- Parking: Available
- Accessible: Yes

Other information
- Status: Functional
- Station code: CBE
- Zone(s): Southern Railway zone
- Division(s): Salem

History
- Opened: 1873; 153 years ago
- Former names: Coimbatore Central
Location
- Location within Tamil Nadu
- Interactive map

Coimbatore Junction railway station (station code: CBE) is a railway station located in Coimbatore in the Indian state of Tamil Nadu. It is the major rail-head in the city and comes under the jurisdiction of Salem railway division of Southern Railway zone. It is one of the busiest and highest revenue generating stations in India. The station lies on the Jolarpettai–Shoranur main line and has six side platforms.

== History ==
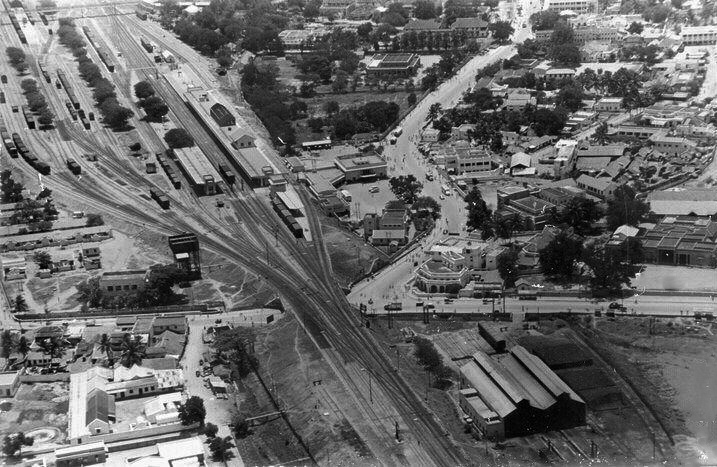
Aerial view of Coimbatore Junction in 1930s

Train service in Coimbatore started with the opening of railway station at Podanur in 1862 as a part of the Podanur–Madras line connecting the west coast with the rest of India. Coimbatore junction became operational on 1 February 1873 after the construction of a branch line connecting Podanur. It was started as a halt station for the Coimbatore–Mettupalayam branch line. Until 1956, the Coimbatore Railway Division was functioning with Podanur as the headquarters before the headquarters was shifted to Olavakkode which became Palakkad railway division. The station became part of the newly formed Salem railway division in 2006. Coimbatore is among the top hundred booking stations of Indian Railways. As of 2023, it contributes to nearly 45% of the revenues of the Salem railway division and is classified as a NSG-2 station (annual revenue between 100 and 5 billion rupees and 10–20 million passengers handled).

== Network and infrastructure ==
The station lies on the Jolarpettai–Shoranur 5 ft 6 in (1,676 mm) broad gauge main line with other lines branching out from Coimbatore North and Podanur junctions. The station is connected with following railway lines:

- Jolarpettai–Shoranur
  - Chennai–Coimbatore
  - Coimbatore–Shoranur
- Coimbatore–Pollachi
- Coimbatore–Mettupalayam

The station has six platforms and handles about 165 trains daily. It is one of the 73 stations in Tamil Nadu to be named for upgradation under Amrit Bharat Station Scheme of Indian Railways.

== See also ==
- Railway stations in Coimbatore
- Coimbatore Metro
- Transport in Coimbatore
