= Salem Junction railway station =

Railway junction in Salem, India

Salem Junction Salem Sandhippu
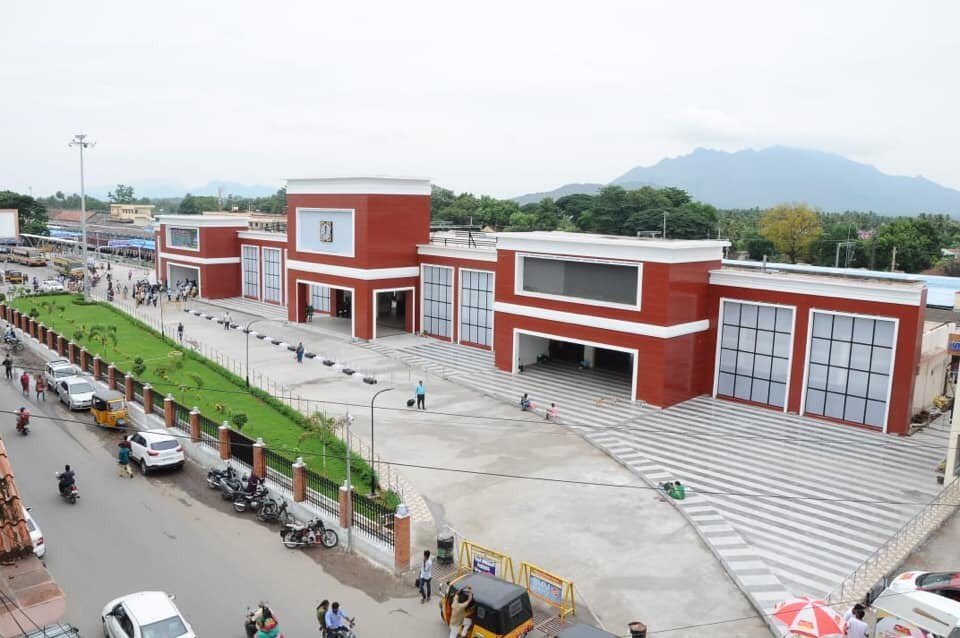
- New renovated entrance of Salem Junction

General information
- Location: Junction Main road, Suramanagalam, Salem, Tamil Nadu, India
- Coordinates: 11°40′17.05″N 78°6′47.6″E
- Elevation: 288 metres (945 ft)
- System: Indian Railways station
- Owner: Indian Railways
- Lines: Jolarpettai–Shoranur line Salem–Karur line Salem-Vriddhachalam; Salem–dharmapuri-Bengaluru, Mettur dam
- Platforms: 6
- Tracks: 8
- Connections: Goods terminal, Taxi Stand, Satellite Town Bus Terminal

Construction
- Structure type: on ground station
- Parking: Available
- Cycle facilities: Available
- Accessible: Disabled access

Other information
- Status: Active
- Station code: SA
- Zone(s): Southern Railway
- Division(s): Salem railway division

Passengers
- 50,000 per day on average
Location
- Interactive map

Salem Junction railway station (station code: SA) is an NSG–2 category Indian railway station in Salem railway division of Southern Railway zone. It serves the city of Salem in Tamil Nadu. It is one of the major transit points in Southern India.

== History ==
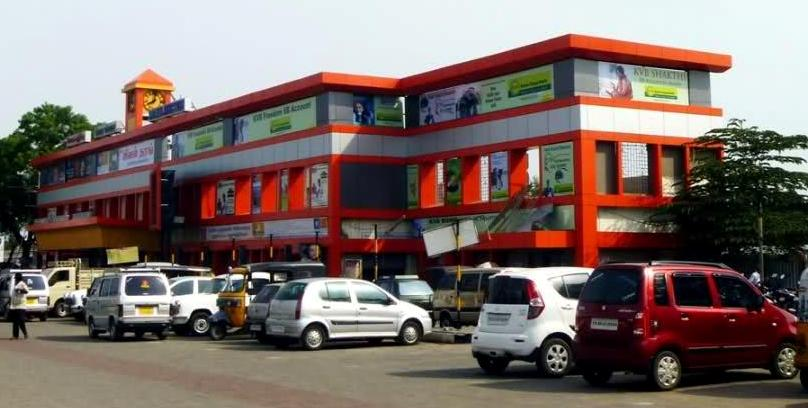
Salem Junction's entrance before renovation

The station came into existence as part of the Chennai (then Madras)–Beypore (present-day Kerala) rail line in the 1860s. The station gained its junction status when the metre-gauge line was laid to Vridachalam, providing a connection to the South Indian railway network. After independence, the abandoned narrow-gauge line of Dharmapuri–Morappur was re-built and alignment changed to terminate the line at Salem Junction instead of Morappur. It was upgraded to metre gauge simultaneously. Salem to Bangalore via Hosur 124-mile-long railway line survey was sanctioned on 25 July 1955 and field work started on 27 February 1956. In the 1990s, this railway line was converted to broad gauge. In the 2000s, the Vriddachalam line was also converted to broad gauge, making the station a complete broad-gauge station. The long-pending new broad-gauge railway line to Karur, started in the late 1990s, was commissioned in 2013. This paved way for a shorter, more direct route to southern districts of Tamil Nadu from Salem. This new direct route (from Karur jn to Salem jn line) leads to diversion of many trains from Southern Tamil Nadu to Bangalore and Katpadi route via Namakkal.

== Connectivity and infrastructure ==
Salem Junction has 24-hour continuous (Bus No:13) bus service to Town Bus Station (Old Bus Stand) and Central Bus Stand (New Bus Stand). The nearest airport is Salem Airport, which is 18 km (11 mi) away from the station. 24-hour taxi service from the railway station is available. There are originating passenger trains in all junction lines. It is an upgraded A–grade station. The station has a subway for every platform and platform bridges with escalators. The station has six platforms and eight tracks.

== Facilities ==
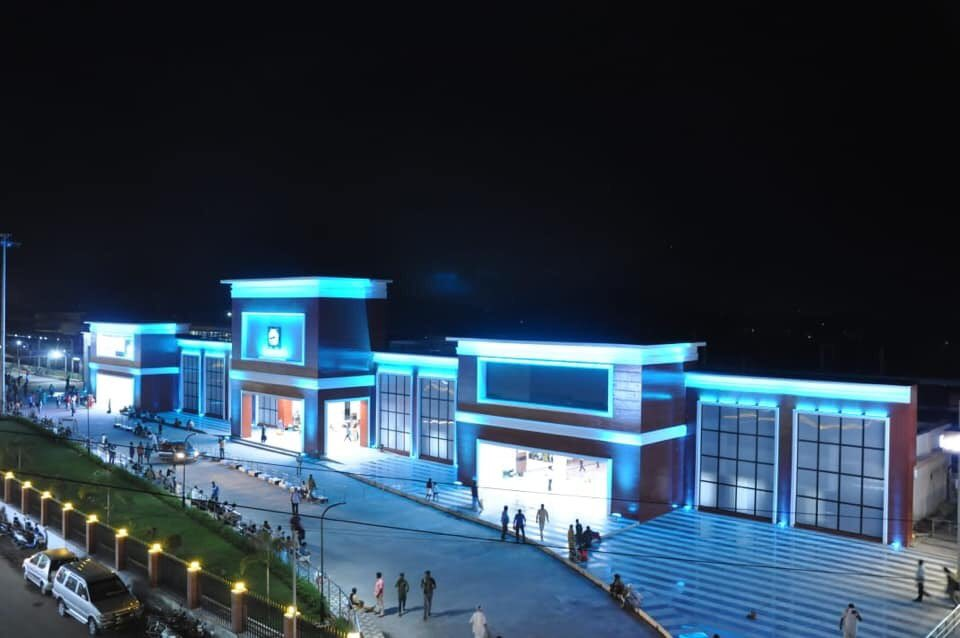
Salem Junction at night

The AC Waiting Hall at 1st, 3rd, and 4th Platforms with toilet facilities cost Rs:20/hr. The second entrance with ticket counter at Old Suramangalam Road is planning to construct with subway and footover. Platforms 1, 3 and 4 are operated with 24-hour lifts and escalators.

It has IRCTC Railway Canteen Platform No:3&4. Anandha Bhavan and Ashok Bhavan are nearby restaurants, and Hotel Ashwa Park, Raddison, Sivaraj Holiday Inn, and CJ Plazzio are nearby hotels.

The Salem Railway Division introduced battery operated car service on a payment basis at the Salem Railway Junction, available on platform numbers 3 and 4. The service is meant mainly for senior citizens, disabled people, and ailing persons.

On 26 December 2017, Salem Junction got free Wi-Fi connectivity. The facility is being provided by RailTel, a public sector telecom infrastructure provider.

== Projects and development ==
It is one of the 73 stations in Tamil Nadu to be named for upgradation under Amrit Bharat Station Scheme of Indian Railways.

== Awards and achievements ==
In 2019, the station was granted ISO–14001 certification for complying with NGT (nation Green Tribunal). The station has been rated as the cleanest station among the divisional headquarters railway stations and also the ninth cleanest railway station in the entire country, according to a survey report published in June 2017.

== Lines ==
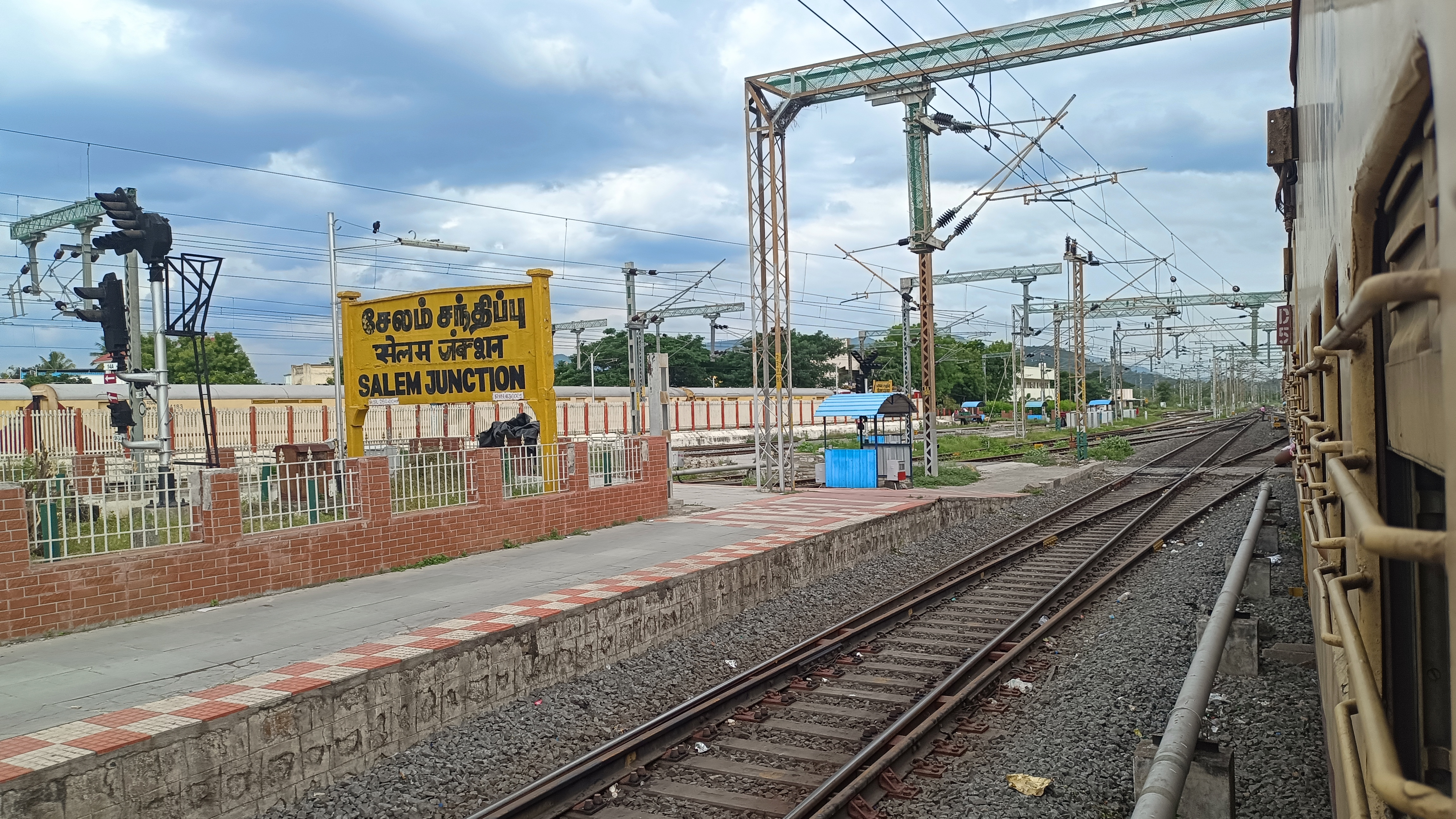
Salem Junction Railway station nameboard

There are Five lines branching out from the station:

- Double Electrified BG line towards Chennai Central
- Double Electrified BG line towards Coimbatore Junction
- Double Electrified BG line towards Magnesite, Omalur & Singular Line to Bengaluru City Via Dharmapuri (doubling and electrification Proposed from Omalur to Dharmapuri)
- Single electric BG line towards Cuddalore Port Junction
- Single Electrified BG line towards Karur Junction(doubling and electrification Proposed)
