= Salem railway division =

Railway division of India

Salem Railway Division
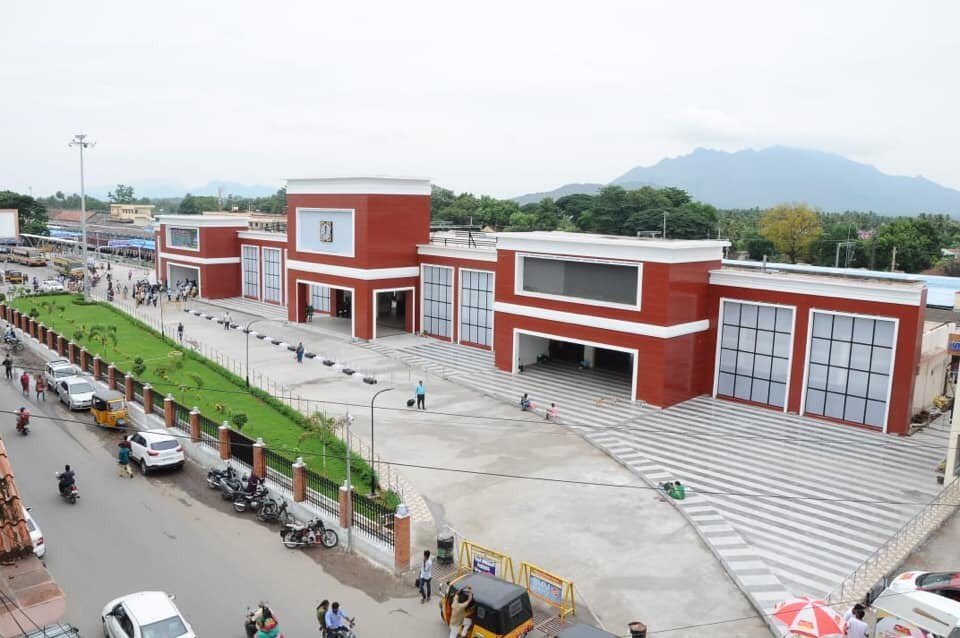
- Salem Junction railway station, Headquarters Salem railway division

Overview
- Headquarters: Salem
- Locale: Tamil Nadu, India
- Dates of operation: 14 November 2006–
- Predecessor: Southern Railways

Technical
- Track gauge: 5 ft 6 in (1,676 mm) broad gauge
- Previous gauge: Broad gauge and Meter gauge
- Length: 862 km (536 mi)

Other
- Website: Southern Railways - Salem railway division

Salem railway division is one of the six railway divisions under the jurisdiction of Southern Railway zone of the Indian Railways. Its headquarters is at Salem, Tamil Nadu.

== History ==
Salem Railway Division is the newest division of the Southern Railway Zone of Indian Railways. It was carved out of the Palakkad railway division and Tiruchirappalli railway division. It was inaugurated on 14 November 2006 in the presence of Arjun Singh and the then chief minister of Tamil Nadu, M. Karunanidhi.

== Important railway stations ==
Coimbatore junction is the busiest railway station in this division and accounts for 45% of the revenues. Coimbatore junction is classified under NSG-2 and it has 35,000 footfall per day. Salem, Erode and Karur are the other important junctions, while Erode handles most of the crew change in the route. Tiruppur is an important station in Salem division that handles a significant volume of agricultural commodities, textile products and machinery, which contribute an abundant profit in the freight segment.

== Routes ==
Salem division has its jurisdiction entirely in the state of Tamil Nadu. It covers 15 districts in Tamil Nadu and has a total route length of 862 km (536 mi), Coimbatore, Tiruppur, Erode, Salem, Karur and Namakkal being the important district Headquarters.

Salem division jurisdiction includes the following:

- Tiruppattur to Irugur
- Irugur to Podanur
- Irugur to Coimbatore North Junction
- Mettupalayam to Podanur Junction
- Magnesite Junction to Mettur Dam
- Mettupalayam to Ooty (Meter Gauge)
- Erode to Tiruchirappalli Fort (Excluded)
- Salem to Dindigul (Excluded)
- Salem to Virudhachalam (Excluded)

== Loco Shed ==
There is a Diesel as well as an Electric Loco shed in Erode. Both the loco sheds provide locomotives to Southern Railways, Konkan Railways, South Western Railways and South Central Railways.

One Meter Gauge loco shed is situated at Coonoor to facilitate Nilgiri Mountain Railway.

- Diesel Locomotive Shed, Erode has been assessed as the best Diesel Loco shed in Southern Railway Zone during the tenure of 2005–2006 and 2009–2010. The shed has been internationally certified with ISO 9001:2000 for Quality Management System in March 2004 and ISO 14001:2004 for Environmental Management System in September 2004 for its standards. A diesel loco belonging to shed was awarded "Black Beauty Queen", during the inaugural annual best loco competition among Southern Railway zone outmatching other sheds viz., Tondiarpet, Ernakulam and Golden Rock, as about 15 parameters were considered for the selection. It has one of the largest fleet of WDM-3D, WDG-3A and WDM-3A. Around 2014, Erode Diesel shed started to receive the High horse power EMD locomotives apart from the conventional Alco locomotives. WDG-4 was initial HHP loco allotted and WDP4D variants were allocated later on. Around 2019, it started to home the WAG variant electric locos which are for freight operations and in 2020, it received WAP-1 locomotive transferred from Electric Loco Shed, Arakkonam. Apart from the Mainline service locomotives, plenty of shunting locomotives are maintained as well. Now Erode Diesel Locomotive shed houses WAP4, WAG5 and WAG7.
- Electric Locomotive Shed, Erode is one of the premier sheds in Indian Railways, it was having the largest fleet of WAP-4 till 2017, eventually few were transferred to Electric Loco Shed, Arakkonam. In October 2017, Erode received first two 3-phase AC locos of the class WAP-7 from Electric Loco Shed, Royapuram. In July 2020, Erode was allocated with four WAG-9 locomotives, making it the first shed in Southern Railway zone to home WAG-9 locomotive.
- The Meter gauge loco shed at Coonoor is the place where the steam and diesel locomotives for Nilgiri Mountain Railway are serviced, maintained and fueled for their trips. Coal-fired or Oil-fired X-Class Rack-and-Pinion steam engines are homed here along with YDM-4 class.

== Pit lines ==
The pit lines for maintenance of passenger coaches are at Coimbatore, Erode, Mettupalayam and Coonoor.

- Coimbatore has two pit lines, both can handle 24 coach trains.
- Erode has two pit lines, one can handle 17 coaches and other can handle ten coaches. An additional pitline for handling long-distance trains is nearing completion.
- Mettupalayam has three pit lines: Two broad-gauge pit lines and one meter-gauge. The lone meter-gauge pit line is capable of handling four coaches. Among the two broad-gauge pit lines, one can handle seven coaches and other pit line has the capacity of six coaches.
- Coonoor has one meter-gauge pit line which can handle four coaches.

== Trains handled ==
Salem division handles many long-distance and interstate trains. Coimbatore coaching complex is the most important in Salem division and it is congested due to the huge volume of trains.

- Cheran Superfast Express, Chemmozhi Express, Intercity Express, Tirupati Express, Uday Express, Thiruvananthapuram Mail, Mayiladuthurai Jan Shatabdi Express, Nagercoil Express, Vande Bharat Express are maintained at Coimbatore coaching depot. Apart from this Coimbatore Jaipur Express and Hisar Coimbatore Express belonging to North Western Railway gets their secondary maintenance.
- Erode Coaching depot maintains Yercaud Express and Chennai–Charlapalli Superfast Express, Erode–Jogbani Amrit Bharat Express. Besides these two express trains, few more passenger trains like Erode - Jolarpettai, Mettur Dam, Tiruchchirappalli, Sengottai are handled at Erode.
- Toy trains plying in Nilgiri Mountain Railway are maintained at Coonoor and Mettupalayam.

== Tourism ==
The famous Nilgiri Mountain Railway heritage line is under Salem division. The scenic line starts from Mettupalayam and ends at Ooty. The section from Mettupalayam to Coonoor is hauled by a Steam locomotive. A YDM-4 Diesel engine is attached at Coonoor for the further journey till Ooty. Between Mettupalayam and Coonoor, the line uses the Abt rack and pinion system to climb the steep gradient. The NMR is the only rack railway in India. The average gradient in this rack section is 1 in 24.5 (4.08%), with a maximum of 1 in 12 (8.33%). Even though the NMR supplies networked computerized ticketing systems for onward journeys, it still issues Edmondson style manual tickets for the Udhagamandalam-Mettupalayam journey to preserve its 'World Heritage Site' status. Ticket booking is similar to conventional trains and can be done via the Indian Railway website. It is advisable to book tickets well in advance, especially during peak season.

== Medical facilities ==
The medical department comprises two sub Divisional hospitals – Erode and Podanur. It also four Health Units at Coonoor, Mettupalayam, Salem and Karur. At present proposals have gone to Railway Board for approval of a multi specialty sub divisional hospital at Erode.

== Projects and development ==
It is one of the 73 stations in Tamil Nadu to be named for upgradation under Amrit Bharat Station Scheme of Indian Railways.

45 crore rupees have been allocated for the renovation work of Salem railway station under the Amrit Bharat scheme.

== Facts ==
- Southern Railway's first Anaconda freight train was operated by Salem division from Erode Junction to Jolarpettai Junction.
- India's first Uday Express was inaugurated at Coimbatore.
- Salem division has its entire Broad Gauge line electrified.
- Chemmozhi express in Coimbatore coach care is completely maintained by women.
- It has the only hill railway tourist toy train present in entire South India.
