= Ernakulam–Velankanni Express (via Tiruchchirappalli) =

Train in India

Ernakulam - Velankanni Express

Overview
- Service type: Express
- Status: Active
- Locale: Kerala and Tamil Nadu
- First service: 18 March 2026; 6 months ago
- Current operator: Southern Railway (SR)

Route
- Termini: Ernakulam Junction (ERS); Velankanni (VLNK)
- Stops: 10
- Distance travelled: 703 km (437 mi)
- Average journey time: 17h 45m
- Service frequency: Weekly
- Train number: 16363 / 16364

On-board services
- Classes: General Unreserved, Sleeper Class, AC 3rd Class, AC 2nd Class
- Seating arrangements: Yes
- Sleeping arrangements: Yes
- Catering facilities: Pantry Car
- Observation facilities: Large windows
- Baggage facilities: No
- Other facilities: Below the seats

Technical
- Rolling stock: LHB coach
- Track gauge: 1,676 mm (5 ft 6 in)
- Electrification: 25 kV 50 Hz AC Overhead line
- Operating speed: 130 km/h (81 mph) maximum, 40 km/h (25 mph) average including halts.
- Track owner: Indian Railways

The 16363 / 16364 Ernakulam–Velankanni Express (via Tiruchchirappalli) is an express train belonging to Southern Railway zone that runs between the city Ernakulam Junction of Kerala and Velankanni of Tamil Nadu in India.

It operates as train number 16363 from Ernakulam Junction to Velankanni and as train number 16364 in the reverse direction, serving the states of Tamil Nadu and Kerala.

== Services ==
• 16363/ Ernakulam–Velankanni Express has an average speed of 40 km/h and covers 717 km in 17h 45m.

• 16364/ Velankanni–Ernakulam Express has an average speed of 44 km/h and covers 717 km in 16h 10m.

== Route and halts ==
The Important Halts of the train are :

- Ernakulam Junction
- Kollam Junction
- Punalur
- Sengottai
- Virudhunagar Junction
- Madurai Junction
- Dindigul Junction
- Tiruchchirappalli Junction
- Nagapattinam Junction
- Velankanni

== Schedule ==
• 16363 - 11:50 PM (Wednesday) [Ernakulam Junction]

• 16364 - 7:45 PM (Thursday) [Velankanni]

== Coach composition ==
1. General Unreserved - 4
2. Sleeper Class - 8
3. AC 3rd Class - 3
4. AC 2nd Class - 1

== Traction ==
As the entire route is fully electrified it is hauled by a Royapuram Shed-based WAP-7 electric locomotive from Ernakulam Junction to Velankanni and vice versa.

== Rake reversal or rake share ==
The train will reverse 2 time :

1. Kollam Junction
2. Nagapattinam Junction

The train will rake sharing with Ernakulam–Velankanni Express (16361/16362).

== See also ==
Trains from Ernakulam Junction:

1. Madgaon–Ernakulam Superfast Express
2. Marusagar Express
3. Ernakulam–H.Nizamuddin Duronto Express
4. Ernakulam–Patna Superfast Express (via Asansol)
5. Ernakulam–Okha Express

Trains from Velankanni:

1. Vasco da Gama–Velankanni Weekly Express
2. Palaruvi Express
3. Chennai Egmore–Velankanni Link Express
4. Ananthapuri Express

== Notes ==
a. Runs one day in a week with both directions.
