= Chennai Egmore–Velankanni Link Express =

Overview
- Service type: Express
- Locale: Tamilnadu & Pondicherry
- First service: 22 July 2013; 13 years ago
- Last service: 2020 March 31
- Current operator: Southern Railway zone

Route
- Termini: Chennai Egmore (MS); Velankanni (VLNK)
- Stops: 13
- Distance travelled: 353 km (219 mi)
- Average journey time: 8h 30m
- Service frequency: Daily (Note: Runs seven days in a week for every direction.)
- Train numbers: 16185/16186 &16175/16176

On-board services
- Classes: AC 2 tier, AC 3 tier, Sleeper class, General Unreserved
- Seating arrangements: No
- Sleeping arrangements: Yes
- Auto-rack arrangements: Yes
- Catering facilities: On-board catering E-catering
- Observation facilities: ICF coach
- Entertainment facilities: No
- Baggage facilities: No
- Other facilities: Below the seats

Technical
- Rolling stock: 2
- Track gauge: 1,676 mm (5 ft 6 in)
- Electrification: Yes
- Operating speed: 42 km/h (26 mph), including halts

The Chennai Egmore–Velankanni Link Express was an Express train belonging to Southern Railway zone that used to run between Chennai Egmore and Velankanni in India. It was operated with 16185/16186 train numbers on a daily basis.

== Service ==
The 16185/Chennai Egmore–Velankanni Link Express had an average speed of 42 km/h and covered 353 km in 8h 30m. The 16186/Velankanni–Chennai Egmore Link Express had an average speed of 42 km/h and covered 353 km in 8h 30m.

== Route and halts ==
The important halts of the train are:

- Chennai Egmore
- Tambaram
- Viluppuram Junction
- Cuddalore Port Junction
- Chidambaram
- Mayiladuthurai Junction
- Peralam Junction
- Thiruvarur Junction
- Nagapattinam Junction
- Velankanni

== Coach composition ==
The train had standard ICF rakes with a maximum speed of 110 km/h. The train consists of 23 coaches:

- 1 AC II Tier
- 2 AC III Tier
- 10 Sleeper coaches
- 2 Slip coaches
- 6 General Unreserved
- 2 Seating cum Luggage Rake
- 1 Brake van

== Traction ==
Both trains were hauled by a Royapuram Loco Shed-based WAP-7 electric locomotive from [Chennai to Viluppuram. From Viluppuram, train was hauled by a Golden Rock Loco Shed-based WDM-3A diesel locomotive uptil Karaikal and vice versa.

== Rake sharing ==
The train shared its rake with 16187/16188 Tea Garden Express and 56385/56390 Ernakulam–Kottayam Passenger. The train was detached from Chennai Egmore–Karaikal Kamban Express at Nagappattinam and runs as Chennai Egmore–Velankanni Link Express.

== Direction reversal ==
The train reverses its direction twice:

- Thiruvarur Junction
- Nagapattinam Junction

== See also ==
- Chennai Egmore railway station
- Karaikal railway station
- Tea Garden Express
