= Tambaram Velankanni Kamban Express =

Indian express train

Chennai Egmore – Velankanni Kamban Express
Overview
- Service type: Express
- First service: 23 April 2010; 16 years ago
- Current operator: Southern Railway zone

Route
- Termini: Chennai Egmore (MS); Velankanni (VLNK )
- Stops: 13
- Distance travelled: 364 km (226 mi)
- Average journey time: 8h 45m
- Service frequency: Daily (Note: Runs seven days in a week for every direction.)
- Train number: 16175/16176

On-board services
- Classes: AC 2 tier, AC 3 tier, Sleeper class, General Unreserved
- Seating arrangements: No
- Sleeping arrangements: Yes
- Catering facilities: On-board catering E-catering
- Observation facilities: ICF coach
- Entertainment facilities: No
- Baggage facilities: No
- Other facilities: Below the seats

Technical
- Rolling stock: VLNK -MS/ MS-VLNK WAP-7 RPM 25Kva electric traction
- Track gauge: 1,676 mm (5 ft 6 in)
- Electrification: Yes
- Operating speed: 42 km/h (26 mph), including halts
Route map
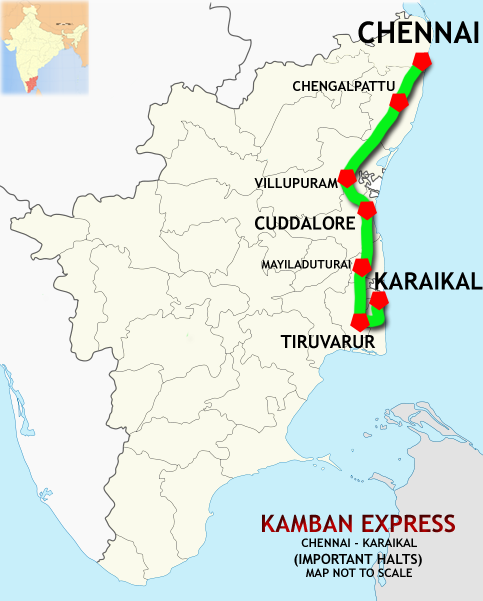

The Chennai Egmore – Velankanni Kamban Express is an Express train belonging to Southern Railway zone that runs between Chennai Egmore and Velankanni in India. It is currently being operated with 16175/16176 train numbers on a daily basis.

== History ==
During meter gauge services, this train ran as a regular express train from Nagore to Chennai via Nagapattinam, Thiruvarur, Mayiladuthurai, Villupuram in the name of Kamban express. This train got its name Kamban express because one of the famous Tamil poet Kamban's tomb is situated at Nattarasankottai near Sivagangai and Kambar birth is located at Thiruvezhumbur near Kuthalam, as this train passes through these two important places in the history of Kamban, so this train got its name as Kamban express. This train had slip coaches dedicated for Karaikkudi in the past while the remaining coaches of the express train were sent to Nagore via Nagapattinam and to Velankanni (till 2020, post conversion to broad gauge). During those times, this train was numbered as 6175/76. Except the Thiruvarur - Karaikudi section, all the other meter gauge railway tracks were converted to broad gauge around 2010 itself. But the Thiruvarur Karaikudi section underwent gauge conversion circa 2013 only. In this intermediate period(2010-13), the Kamban express was running between Karaikal and Chennai Egmore via nagore, Thiruvarur, Mayiladuthurai, Villupuram which is its old slip coach route and a new slip coach route from Nagapattinam to Velankanni as Velankanni express. Around 2019, gauge conversion of the thiruvarur karaikudi section was completed and opened for passenger traffic and the Peralam Karaikal line also underwent reconstruction and gauge conversion process and was completed by 2026. Now railways operates this train from Tambaram to Velankanni via Villupuram, Mayiladuthurai, Peralam, Thirunallaru, Karaikal from 20 may 2026.

== Service ==
The 16175/Tambaram–Velankanni Kamban Express has an average speed of 46 km/h and covers 324 km in 7hrs. The 16176/Velankanni–Tambaram Kamban Express has an average speed of 48 km/h and covers 324 km in 6hrs 45min.

== Route and halts ==
The important halts of the train are:

- Tambaram
- Chengalpattu Junction
- Viluppuram Junction
- Cuddalore Port Junction
- Sirkazhi
- Mayiladuthurai Junction
- Peralam Junction
- Thiruvarur Junction
- Nagapattinam Junction
- Karaikal
- Velankanni

== Coach composition ==
The train has standard ICF rakes with a maximum speed of 110 km/h. The train consists of 23 coaches:

- 1 AC II Tier
- 2 AC III Tier
- 13 Sleeper coaches
- 5 General Unreserved
- 2 Seating cum Luggage Rake

== Traction ==
Both trains are hauled by a Royapuram Loco Shed-based WAP-7 electric locomotive from Chennai to Velankanni and vice versa.

== Rake sharing ==
The train shares its rake with 16187/16188 Tea Garden Express, 56005/56006 Ernakulam–Kottayam Passenger, 56007/8 Mayiladuthurai-Velankanni passenger, 56009/10 Mayiladuthurai-Karaikal passenger. From there, both the trains reaches their destination as single trains.

== See also ==
- Chennai Egmore railway station
- Karaikal railway station
- Chennai Egmore–Velankanni Link Express
- Tea Garden Express
