= Tiruturaipundi Junction railway station =

Railway station in Tamil Nadu, India

Tiruturaipundi Junction திருத்துறைப்பூண்டி சந்திப்பு
- Thiruthuraipoondi Junction

General information
- Location: Railway Station, Thiruthuraipoondi, Tiruvarur, Tamil Nadu; India
- Coordinates: 10.5318°N 79.6301°E
- Elevation: 17 m (56 ft)
- System: Indian Railways station
- Owner: Indian Railways
- Operator: Southern Railway zone
- Line: Thiruvarur Junction–Karaikudi Junction Tiruturaipundi Junction - point Calimere line Nagapattinam–Tiruturaipundi Junction line
- Platforms: 3 + 1
- Tracks: 5
- Connections: Bus stand, taxicab stand, auto rickshaw stand

Construction
- Structure type: Standard (on-ground station)
- Parking: Yes
- Accessible: Disabled access

Other information
- Status: Functioning
- Station code: TTP
- Zone(s): Southern Railway
- Division(s): Tiruchirapalli

History
- Opened: 1894; 132 years ago
- Rebuilt: 2019; 7 years ago
- Electrified: 25 kV AC 50 Hz
Route map
Location
- Location within Tamil Nadu Location within India

Tiruturaipundi Junction railway station is a junction railway station serving the town of Thiruthuraipoondi in Tamil Nadu, India. This station was first opened on 02.04.1894 along with mayavaram jn (Present Mayiladuthurai Jn) to muthupettai section.15.05.1919 Tiruturaipundi Junction - point Calimere line opened for traffic that day this station become junction.This station Is the only junction situated between thiruvarur -karaikudi section. The station is a part of the Tiruchirapalli railway division of the Southern Railway zone Railway station code: TTP.

== Location and layout ==
The railway station is located off the State Highway 63 or Railway Station Road, of Thiruthuraipoondi. The nearest bus depot is located in Thiruthuraipoondi while the nearest airport is situated 109 kilometres (68 mi) away in Tiruchirappalli. The station has three platforms and over five tracks in broad gauge.

== Lines ==
No's	Line's
I	Tiruturaipundi Junction -Mayiladuthurai Junction via Thiruvarur Junction
II	Tiruturaipundi Junction - Point Calimere
III	Tiruturaipundi Junction -Nagapattinam Junction
IV	Tiruturaipundi Junction - Karaikudi Junction

== Metre gauge ==
The century-old metre-gauge line was laid by the British and the first train was operated on 02.04.1894. The last train on the metre-gauge from Thiruvarur started at 8 pm on 18 October 2012 and completed its journey at Thiruthuraipoondi at 8:45 pm, This was the last metre-gauge section to be upgraded into broad-gauge segment by the Southern Railway. All of eleven stations were closed from 19 October 2012.

== Rail Bus ==
The Southern Railway operated its last Meter Gauge (MG) Rail bus on the Thiruthuraipoondi to Agasthiyampalli (via Vedaranyam) section until 2005, Passengers could board it just like a bus, and tickets were issued on board running and the rails laid on traditional wooden sleepers.

== Gauge conversion ==
The after-conversion work of the Thiruvarur–Karaikudi broad-gauge section was opened to traffic in 2019. Tiruturaipundi Junction railway station - Agasthiyampalli railway line Opened for traffic on 08.04.2023. It is the last railway junction to be completely converted to broad gauge from meter gauge as all remaining railway junctions(not to be confused with railway station) were converted into broad gauge in Tamil Nadu as well as in southern railway zone.

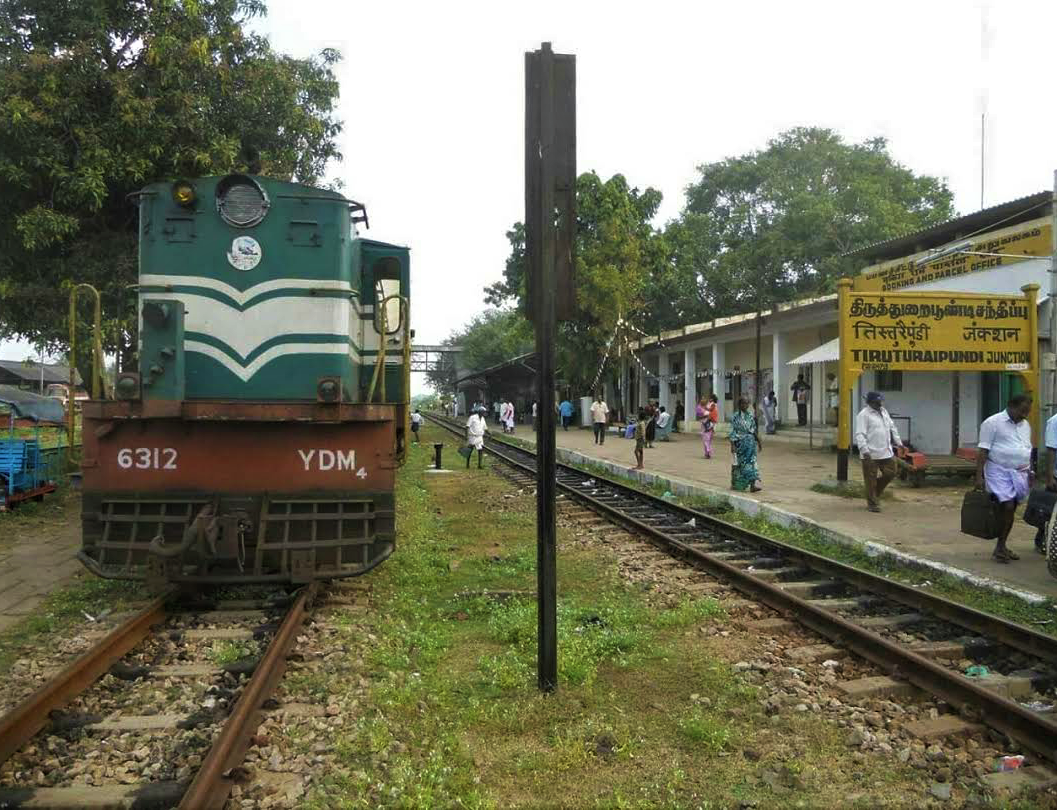

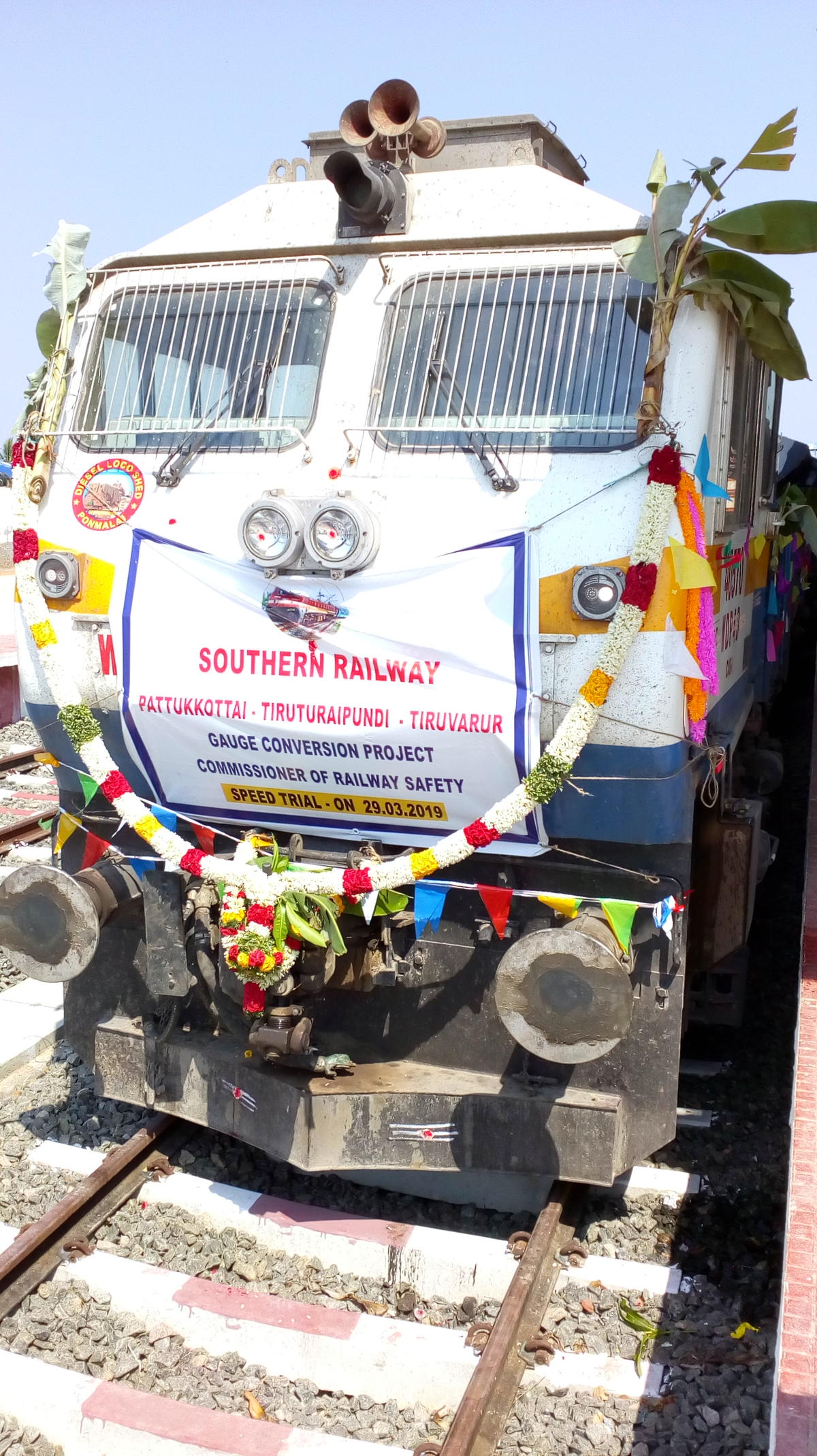
Speed trial on new BG line

== Services ==
Train number	Train name
56827/ 56828	Thiruvarur - Karaikudi Passenger
16361/ 16362	Ernakulam Velankanni Express(Bi-Weekly)
20683/ 20684	Tambaram-Sengottai Super Fast
76831/ 76832	Thiruvarur - Pattukottai Demu
16103 / 16104	Tambaram–Rameswaram Express
56835/ 56837	Mayiladuturai - Karaikudi Passenger
76827	Agasthiyampalli - Thiruvarur Demu
76828 / 76829	Tiruturaipundi - Agastiyampalli Demu
76830	Thiruvarur - Agastiyampalli DEMU
06717	Tiruturaipundi - Tiruchirappalli DEMU
06718	Thanjavur - Tiruturaipundi DEMU

16361/16362 Ernakulam Velankanni Express Weekly operated from 04-June-2022 Via Kottayam, Changanassery, Kayamkulam, Kollam, Sengottai, Sivakasi, Virudhunagar, Aruppukkottai, Karaikudi, Pattukkottai, Thiruthuraipoondi, Thiruvarur, Nagapattinam.

07695/07696 Secunderabad - Rameshwaram Express Weekly Via Guntur, Gudur, Chennai Egmore, Tambaram, Chengalpattu, villupuram, Cuddalore, Chidambaram, Mayiladuthurai, Thiruvarur, Pattukottai, Karaikudi, Manamadurai, Paramakudi, Ramanathapuram.

20683/20684 Tambaram-Sengottai Super Fast Express operated from 08.04.2023 via Viluppuram–Mayiladuthurai–Thiruvarur–Thiruthuraipoondi–Pattukkottai–Karaikudi–Aruppukkottai-Tirunelveli–Tenkasi.
