= Ernakulam–Velankanni Express =

Railway in India

ERNAKULAM-VELANKANNI BI-WEEKLY EXPRESS

Overview
- Service type: Regional rail Express
- Status: Operating
- Locale: Tamil Nadu & Kerala
- First service: 28 August 2023; 2 years ago (Commercial run)
- Current operator: Southern Railway zone

Route
- Termini: Ernakulam Junction (ERS); Velankanni(VLNK)
- Stops: 31
- Distance travelled: 690 km (430 mi)
- Average journey time: 16 h 45 m
- Service frequency: 16361- Mon, Sat 16362- Tue, Sun
- Train number: 16361/16362

On-board services
- Classes: AC II Tier, AC III Tier, SL, GS
- Seating arrangements: Yes
- Sleeping arrangements: Yes

Technical
- Rolling stock: LHB coach
- Track gauge: 1,676 mm (5 ft 6 in)
- Operating speed: 41kmph (Avg)
- Average length: 320.978m (including engines)
- Track owner: Indian Railways
- Rake maintenance: PM @ ERS, OEA @ VLNK

The 16361/16362 Ernakulam Velankanni Express is a biweekly train service in the Southern Railway zone of India that runs between Ernakulam and Velankanni via Kottayam, Tiruvalla, Chengannur, Kayamkulam, Kollam Junction, Punalur, Tenkasi, Virudhunagar, Manamadurai, Karaikudi, Tiruturaipundi, and Thiruvarur. This train is helpful for pilgrims from Kerala to reach Velankanni Church and Nagore Dargah.

== Service ==
This train covers a distance of 690 kilometres (430 mi) with a journey time of approximately 16 3/4 hours.

It runs as a bi-weekly express with train no 16361 on Mondays and Saturdays and 16362 on Sundays and Tuesdays .

The railway board approved a biweekly express on 17/8/2023 and is running with the above numbers.

It is hauled by Erode Electric Loco shed Wap 7[Indian locomotive class between Ernakulam and Velankanni Currently On Full Journey in Both Directions of the service of Train

== Coaches ==
The train has standard LHB rakes This train does not have rake sharing and have 1 independent rake.

The train consists of 18 coaches:

- 2 AC II Tier
- 4 AC III Tier
- 9 Sleeper coaches
- 3 General Unreserved
- 2 SLR cum Luggage Rake

The number of coaches got increased from 14 to 18 from April 6, 2024, subject to positive inspection report submitted by RDSO to Southern Railway for running 22 LHB/24 ICF coaches in the Ghats section. The number of coaches increased after the extension of platforms in stations along Kollam-Sengottai section to accommodate 24 coaches.

== Direction reversal ==
The train reverses its direction twice:

- Kollam Junction railway station before entering into Kollam Sengottai Line (Ghat section with an MPS of 30kmph).
- Nagapattinam Junction railway station before entering the line to Velankanni.

== See also ==
- Palaruvi Express
- Ananthapuri Express
- Quilon Mail
- Tea Garden Express
- Kollam–Sengottai Chord Line
