= Point Calimere railway station =

Railway station in Tamil Nadu, India

Point Calimere(New Name is now Kodiyakarai)

General information
- Location: Railway Station Road or State Highway 63, Point Calimere, Nagapattinam, Tamil Nadu; India
- Coordinates: 10.5318°N 79.6301°E
- Elevation: 17 m (56 ft)
- System: Indian Railways station
- Owner: Indian Railways
- Operator: Southern Railway
- Line: Thiruvarur Junction–Karaikudi Junction Tiruturaipundi Junction - point Calimere line Nagapattinam–Tiruturaipundi Junction line
- Platforms: 3
- Tracks: 5
- Connections: Bus stand, taxicab stand, auto rickshaw stand

Construction
- Structure type: Standard (on-ground station)
- Parking: Yes
- Accessible: Disabled access

Other information
- Status: Active
- Station code: PTC
- Zone(s): Southern Railway
- Division(s): Tiruchirapalli

History
- Opened: 1894; 132 years ago
- Rebuilt: 2019; 7 years ago
Route map
Location
- Location within Tamil Nadu Location within India

Point Calimere railway station (Tamil: கோடியக்கரை தொடருந்து நிலையம்), now renamed as Kodiyakarai is a terminal railway station belonging to the Southern Railway Zone of the Indian national railway system, in the Tiruchirappalli division. The station is located near to Point Calimere Wildlife and Bird Sanctuary. The station serves the town of Kodiyarkarai, which is located on the Coromandel Coast. The railway station is not in service as its rails are being converted to broad gauge. This station is connected by the Thiruthuraipoondi Junction-Point Calimere railway line, which is also in the midst of a gauge conversion process. Point Calimere railway station lies 44.42 km away from Thiruthuraipoondi junction. The railway line consists of 8 railway stations along its entire Thiruthuraipoondi Junction-Point Calimere stretch, all of which are undergoing broad gauge conversions. Once the conversion is completed, the national railway system will resume rail services for the station.

== History ==
Point Calimere railway station was built under British rule to transport salt and goods from the harbor. Later, a railbus was introduced on this route to serve the area's population. Nations second rail bus and south India's second rail bus operated till point Calimere railway station. When India gained independence IN 1947 the line was handed over to the Indian government.
