= Periyapet =

Coordinates: 12°41′N 78°36′E

- village
- Interactive map of Periyapet
- Country: India
- State: Tamil Nadu
- District: Vellore

Languages
  - Official: Tamil & Urdu
- Time zone: UTC+5:30 (IST)
- Vehicle registration: TN-

Periyapet is a locality of Vaniyambadi in Vellore District, Tamil Nadu. It is located near to the branch of river Palar. There are 4 mosques and 1 temple located here. Azhagu Perumal Temple is one of the famous temple of Vaniyambadi is located here. Villages like Old Vaniyambadi, Nadupettarai etc. are located next to the branch of river Palar. Periyapet is located nearly 1.5 km from Vaniyambadi Bus stand and Vaniyambadi Railway Station

== Educational institutions ==
The following list of schools are present at Periyapet

1. Madarasa -e- faizul aam
2. Madarasatul-banath
3. Municipal Elementary School

== Places to see ==
Masthan Dargah, one of the most old and famous dargah of Vaniyambadi, is located here. Each year, the birth of the saint Masthan Baba is celebrated here. People from all over Tamil Nadu come to see this Dargah.

== Transportation ==
Mini Bus facility is available from here to go to Vaniyambadi and villages like Ramanaickenpettai, Ambalur, Kodayanchi, Dasiriyappanur etc.
