= Tea Garden Express =

Train in India

Overview
- Service type: Regional rail Express
- Status: Operating
- Locale: Tamil Nadu and Kerala
- First service: 26 December 1944 (81 years ago)
- Current operator: Southern Railway zone
- Former operator: South Indian Railway

Route
- Termini: Karaikal (KIK); Ernakulam Junction (ERS)
- Stops: 26
- Distance travelled: 593 km (368 mi)
- Average journey time: 14 Hours 15 Minutes
- Service frequency: Daily
- Train number: 16187 / 16188
- Lines used: Jolarpettai–Shoranur line (ED – SRR); Shoranur–Cochin Harbour section (SRR – ERS)

On-board services
- Classes: AC 2 Tier, AC 3 Tier, Sleeper Class, General Unreserved
- Disabled access: Disabled access
- Seating arrangements: Corridor coach (Unreserved)
- Sleeping arrangements: Couchette car
- Auto-rack arrangements: No
- Catering facilities: No
- Observation facilities: Windows in all carriages
- Entertainment facilities: No
- Baggage facilities: Overhead racks Baggage carriage

Technical
- Rolling stock: Locomotive: WAP4 (AJJ/ED); Coach: One AC 2–Tier (2A); Two AC 3–Tier (3A); Thirteen II Sleeper; Five UR / GS; Two SLR
- Track gauge: 1,676 mm (5 ft 6 in)
- Electrification: Yes
- Operating speed: 42 kilometres per hour (26 mph)
- Track owner: Southern Railway zone
- Timetable number: 86 / 86A
Route map
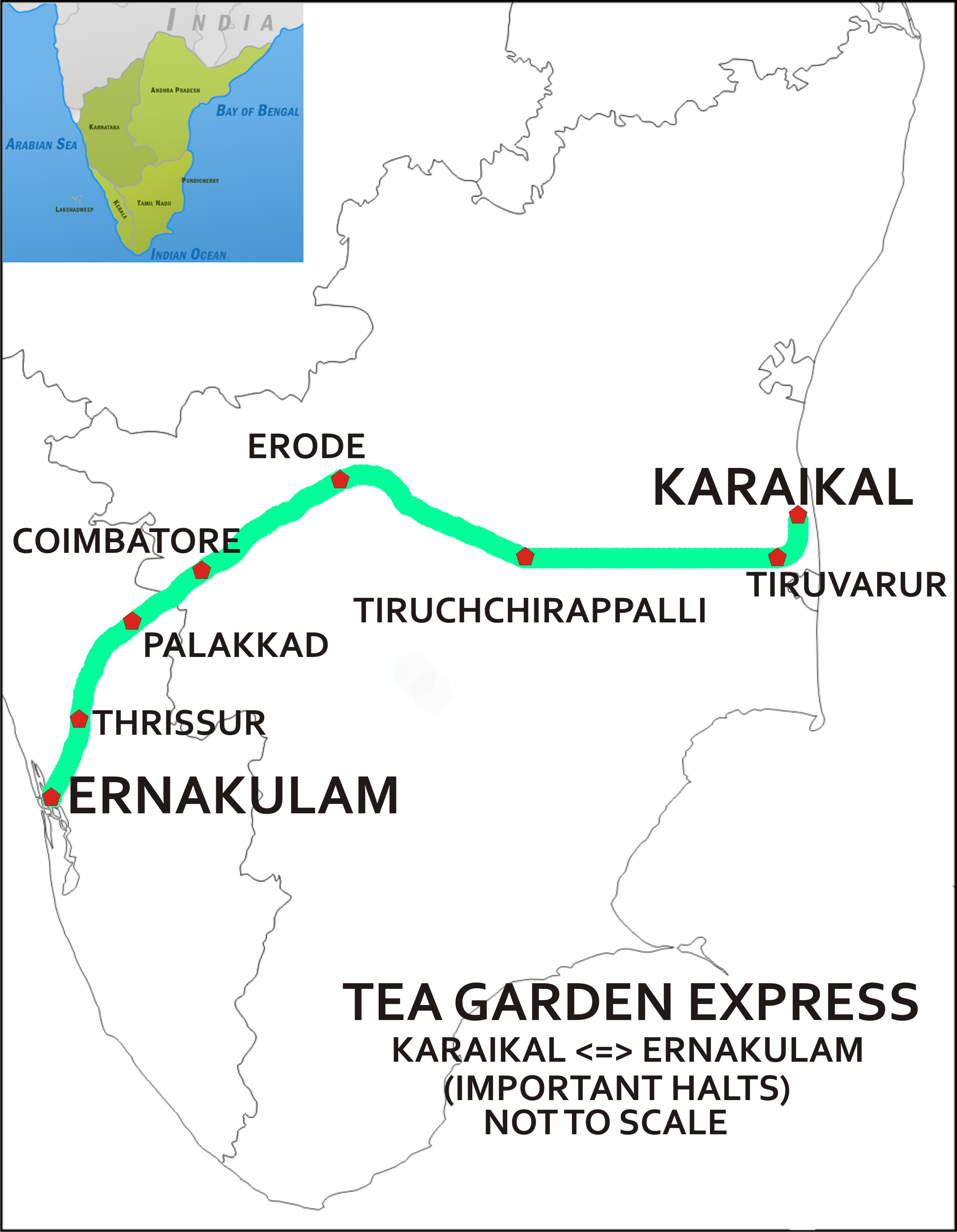

Tea Garden Express (Officially known as Karaikal – Ernakulam Express) is an overnight regional rail connecting Karaikal in Union Territory of Puducherry with Ernakulam in Kerala.

== History ==
The train introduced during the 1940s, as Ooty–Cochin express to transport tea and related products from the Nilgiris to Cochin Port and further exported to Europe and world over, hence came the name of the train. It ran in narrow gauge between Udhagamandalam and Mettupalayam and broad gauge between Mettupalayam and Cochin Harbour Terminus. Post Indian independence, the Ooty–Mettupalayam trip was cut–off and the train ran as No.565/566 between Cochin Harbour Terminus and Mettupalayam, since the 1970s. Then, the Mettupalayam–Coimbatore Junction portion was cut–off and was re-routed to Tiruchirappalli Junction from Cochin (Ernakulam Junction), numbered as 6865 / 6866. In the 2009–2010 Railway Budget, it was announced that the service will be extended to Nagore, and the extension was effected on 30 March 2010. The number of train was changed from the 6865 / 6866 to 16865 / 16866 since December 2010 onwards, as a part of train management system over the entire Indian Railways network. The train services were further extended to Karaikal from 17 December 2011 onwards and re–numbered from 16865 / 16866 to 16187 / 16188, since 1 September 2013.

== Importance ==
This train provides connectivity for the people of Kerala and western districts to educational institutions and places of worship in delta districts, viz., Navagraham temples like Tirunallar Saniswaran Temple and Thyagaraja Temple, Tiruvarur others, Nagore Dargah and Velankanni Matha shrine.

== Rakes ==
This train has 23 coaches composing all six classes: One AC 2–Tier (2A), Two AC 3–Tier (3A), Thirteen II Sleeper coaches (SL), five Unreserved (general) coaches (UR / GS) and two Luggage rakes (SLR). (Note: The coach composition is subject to change.)

Loco	1	2	3	4	5	6	7	8	9	10	11	12	13	14	15	16	17	18	19	20	21	22	23
	SLR	GS	GS	GS	A1	B1	B2	S1	S2	S3	S4	S5	S6	S7	S8	S9	S10	S11	S12	S13	GS	GS	SLR

The train reverses its direction once at Tiruchirappalli Junction.

It shares rake with Kamban Express and 56005/56006 Ernakulam–Kottayam-Ernakulam Passenger.

== Schedule ==
The train numbered 16187 departs Karaikal as Ernakulam Express at 16:30 hours, arrives Tiruchirappalli Junction at 19:50 hours, reverses loco and departs at 20:00 hours and finally arrives Ernakulam Junction at 07:00 hours, the next day. On the return direction, the train numbered 16188 departs Ernakulam Junction as Karaikal Express at 22:30 hours, arrives Tiruchirappalli Junction at 07:55 hours, the next day, reverses loco and departs at 08:05 hours and finally arrives Karaikal at 11:55 hours. Some of the prominent stoppages for the train are Nagapattinam Junction, Thiruvarur Junction, Thanjavur Junction, Karur Junction, Erode Junction, Coimbatore Junction and Palakkad Junction. (Note: The timings are in Indian Standard Time.)

== See also ==
- Tambaram–Mangaluru Central Express
- Guruvayur Express
