= Lokmanya Tilak Terminus–Karaikal Weekly Express =

Train in India

Overview
- Service type: Express
- First service: 27 October 2013; 12 years ago
- Current operator: Central Railway zone

Route
- Termini: Lokmanya Tilak Terminus (LTT); Karaikal (KIK)
- Stops: 29
- Distance travelled: 1,628 km (1,012 mi)
- Average journey time: 30 hours 40 minutes
- Service frequency: Weekly (Note: Runs one days in a week for every direction.)
- Train number: 11017/11018

On-board services
- Classes: AC 2 Tier, AC 3 Tier, AC 3 Tier Economy, Sleeper Class, General Unreserved
- Seating arrangements: No
- Sleeping arrangements: Yes
- Catering facilities: No
- Observation facilities: LHB coach
- Entertainment facilities: No

Technical
- Rolling stock: 2
- Track gauge: 1,676 mm (5 ft 6 in)
- Operating speed: 53 km/h (33 mph)
Route map
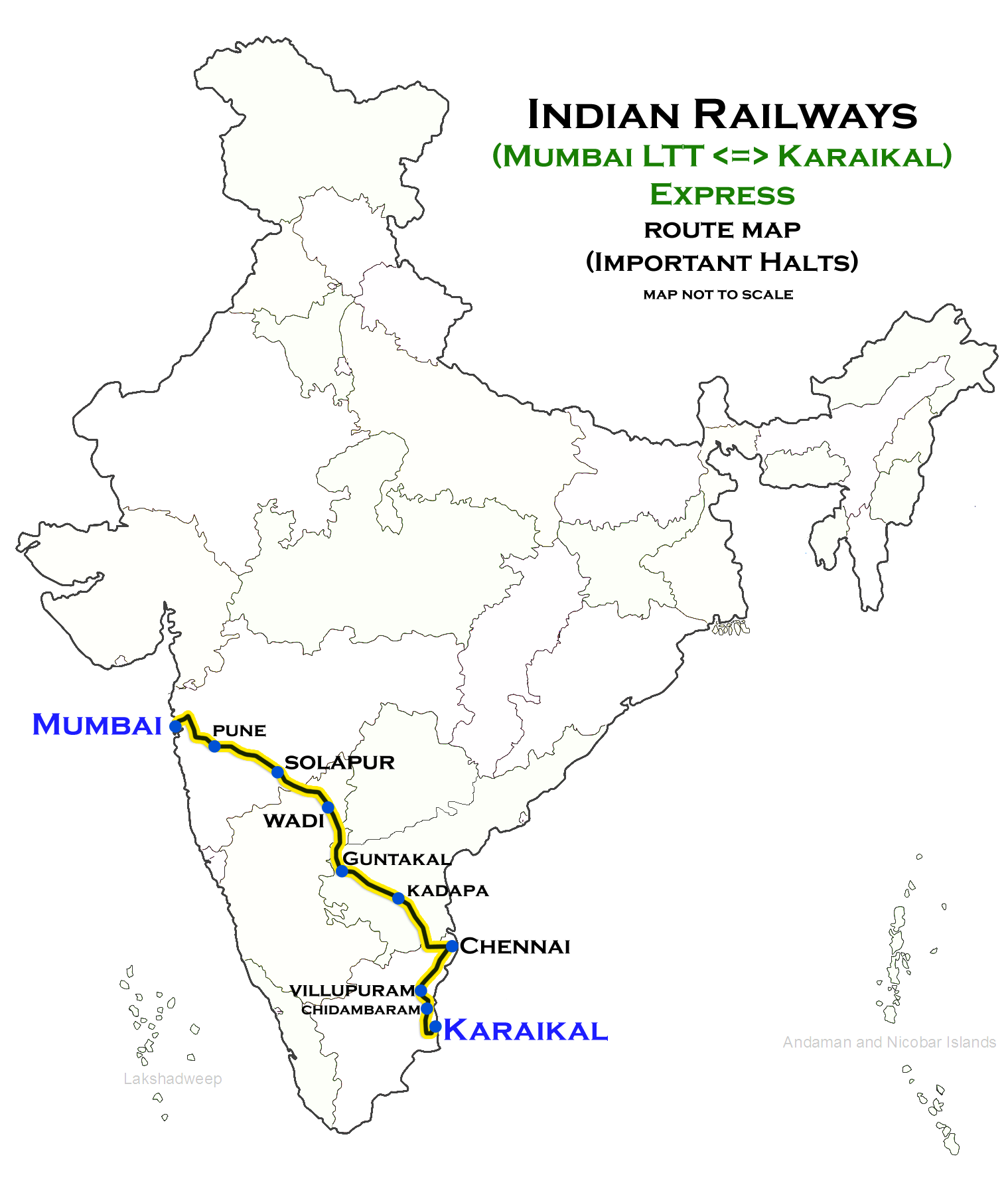

Lokmanya Tilak Terminus–Karaikal Weekly Express is an express train of the Indian Railways connecting Lokmanya Tilak Terminus in Maharashtra and Karaikal of Union Territory of Puducherry, near Tamilnadu. It is currently being operated with 11017/11018 train numbers on a weekly basis.

== Service ==
The 11017/Mumbai LTT–Karaikal Weekly Express has an average speed of 53 km/h and covers 1628 km in 30 hrs. 40 mins. 11018/Karaikal–Mumbai LTT Weekly Express has an average speed of 48 km/h and covers 1634 km in 33 hrs. 45 mins. This train was initially planned to operate between Mumbai LTT to Velankanni due to huge demand from devotees but later destination changed to Karaikal.

== Route and halts ==
The important halts of the train are:

- Lokmanya Tilak Terminus
- Thane
- Kalyan Junction
- Karjat
- Lonavala
- Pune Junction
- Solapur
- Kalaburagi Junction
- Wadi Junction
- Raichur Junction
- Guntakal Junction
- Renigunta Junction
- Arakkonam Junction
- Chennai Egmore
- Tambaram
- Viluppuram Junction
- Chidambaram
- Mayiladuthurai Junction
- Thiruvarur Junction
- Nagore
- Karaikal

== Coach composition ==
The train has standard LHB rakes with a maximum speed of 130 km/h. The train consists of 23 coaches:

- 1 AC II Tier
- 5 AC III Tier
- 1 AC III Tier Economy
- 10 Sleeper coaches
- 3 General
- 2 Luggage cum Generator car

== Traction ==
Both trains are hauled by a Kalyan Loco Shed-based WDM-3D or WDP-4D diesel locomotive from Kurla to Guntakal & Royapuram Loco Shed-based WAP-4 electric locomotive from Guntakal to Chennai Egmore and Golden Rock based WDM-3D pulls to its end & vice versa.

== Rake sharing ==
The train shares its rake with 11011/12 Lokmanya Tilak Terminus–Hazur Sahib Nanded Express

== Direction reversal ==
Train reverses its direction 1 times:

- Thiruvarur Junction

== Schedule ==
Train number	Station code	Departure station	Departure time	Departure day	Arrival station	Arrival time	Arrival day
11018	KIK	Karaikal	14:00	Monday	Lokmanya Tilak Terminus	20:30	Tuesday
11017	LTT	Lokmanya Tilak Terminus	13:15	Saturday	Karaikal	18:55	Sunday
