= Khaderpet =

Coordinates: 17°52′N 79°51′E

- village
- Interactive map of Khaderpet
- Country: India
- State: Tamil Nadu
- District: Vellore

Languages
  - Official: Tamil
- Time zone: UTC+5:30 (IST)
- Vehicle registration: TN-

Khaderpet is one of the locality of Vaniyambadi in Vellore District, Tamil Nadu.

All important places of Vaniyambadi like bus stand and railway station, police station, daily bazaar and weekly market are located here. The office of Vaniyambadi (State Assembly Constituency) is located here. Periyapet is 1.5 km from here.

There is also a street name Khaderpet in Tiruppur which is different from the one in Vaniyambadi.
