= Ramanaickenpettai =

Ramanaickenpettai Ramanaickenpet
- Village Panchayat
- Location in Tamil Nadu, India
- Coordinates: 12.661778°N 78.548298°E
- Country: India
- State: Tamil Nadu
- District: Tirupattur
- Elevation: 143 m (469 ft)

Population (2001)
  - Total: 12,468

Languages
  - Official: Tamil
- Time zone: UTC+5:30 (IST)
- PIN: 635801
- Vehicle registration: TN83

Ramanaickenpettai is a Village panchayat in Vaniyambadi of Tirupathur district of the Indian state of Tamil Nadu.

== Geography ==
Ramanaickenpettai is situated near a branch of the renowned Palar River and holds a central geographic position between the major cities of Chennai and Bengaluru. Positioned just 4.6 kilometers away from National Highway NH48, this strategic location enhances its accessibility and connectivity. The proximity to this vital national highway facilitates efficient transportation.

Yelagiri hill is located 23 km from here. A good hill station in Tirupattur district of Tamil Nadu, India, situated off the Vaniyambadi-Tirupattur road. Located at an altitude of 1,410 metres and spread across 30 km^{2}, the Yelagiri village (also spelled Elagiri) is surrounded by orchards, rose-gardens, and green valleys.

== Temples ==
One mosque and eight temples are located there. Samundeswari Amman Temple is one of the famous temples of Ramanaickenpettai. Villages like Vadakkapattu, Avarankuppam, and others, are located next to the branch of the river Palar. Ramanaickenpettai is located nearly 12.1 km from Vaniyambadi bus stand and Vaniyambadi Railway Station.

The Samundeshwari Amman Temple is the scene of Samundeshwari Amman Thiru Viza, a festival that is held every five years. The Riverside Shiva and Ganesha temples are ancient.

== Schools ==
The following schools are in the village:

- Government Higher Secondary School Ramanaickenpettai
- Arshiya Fathima matriculation high School
- Government Elementary School Ramanaickenpettai

The following schools are outside of the village:

- Gajalnaickenpettai Girls Higher Secondary School
- Ambalur Government Higher Secondary School
- Theemampettai Girls High School
- Bhommikupan Girls High School
- Keethandapatti Girls High School
- Pachur Girls Higher Secondary School
- Periyangkuppam Girls High School

== Facilities ==
The facilities in the village include:

- Library
- Post Office
- Bank of Baroda branch
- Hatsun Milk
- Aavin dairy.
- Sri Ganesha Pyramid Meditation Center

== Infrastructure and facilities ==
Roads link it to Avarankkuppam, Ambalur, Puthukoil, Vaniyambadi, Thiruppatur, Nattrampalli, Kanakanachiyamman Temple, Andhra (West), Puthu koil and Natrampalli and Dasariyappanoor. The western side is bordered by the Palar river that forms the border of Andhra Pradesh State.
