= Kodayanchi =

- village
- Country: India
- State: Tamil Nadu
- District: Vellore

Languages
  - Official: Tamil
- Time zone: UTC+5:30 (IST)
- PIN: 635801
- Vehicle registration: TN-23
- Nearest city: Chennai
- Lok Sabha constituency: Vellore

Kodayanchi is the village located next to Vaniyambadi, Vellore district, Tamil Nadu, India.
