= Udagamandalam railway station =

Railway station in Tamil Nadu, India

Udagamandalam Ooty
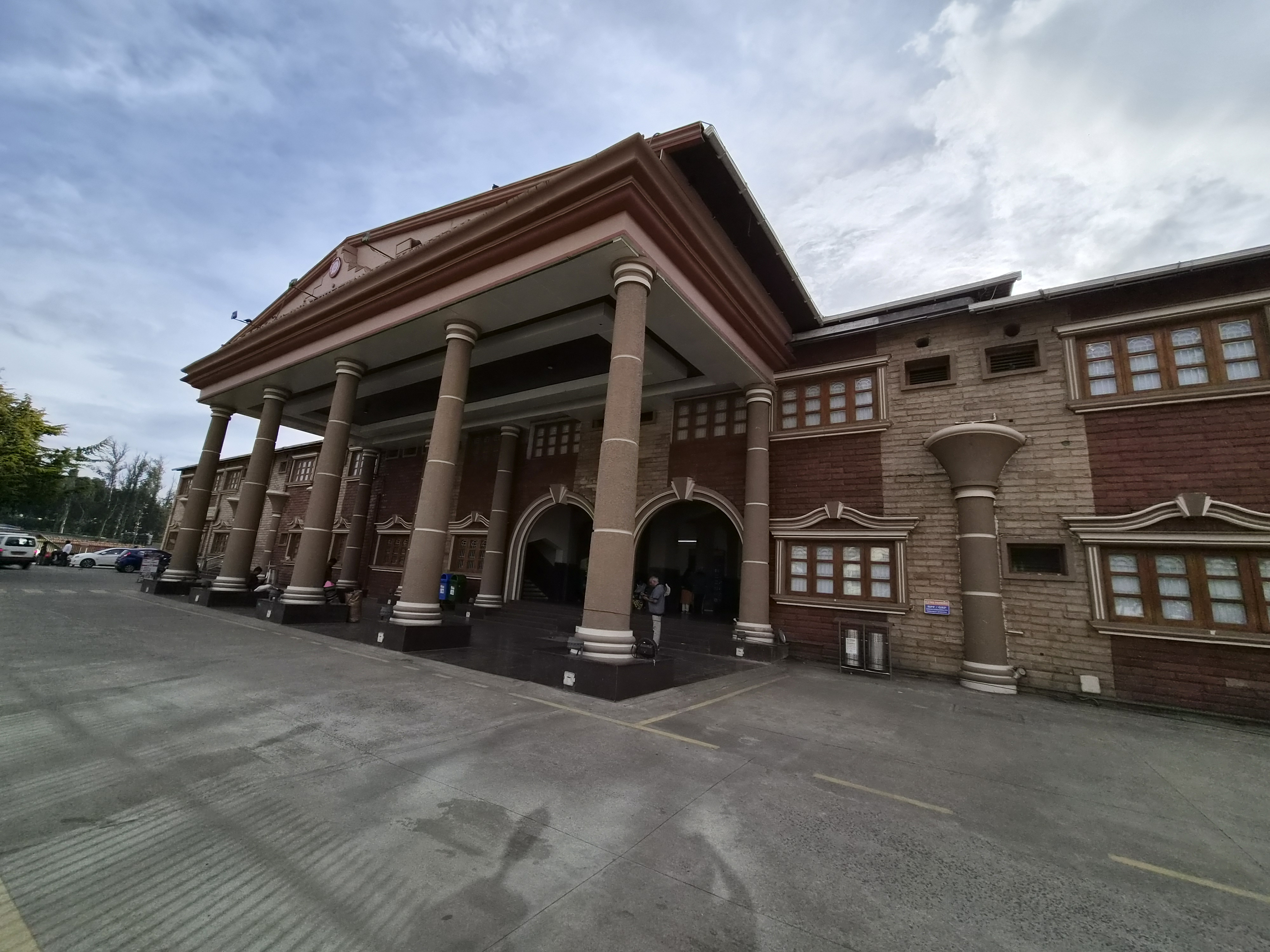
- Udagamandalam railway station

General information
- Location: Nilgiri; India
- Coordinates: 11.4053°N 76.6962°E
- Elevation: 2,200 metres (7,200 ft)
- System: Light rail
- Owner: Indian Railways
- Operator: Southern Railway zone
- Line: Nilgiri Mountain Railway
- Distance: 500 metres
- Platforms: 2
- Tracks: 3
- Connections: Bus

Construction
- Structure type: At-grade
- Depth: 2,000 ft (610 m)
- Platform levels: 2
- Parking: Yes
- Cycle facilities: Yes
- Accessible: yes

Other information
- Station code: UAM
- Fare zone: Indian Railways

History
- Opened: 1908; 118 years ago
- Former names: Ooty terminus

Passengers
- 90000: 1 crore 2 lakhs
- 5000

Services
2
Route map
- NILGIRI MOUNTAIN RAILWAY MAP
Location
- Location within India Location within Tamil Nadu

Udagamandalam railway station, also known as Ooty railway station,(station code: UAM) is an NSG–4 category Indian railway station in Salem railway division of Southern Railway zone. It is a terminus station in Ooty, Tamil Nadu. The terminus is a part of the Nilgiri Mountain Railway, a World Heritage Site.

== History ==
The station was opened in year 1908, when Nilgiri Mountain Railway line was extended to Udagamandalam. The railway code for Udagamandalam is UAM. The heritage Nilgiri Mountain railway takes almost two hours of journey to travel down to town of Mettupalayam in Coimbatore at the foothill of Nilgiri mountains.

== Projects and development ==
It is one of the 73 stations in Tamil Nadu to be named for upgradation under Amrit Bharat Station Scheme of Indian Railways.

== Gallery ==
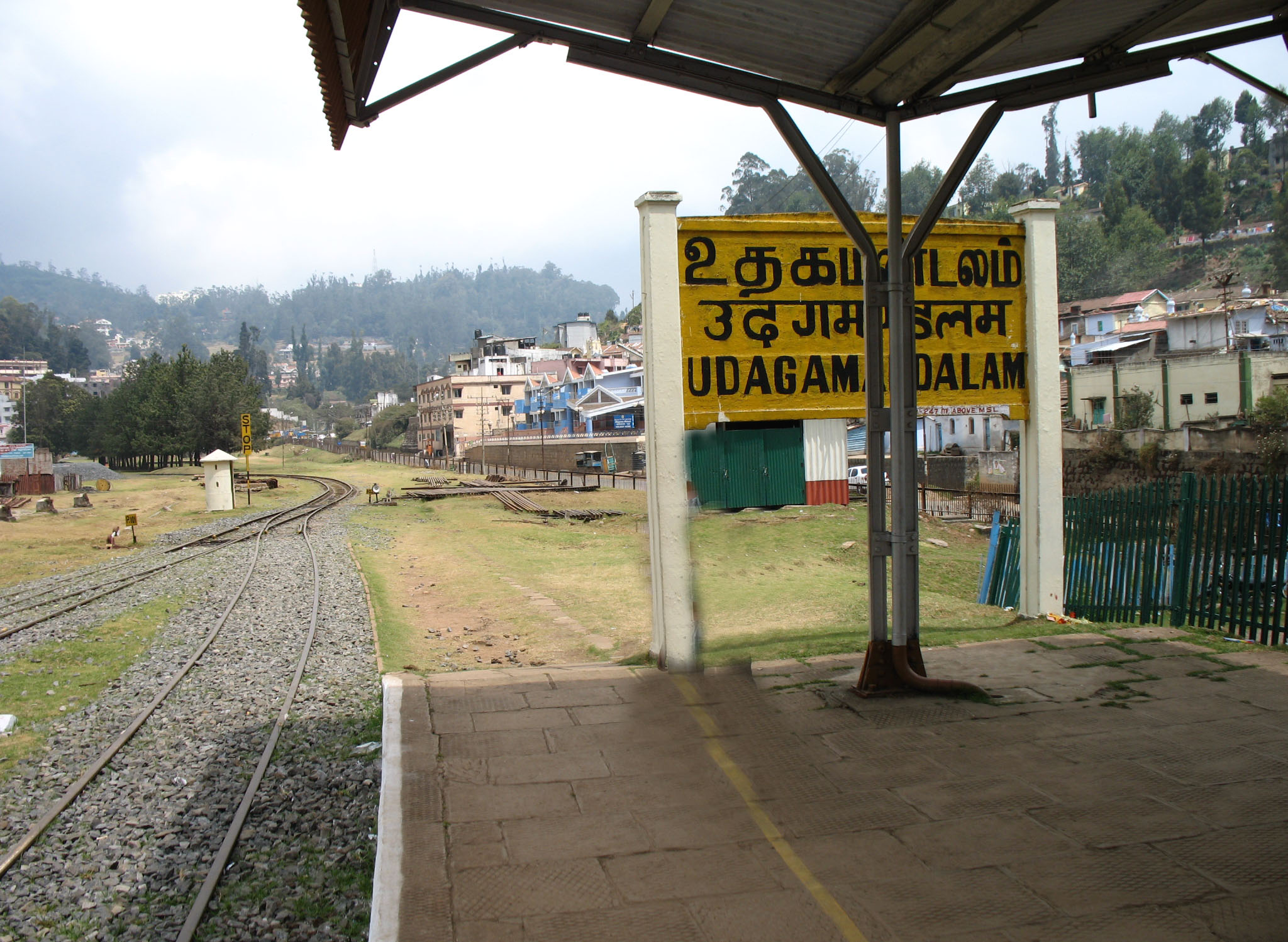
Udagamandalam railway station name board year 2007

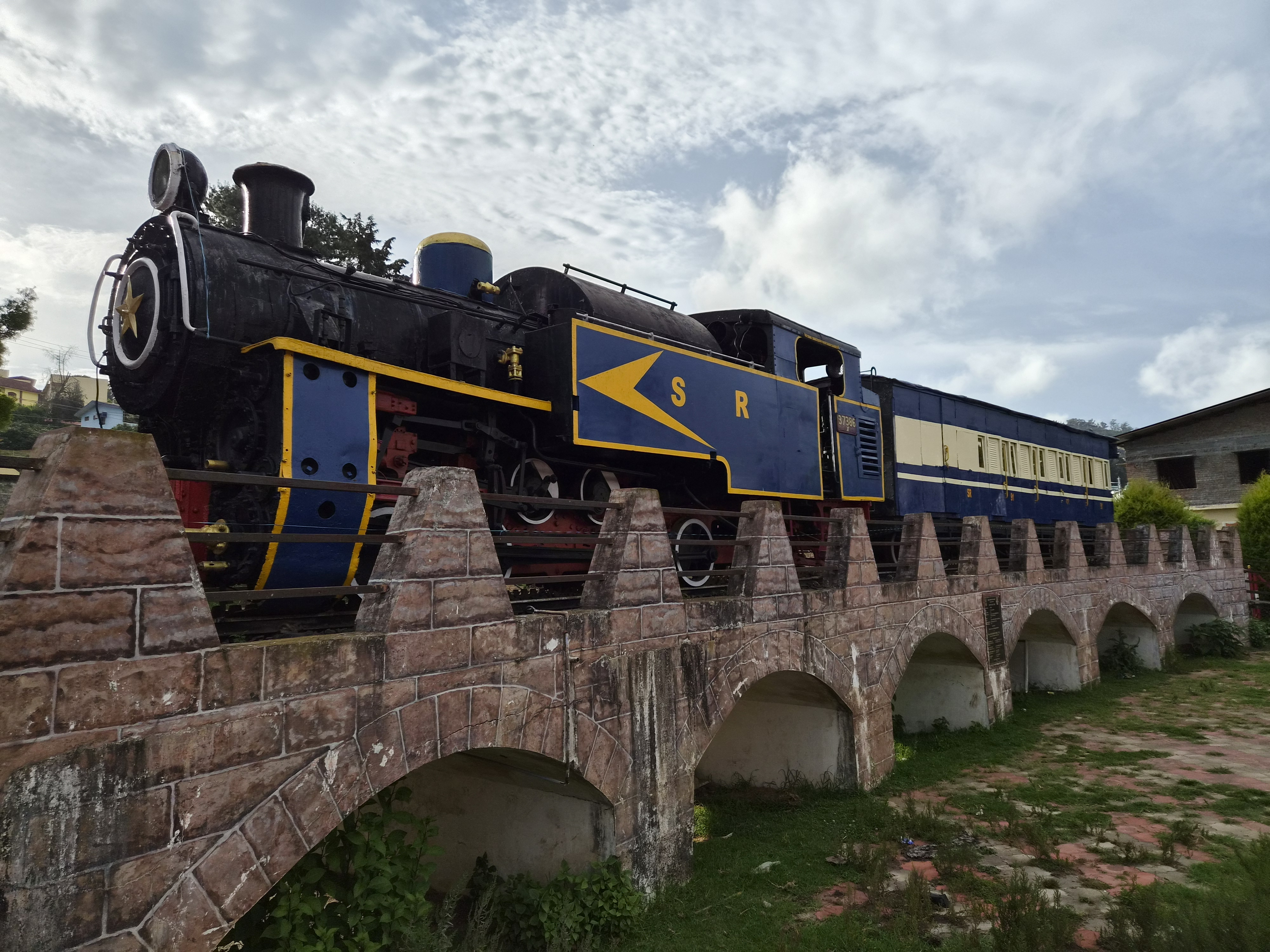
X Class locomotive preserved at Ooty railway station

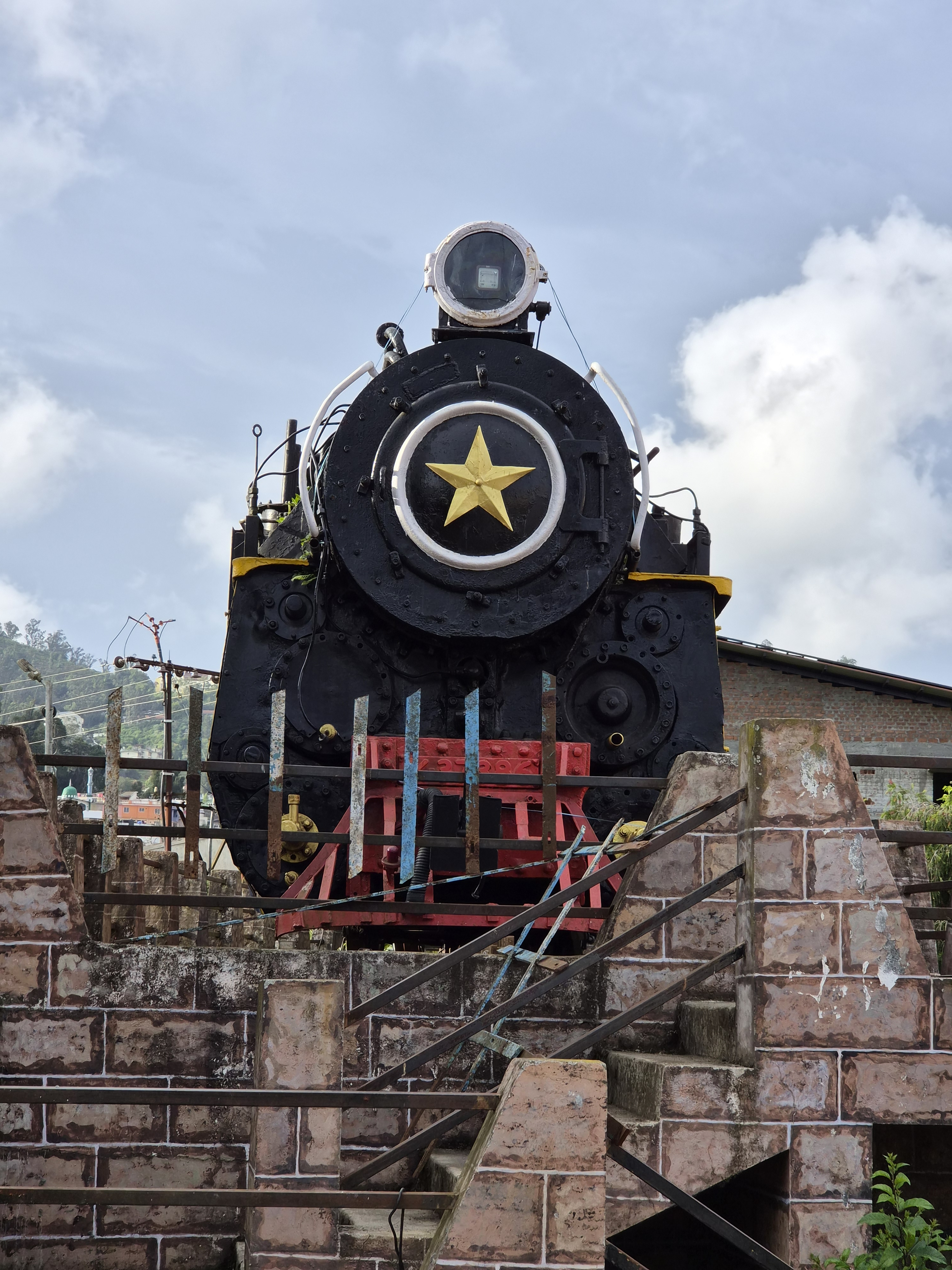
X Class locomotive preserved at Ooty railway station

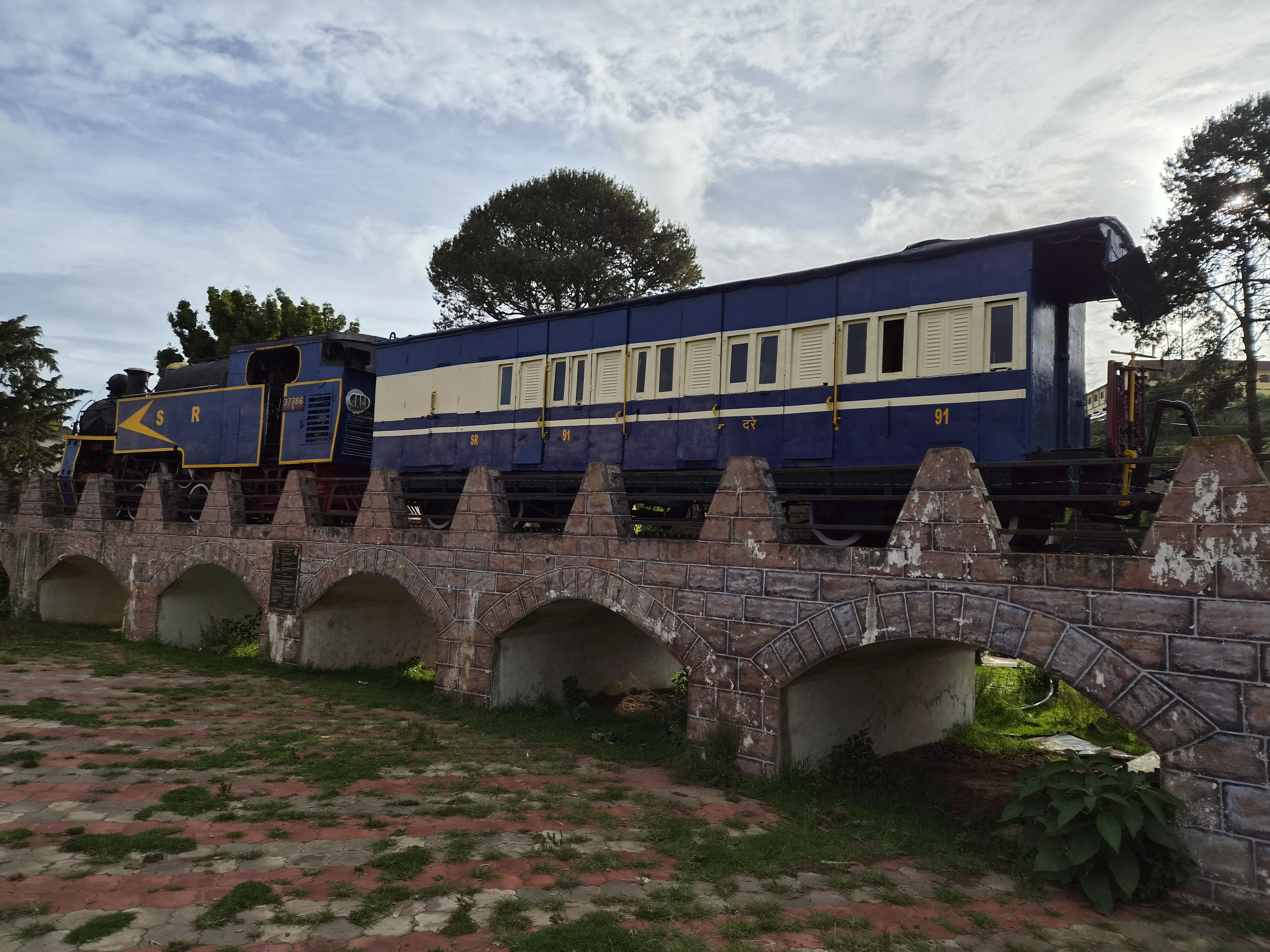
X Class locomotive preserved at Ooty railway station

Udagamandalam railway station name board year 2026

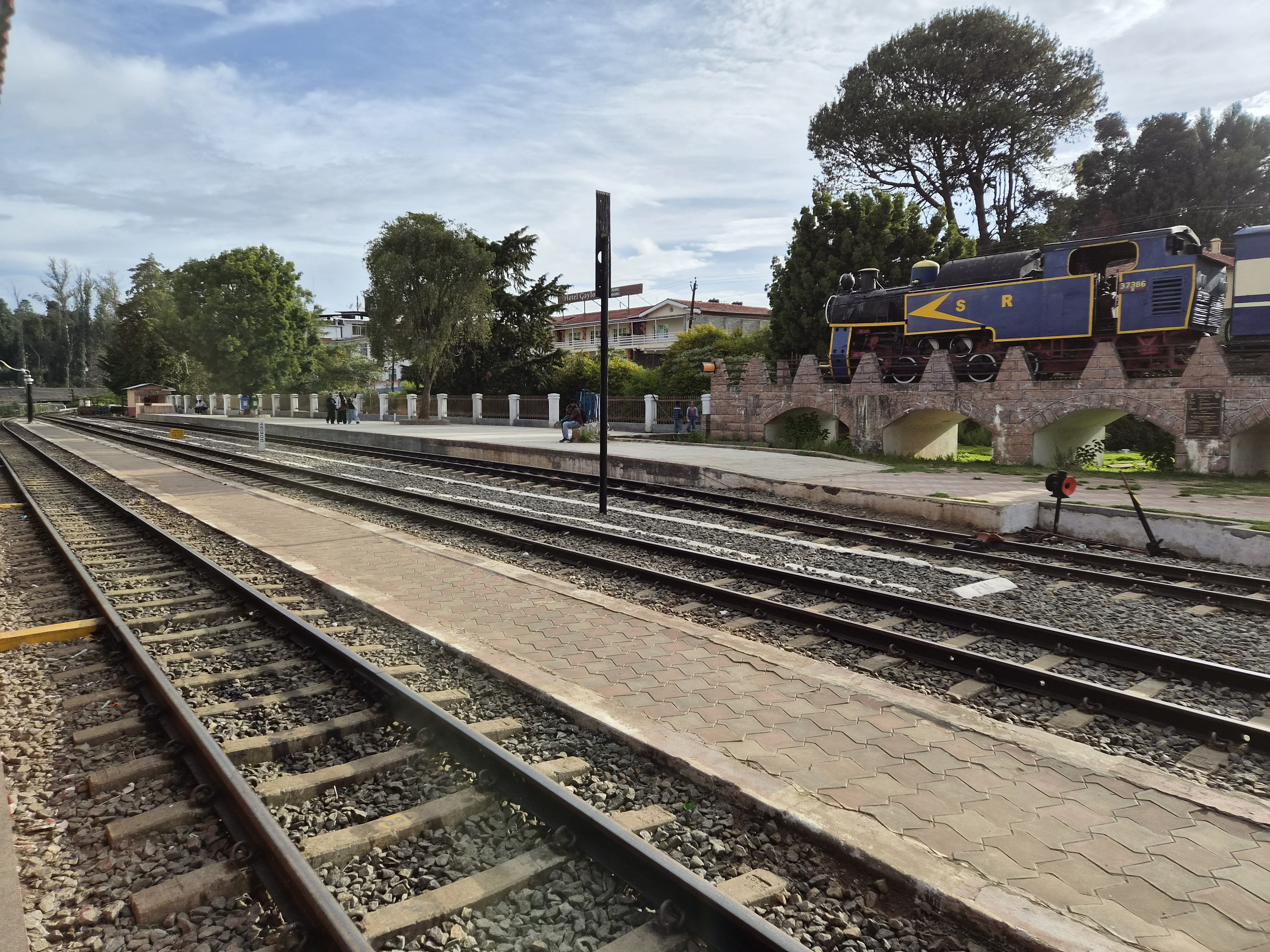
Platforms

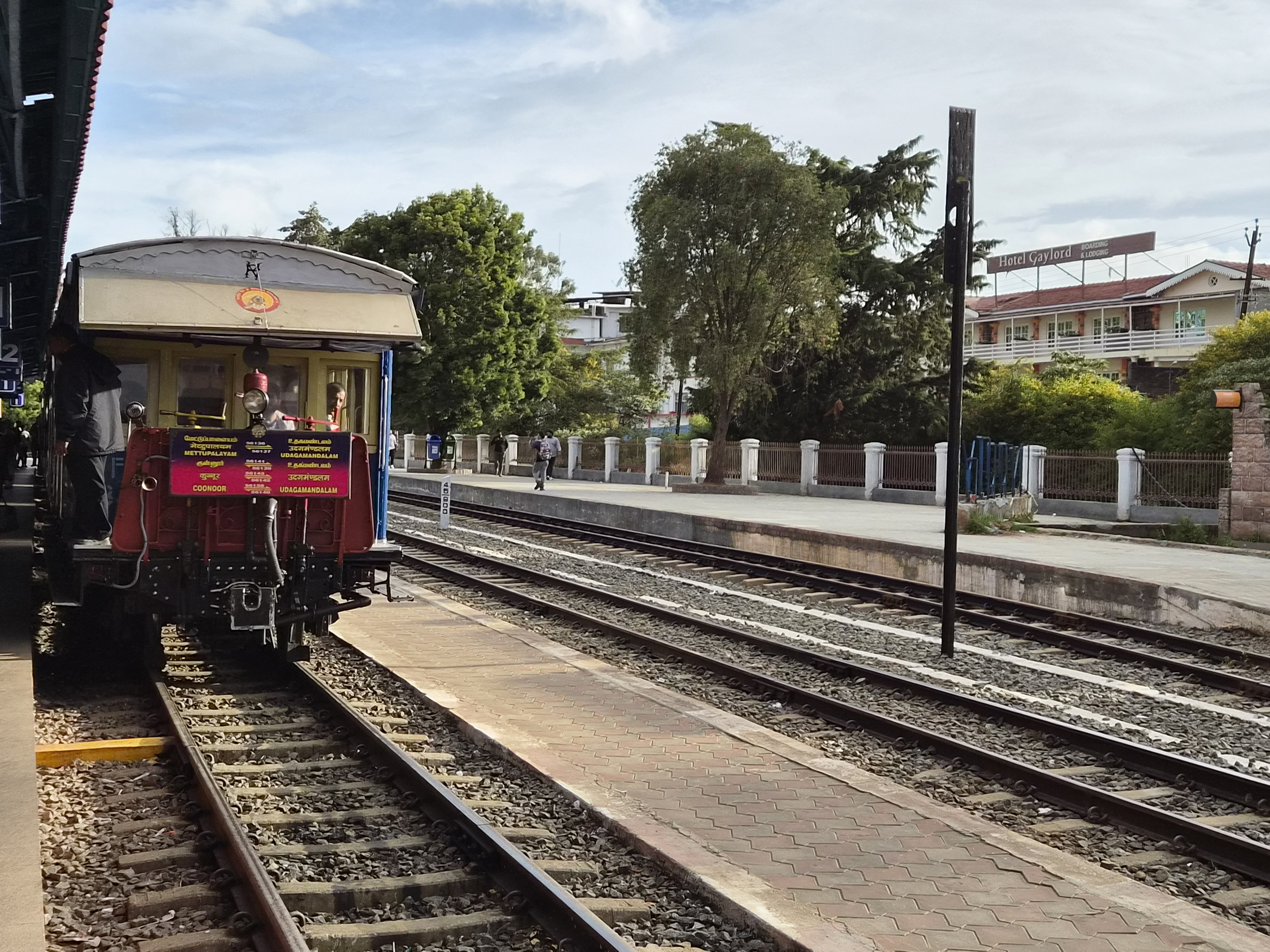
Connor to Udagamandalam passenger train

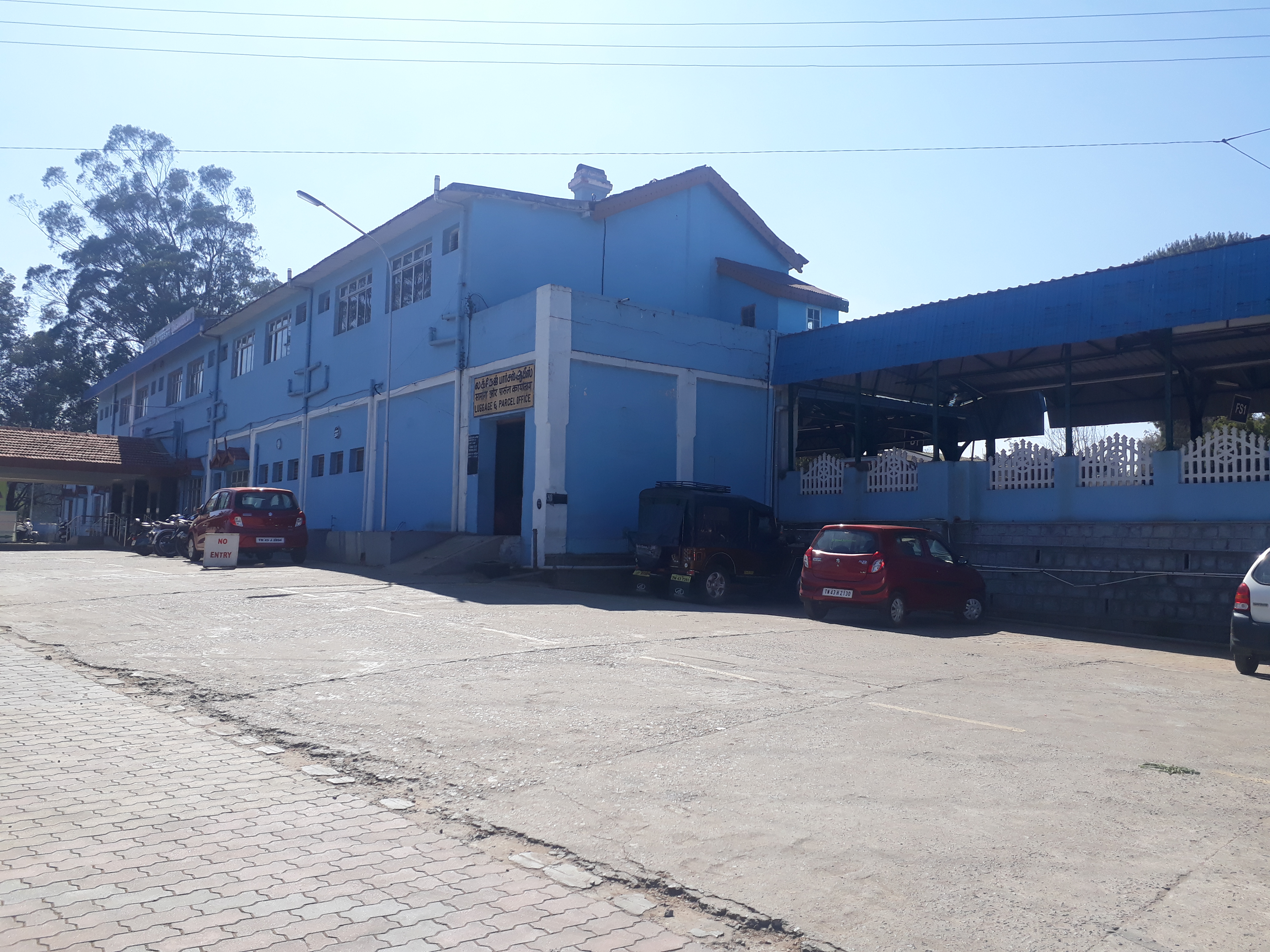
Udagamandalam railway station year 2018

== See also ==
- Nilgiri Mountain Railway
- Kalka–Shimla railway
