= Karaikal railway station =

Railway terminus in Karaikal, Puducherry, India

Karaikal
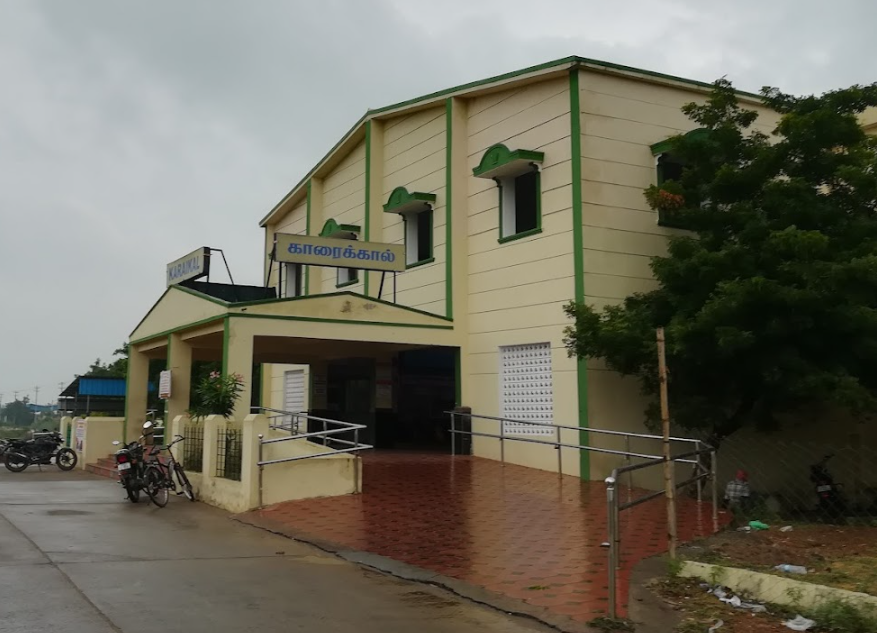
- The Karaikal station entrance

General information
- Location: Railway station road, Karaikal
- Coordinates: 10.932701°N 79.831853°E
- Elevation: 4 metres (13 ft)
- System: Indian Railways station
- Owner: Ministry of Railways (India)
- Operator: Indian Railways
- Platforms: 3
- Tracks: 3
- Connections: Taxi stand, Auto rickshaw stand

Construction
- Structure type: Standard (on-ground station)
- Parking: Available
- Cycle facilities: Available
- Accessible: Disabled access

Other information
- Status: Functioning
- Station code: KIK
- Zone(s): Southern Railway zone
- Division(s): Tiruchirappalli

History
- Rebuilt: No
Location

Karaikal railway station (station code: KIK) is an NSG–4 category Indian railway station in Tiruchirappalli railway division of Southern Railway zone. It is a railway terminus, situated in the city of Karaikal in the Union Territory of Puducherry, India. The station is 145 kilometres (90 mi) east of Tiruchirappalli and 300 kilometres (190 mi) from Chennai and connects Karaikal to various parts of the country.

== Location and layout ==
The railway station is located on Railway station road off the East Coast Road (ECR) and the Karaikal Bypass Road. The Karaikal Bus Station is located 3 kilometres (1.9 mi) away. The nearest airport is Tiruchirappalli International Airport, situated at about 130 kilometres (81 mi) away from the station. Karaikal Port is located 11 kilometres (6.8 mi) from Karaikal railway station.

== Peralam–Karaikal line ==
Currently the station is the terminal point on the Tiruchirapalli–Karaikal branch line and has three platforms. Until 1987 there was a 23 km metre-gauge branch line westwards, connecting Karaikal with Peralam, which was later dismantled. Since then there have been persistent demands from various quarters for the revival of this line. In June 2019 tenders were floated for the restoration of this route, expecting to complete the project by March 2024.

== Operations ==
=== Express trains ===
No.	Train no.	Origin	Train name
1.	16175/16176	Chennai Egmore	Chennai Egmore–Karaikal Kamban Express
2.	16187/16188	Ernakulam Junction	Tea Garden Express
3.	11017/11018	Lokmanya Tilak Terminus Mumbai	Lokmanya Tilak Terminus–Karaikal Weekly Express

=== List of passenger trains ===
No.	Train no.	Origin	Train name
1.	56513/56514	Bengaluru City	(Electronics City) Fast Passenger
2.	56711/76851; 56714/76854	Tiruchirappalli Junction	Passenger
3.	06851/06852	Nagore	DEMU Special Passenger
4.	76812/76815	Thanjavur Junction	DEMU Passenger
5.	76813/76818	Velankanni	DEMU Passenger
