= Velankanni railway station =

Train station in Velankanni, India

Velankanni
- Station building

General information
- Location: Velankanni, Nagapattinam district, Tamil Nadu; India
- Coordinates: 10.6869°N 79.8440°E
- Elevation: 2 metres (6 ft 7 in)
- System: Regional rail and Light rail station
- Owner: Ministry of Railways (India)
- Operator: Indian Railways
- Line: Nagapattinam Junction railway station - Karaikal railway station
- Platforms: 3
- Tracks: 5
- Connections: Bus stand, taxicab stand, auto rickshaw stand

Construction
- Structure type: Standard (on-ground station)
- Parking: Yes
- Accessible: Disabled access

Other information
- Status: Active
- Station code: VLNK
- Zone(s): Southern Railway zone
- Division(s): Tiruchirappalli

History
- Opened: 2010; 16 years ago
- Electrified: 25 kV AC 50 Hz
Route map
Location
- Location within Tamil Nadu Location within India

Velankanni railway station (station code: VLNK) is an NSG–5 category Indian railway station in Tiruchirappalli railway division of Southern Railway zone. It is a terminal station in Velankanni town in the Indian state of Tamil Nadu.

== Jurisdiction ==
It belongs to the Tiruchirappalli railway division of the Southern Railway zone in Nagapattinam district in Tamil Nadu.

== About ==
It lies at the end of a 10 kilometres (6.2 mi) long Nagapattinam–Velankanni broad-gauge line. The foundation stone of the line was laid in 1999 and it was completed in 2010 at a cost of ₹48 crore (US$5.1 million). The station belongs to the Tiruchirappalli railway division of Southern Railway zone.

== Trains ==
No.	Train no.	Origin	Train name
1.	16361/16362	Ernakulam Jn, Kerala	Ernakulam Jn - Velankanni Bi Weekly Express
2.	17315/16	Vasco da Gama, Goa	Vasco da Gama – Velankanni Weekly Express
3.	06833/34	Nagapattinam	Nagapattinam - Velankani DEMU Express Special
4.	06841/42	Nagapattinam	Nagapattinam - Velankani DEMU Express Special
5.	06733/34	Karaikal, Puducherry	Karaikal - Velankanni DEMU Express Special
6.	06840	Tiruchirappalli Jn	Tiruchchirappalli Jn - Velankanni DEMU Express Special

== See also ==
- Velankanni
- Indian Railways
- Basilica of Our Lady of Good Health
