= Nagapattinam Junction railway station =

Railway station in Tamil Nadu, India

Nagapattinam Junction Nagai Junction
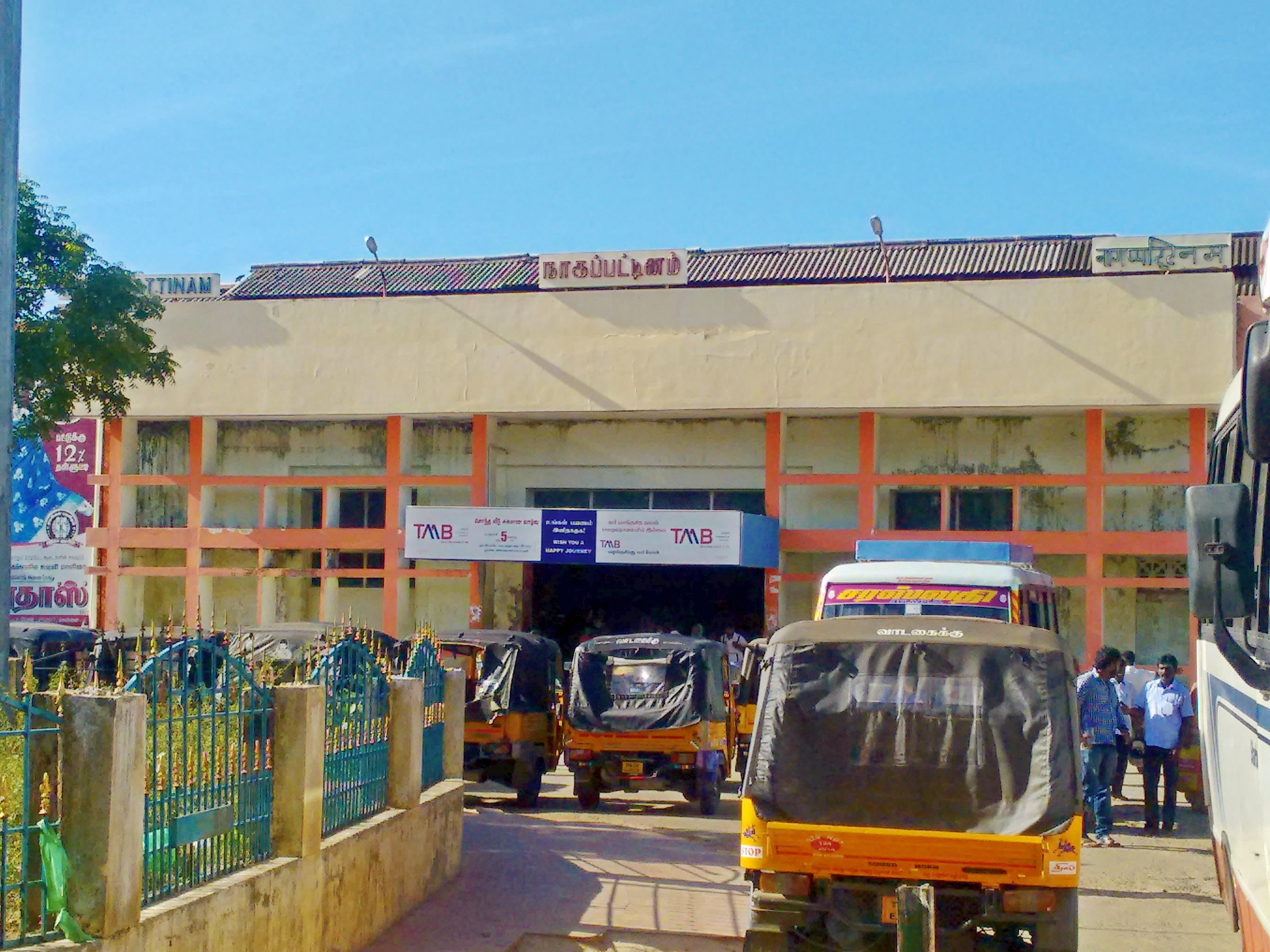

General information
- Location: old bus stand road, Tata Nagar, Nagapattinam Jn, Nagapattinam, Tamil Nadu; India
- Coordinates: 10.7595°N 79.8457°E
- Elevation: 7 m (23 ft)
- System: Indian Railways station
- Owner: Indian Railways
- Operator: Southern Railway zone
- Lines: Tiruchirapalli–Nagapattinam line Velankanni–Karaikal line
- Platforms: 3
- Tracks: 4
- Connections: Bus stand, taxicab stand, auto rickshaw stand

Construction
- Structure type: Standard (on-ground station)
- Parking: Yes
- Accessible: Disabled access

Other information
- Status: Functioning
- Station code: NGT
- Zone(s): Southern Railway zone
- Division(s): Tiruchirapalli

History
- Electrified: 25 kV AC 50 Hz
Route map
Location
- Location within Tamil Nadu

Nagapattinam Junction (station code: NGT) is an NSG–3 category Indian railway station in Tiruchirappalli railway division of Southern Railway zone. It is a junction railway station serving the town of Nagapattinam in Tamil Nadu, India.

== Location and layout ==
The railway station is located off the Nethaji Road, Tata Nagar, of Nagapattinam. The nearest bus depot is located in Nagapattinam while the nearest airport is situated 110 kilometres (68 mi) away in Tiruchirappalli.

== Lines ==
The station is connected via branch line to historic main line that connects Chennai with places like Tiruchirappalli Jn, Thanjavur Jn, Thiruvarur Jn, Rameswaram, etc. An additional line branches out north-bound to Karaikal via Nagore.

- BG Electrified single line towards Thanjavur junction
- BG Electrified single line towards Karaikal
- BG single line towards Velankanni.
