= Thiruvarur Junction railway station =

Railway station in Tamil Nadu

Thiruvarur Junction
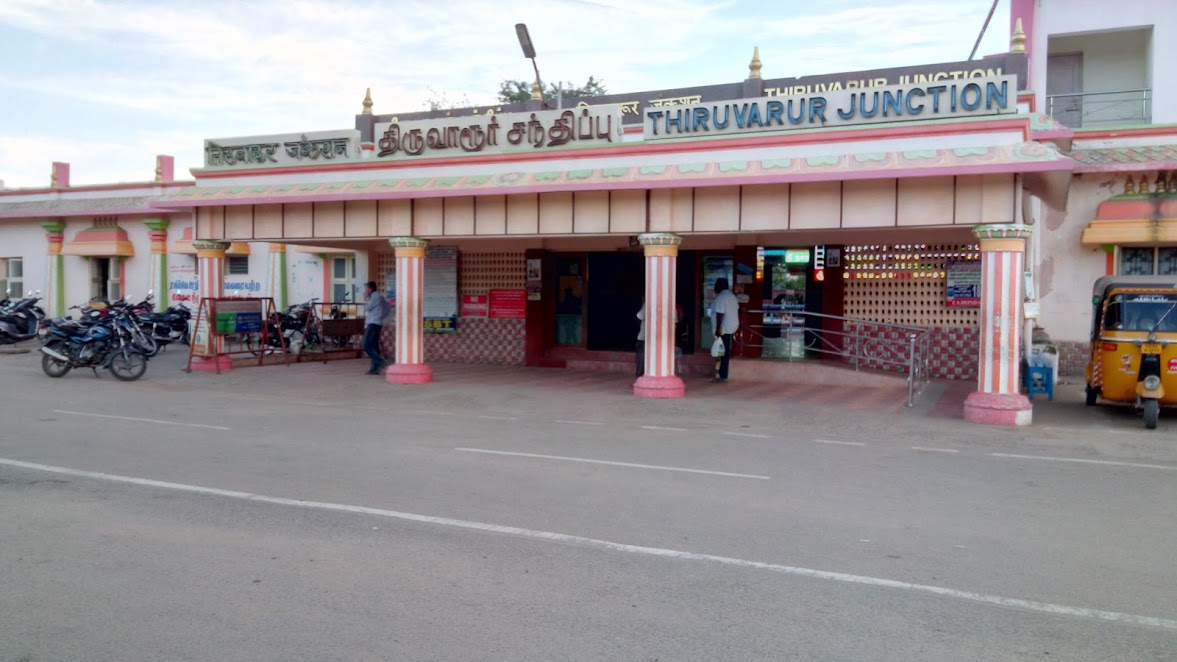
- Thiruvarur Junction entrance

General information
- Location: Panagal road, Thiruvarur, Thiruvarur district, Tamil Nadu; India
- Coordinates: 10.7648°N 79.6338°E
- Elevation: 13 m (43 ft)
- System: Indian Railways station
- Owner: Indian Railways
- Operator: Southern Railway zone
- Lines: Thiruvarur–Karaikkudi line Thiruvarur–Thanjavur line Thiruvarur–Nagapattinam–Karaikal line Thiruvarur–Mayiladuthurai (branch line)
- Platforms: 5
- Tracks: 7
- Connections: Bus stand, taxicab stand, Auto rickshaw stand

Construction
- Structure type: At-grade
- Parking: Yes
- Accessible: Disabled access

Other information
- Status: Functioning
- Station code: TVR
- Zone(s): Southern Railway zone
- Division(s): Tiruchirapalli

History
- Electrified: 25 kV AC 50 Hz
Route map
Location
- Location within Tamil Nadu

Thiruvarur Junction (station code: TVR) is an NSG–5 category Indian railway station in Tiruchirappalli railway division of Southern Railway zone. It is a junction railway station serving Thiruvarur town, headquarters of Thiruvarur district in Tamil Nadu in India and a focal point on the branch line connecting trains from Chennai to Nagapattinam–Velankanni–Nagore–Karaikal on one line and Karaikkudi–Sivganga–Manamadurai–Rameswaram on the second line and Tiruchirappalli–Thanjavur–Thiruvarur–Nagapattinam–Karaikal on the third line and Mayiladuthurai–Thiruvarur on the fourth line that branches out of the station.(I.e the station is situated between mayiladuthurai to Karaikudi section of TPJ divn)The station is a part of the Trichy railway division one of the 6 divisions of the Southern Railway zone.

== History ==
In 1861, the Great Southern of India Railway (GSIR) built the 125 km (78 mi)-long 1,676 mm (5 ft 6 in)-wide line between Nagapattinam and Tiruchirappali (then known as Trichinopoly) via Thiruvarur, Nidamangalam, Thanjavur and the line was opened to traffic next year. It was a new development south of Chennai. After taking over GSIR by South Indian Railway Company in 1874, the Nagapattinam–Tiruchirappalli line was converted to 1,000 mm (3 ft 3 3/8 in)-wide metre gauge in 1875.

== Location and layout ==
The Thiruvarur Junction is situated on the Panagal Road which is sandwiched between the Netaji Road and the Coimbatore–Nagapattinam National Highway 83, the two arterial thoroughfares of the town.

On the Panagal Road is also located the Thiruvarur Bus Depot where buses to Mannargudi, Thiruthuraipoondi, Nagapattinam, Velankanni, Karaikal, Mayiladuthurai, Thanjavur, Kumbakonam and several nearby destinations are available.

The nearest airport is the Tiruchirappalli International Airport some 105 km away from the station. The next nearest train stations are Mankudi (south), Kulikarai (west), Adiyakkamangalam (east) and Vijayapuram (north).

The station has 5 platforms and over 7 tracks in broad gauge.

The station is converted into electrified. (Current processing)

== Lines ==
There are 4 lines that branch out of the station:

- BG single line (branch of the main line) towards Chennai via Villupuram Jn, Mayiladuthurai Jn.
- BG single line to Velankanni, Nagapattinam Jn, Nagore and Karaikal.
- BG single line to Tiruchirapalli Jn via Thanjavur Jn and Nidamangalam Jn.
- BG single line to KaraikudiJn via Thiruthuraipoondi Jn, Thiruvarur. Gauge conversion completed between Thiruvarur Jn and Karaikudi Jn is in progress and there is only partial connectivity in the segment connecting Pattukottai and Karaikudi Jn. Speed test between Pattukottai to Thiruvarur Jn in via Thiruthuraipoondi Jn in new BG line speed up to 120 km/h.

Thiruvarur to Karaikkudi via Thiruthuraipoondi Passenger train starts 1 June 2019

== Electrification ==
New electrification survey in 2012–13 had been sanctioned in the Railway Budget for the Karaikal/Karaikal port–Thiruvarur Jn–Thanjavur–Tiruchirappalli and Nagapattinam–Velankanni sectors.

== Gauge conversion ==
After conversion work of the Thanjavur–Thiruvarur broad-gauge section was opened to traffic in 2006 and Thiruvarur–Nagapattinam–Nagore section in 2010.
Gauge conversion between Thiruvarur Junction railway station and Karaikudi Junction railway station is completed in progress and there is only partial connectivity in the segment connecting Pattukottai, Thiruthuraupoondi Junction railway station and Karaikudi Junction.

== Projects and development ==
It is one of the 73 stations in Tamil Nadu to be named for upgradation under Amrit Bharat Station Scheme of Indian Railways.
