= Southern Railway zone =

Railway zone of Indian Railways

Southern Railway

Overview
- Main region: South India
- Stations called at: 727
- Headquarters: Chennai
- Reporting mark: SR
- Locale: Tamil Nadu, parts of Kerala, Southern parts of Andhra Pradesh & Puducherry,
- Dates of operation: 14 April 1950; 76 years ago–
- Predecessor: South Indian Railway; Madras and Southern Mahratta Railway; Mysore State Railway; Pondicherry Railway Company
- Successor: Southern Railway; South Coast Railway; South Central Railway; South Western Railway

Technical
- Track gauge: Broad gauge Metre gauge
- Previous gauge: Narrow gauge
- Electrification: 25 kV AC
- Length: 5,081 km (3,157 mi) route
- No. of tracks: 9 (main lines)
- Operating speed: 130 km/h (81 mph)

Other
- Website: Southern Railway

Southern Railway (abbreviated SR) is one of the 19 zones of Indian Railways. It is headquartered at Chennai and operates across the states of Tamil Nadu, Kerala, Andhra Pradesh and the union territory of Puducherry. It maintains about 5,081 km (3,157 mi) of railway lines and operates 727 railway stations. With effect from 1 October 2026, the Mangaluru railway area upto Ullal in Karnataka was transferred from Palakkad railway division of Southern railway zone to Mysore railway division of South Western Railway zone as per Railway Board notification dated 21 August 2026.

The origin of the Southern Railway can be traced back to the mid-19th century. In 1835, the first railway track in India was constructed in Madras and became operational in 1837. The Madras Railway was formally established later in 1845. The Southern Railway was created on 14 April 1950 by merging three state railways, namely, the Madras and Southern Mahratta Railway, the South Indian Railway Company, and the Mysore State Railway and became the first railway zone of the Indian Railways.

== History ==
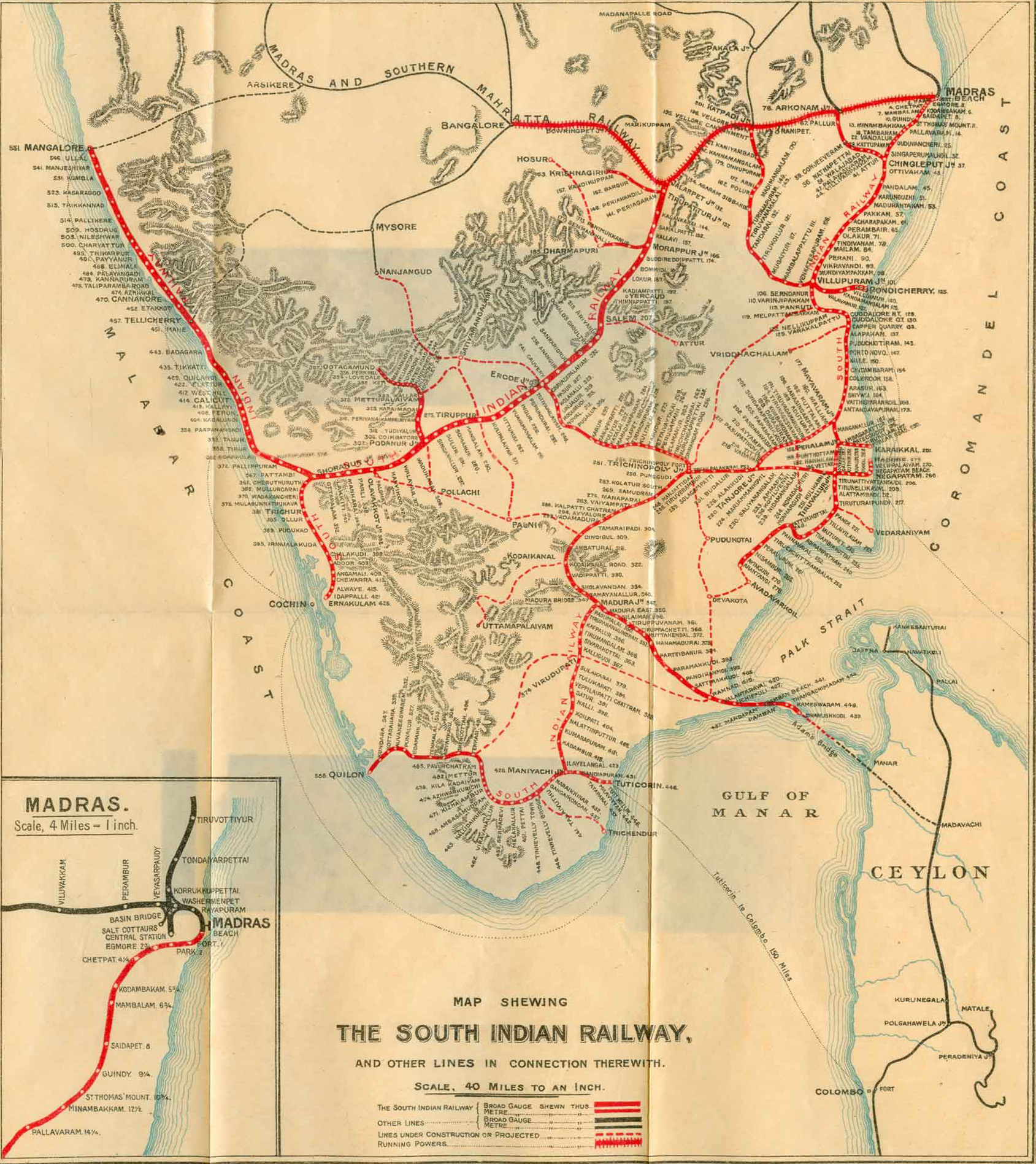
Map of South Indian Railway in 1910

The history of the Southern Railway can be traced back to the Madras Railway. In 1832, the proposal to construct the first railway line in India at Madras was made by the British. In 1835, the railway track was constructed between Little Mount and Chintadripet in Madras and became operational in 1837. The Madras Railway was established later in 1845 and the construction on the first main line between Madras and Arcot started in 1853, which became operational in 1856. In 1908, Madras Railway merged with Southern Mahratta Railway to form the Madras and Southern Mahratta Railway.

In 1944, all the railway companies operating in British India were taken over by the Government. Post Independence, various re-grouping proposals were studied as there were 42 different railway systems. In December 1950, the Central Advisory Committee for Railways approved the plan for Indian Railways into six zonal systems and the Southern Railway zone was created on 14 April 1950 by merging three state railways, namely, the Madras and Southern Mahratta Railway, the South Indian Railway Company, and the Mysore State Railway.

== Organisation ==
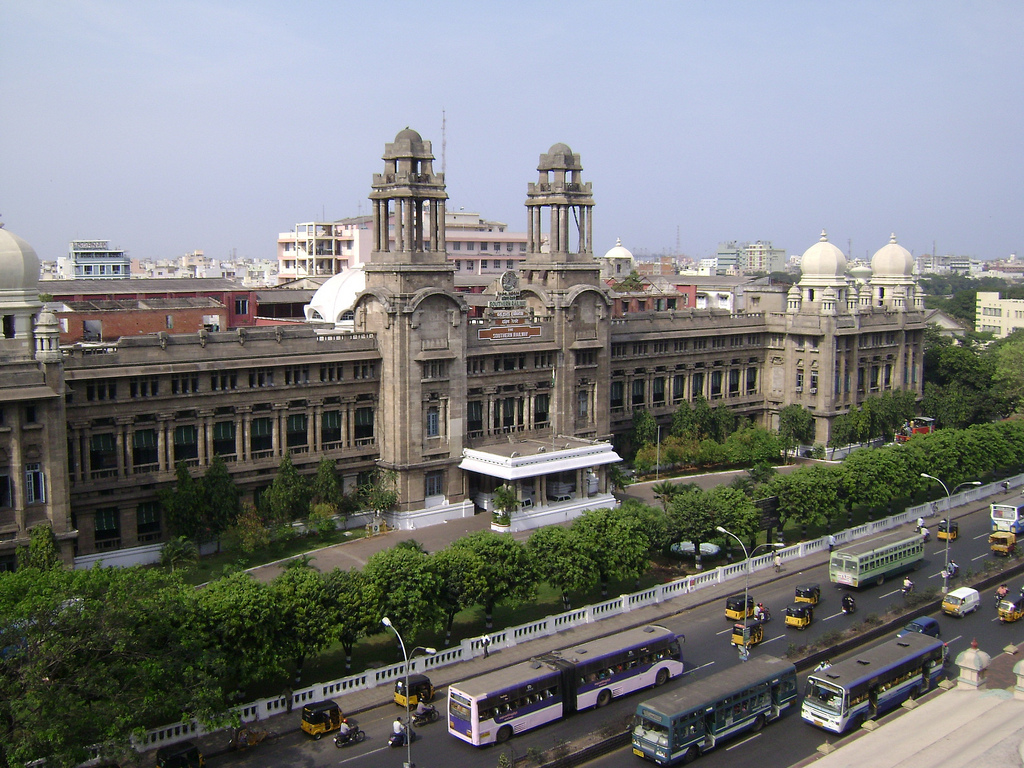
Southern Railway headquarters in Chennai

Southern Railway zone covers the states of Tamil Nadu, Kerala, Puducherry and a small portion of Andhra Pradesh. Andaman and Nicobar will form part of the zone once the proposed new railway line between Port Blair and Diglipur becomes operational.

The Southern Railway is headed by the General Manager, assisted by an Additional General Manager. Southern Railway is headquartered in Chennai and is divided into six divisions namely Chennai, Tiruchirappalli, Madurai, Palakkad, Salem and Thiruvananthapuram.

Name of Division	Established	Headquarters	Comments
Vijayawada	6-May-1956	Vijayawada	Moved to SCR in 1966 and later to SCoR in 2026
Madurai	6-May-1956	Madurai	
Tiruchirappalli	6-May-1956	Tiruchirappalli	
Podanur	14-April-1951	Podanur	Closed in the year 1956 and the Headquarters shifted to Olavacode (Palakkad).
Madras	1-August-1956	Chennai	
Palakkad	4-August-1956	Palakkad	previously known as Olavacode (former name of palakkad). Formed from Podanur division.
Guntakal	10-October-1956	Guntakal	Moved to SCR in 1977 and later to SCoR in 2026
Mysore	31-October-1956	Mysuru	Moved to SWR in 2003
Hubli	31-October-1956	Hubballi	Moved to SCR in 1966 and later to SWR in 2003
Bangalore	31-October-1971	Bengaluru	Moved to SWR in 2003
Thiruvananthapuram	2-October-1979	Thiruvananthapuram	Formed from Madurai division.
Salem	14-November-2001	Salem	Formed from Palakkad division.

== Operations and infrastructure ==
The zone operates both passenger and freight trains. Various classes of passenger trains including Vande Bharat Express, Amrit Bharat Express, Shatabdi Express, Antyodaya Express, Double Decker Express and Tejas Express are operated by Southern Railways. Freight operations include container traffic from the ports, coal bound to the thermal power stations, oil and petroleum products from refineries, cement and food grains. Most of the lines inside ports, thermal stations, manufacturing industries and owned by the respective companies and the zone provides a link connecting to its network along with the wagons and locomotives. The zone has a larger proportion of passenger traffic compared to freight. There are about 727 stations on the Southern railway network.

=== Locomotives ===
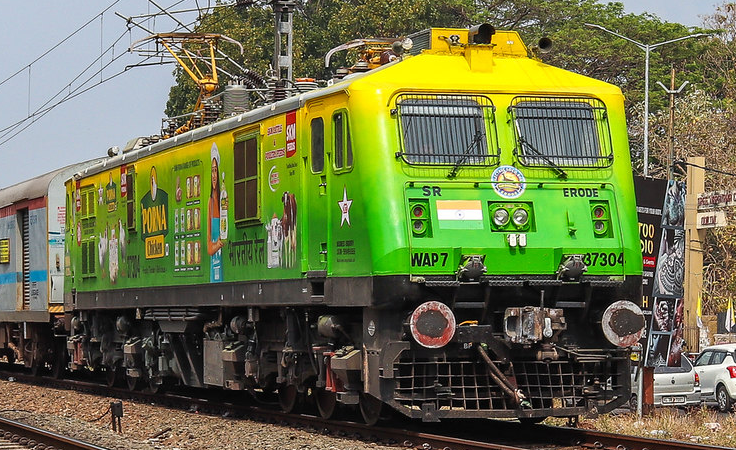
A Erode WAP-7 locomotive of Southern Railway

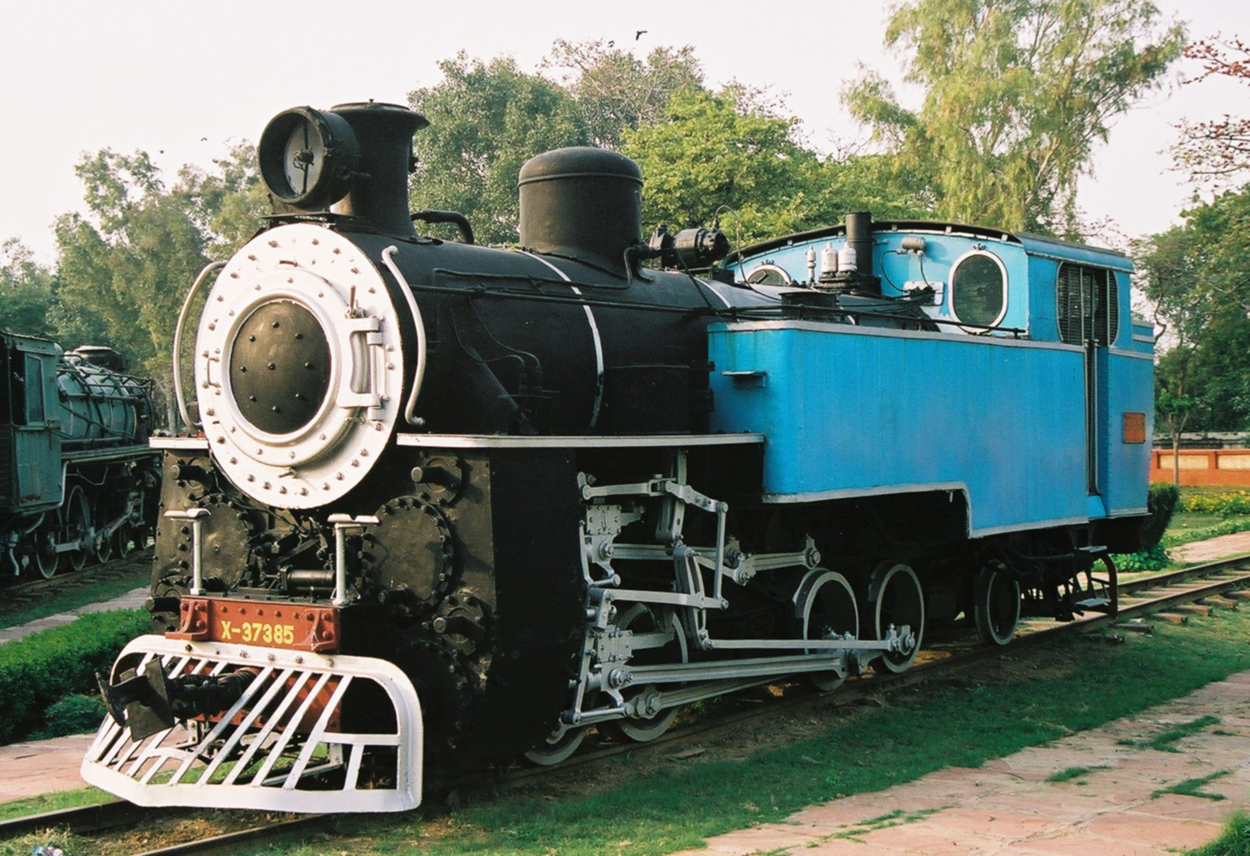
A X class locomotive of the Nilgiri Mountain Railway

Southern Railway utilizes various classes of electric and diesel locomotives to haul the trains. Steam locomotives are used by the Nilgiri Mountain Railway. The zone has three electric locomotive sheds and four diesel locomotive sheds.

Name	Location	Type	Locomotive class	Count
Electric Loco Shed, Arakkonam	Arakkonam	Electric	WAP-4, WAG-5, WAG-9	224
Electric Loco Shed, Erode	Erode	Electric	WAP-4, WAP-7, WAG-7	223
Electric Loco Shed, Royapuram	Chennai	Electric	WAP-5, WAP-7	130
Diesel Loco Shed, Ernakulam	Ernakulam	Diesel/Electric	WDM-3A, WDG-3A, WDM-3D, WDG-4, WDG-4D, WAG-5	57
Diesel Loco Shed, Erode	Erode	Electric	WAP-1, WAP-4, WAG-5, WAG-7	169
Diesel Loco Shed, Golden Rock	Tiruchirappalli	Diesel	WDG-3A, WDM-3D, WDP-4B/4D, WDG-4/4D, YDM-4, WDS-6, WDM-7	152
Diesel Loco Shed, Tondiarpet	Chennai	Diesel	WDM-3A, WDG-3A, WDS-6, WDG-4, WDG-4D	55
Coonoor Loco Shed, Coonoor	Coonoor	Steam, Diesel	X Class, YDM-4	

=== Maintenance and workshops ===
Southern Railway maintains wagon and locomotive workshops at Perambur, Chennai and Ponmalai, Tiruchirapalli, engineering workshop at Arakkonam, carriage maintenance workshops at Basin Bridge and Egmore and a signal and telecommunication workshop at Podanur, Coimbatore. It has three EMU car sheds in Chennai at Avadi, Tambaram, Velachery and MEMU sheds at Kollam and Palakkad. Southern Railway maintains trip sheds at Basin Bridge, Egmore, Tondiarpet and Jolarpettai. Southern Railway operated ticket printing presses at Royapuram, Thiruvananthapuram and Tiruchirappalli, but these have been phased out due to digitization.

=== Railway coaches and wagons ===
Southern Railways uses both ICF coaches and LHB coaches for its trains. ICF coaches manufactured by the Integral Coach Factory in Chennai have been used predominantly for over sixty years since the formation of the zone in 1951. The ICF coaches are slowly being replaced by newer LHB rakes which provide better passenger comfort and safety.

=== Railway lines ===
Following are the list of railway lines operational.

Line	Start	End	Type	Gauge	Electrified	No. of Lines	Speed limit	Length	Major stations
Chennai Central-Jolarpettai	Chennai Central	Jolarpettai	Main	Broad	Yes	2 (4 till Arakkonam)		213 km (132 mi)	Arakkonam
Chennai Central-Renigunta	Chennai Central	Renigunta	Main	Broad	Yes	2 (4 till Arakkonam)	130 km/h (81 mph)	135 km (84 mi)	Arakkonam
Chennai Central-Gudur	Chennai Central	Gudur	Main	Broad	Yes	2	130 km/h (81 mph)	136 km (85 mi)	Sullurupeta
Jolarpettai–Shoranur	Jolarpettai	Shoranur	Main	Broad	Yes	2		366 km (227 mi)	Salem, Erode, Coimbatore, Coimbatore North, Podanur, Palakkad
Shoranur-Mangalore (excl) railway line	Shoranur	Mangalore	Main	Broad	Yes	2		315 km (196 mi)	Kannur, Kozhikode
Shoranur-Ernakulam line	Shoranur	Cochin Harbour Terminus	Main	Broad	Yes	2		107 km (66 mi)	Thrissur, Aluva, Ernakulam Junction, Ernakulam Town
Chennai Egmore-Thoothukudi	Chennai Egmore	Thoothukudi	Main	Broad	Yes	2 (4 till Chengalpattu)		654 km (406 mi)	Chengalpattu, Villupuram, Virudhachalam, Tiruchirappalli, Dindigul, Madurai, Virudhunagar, Vanchi
Tiruchirappalli-Thanjavur	Tiruchirappalli	Thanjavur	Branch	Broad	Yes	2		50 km (31 mi)	
Tiruchirappalli-Erode	Tiruchirappalli	Erode	Branch	Broad	Yes	1		141 km (88 mi)	Karur
Salem-Dindigul	Salem	Dindigul	Branch	Broad	Yes	1		159 km (99 mi)	Karur
Madurai-Rameswaram	Madurai	Rameswaram	Branch	Broad	Yes	1		173.82 km (108.01 mi)	Manamadurai
Tiruchirappalli-Sengottai	Tiruchirappalli	Sengottai	Branch	Broad	Yes	1		320 km (200 mi)	Karaikudi, Manamadurai, Virudhunagar
Vanchi Maniyachchi-Tirunelveli	Vanchi Maniyachchi	Tirunelveli	Branch	Broad	Yes	2		28.9 km (18.0 mi)	
Tiruchirappalli-Thanjavur	Tiruchirappalli	Thanjavur	Branch	Broad	Yes	2		50 km (31 mi)	
Coimbatore North-Mettupalayam	Coimbatore North	Mettupalayam	Branch	Broad	Yes	1		32.8 km (20.4 mi)	
Nilgiri Mountain Railway	Mettupalayam	Udhagamandalam	Branch	Metre	No	1		45.9 km (28.5 mi)	Coonoor
Thrissur-Guruvayur line	Thrissur	Guruvayur	Branch	Broad	Yes	1		22.6 km (14.0 mi)	
Shoranur -Nilambur line	Shoranur	Nilambur Road	Branch	Broad	Yes	1		65.8 km (40.9 mi)	
Ernakulam–Kayamkulam coastal line	Ernakulam	Kayamkulam	Branch	Broad	Yes	1		100.34 km (62.35 mi)	Alappuzha
Ernakulam–Kottayam–Kayamkulam line	Ernakulam	Kayamkulam	Branch	Broad	Yes	2		156 km (97 mi)	Kottayam, Chengannur
Kollam-Sengottai line	Kollam	Sengottai	Branch	Broad	Yes	1		94 km (58 mi)	
Kollam-Thiruvananthapuram line	Kollam	Thiruvanathapuram Central	Main	Broad	Yes	2		65 km (40 mi)	Kochuveli
Thiruvananthapuram–Nagercoil–Kanyakumari line	Thiruvanathapuram Central	Kanniyakumari	Branch	Broad	Yes	1		89 km (55 mi)	Nagercoil
Nagercoil - Tirunelveli	Nagercoil	Tirunelveli	Main	Broad	Yes	2	110 km/h (68 mph)	73 km (45 mi)	
Tirunelveli-Tiruchendur	Tirunelveli	Tiruchendur	Branch	Broad	Yes	1		61.2 km (38.0 mi)	
Tenkasi-Sengottai	Tenkasi	Sengottai	Branch	Broad	Yes	1		8 km (5.0 mi)	
Irugur-Podanur	Irugur	Podanur	Branch	Broad	Yes	1		10.9 km (6.8 mi)	
Dindigul-Pollachi	Dindigul	Pollachi	Branch	Broad	Yes	1		120.7 km (75.0 mi)	Palani
Podanur-Pollachi	Podanur	Pollachi	Branch	Broad	Yes	1		40 km (25 mi)	
Palakkad–Pollachi line	Palakkad	Pollachi	Branch	Broad	Yes	1		57.8 km (35.9 mi)	
Salem-Mettur Dam	Salem	Mettur Dam	Branch	Broad	Yes	2		38.9 km (24.2 mi)	
Salem-Virudhachalam	Salem	Virudhachalam	Branch	Broad	Yes	1		139 km (86 mi)	
Cuddalore-Thanjavur	Cuddalore	Thanjavur	Branch	Broad	Yes	1		146 km (91 mi)	Mayiladuthurai
Cuddalore-Virudhachalam	Cuddalore	Virudhachalam	Branch	Broad	Yes	1		57 km (35 mi)	
Villupuram-Puducherry	Villupuram	Puducherry	Branch	Broad	Yes	1		37.6 km (23.4 mi)	
Villupuram-Katpadi	Villupuram	Katpadi	Branch	Broad	Yes	1		161 km (100 mi)	Tiruvannamalai
Thanjavur-Karaikal	Thanjavur	Karaikal	Branch	Broad	Yes	1		95.4 km (59.3 mi)	Nagapattinam
Mayiladuthurai-Thiruvarur	Mayiladuthurai	Thiruvarur	Branch	Broad	Yes	1		39 km (24 mi)	
Arakkonam-Chengalpattu	Arakkonam	Chengalpattu	Branch	Broad	Yes	1		68 km (42 mi)	
Nagapattinam-Velankanni	Nagapattinam	Velankanni	Branch	Broad	Yes	1		10.4 km (6.5 mi)	
Madurai-Bodinayakkanur	Madurai	Bodinayakkanur	Branch	Broad	Yes	1		88 km (55 mi)	
Thiruvarur-Tiruturaipundi	Thiruvarur	Tiruturaipundi	Branch	Broad	No	1		26 km (16 mi)	
Karaikkudi-Tiruturaipundi	Karaikkudi	Tiruturaipundi	Branch	Broad	No	1		149 km (93 mi)	
Tiruturaipundi-Agastiyampalli	Tiruturaipundi	Agastiyampalli	Branch	Broad	No	1		36.8 km (22.9 mi)	

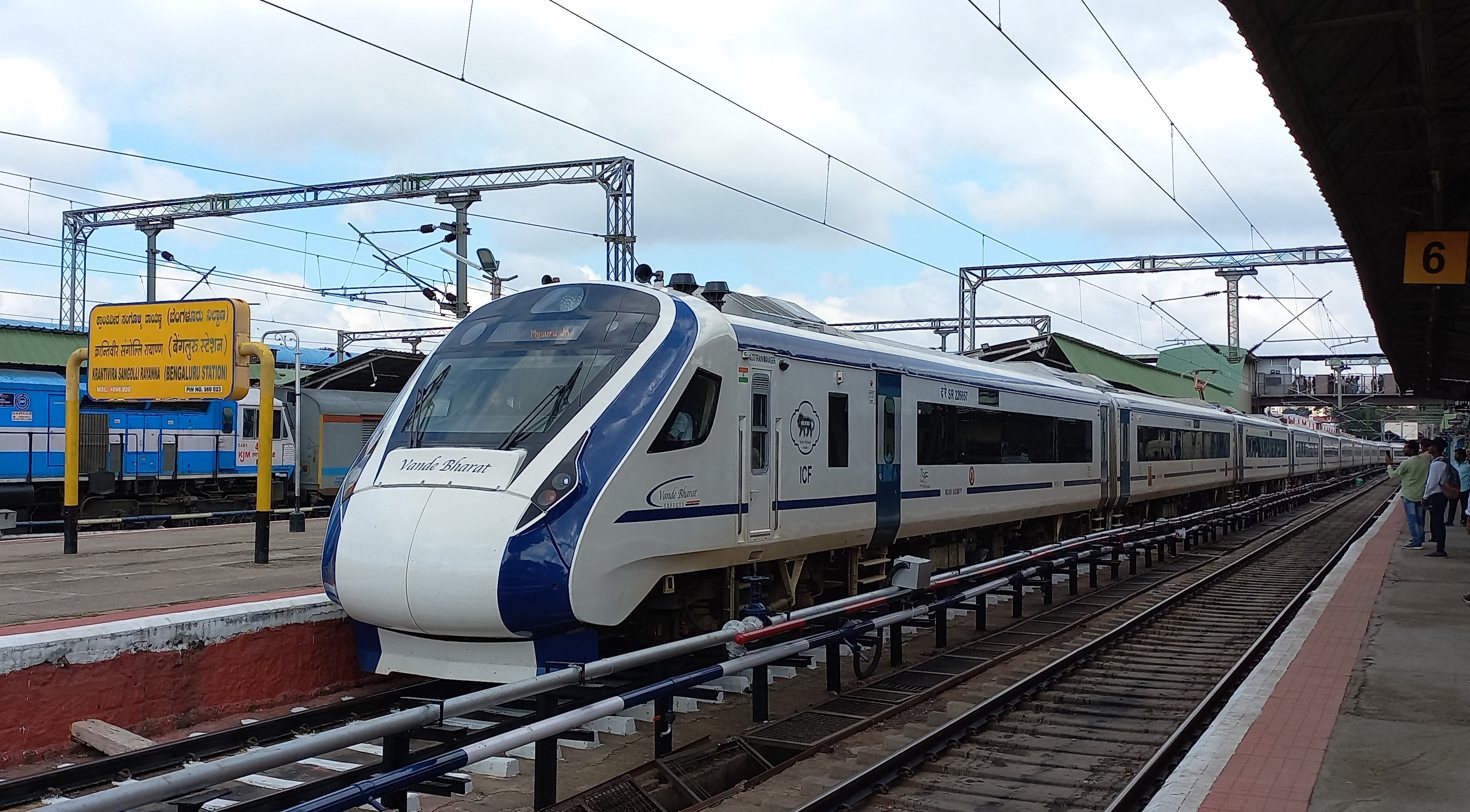
Chennai-Mysore Vande Bharat Express

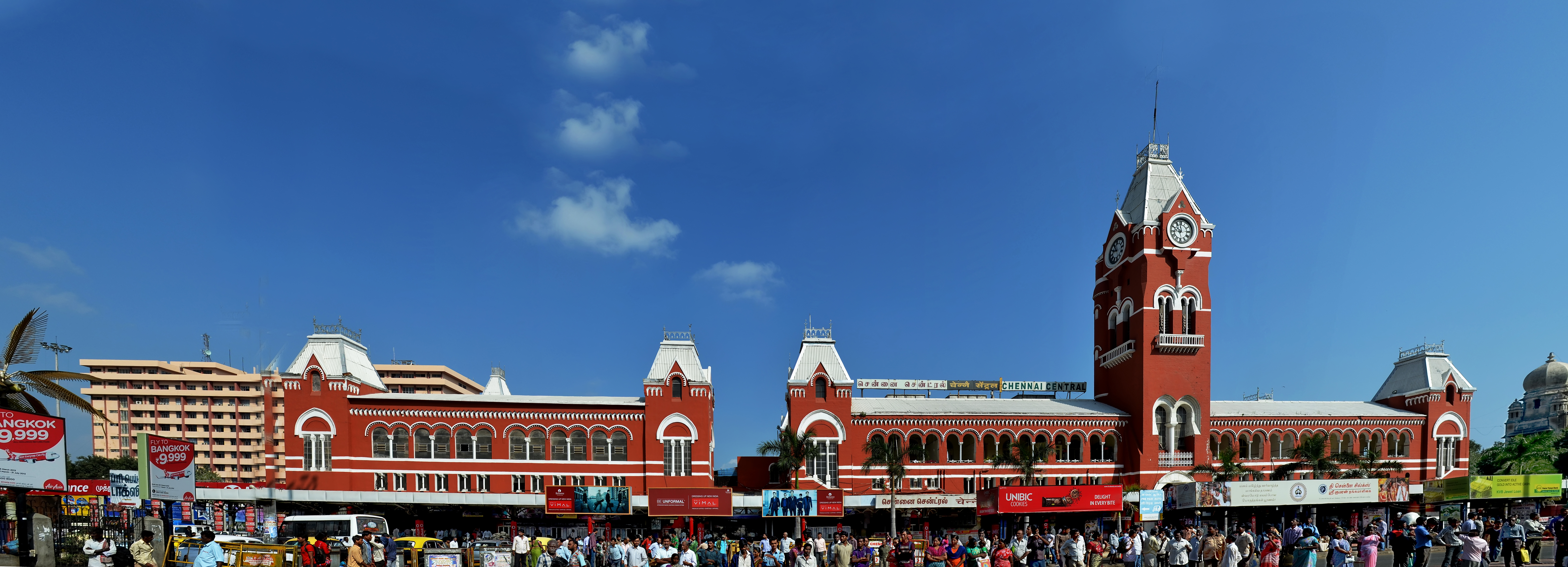
Chennai Central, the busiest station of Southern railway

Defunct railway lines include Kundala Valley Railways, Kochin Tramways, Madras Tramways, Tiruchendur Light Railway, Dharmapuri and Krishnagiri famine light railways, Kodaikanal Light Railway.

=== Trains ===
Southern Railways operates 41 sets of express trains and 97 sets of superfast trains. The superfast trains include: Vande Bharat Express (10), Shatabdi Express (2), Garib Rath Express (2), Duronto Express (1), Jan Shatabdi Express (4), Sampark Kranti Express (1), Anuvrat Express (1), Humsafar Express (1), Tejas Express (1), Uday Express (1), Antyodaya Express (2) and Double Decker Express (1). Apart from this, it operates various Passenger trains, DEMU, EMU services, Chennai Suburban and the Nilgiri Mountain Railway.

=== Stations ===
There are about 727 stations on the Southern railway network, including 486 non suburban stations, 74 suburban stations and 166 halt stations. The major and highest revenue earning stations are Chennai Central, Chennai Egmore, Coimbatore Junction, Tambaram, Madurai Junction, Thiruvananthapuram Central and Ernakulam Junction.

== Chennai Suburban ==
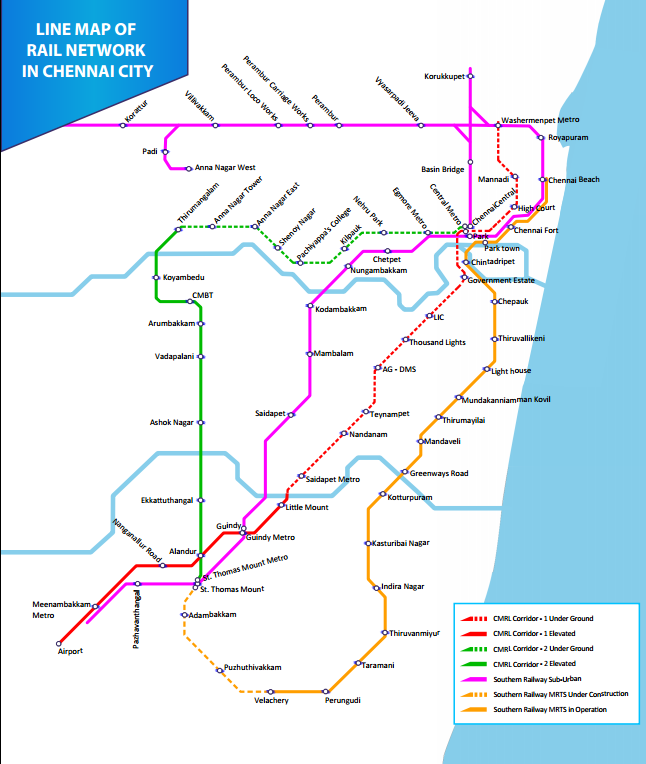
Chennai suburban map

Chennai Suburban Railway is the commuter rail system in the city of Chennai, operated by the Southern Railways. The system operates four lines with a track length of 1,174.21 km (729.62 mi), of which 509.71 km (316.72 mi) are dedicated dual tracks for EMUs. earlier Trams are also operated in Chennai by Madras Electric Tramways.

Line	Start	End	Type	Length	Stations
North Line	Chennai Central Suburban	Sullurpeta via Gumidipoondi	Suburban	82 km (51 mi)	30
South West Line	Chennai Beach	Arakkonam via Mambalam, St. Thomas Mount,Chengalpattu	Suburban	122.7 km (76.2 mi)	50
West Line	Chennai Beach or Chennai Central Suburban	Tiruttani via Thiruvallur,Arakkonam	Suburban	85 km (53 mi)	57
Chennai MRTS	Chennai Beach	St. Thomas Mount via Velacherry	MRTS	24 km (15 mi)	25

== Nilgiri Mountain Railway ==
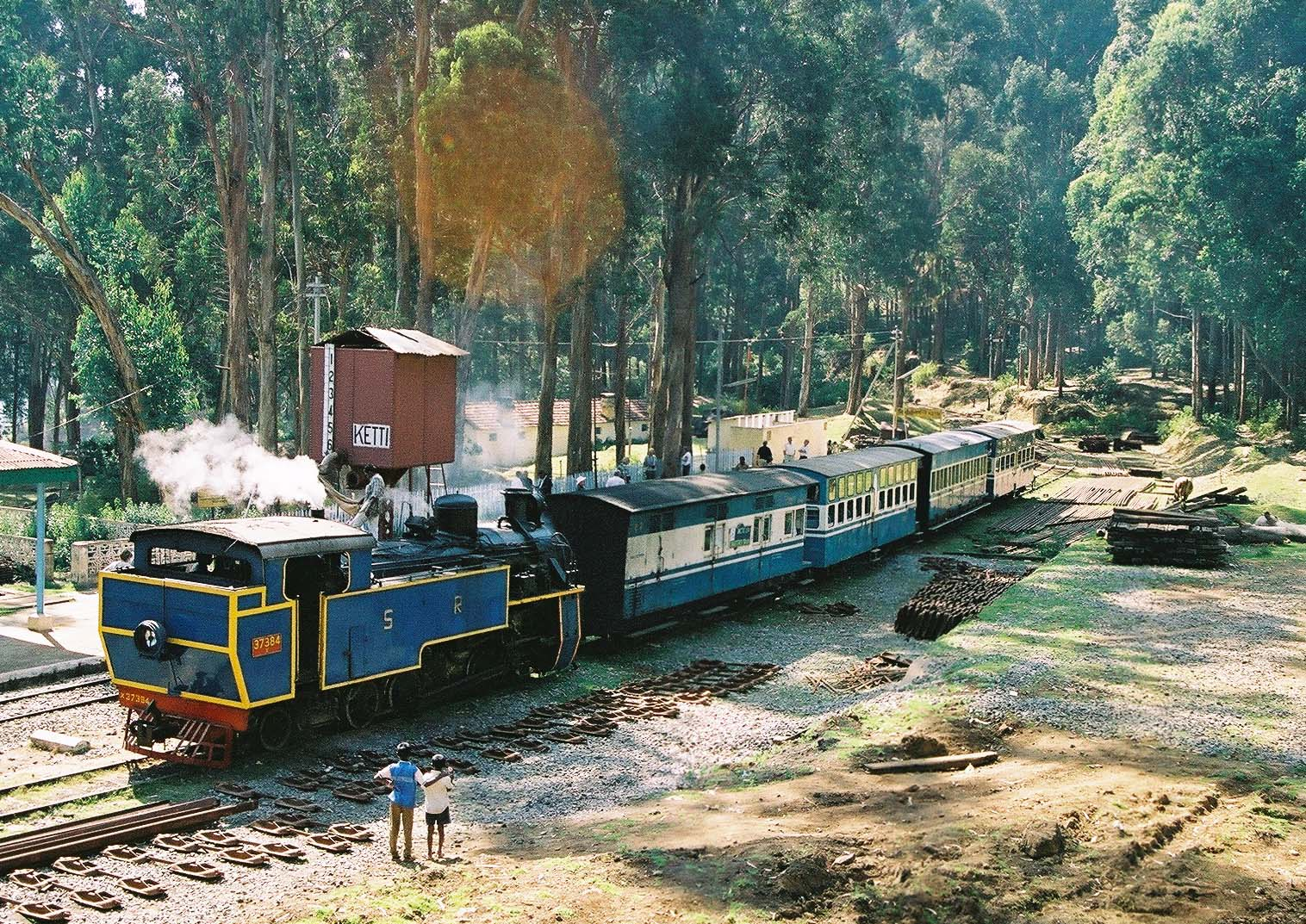
Nilgiri Mountain Railway

Nilgiri Mountain Railway is a 1,000 mm (3 ft 3 3/8 in) metre gauge railway in Nilgiris district connecting Mettupalayam and Udagamandalam. It was built during the British Raj in 1908 and is currently operated by the Southern Railways. It is the only rack railway in India and operates on its own fleet of steam locomotives between Coonoor and Udhagamandalam. In July 2005, UNESCO added the Nilgiri Mountain Railway as an extension to the World Heritage Site of Mountain Railways of India.

== See also ==
- Zones and divisions of Indian Railways
- All India Station Masters' Association (AISMA)
