= Bus stand =

Bus parking location

A bus stand, also called a bus bay, or bus stance, is a designated parking location where a bus or coach waits out of service between scheduled public transport services. 'Bus stand' is also often an alternative name for specific bus stops inside a bus station.

Bus stands are seen at different busy spots, like school or college gates, markets, medical centres and the crossing point(s) of two or more roads. A bus stand is usually employed to allow a bus to lay over at a bus terminus, without giving the appearance of being in service, or blocking the stop from use by other buses that are in service. Bus stands also allow short-term parking for driver changes or driver breaks.

In the simplest case, a bus turnout type of bus stop is extended, and buses can lay over away from the stop if necessary. In locations where buses cannot remain stationary for long, nearby but separate bus stands may be provided where other bus parking is not conveniently located.

Due to their public transport use, bus stands will often be specifically covered by local legislation. Parking of non-public service vehicles (PSVs) in bus stands may be prohibited. For pollution and fuel saving concerns, drivers may be required to switch their engines off if in a bus stand, as opposed to when stopped in a bus stop.

In public bus and coach stations, buses will often be marshalled into specific parking slots, which act as stands where buses queue for an available slot at a departure point, such as in Victoria Coach Station in London. At the appropriate time, the bus can be moved the short distance to the stop, to begin boarding.

== See also ==
- Bus stop
- Layover
