= Chennai Egmore–Guruvayur Express =

Train in India

Overview
- Service type: Express
- Status: Active
- Locale: Tamil Nadu & Kerala
- First service: 18 January 2003; 23 years ago
- Current operator: Southern Railway

Route
- Termini: Chennai Egmore (MS); Guruvayur (GUV)
- Stops: 46
- Distance travelled: 1,111 km (690 mi)
- Average journey time: 22 Hours
- Service frequency: Daily
- Train number: 16127 / 16128
- Lines used: Chord line (MS – TPJ); Tiruchirappalli-Thiruvananthapuram line (TPJ – TVC); Kollam–Thiruvananthapuram trunk line (TVC – QLN); Kollam–Kayamkulam spur line (QLN – KYJ); Ernakulam–Kayamkulam coastal railway line (KYJ – ERS); Shoranur–Cochin Harbour section (ERS – TCR); Guruvayur–Thrissur spur line (TCR – GUV)

On-board services
- Classes: AC 2 Tier, AC 3 Tier, Sleeper Class, General Unreserved, Second sitting
- Disabled access: Disabled access
- Seating arrangements: Yes
- Sleeping arrangements: Yes
- Auto-rack arrangements: Yes
- Catering facilities: On-board catering, E-catering
- Observation facilities: Large windows
- Entertainment facilities: Yes
- Baggage facilities: Available

Technical
- Rolling stock: ICF coach
- Track gauge: 1,676 mm (5 ft 6 in)
- Electrification: Yes
- Operating speed: 51 km/h (32 mph) average including halts.
Route map
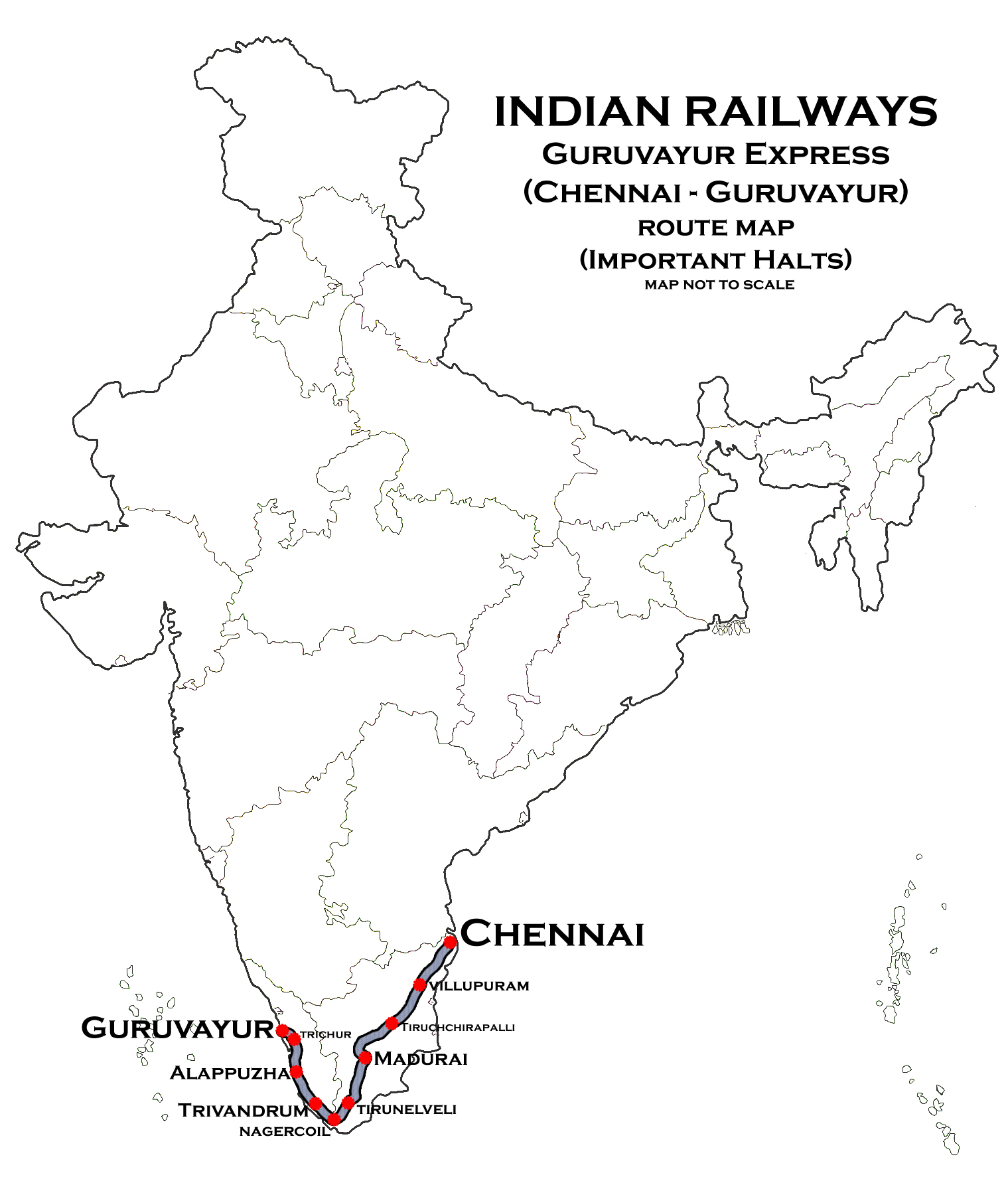

The 16127 / 16128 Chennai Egmore–Guruvayur Express is one of the express trains of Southern Railway zone in India, which runs between Chennai Egmore in Tamilnadu to Guruvayur in Kerala. This train is the successor the erstwhile Chennai Egmore (MS) - Cochin Harbour Terminus (CHTS) Mixed Express. The Mixed Express stopped running after Cochin Harbour Terminus (CHTS) was closed down for Passenger services in 2000.

== Background ==
Earlier it used to connect Cochin Harbour Terminus (CHTS) with state capital of Kerala, Thiruvananthapuram and was later extended to Nagercoil, Madurai and then Chennai. Cochin Harbour Terminus (CHTS) was closed down for Passenger services in 2000. Hence the Train was introduced in 2003 to run between capital of Tamil Nadu, Chennai and the temple city, Guruvayur in Thrissur district of Kerala via Tiruchirapalli, Madurai, Tirunelveli, Nagercoil, Trivandrum the capital city of Kerala, Ernakulam & Thrissur. A link of the train runs up to Thoothukudi as it was announced by the Railway Minister of India in the 2013-2014 Railway Budget. After December 2020, this link train was suspended.

== Route ==
At present the service leaves Chennai Egmore daily in the morning, and reaches Guruvayur the next morning. In return it leaves Guruvayur daily at night and reaches Chennai Egmore night of next day. It runs through Chengalpattu, Villupuram, Vriddhachalam, Trichy, Dindigul, Madurai Junction, Virudhunagar, Sattur, Kovilpatti, Tirunelveli, Vallioor , Nagercoil Town, Thiruvananthapuram Central, Kollam, Kayamkulam, Ernakulam Junction, Thrissur, Punkunnam.

== Schedule ==
Earlier in 1990's era, this daily express train departed from Chennai Egmore at 9.00 hrs in the morning, reaching Cochin Harbour Terminus (CHTS) next day at 07.45 hrs. In return the express train departed from Cochin Harbour Terminus (CHTS) at 21.00 hrs, reaching Chennai Egmore next day at 19.45 hrs, covering 1,022 km (635 mi) in 22 hrs 45 mins at speed of 45 kilometres per hour (28 mph), But with closure of Cochin Harbour Terminus (CHTS) in 2002, from 2003, this daily express train commences its journey as Train Number 16127 from Chennai Egmore at 10.20 hrs and reaches Guruvayur the next day at 07.40 hrs, links the important cities and towns of southern Tamil Nadu with Kerala via Chord line reversing loco at Nagercoil Junction. It is recently skipping Nagercoil Jn and has a stop at Nagercoil Town. It connects the important cities of Chennai, Villupuram, Tiruchirappalli, Madurai and Tirunelveli in Tamil Nadu with Thiruvananthapuram, Kollam, Kochi and Thrissur in Kerala. It longitudinally crosses almost the whole state of Tamil Nadu. It runs via Alleppey route in Kerala. In return direction the express train leaves Guruvayur at 23.15 hrs daily as Train Number 16128 and reaches Chennai Egmore the next day at 20.25 hrs via the same route. (Note: The schedule and routes are subject to change for administrative reasons.)

== See also ==
- Tambaram-Nagercoil Antyodaya Express
- Nellai Express
- Pearl City Express
- Pothigai Express
- Silambu Express
- Pandian Express
- Vaigai Express
