= Pallavan Express =

Train in India

Pallavan Superfast Express
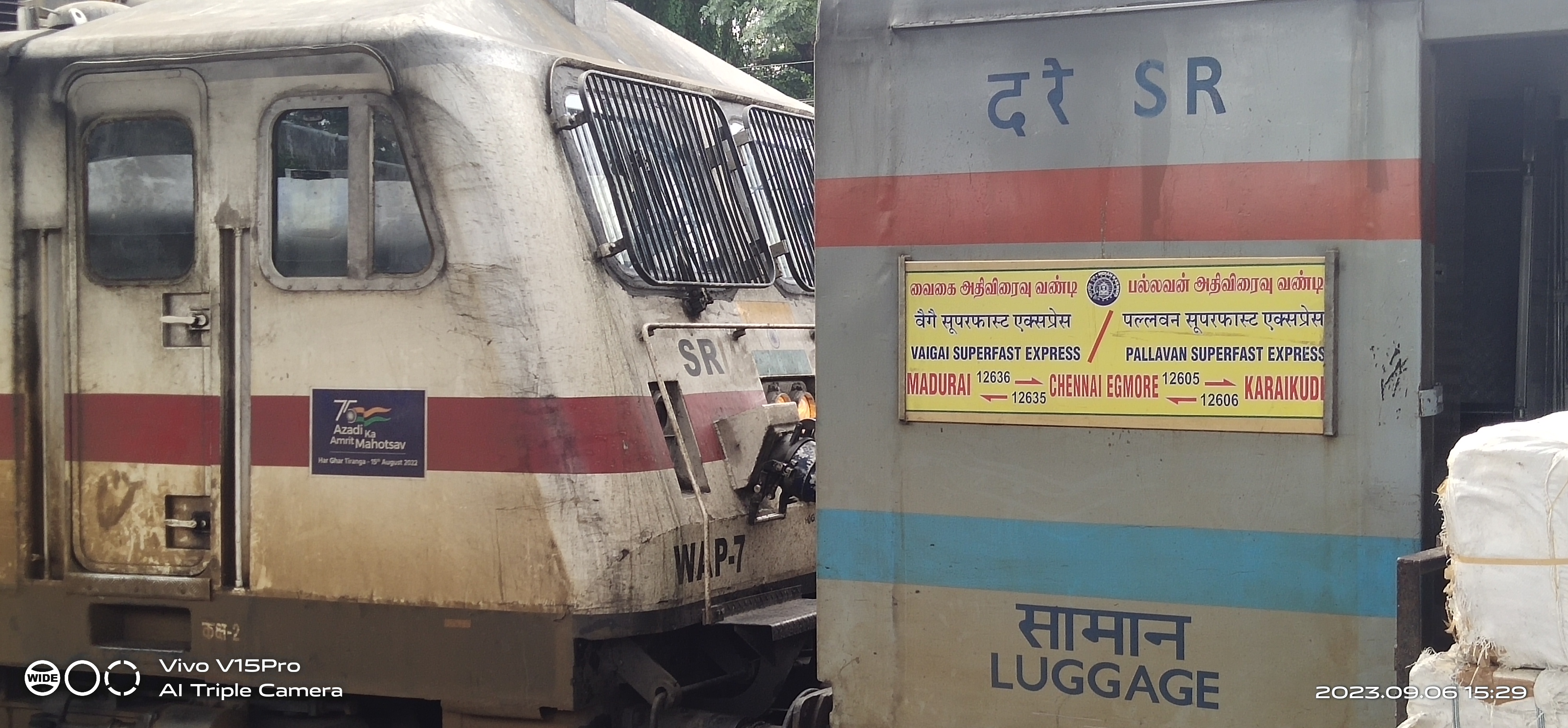
- Chennai Egmore - Karaikudi Pallavan Superfast Express At Chennai Egmore.

Overview
- Service type: Superfast
- Status: Active
- Predecessor: Madras Egmore Madurai Pallavan Express
- First service: 15 August 1984; 41 years ago
- Successor: Karaikkudi Chennai Egmore Pallavan Superfast Express
- Current operator: Southern Railway

Route
- Termini: Karaikkudi (KKDI); Chennai Egmore (MS)
- Stops: 12
- Distance travelled: 426 km (265 mi)
- Average journey time: 6 hours 50 minutes
- Service frequency: Daily
- Train number: 12605 / 12606
- Line used: Chord line

On-board services
- Classes: 3 A/C Chair Car; 13 Non A/C Chair Car; 3 General Unreserved; 1 EoG; 1 Second Class Luggage Rake with Divyangjan compartment; 1 Pantry (A/C Hot Buffet)
- Disabled access: Disabled access
- Seating arrangements: Yes
- Sleeping arrangements: No
- Catering facilities: Available
- Observation facilities: Enlarged windows
- Entertainment facilities: Nil
- Baggage facilities: Available as overhead racks in all coaches, single dedicated 2 ton Luggage coach (for Baggage above 20 kgs)
- Other facilities: Electricity outlet ports for charging, Food and Bottle holders, Foot rest and reclining seats.

Technical
- Rolling stock: LHB coach
- Track gauge: 1,676 mm (5 ft 6 in)
- Electrification: 25 kV, 50 Hz AC OHE railway traction.
- Operating speed: 69 km/h (43 mph) average including halts.
- Depot: Madurai
- Track owner: Indian Railways
- Rake maintenance: Madurai depot
- Rake sharing: 12635/12636 Vaigai Superfast Express
Route map
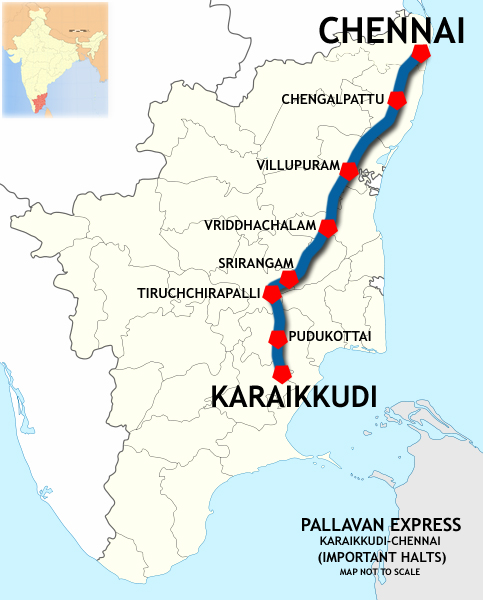

The 12605 / 12606 Pallavan Superfast Express (Note: The train was named to commemorate the Pallavas Kingdom, who ruled over the parts that is the present Chennai and its surroundings.) is an Intercity express typed superfast service operated by the Southern Railway zone of the Indian Railways. This service connects the cities of Chennai to Karaikudi via Tiruchirappalli in the Indian state of Tamil Nadu. The rakes of this train was upgraded to brand new modern LHB rakes from 30 June 2019. This train is fondly called as Prince of Southern Railways.

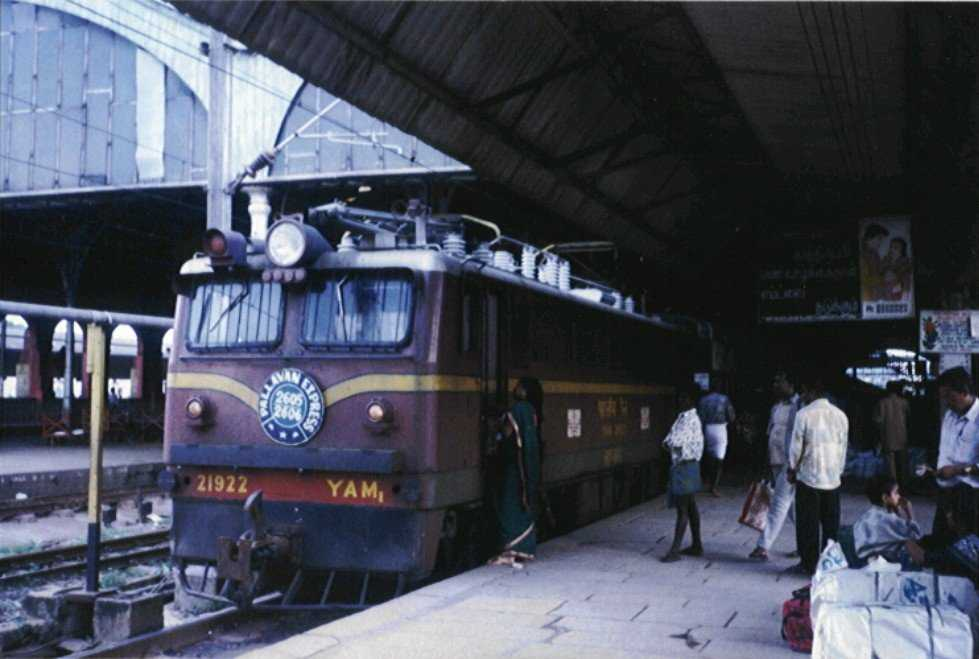
YAM 1 LOCOMOTIVE COUPLED FOR MADRAS EGMORE TIRUCHCHIRAPPALLI PALLAVAN EXPRESS

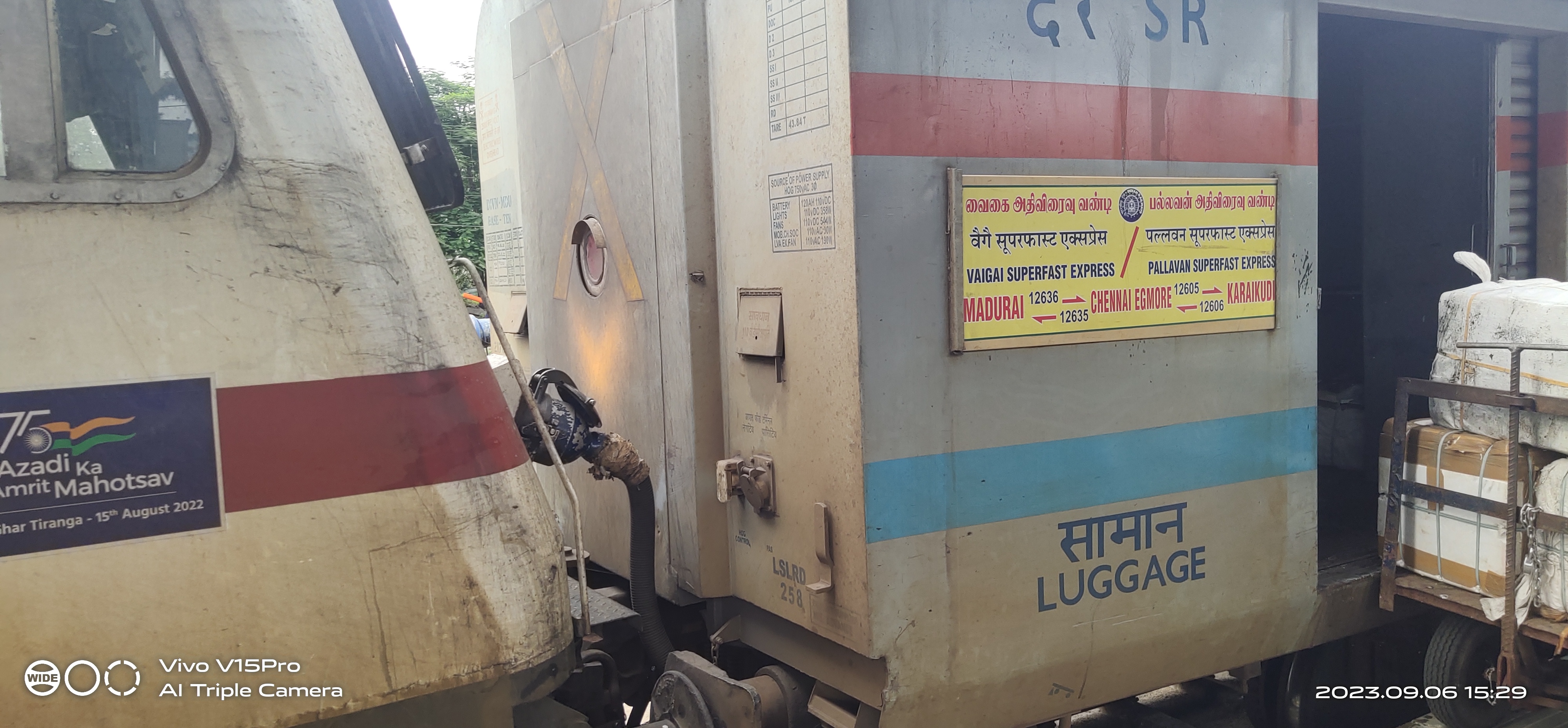

== History ==
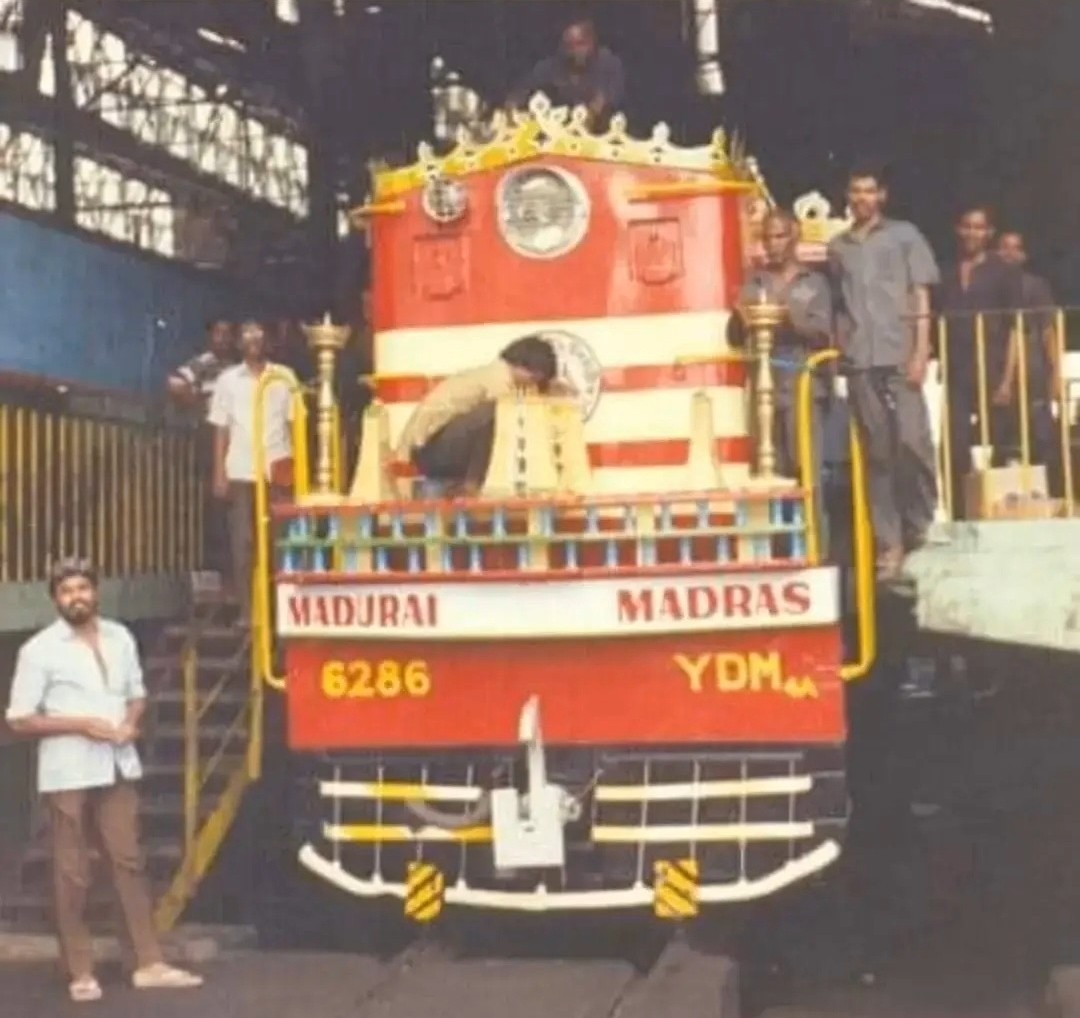
6286 YDM 4A LOCOMOTIVE DECORATION FOR INAUGURATION OF MADRAS MADURAI PALLAVAN EXPRESS

This Express was introduced to run along with the Vaigai Express from Chennai to Madurai in Metre Gauge era. The express was initially introduced on 15 August 1984 between Chennai and Madurai as a daily day express service with remaining rakes of Vaigai Superfast Express in the name of Pallavan Express which is listed in the timetable then (as shown in the image).

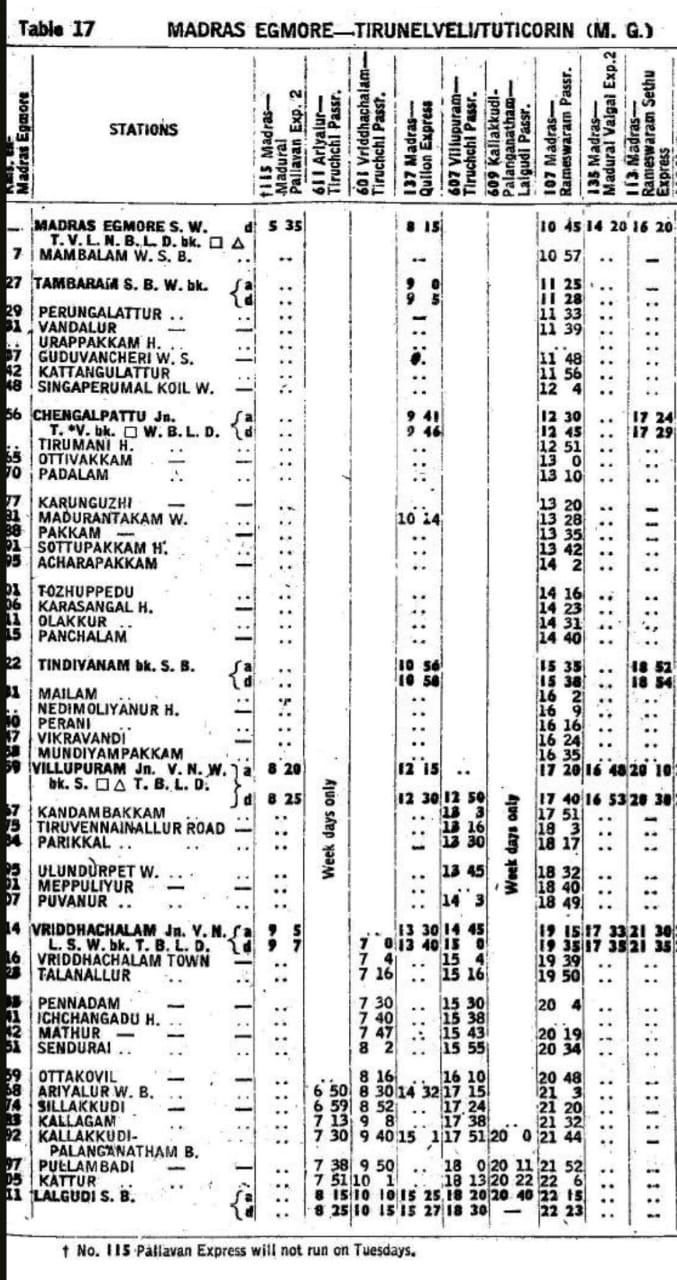
Madras Egmore Madurai Pallavan Express Timetable (1985), Southern Railways

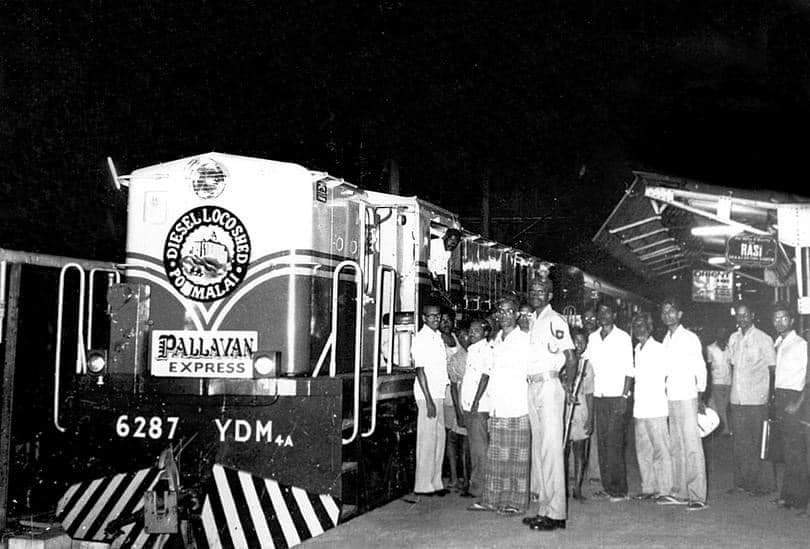
6287 YDM 4A LOCOMOTIVE BOUND FOR MADURAI MADRAS PALLAVAN EXPRESS

Both Pallavan and Vaigai Express took approximately 5 hours 40 minutes to cover 330 km on Chennai - Tiruchchirappalli Metre Gauge route.

From 1984 to 1986 115 DOWN Pallavan departed Madras Egmore at 05:35 and reached Madurai Junction around 14:30 again 116 UP Pallavan departed from Madurai at 15:00 and reached Madras Egmore at 22:30. By that time it had only 4 stops Villupuram Junction, Vridhachalam Junction, Tiruchchirappalli Junction and Dindigul Junction.

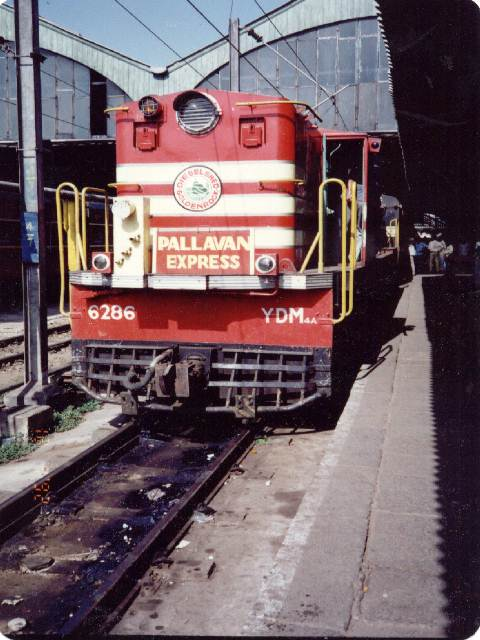
6286 YDM 4A LOCOMOTIVE BOUND FOR MADRAS EGMORE TIRUCHCHIRAPPALLI PALLAVAN EXPRESS

Then from 1986, Pallavan SuperFast Express was made to run till Tiruchchirappalli Junction by Mr.B.Panchapakesan where it faced a slot change. It departed Tiruchchirappalli Junction around 6:15 and reached Madras Egmore at 11:30 and departed Madras Egmore at 15:30 and reached Tiruchchirappalli Junction at 20:45. It had 3 stops, Villupuram Junction, Vridhachalam Junction and Srirangam.

Later, in 1998 this train got converted to Broad Gauge and stops were increased due to demand. Tambaram, Chengalpattu, Melmaruvathur, Ariyalur, Lalgudi stops were added in year 2000–2006. Pennadam stop was added from May 2025.

And its rakes are shared with Vaigai Super Fast Express at Chennai Egmore remains same since 1986. Both Vaigai and Pallavan were the only SuperFast trains in Chennai - Tiruchchirappalli - Madurai section till 2000.

27 years later, it was extended till Karaikudi, with a stop in Pudukottai, effective from 1 September 2013. This express runs along with Vaigai Superfast serves as fastest public commutation mode between Chennai and Tiruchchirappalli/Karaikkudi apart from air.

== Schedule ==
The Pallavan Express departs Karaikudi Junction at 05:40 AM then reaches Tiruchirappalli Junction at 06:50 AM, and will reach its final destination Chennai Egmore at 12:15 PM

And 12605 Pallavan Express departs Chennai Egmore at 03:40 PM then arrives Tiruchirappalli Junction around 08:40 PM and reaches Karaikkudi Junction at 10:30 PM .

The train has one pantry car for providing continuous refreshment/food supply to passengers. Food fares are applicable and will be in good quality.

== Rakes ==
Coach Position of 12606 KKDI MS PALLAVAN SUPERFAST

Loco	1	2	3	4	5	6	7	8	9	10	11	12	13	14	15	16	17	18	19	20	21	22
	EOG	UR	C1	C2	C3	D1	D2	D3	D4	D5	D6	D7	PC	D8	D9	D10	D11	D12	D13	UR	UR	SLR

Initially when introduced between Chennai and Madurai YAM-1 was used to haul this train in MG.

Chord line was electrified and from 2012, this train used AJJ/ED WAP4. Then WDP-3A take a turn to pull it

Currently it is regularly hauled by RPM or ED WAP7 earlier was WAP-4 and WDP-3A

The rakes are maintained at Madurai.

== Developments ==
Strong demands arising to operate this train from Tiruchchirappalli Junction like earlier days as this train has high patronage in Tiruchchirappalli suburbs.

There are also demands to extend this train from Karaikudi Junction to Manamadurai Junction which is further 62 km away from Karaikudi junction along with a stoppages at Devakottai Road, Kallal and Sivaganga.

== Incidents ==
On 25 April 2018, Front wheels of WDP4D numbered 40405 which hauled 12606 UP Karaikkudi - Chennai Pallavan Superfast Express derailed while entering Tiruchchirappalli Junction railway station at 6:27 am. It was reported due to rail fracture, no injures and casualties reported. Then train was moved further with the delay of three hours towards Chennai.

== See also ==
- Cholan Express
- Vaigai Express
- Rockfort Express
- Mysore-Mayiladuthurai Express
- Pearl City Express
- Chennai Egmore–Kanniyakumari Express
- Tambaram–Nagercoil Antyodaya Express
- Chendur Express
- Tea Garden Express
- Pandian Express
- Ananthapuri Express
- Uzhavan Express
- Boat Mail Express
- Sethu Express
- Nilgiri Express
- Cheran Express
- Silambu Express
- Thamirabarani Express
