= Tiruchirappalli–Thiruvananthapuram Intercity Express =

Train service in India

Overview
- Service type: Express
- Status: Operating
- Locale: Tiruchirappalli
- First service: 14 July 2012; 14 years ago (initial run between TPJ and TEN); 15 July 2017; 9 years ago (extended to TVC)
- Current operator: Southern Railway zone

Route
- Termini: Tiruchirappalli Junction (TPJ); Thiruvananthapuram Central (TVC)
- Stops: 11
- Distance travelled: 462 km (287 mi)
- Average journey time: 8 Hours 20 Minutes
- Service frequency: Daily
- Train number: 22627/22628

On-board services
- Classes: CC, 2S, SLR, SLRD and UR/GS
- Disabled access: Disabled access
- Seating arrangements: Open coach (Reserved); Corridor coach (Unreserved)
- Sleeping arrangements: No
- Auto-rack arrangements: No
- Catering facilities: No
- Observation facilities: Windows in all carriages
- Entertainment facilities: No
- Baggage facilities: Overhead racks Baggage carriage

Technical
- Rolling stock: Locomotive: WAP-7/WAP-4 (RPM); Bogie: 1 AC chair car (CC); 7 second seating (2S) ten UR/GS; 2 SLR
- Track gauge: 1,676 mm (5 ft 6 in)
- Electrification: 25Kva
- Operating speed: 56 kilometres per hour (35 mph)
- Track owner: Southern Railway zone
- Timetable number: 7/7A
- Rake maintenance: Tiruchirappalli Junction
- Rake sharing: Guruvayur–Thiruvananthapuram Intercity Express
Route map
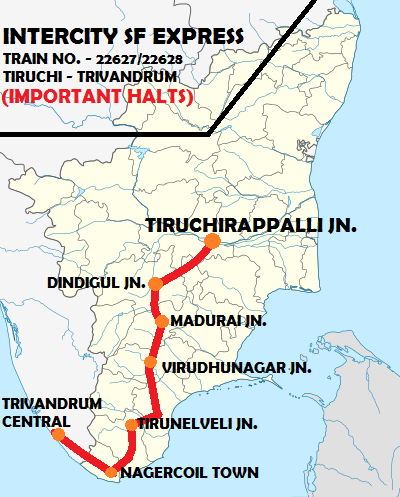
- Map depicting route of Trichy-Trivandrum intercity Superfast express

Tiruchirappalli–Thiruvananthapuram Central Intercity Express is an Express train connecting Tiruchirappalli with Thiruvananthapuram, capital of Kerala, via Dindigul, Madurai, Tirunelveli, Nagercoil between the states of Tamil Nadu and Kerala, India.

== General information ==
This train was introduced during the 2012–2013 railway budget as a new daily train between Tiruchirappalli and Tirunelveli in Tamil Nadu, India. The train, numbered as 22627/22628, made its inaugural run on 14 July 2012. And it made its regular service since 15 July 2012. This train has extended up to Thiruvananthapuram Central since 15 July 2017.

== Rakes ==
The train has 20 bogies comprising One A/C Chair Car (CC), four Second Seating (2S), 13 Unreserved Coaches (UR/GS), 2 Luggage Rake (SLR), thirteen general compartments (unreserved). (Note: The coach composition is subject to change.)

Loco	1	2	3	4	5	6	7	8	9	10	11	12	13	14	15	16	17	18		
	SLR	GS	GS	GS	GS	GS	GS	D4	D3	D2	D1	C1	GS	GS	GS	GS	GS	GS	GS	SLR

== Enroute ==
This service has had brief stoppages at Dindigul Junction, Madurai Junction, Virudhunagar Junction and Tirunelveli Junction on both directions

== See also ==
- Rockfort Express
- Cholan Express
- Pallavan Express
- Vaigai Express
- Pandian Express
- Guruvayur Express
- Ananthapuri Express
