= Tambaram–Nagercoil Antyodaya Superfast Express =

Train service in Tamil Nadu, India

Tambaram – Nagercoil Junction Antyodaya Express
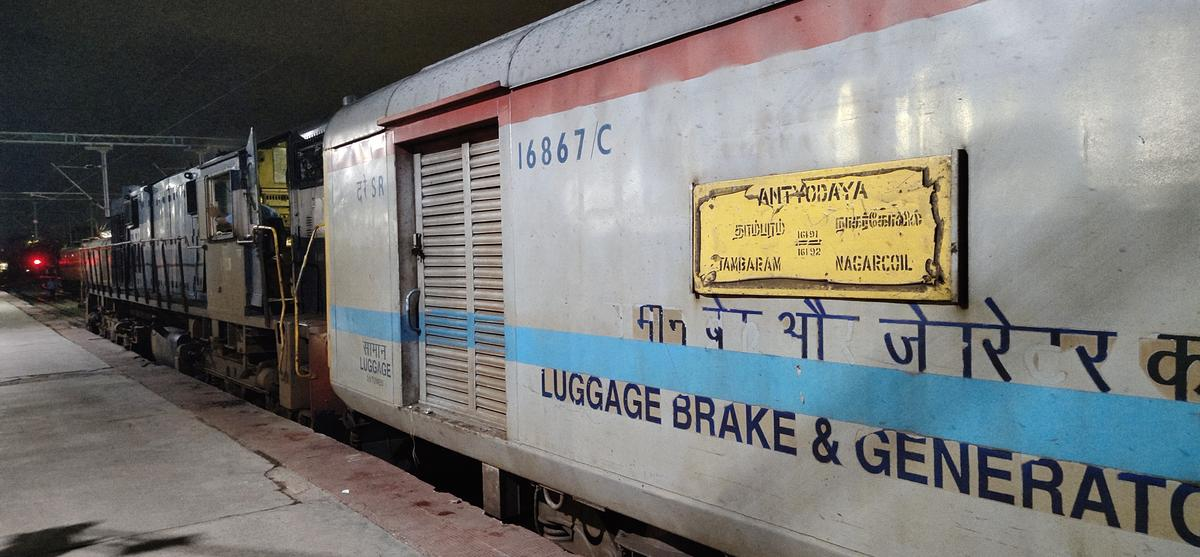
- 11121 ED/WDM-3D Antyodaya Express is at Madurai Junction Waiting for Green Signal

Overview
- Service type: Antyodaya Express
- Status: Active
- Locale: Tamilnadu
- First service: 9 June 2018; 8 years ago
- Current operator: Southern Railway zone
- Ridership: Superfast Antyodaya Express

Route
- Termini: Tambaram (TBM); Nagercoil (NCJ)
- Stops: 14
- Distance travelled: 764 km (475 mi)
- Average journey time: 13 hrs 50 min
- Service frequency: Daily
- Train number: 20691 / 20692 (16191/16192 = Old Numbers)

On-board services
- Class: General/Unreserved
- Disabled access: Disabled access
- Seating arrangements: Yes
- Sleeping arrangements: No
- Catering facilities: No
- Observation facilities: CCTV Camera in all coaches
- Entertainment facilities: no
- Baggage facilities: yes
- Other facilities: Water vending machines, smoke alarms, CCTV, and mobile phone charging ports

Technical
- Rolling stock: WAP-7 Loco from Electric Loco Shed, Royapuram
- Track gauge: 1,676 mm (5 ft 6 in)
- Electrification: 25 kV AC, 50 Hz (Over Head Traction)
- Operating speed: 67 kilometres per hour (42 mph)
Route map
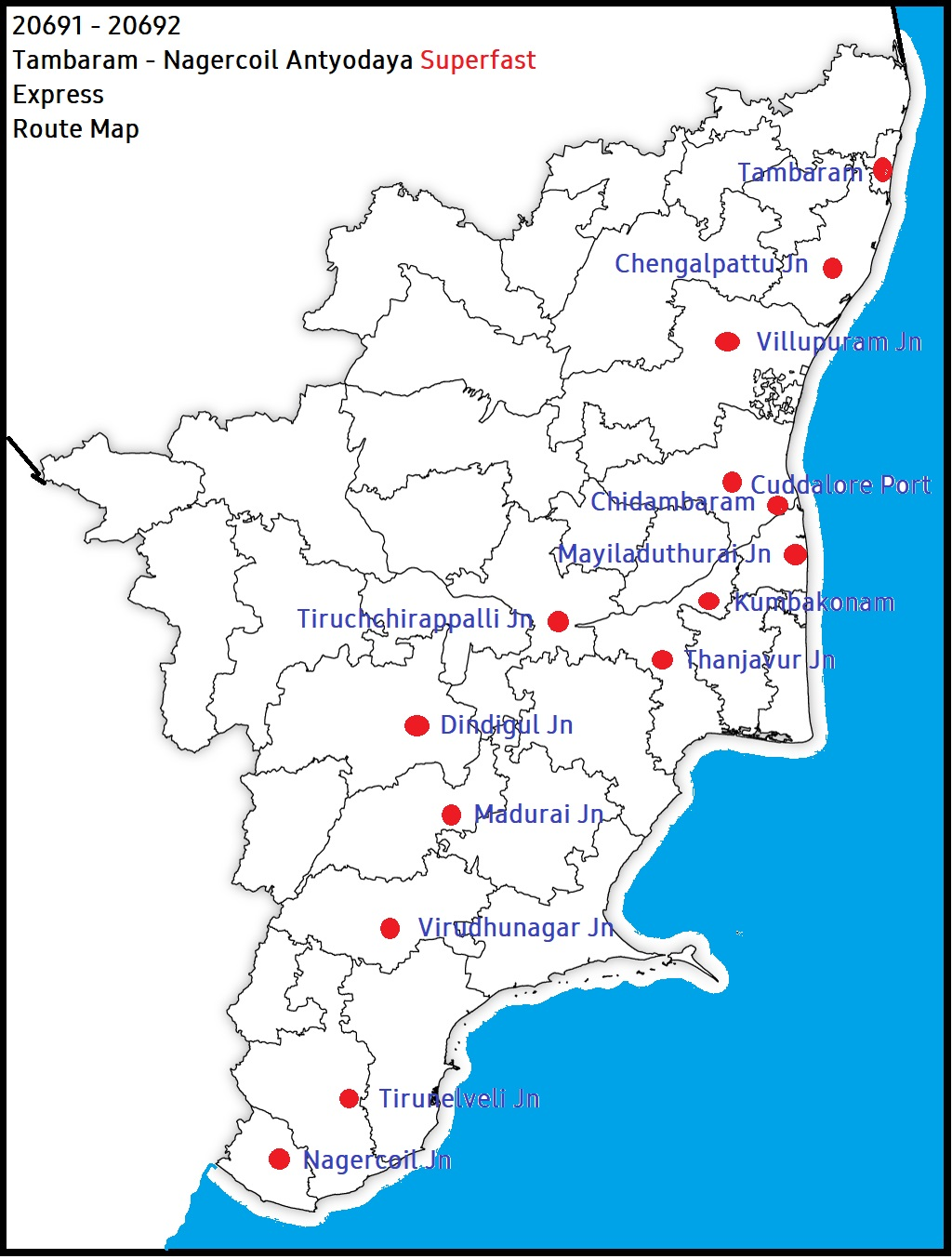

The 20691 / 20692 Tambaram–Nagercoil Antyodaya SF Express (via Chengalpattu Jn, Kumbakonam, Thanjavur Jn, Tiruchchirappalli Jn, Madurai Jn, Tirunelveli Jn) is a daily unreserved superfast express train of the Indian Railways connecting Chennai Tambaram and Nagercoil Junction in Tamil Nadu. It is operated daily from Chennai Tambaram to Nagercoil Junction as train number 20691, and from Nagercoil Junction to Chennai Tambaram as train number 20692.It is the only daily running unreserved train in India.

Announced in 2017, the train started its operations on 9 June 2018 from Tirunelveli Junction and on 10 June 2018 from Tambaram.

This train was previously running only up to Tirunelveli Junction but recently this train has been extended up to Nagercoil Junction by Indian Railways.

== Coach composition ==
Loco	1	2	3	4	5	6	7	8	9	10	11	12	13	14	15	16	17	18	19	20
	EOG	UR	UR	UR	UR	UR	UR	UR	UR	UR	UR	UR	UR	UR	UR	UR	UR	UR	UR	EOG

== See also ==
- Kanniyakumari Superfast Express
- Cheran Superfast Express
- Pothigai Superfast Express
- Pallavan Superfast Express
- Tiruchchirappalli Junction
- Tiruchirappalli–Thiruvananthapuram Intercity Express
