= Indian locomotive class WDP-3A =

Indian Railway passenger class diesel locomotive

WDP-3A
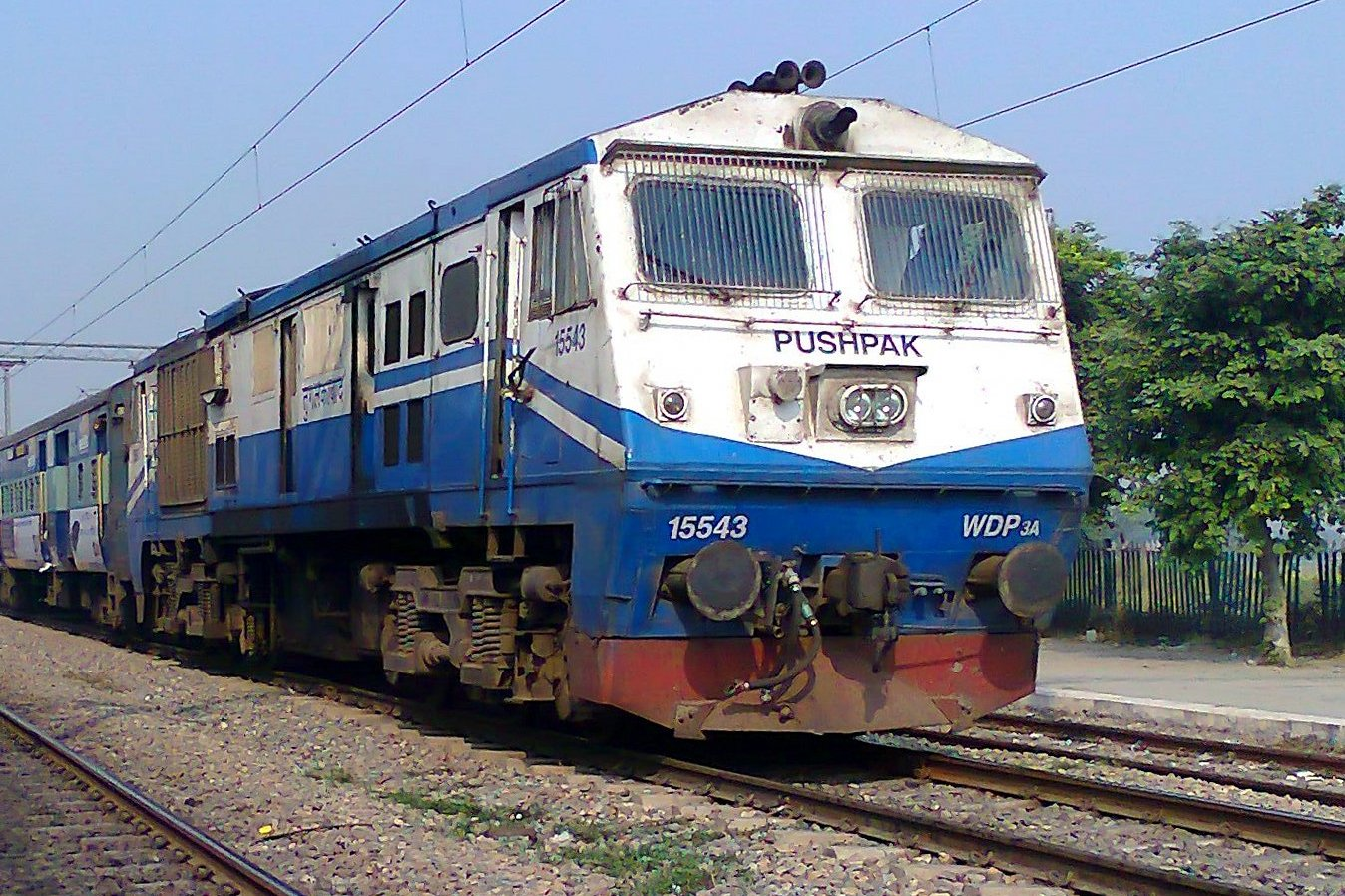
- Tughlakabad based WDP-3A named "PUSHPAK" at Delhi Jn.
Type and origin
- Power type: Diesel–electric
- Builder: Banaras Locomotive Works (BLW); Patiala Locomotive Works (PLW)
- Serial number: WDP-2-1 to WDP-2-44
- Model: ALCO DL560C variant
- Build date: October 4, 1998, to February 1, 2001
- Total produced: 44
- Rebuilder: Patiala Locomotive Works (PLW), Patiala
Specifications
- Configuration
  - AAR: Co-Co
  - UIC: Co′Co′
- Gauge: 1,676 mm (5 ft 6 in)
- Bogies: Flexicoil Mark V fabricated bogies
- Wheel diameter: 1,092 mm (3 ft 7 in)
- Wheelbase: 12.834 m (42 ft 1 1/4 in)
- Length: 18.62 m (61 ft 1 1/8 in)
- Width: 2.964 m (9 ft 8 3/4 in)
- Height: 4.185 m (13 ft 8 3/4 in)
- Axle load: 17,500 kg (38,600 lb)
- Loco weight: 117 t (115 long tons; 129 short tons)
- Fuel type: Diesel
- Fuel capacity: 5,000 L (1,100 imp gal; 1,300 US gal)
- Sandbox cap.: 58 kg (128 lb)
- Fuel consumption: 500 Liter
- Prime mover: ALCO 251-C
- RPM range: 400-1050 rpm
- Engine type: V16 Diesel engine
- Aspiration: ABB VTC304-15 or Napier NA 295 IR turbocharger
- Traction motors: Bharat Heavy Electricals TA 10102 CW (new), BHEL TG 10931 AZ (old)
- Cylinders: 16
- Cylinder size: 228 mm × 266 mm (8.98 in × 10.47 in) bore x stroke
- Transmission: Diesel electric
- MU working: 2
- Train brakes: Air
- Safety systems: Alternative brake system
Performance figures
- Maximum speed: 160 km/h (99 mph)
- Power output: 3,100 hp (2,312 kW)
- Tractive effort: 30.45 t (30 long tons; 34 short tons)
Career
- Operators: Indian Railways
- Numbers: 15501-15544
- Nicknames: Toasters, Pushpak
- Locale: Southern Railway (GOC); Northern Railway (TKD); Central Railway (KYN)
- Delivered: 1997
- First run: 1998
- Preserved: 1 earmarked
- Scrapped: 2021-present
- Current owner: Indian railway
- Disposition: Partially Active (withdrawals ongoing)

The Indian locomotive class WDP-3A, colloquially nicknamed the Toaster, is a class of diesel–electric locomotive that was developed in 1998 by Banaras Locomotive Works, Varanasi for the Indian Railways. The model name stands for broad gauge (W), Diesel (D), Passenger traffic (P) locomotive with 3,100 horsepower (3A). The WDP-3A is a later classification of earlier WDP-2. They entered service in 1998. A total of 44 were built between 1998 and 2001.

They are the fastest ALCo based locomotive found in India with a top speed of 160 km/h, on par with the premier electric locomotives. The WDP-3A served IR for over 25 years. A significant number of these locomotives have been withdrawn from service, with few still in use, both on mainline and departmental duties. As of September 2026, 14 locomotives still retain "operational status" on the mainline as WDP-3A, with further examples having been scrapped.

== History ==
The first one was delivered in October 1998, named WDP-2. 44 units produced until February 2001 (Indian Railway road number 15501-15544) had dual cab forward design different from other classes of locos built by DLW (WDM-2, WDM-3A, WDG-3A and WDP-1). These new locomotives have control stand similar to many electric locomotives. They are re-geared versions of the WDM-3A. This was IR's attempt to build a high speed locomotive on the ALCO platform. But the EMD locos came with a much better performance with higher horsepower rating and ended the prospect of WDP-3As. These units have air brakes only and the gear ratio is 64:19.

These locos (classified as WDP-2s at the time) were introduced initially the Chennai Egmore - Kanyakumari Section, hauling many prestigious trains like the Pallavan Express, Vaigai Express, Rockfort Express, Nellai Express and Pothigai Express to name a few. A problem with the WDP-3A was that it would get uncomfortably hot inside the driving cabin on the radiator side and the locos were nicknamed “toasters” by the locomotive pilots. The WDP-3A was best known for hauling the Hazrat Nizamuddin - Trivandrum Rajdhani and later the Mumbai CSMT - Karmali Tejas Express through the Konkan Railway at a top speed of 120 kmph. In 2018, a couple of GOC-based WDP-3A locomotives were rebuilt at DMW Patiala with better bogies for riding comfort. Such rebuilt toasters bear the suffix 'R' to their road numbers.

However, due to age issues and cracking of bogie underframes, the WDP-3A locomotives of DLS, GOC, and KYN were withdrawn gradually from hauling passenger trains and were relegated to departmental use. In 2021, GOC announced the withdrawal of all WDP-3A's in their shed and a few WDP-3A's were sent to Ponmalai Workshop for scrapping. 15501 is to be preserved.

All WDP-3A locomotives of KYN DLS were condemned in January 2022 and scrapped at DLS.

== Train Services ==
The WDP-3A was primarily used to haul the listed services, most of them being in the Southern Railway zone.

- Pallavan Express
- Vaigai Express
- Rockfort Express
- Nellai Express
- Pothigai Express
- Hazrat Nizamuddin - Trivandrum Rajdhani
- Mumbai CSMT - Karmali Tejas Express

== Locomotive sheds ==
Zone	Name	Shed Code	Quantity
Northern Railway	Tughlakabad	TKDD	14
Total Locomotives Active as of September 2026			14

== Gallery ==
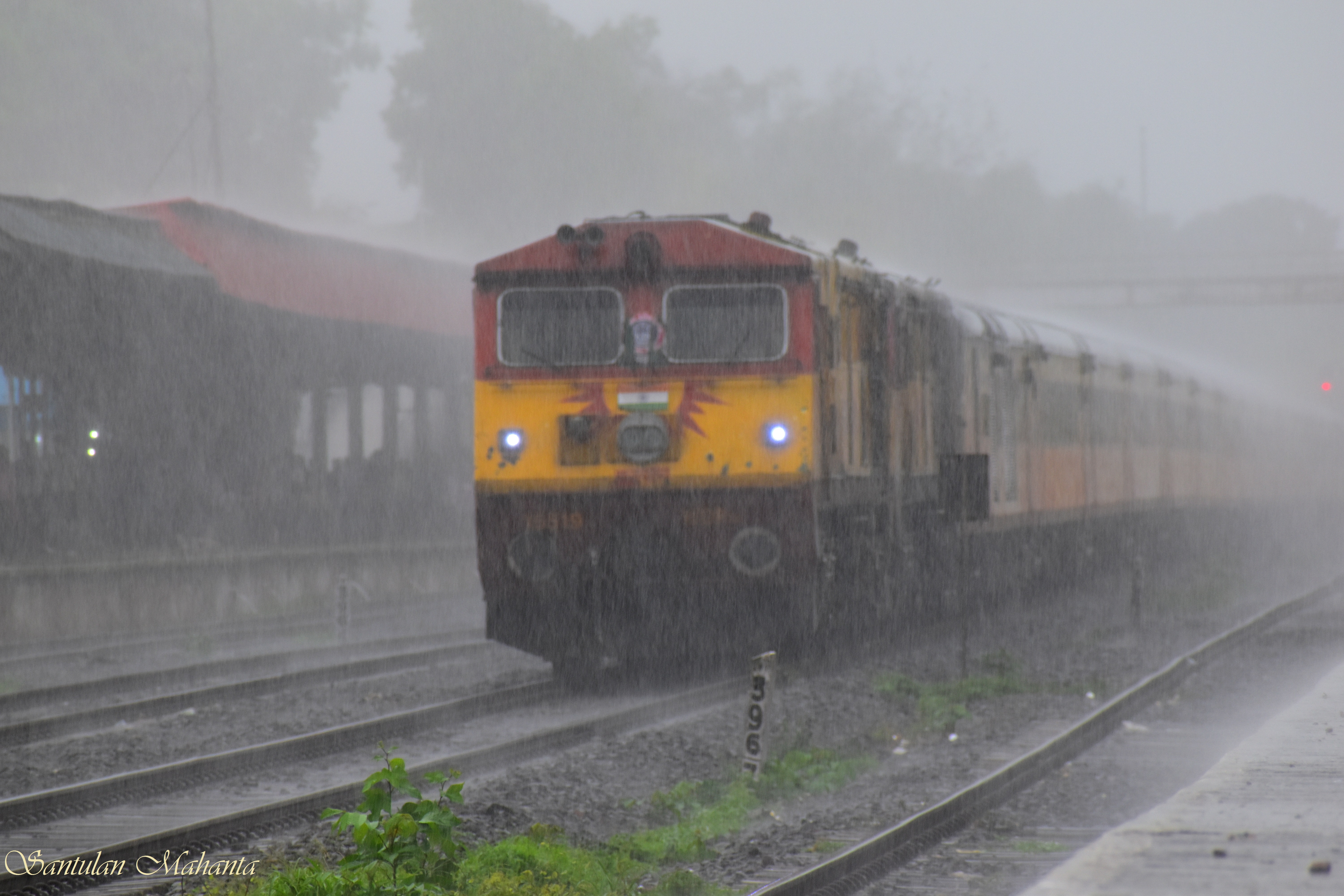
KYN WDP-3A hauling the Mumbai-Karmali Tejas Express.

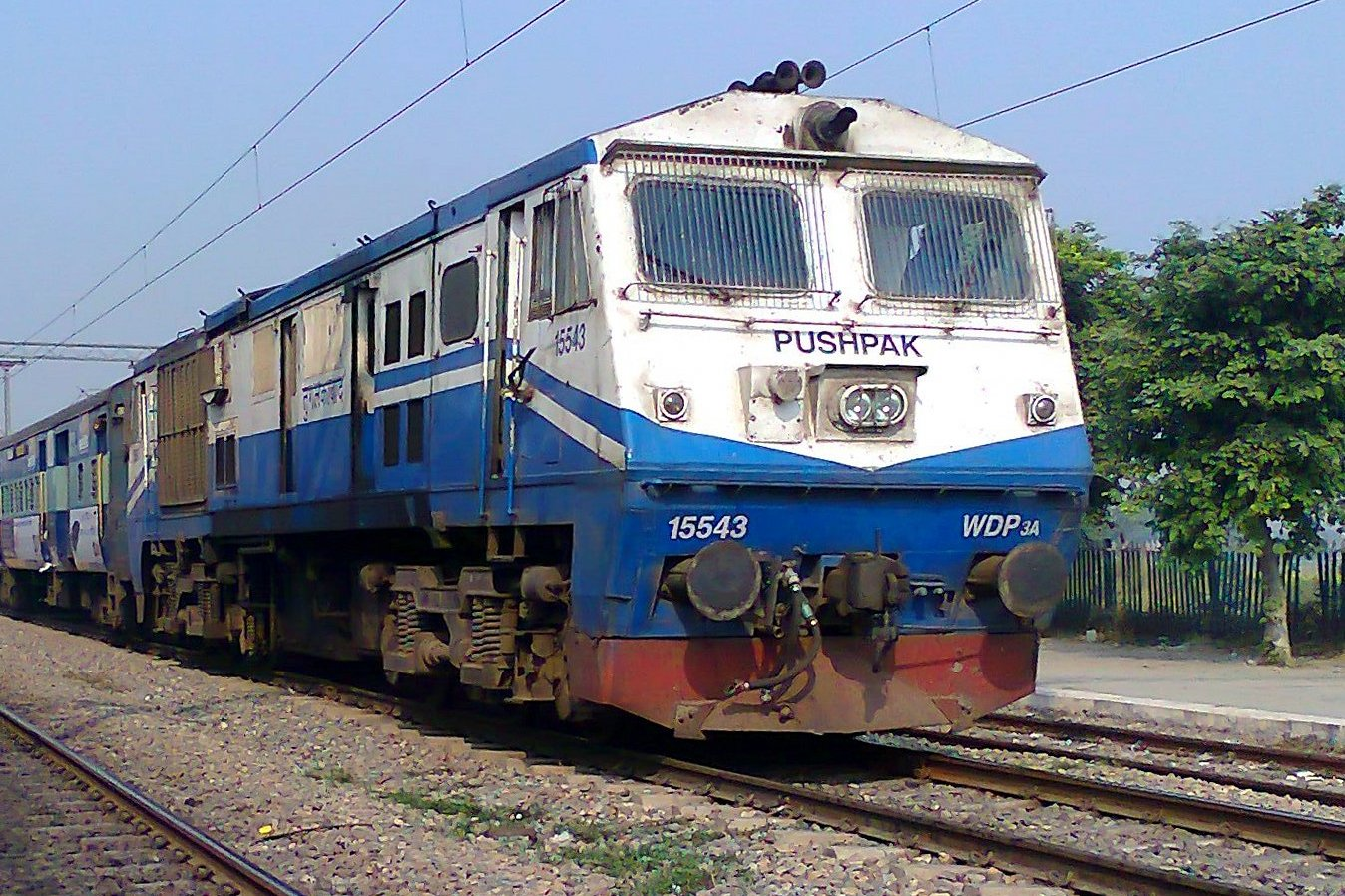
Tughlakabad WDP-3A named "Pushpak"

== See also ==
- Indian locomotive class WDM-3A
- Indian locomotive class WDM-2
- List of diesel locomotives of India
- Rail transport in India
- Indian Railways
