= Vaigai Express =

Highspeed train service in Tamil Nadu

Vaigai Superfast Express
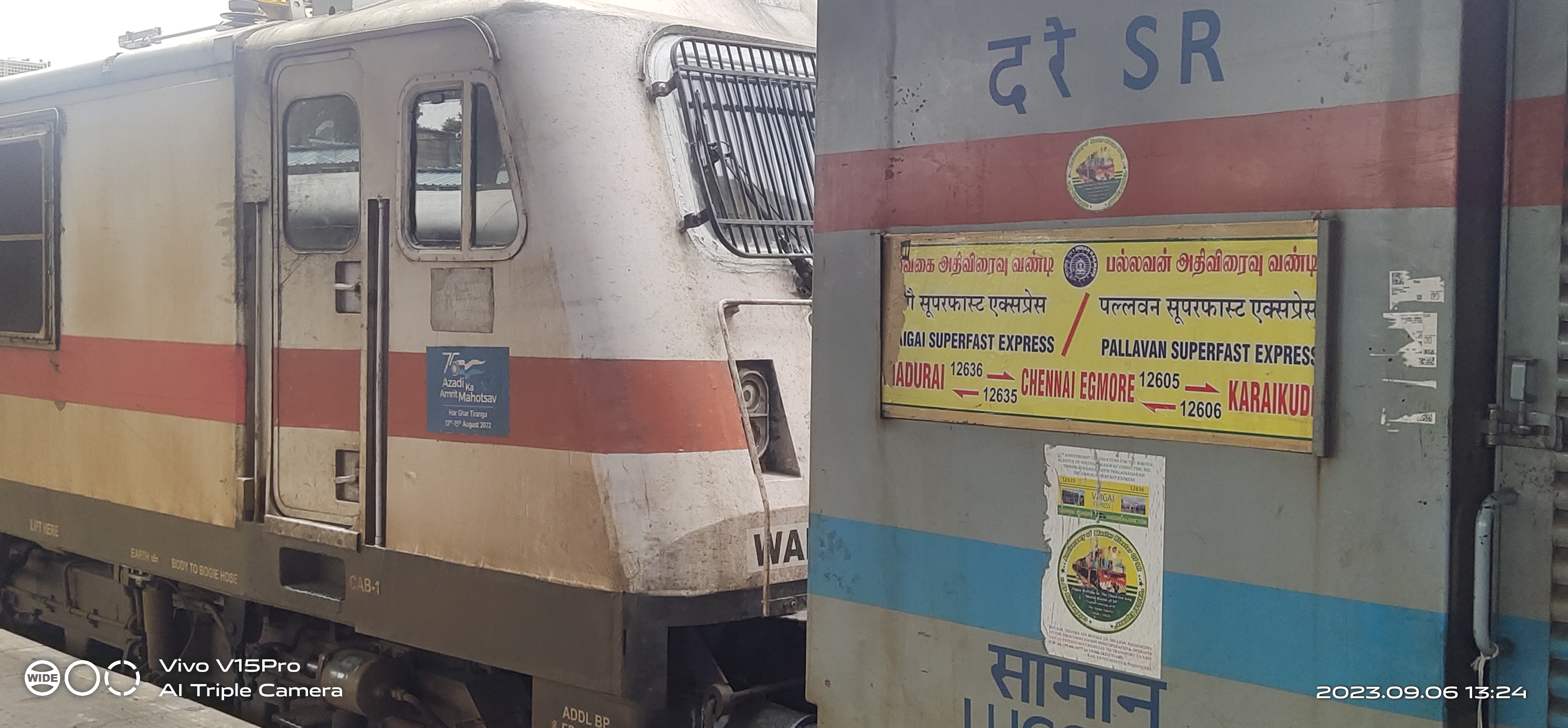
- Vaigai Superfast Express at Chennai Egmore

Overview
- Service type: High Speed Intercity Superfast Express
- Status: Active
- Locale: Tamil Nadu
- First service: 15 August 1977; 48 years ago
- Current operator: Southern Railway zone

Route
- Termini: Chennai Egmore (MS); Madurai Junction (MDU)
- Stops: 12
- Distance travelled: 493 km (306 mi)
- Average journey time: 7 hours 30minutes
- Service frequency: Daily
- Train number: 12635 / 12636
- Lines used: MS-TPJ Chord Line, TPJ-MDU Main Line

On-board services
- Classes: 3 A/C Chaircar Seater; 13 Non A/C Chair Car Seater; 3 Unreserved; 1 EOG; 1 Second Class Luggage Rake with Divyangjan compartment; 1 Pantry
- Disabled access: Disabled access
- Seating arrangements: Yes
- Sleeping arrangements: No
- Catering facilities: On-board
- Observation facilities: Windows in all carriages
- Entertainment facilities: No
- Baggage facilities: Overhead racks Baggage carriage

Technical
- Rolling stock: WAP-7 Loco from Electric Loco Shed, Royapuram earlier was WDP-3A
- Track gauge: 1,676 mm (5 ft 6 in)
- Electrification: 25kV AC, 50 Hz (Overhead Electric Traction)
- Operating speed: 72 km/h (45 mph) (Maximum permissible Speed: 130 Kmph)
- Average length: 22 Coaches (LHB coach)
- Track owner: Southern Railway zone
- Timetable number: 7/7A
- Rake maintenance: Madurai
- Rake sharing: Pallavan Express
Route map
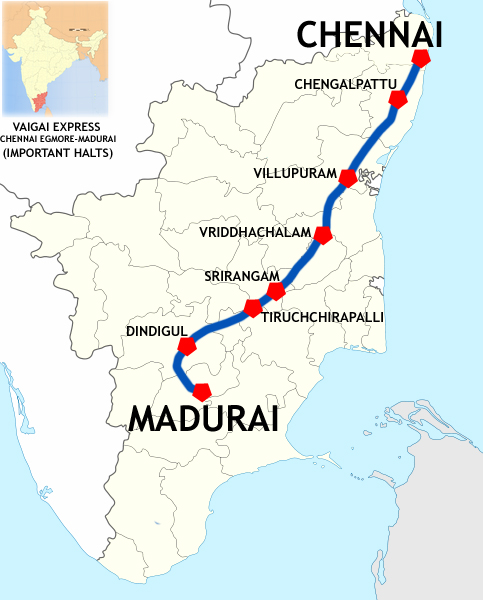

The 12635 / 12636 Vaigai Superfast Express is an Daily High Speed Intercity Superfast Express train which runs daily between Madurai and Chennai Egmore, via Tiruchirappalli. It is operated by the Southern Railway zone of the Indian Railways and was introduced due to increasing demand for a day train between the cities during the 1970s. It was the first instance in which a high-speed train was introduced on a metre-gauge railway within the Southern Railway zone. This train is fondly called as King of Southern Railways. Vaigai Express shares rake with Pallavan Express running between Chennai Egmore and Karaikudi Junction.

== History and background ==
The train, which was first started from Madurai, is named after the Vaigai River, which flows through the city.

On 15 August 1977 at 6:00 a.m., Down Train No. 135 Vaigai Express began its inaugural journey from Madurai Junction to Madras Egmore, with 16 yellow and green livery coaches and a matching YDM4 diesel loco. When introduced, the train had 16 coaches, hauled by twin-YDM4 diesel locos. On that day, the train clocked the fastest run between the two locations, in 7 hours and 15 minutes, entering Madras Egmore at 1:05 p.m. that afternoon. In doing so, it had matched the speed of many broad-gauge high-speed trains on the Southern Railway. The train was later slowed to a time of 7 hours and 40 minutes for safety purposes.

By 1984 the coach positions and rakes were changed to 8 cars after the changes in operation pattern of Pallavan Superfast Express to Tiruchchirappalli instead of operating from Madurai owing to which the new rake sharing pattern is the present operating pattern.

Both Vaigai and Pallavan were the only SuperFast trains of Chennai - Tiruchchirappalli - Madurai section till 2001.

At that time the train had only three stops: Villupuram Junction, Tiruchchirappalli Junction and Dindigul Junction. Later, due to demands, the number of stops was increased.

From 1999 onwards, Vaigai Superfast Express was converted from the metre gauge to the broad gauge, to be hauled by diesel locomotives manufactured by Golden Rock. From 12 February 2014 to 9 July 2015, the Vaigai Express was hauled by an electric locomotive, in the WAP-4 class. Since 9 July 2015, it has been regularly hauled by electric locomotives in the WAP-7 class, maintained by the Electric Loco Shed, Royapuram. The train has also been updated with a modern LHB coach, from 30 June 2019.

=== Record-breaking runs ===
On 3 March 2022, the Vaigai Express train made a historic record by covering a distance of 495 kilometres from Madurai to Chennai in 6 hours and 40 minutes. Despite departing at 7:26 a.m. with a delay of 21 minutes, the 12636 MDU-MS line reached its destination at 2:07 p.m., 23 minutes prior to its scheduled time. In doing so, it broke its own inaugural record of 7 hours 5 minutes established on 15 August 1977.

This record was broken once more on 15 October 2022, when the train covered the distance from Madurai to Chennai in 6 hours and 34 minutes.

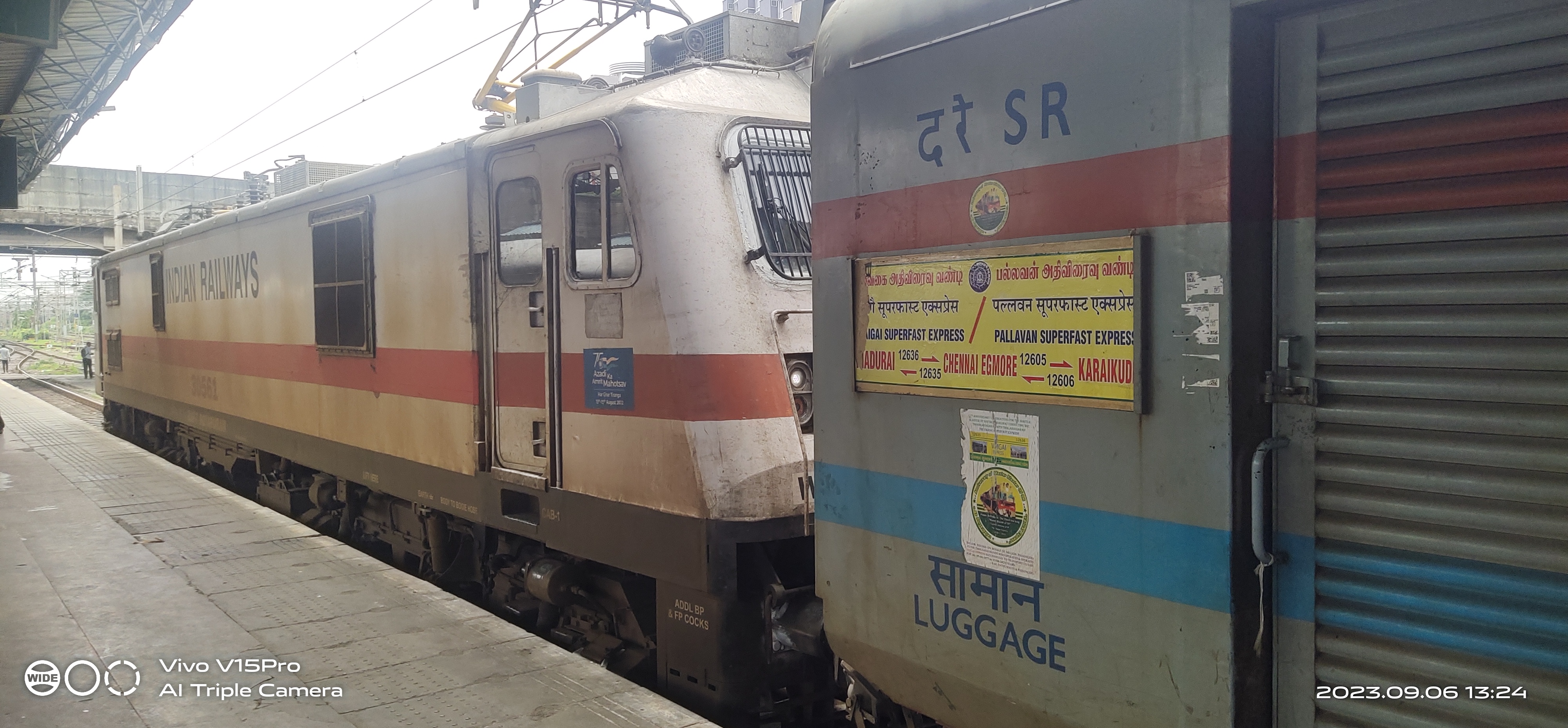
Vaigai Superfast Express at Chennai Egmore

== History of uniqueness ==
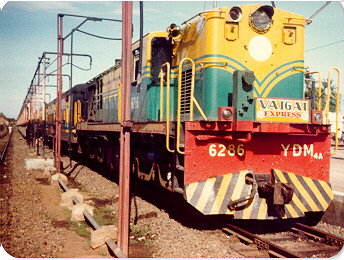

It was the only train at that time in SR which had completely tube-lighted interiors and sun-control sliding glass shutters installed for the first time in all its eight-second class coaches.

This is the only MG train on the SR to be fitted with specially enhanced buffers and certified to run at 110 km/h.

For the first time on the MG, the ICF manufactured two 40-seat AC chair car coaches exclusively for the Vaigai and Pallavan express and used in those trains.

It was the first train in Madurai railway division that ran on electric traction after the completion of 92 km long 25-KV overhead railway electrification of Dindigul - Trichy Section on 6 September 2011.

== Accident ==
Between August 1978 to January 1979 Vaigai Express was involved in accidents twice. On 21 December 1978 it dashed against two boulders between Talanallur and Vriddhachalam Town stations and on 22 December 1978, it derailed at Tiruchirappalli station.

== Rakes ==
Loco	1	2	3	4	5	6	7	8	9	10	11	12	13	14	15	16	17	18	19	20	21	22
	EOG	UR	UR	C1	C2	C3	D1	D2	D3	D4	D5	D6	D7	PC	D8	D9	D10	D11	D12	UR	UR	SLR

== See also ==
- Pandian Express
- Pallavan Express
- Rockfort Express
- Pearl City Express
- Nellai Express
- Chennai Egmore–Kanniyakumari Express
- Chendur Express
- Pothigai Express
- Ananthapuri Express
- Boat Mail Express
- Chemmozhi Express
