= Ariyalur railway station =

Railway station in Tamil Nadu, India

Ariyalur
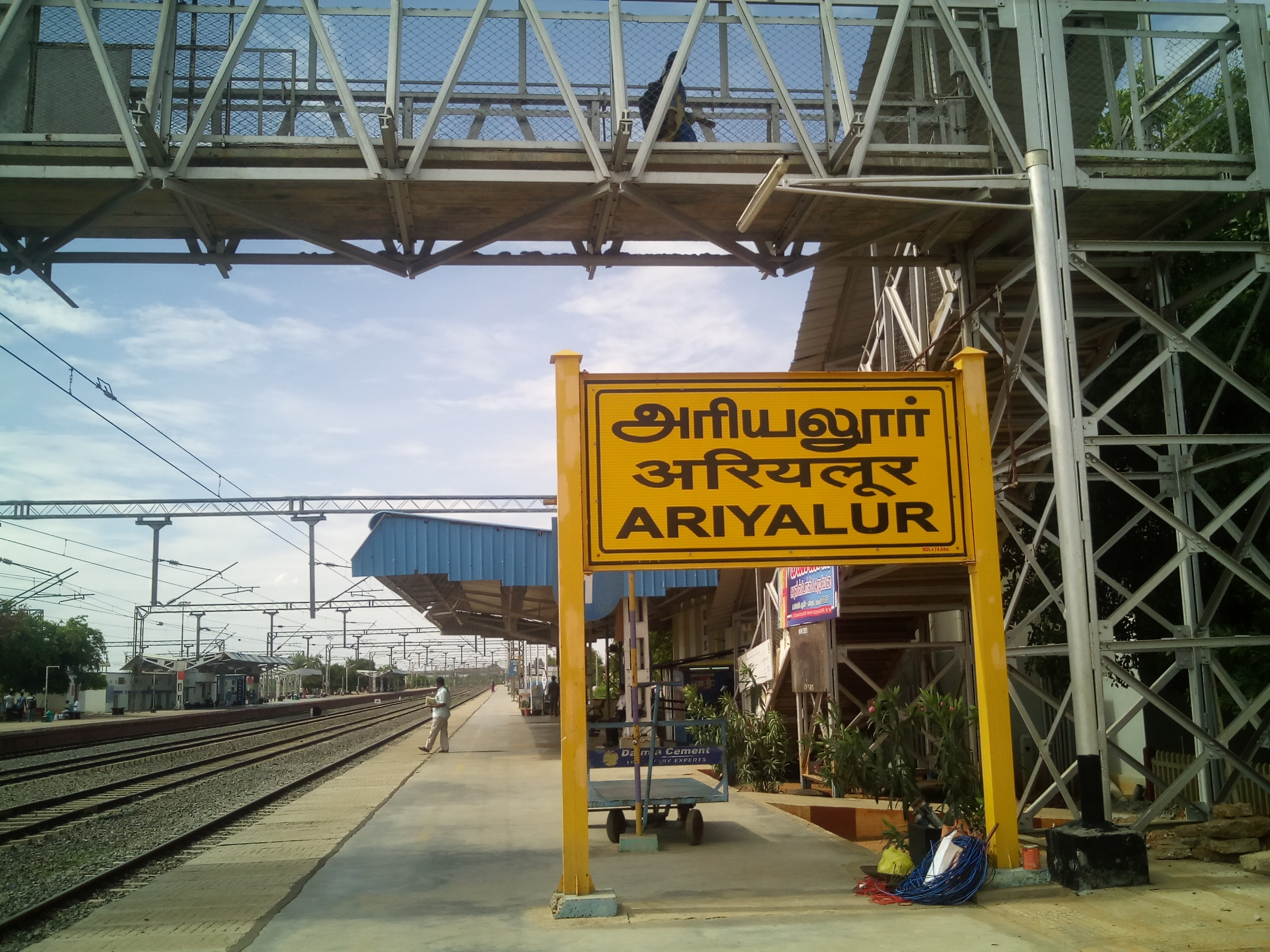
- Inside

General information
- Location: Railway Station Road, Ariyalur, Ariyalur district, Tamil Nadu; India
- Coordinates: 11.1491°N 79.0686°E
- Elevation: 70 metres (230 ft)
- System: Light rail, Commuter rail and Regional rail station
- Owner: Indian Railways
- Operator: Southern Railway zone
- Line: Chord line
- Platforms: 3
- Connections: TNSTCBus, Auto rickshaw

Construction
- Structure type: Standard (on-ground station)
- Parking: Yes
- Accessible: Disabled access

Other information
- Status: Functioning
- Station code: ALU
- Zone(s): Southern Railway zone
- Division(s): Tiruchchirappalli
- Fare zone: Indian Railways
Location

Ariyalur railway station (station code: ALU) is an NSG–5 category Indian railway station in Tiruchirappalli railway division of Southern Railway zone. It is the main railway station in Ariyalur, headquarters of the Ariyalur district in Tamil Nadu, India. It is located on the chord line between Viluppuram and Tiruchirappalli.

== Location and layout ==
The railway station is situated on the Perambalur main Road on the western part of the city. It is the main railhead for both Ariyalur, Thanajvur and Perambalur districts since railway stations in other towns of Ariyalur district such as Lalgudi and Sendurai barely have any express trains halting and Permbalur district does not have a railway station at all, ever since the bifurcation of the Ariyalur district. It hence serves as an important railway hub for passengers from the central districts of Tamil Nadu. Certain TNSTC busses are operated from Thanjavur to Ariyalur Railway station for passengers' convenience.

The station falls on the Viluppuram–Tiruchirappalli chord line, which is the only line passing through the station. The railway line towards the south has been completed doubling work, spanning across two sections namely the Ariyalur-Kallakudi Palanganatham stretch and then the Valadi-Kallakudi Palanganatham stretch, after which it is single line till Tiruchirappalli. The same double line infrastructure completed extends up to R.S. Mathur towards the north beyond which it is single line again till Virudhachalam Junction.

== Projects and development ==
In FY 2013-14, The Government of India, Indian Railways decided to connect Thanjavur - Pattukottai from Ariyalur. The land acquisition process was about to commence. But lately there was no improvement on the project. Presently, The SR prepared an detailed project report, that connects Ariyalur - Perambalur - Thuraiyur - Namakkal.

It is one of the 73 stations in Tamil Nadu to be named for upgradation under Amrit Bharat Station Scheme of Indian Railways.

== Amenities ==
The station has been declared as one of the Adarsh railway stations in Tamil Nadu. Hence it has amenities such as upper-class waiting rooms, ATMs, ramps and wheel chairs for the disabled, retiring rooms etc. During the rush hour, TNSTC busses which provides local bus services from the station to the Ariyalur Bus Stand and certain TNSTC busses operates towards Thanjavur.

The station however is suffering from serious infrastructural problems according to passengers. The withdrawal of many of the direct bus services from the station to Thanjavur, as well as absence of sufficient services on other routes is viewed as a great hardship on the part of commuters to the station. This is compounded by lack of regular bus services from Ariyalur railway station to the Ariyalur main bus stand and high auto rickshaw fares for commuting that distance. Lack of porters and petty shops, inadequate number of seats and shelters and unavailability of additional platforms form the other issues at the station. Project on doubling the track between Ariyalur and Valadi segment to a length of 50 km had been executed, the 25-km stretch between Ariyalur and Mathur also commissioned. As part of doubling of the track, the Ariyalur station has been beautified and expanded, according to Rail Vikas Nigam Limited (RVNL). Additional platform created was 550 metres. The additional platform would ensure smooth operation of trains.
