= Chord Line, Tamil Nadu =

Railway line in India

Chord Line

Overview
- Other name: Viluppuram - Trichy railway line
- Native name: கார்டு லைன்
- Status: Operating
- Owner: Indian Railways
- Locale: Tamil Nadu
- Termini: Viluppuram Junction (VM); Tiruchirappalli Junction (TPJ)
- Stations: 29
- Website: www.sr.indianrailways.gov.in

Service
- Type: Regional rail Heavy rail Light rail
- Services: 1
- Route number: 21/21A
- Operator: Southern Railway zone
- Depot(s): Golden Rock (GOC); Tondiarpet (TNP); Royapuram (RPM)

History
- Opened: 1 February 1929; 97 years ago

Technical
- Line length: Trichirappalli–Ariyalur = 70 km Ariyalur–Virudhachalam = 53 km Virudhachalam–Villupuram = 55 km Total Kilo Meters 178 km (111 mi)
- Number of tracks: Double Line (Triple line between GOC and TPJ)
- Track gauge: 1,676 mm (5 ft 6 in)
- Old gauge: 1,000 mm (3 ft 3 3/8 in)
- Loading gauge: 4,725 mm × 3,660 mm (15 ft 6.0 in × 12 ft 0.1 in) (BG)
- Electrification: 25 kV AC 50 Hz
- Operating speed: 110 km/h (68 mph)

The Chord Line connects Viluppuram Junction and Tiruchirappalli Junction, via Virudhachalam Junction in Tamil Nadu. It is the shortest, busiest and most vital route connecting Chennai Egmore and Southern Tamil Nadu.

== History ==
Until 1927, Viluppuram Junction and Tiruchirappalli Junction were only connected by Main line that traversed through Cuddlaore, Mayiladuthurai, and Thanjavur, which was 240 kilometres (150 mi). Hence, the need for shorter route arose and construction began on 22 August 1927 for a new railway line via Virudhachalam Junction in phases. Initially, the stretch between Viluppuram Junction and Virudhachalam were completed and opened on 1 December 1927, the Srirangam - Golden Rock stretch on 22 August 1927, Bikshandarkoil - Srirangam stretch on 12 December 1927 and the entire stretch began its operations since 1 February 1929. This line gradually reduced the Madras - Colombo journey by around four hours.

== Gauge conversions ==
The conversion from metre gauge to broad gauge was effected during 1992-93 and completed during September 1998.

== Introduction of EMD diesel locomotives ==
10 years post the gauge conversion, in 2008, Southern Railway decided to introduce new advanced hi-tech state-of-the-art passenger-dedicated EMD GT46PAC aka WDP-4 diesel-electric locomotives, powered by a record-breaking 4,000-horsepower (3,000 kW) 16-cylinder 2-stroke EMD 710G3B diesel engine, equipped with a 3-phase AC Traction with a top speed of 180 kmph, to haul some of their top Express services, another reason being the electrification on the Viluppuram-Vriddhachalam-Trichy section was still pending as well. With Krishnarajapuram (KJM) & Hubballi (UBL) diesel loco sheds belonging to South Western Railway zone (SWR) getting more of these locomotives, the then General Manager of SR, Shri V. Anand, took the initiative to speak to SWR, to allot WDP-4 links to the Chord line express services, starting with the pristine Pandian Express, followed by Guruvayur Express, Nellai Express, Pothigai Express and since 2009-10, even Vaigai Express, to train the Piloting Crew of Chennai, Trichy and Madurai railway divisions with EMD locomotives. 4-5 Pairs of WDP-4 locomotives (8-10 locos totally) worked on the Chord Line per day, Individually, with WDP-4 Multiple Units as "twins" supplied occasionally, making it up to 9-11 locos in a day. 2-3 trains on the Electrified Bangalore-Chennai Main Line, including the Sanghamitra Superfast Express (which then ran from Bangalore to Patna via Reversal at Chennai Central), ran on WDP-4 (or WDP-4 Twins occasionally), to supply them to Chennai division. This practice happened until late 2011, when SR's own diesel loco shed at Golden Rock Ponmalai (GOC), belonging to Trichy Division, would begin getting its own passenger hauling EMD WDP-4B locomotives to haul many more further passenger and express services since then.

== Electrification ==
This stretch was proposed for electrification phase by phase by CORE. The electrification was completed during 2010.

== Operations ==
=== Passenger services ===
The line experiences a heaviest traffic handling about 30 passenger and 56 express trains passing through every day in addition to goods train, particularly during night.

=== Freight services ===
The line has a number of Industrial establishments which utilises their nearby railway stations for their logistics and transports such as Central Workshop (Golden Rock), Cement and gypsum factories at Trichy, Perambalur and Ariyalur, and the Sugar factories at Villupuram and Vridhachalam,
