= Mumbai CSMT–Madgaon Tejas Express =

Train in India

Mumbai CSMT – Madgaon Junction Tejas Express
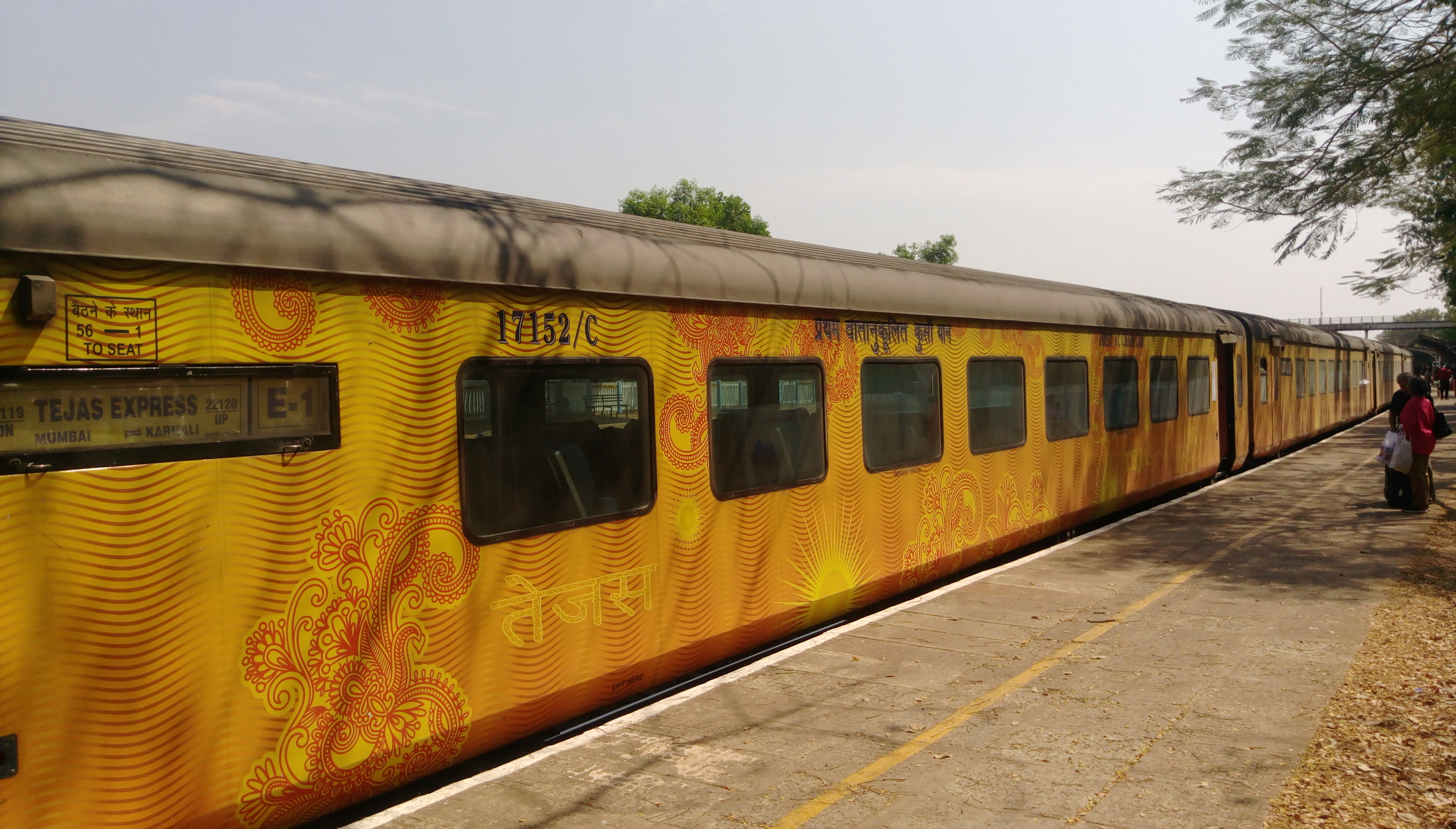
- Mumbai CSMT - Madgaon Tejas Express standing at Karmali.

Overview
- Service type: Tejas Express
- Locale: Maharashtra & Goa
- First service: 22 May 2017; 8 years ago (Inaugural service)
- Current operator: Central Railways

Route
- Termini: Mumbai CSMT (CSMT); Madgaon Junction (MAO)
- Stops: 5
- Distance travelled: 581 km (361 mi)
- Average journey time: 8 hrs 50 mins
- Service frequency: 5 days a week (Note: Except Mondays and Thursdays).
- Train number: 22119 / 22120

On-board services
- Classes: Executive Class, AC Chair Car and Vistadome
- Seating arrangements: Yes
- Sleeping arrangements: No
- Catering facilities: On-board catering
- Observation facilities: Large windows
- Entertainment facilities: Yes
- Baggage facilities: No
- Other facilities: Below the seats

Technical
- Rolling stock: LHB-Tejas
- Track gauge: 1,676 mm (5 ft 6 in)
- Operating speed: 56 km/h (35 mph) average including halts.

The 22119 / 22120 Mumbai CSMT–Madgaon Tejas Express is one of India's full-AC train fleet introduced by Indian Railways connecting Chhatrapati Shivaji Maharaj Terminus in Maharashtra and Madgaon Junction in Goa. It is currently being operated with 22119/22120 train numbers on five days a week basis but during monsoon season the train will run thrice a week. The train route was officially extended from Karmali to Madgaon Junction on 1 November 2022. This is the first Tejas express to be equipped with 2 vistadome coaches on each end.

The coaches are manufactured at the Rail Coach Factory, Kapurthala.

== Service ==
22119/22120 Mumbai Chhatrapati Shivaji Maharaj Terminus–Madgaon Junction Tejas Express currently operates 5 days a week, covering 581 km in 8 hrs 50 mins (66 km/h average speed).

== Traction ==
Even though the route is completely electrified, it is diesel-hauled end to end. A WDP-4D locomotive from the Kalyan shed hauls the train for its entire journey (Earlier was WDP-3A).

== See also ==
- Humsafar Express
- Tejas Express
- Mumbai CSMT - Madgaon Vande Bharat Express
- Madgaon Junction railway station
- Chhatrapati Shivaji Maharaj Terminus

== Sister trains ==
- Lokmanya Tilak Terminus–Karmali AC Superfast Express
- Dadar–Madgaon Jan Shatabdi Express
- Konkan Kanya Express
- Mandovi Express
- Lokmanya Tilak Terminus–Madgaon AC Double Decker Express
