= Pothigai Express =

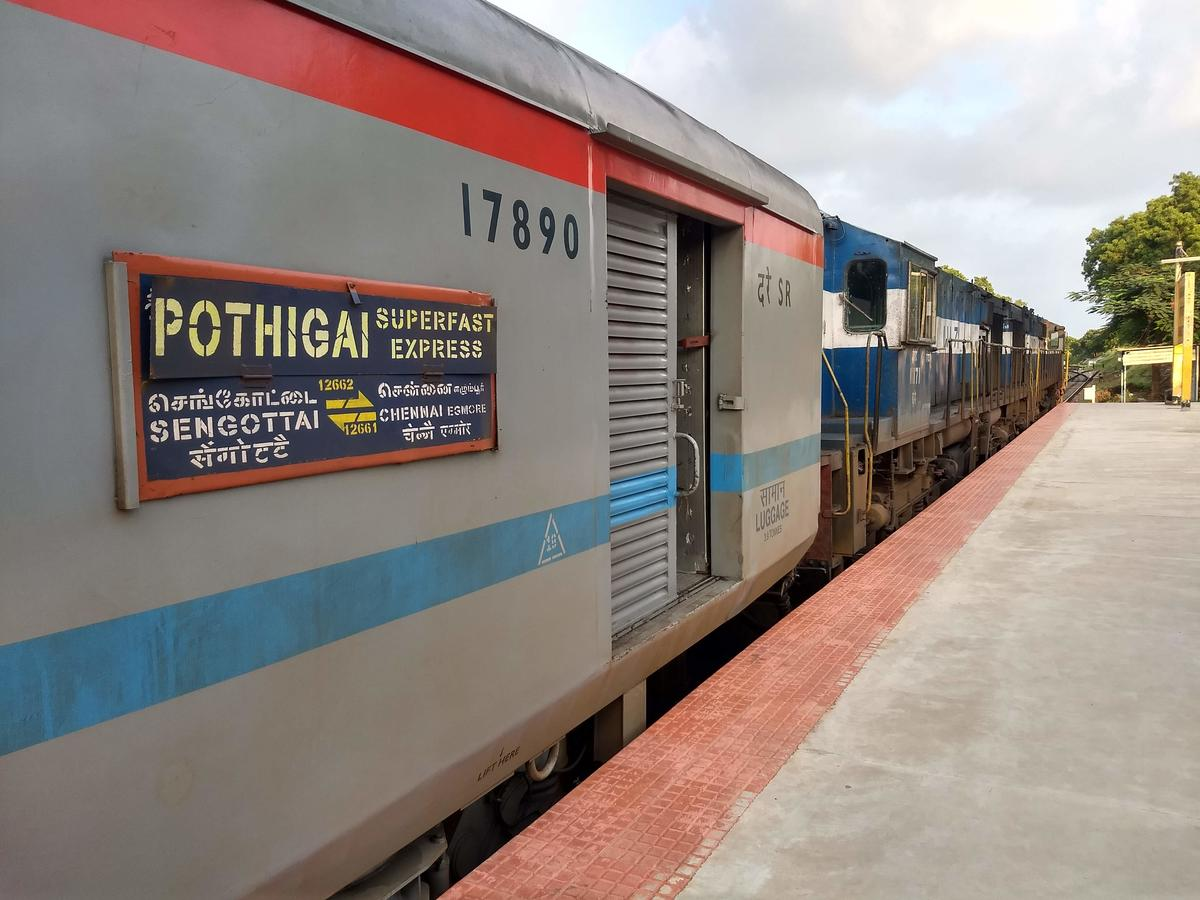
- Pothigai Express is at Sengottai Railway Station

Overview
- Service type: Superfast
- Status: Active
- Locale: Tamil Nadu
- First service: September 20, 2004; 22 years ago
- Current operator: Southern Railway zone
- Ridership: Superfast
- Website: www.indianrailways.gov.in

Route
- Termini: Chennai Egmore (MS); Sengottai (SCT)
- Distance travelled: 667 km (414 mi)
- Average journey time: 11hrs 35min
- Service frequency: Daily
- Train numbers: 12661 (Down); 12662 (Up)

On-board services
- Classes: 2 2nd A/C II Tire (A); 6 3rd A/C III Tire (B); 8 Sleeper (SL); 3 Unreserved (UR); 2 EOG
- Disabled access: Disabled access
- Seating arrangements: Corridor coach (UR/GS only)
- Sleeping arrangements: Couchette car
- Auto-rack arrangements: No
- Catering facilities: e-Catering: 12662 (Sengottai ➡ Madurai Junction); 12661 (Chennai Egmore ➡ Chengalpattu Junction)
- Observation facilities: Large Windows
- Other facilities: CCTV Cameras in all Coaches

Technical
- Rolling stock: MS-SCT WAP-7 from Electric Loco Shed, Royapuram, Erode and Lalaguda; MS-SCT WAP-4 from Electric Loco Shed, Arakkonam & Erode earlier first run was WDP-3A then Golden Rock-based WDG-3A
- Track gauge: 5 ft 6 in (1,676 mm) Broad Gauge
- Electrification: 25kV AC, 50 Hz (High Voltage Traction)
- Operating speed: 67 km/h (42 mph)
- Average length: 22 coaches
- Track owner: Indian Railways
- Timetable number: 21/21A
- Rake maintenance: Tirunelveli Junction
- Rake sharing: Nellai Express (12631/12632)
Route map
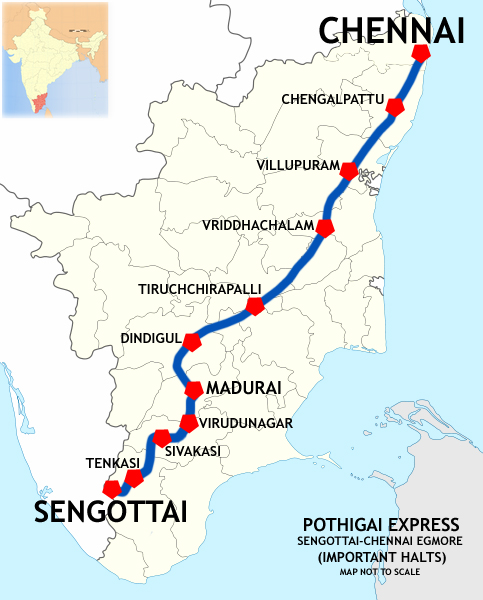

The Pothigai Express is an overnight Superfast train service operated between Chennai Egmore and Sengottai.

From November first, 2023 it has since operated as an electric locomotive. ROYAPURAM WAP7 30357 is the first electric locomotive to pull Pothigai express up to Sengottai after transitioning to an electric model.

== Route ==
The service traverses via Villupuram, Trichy, Madurai, Virudhunagar, Sivakasi, Rajapalayam and Sankarankovil on the Southern Railway zone of the Indian Railways.

== Coach composition ==
the trains consists of 22 LHB coaches below :

Loco	1	2	3	4	5	6	7	8	9	10	11	12	13	14	15	16	17	18	19	20	21	22
	SLR	UR	UR	S8	S7	S6	S5	S4	S3	S2	S1	B5	B4	B3	B2	B1	A2	A1	HA1	UR	UR	EOG

== See also ==
- Vaigai Express
- Pandian Express
- Chennai Egmore–Kanniyakumari Express
- Sethu Express
- Pearl City Express
- Rockfort Express
- Pallavan Express
- Nellai Express
- Chendur Express
- Cholan Express
- Uzhavan Express
- sethu Express
