= Rockfort Express =

Train in India

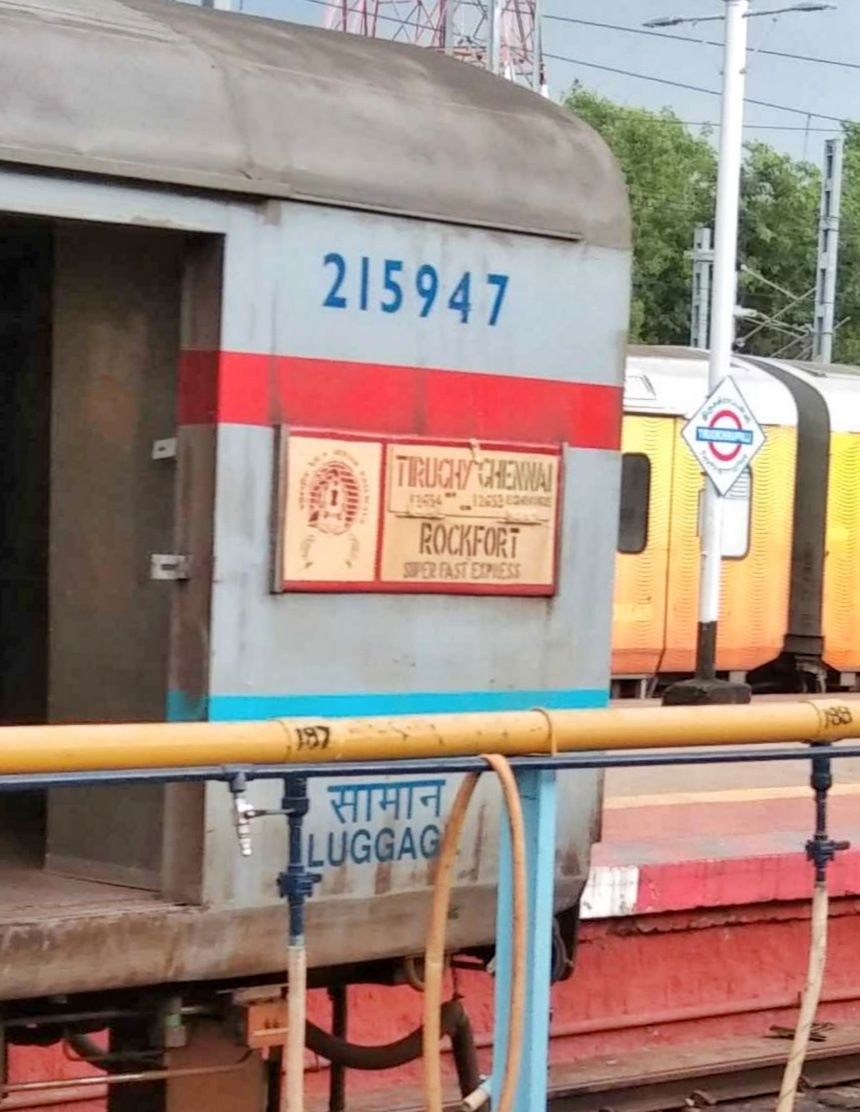
- Rockfort Express at Tiruchirappalli Junction.

Overview
- Service type: Superfast
- Locale: Tamil Nadu
- First service: 1 August 1972; 53 years ago
- Current operator: Southern Railway

Route
- Termini: Tiruchirappalli Junction (TPJ); Chennai Egmore (MS)
- Stops: 11
- Distance travelled: 337 km (209 mi)
- Average journey time: 05hrs 35mins
- Service frequency: Daily
- Train number: 12653 / 12654

On-board services
- Classes: AC first, AC 2 Tier, AC 3 Tier, Sleeper class, General Unreserved
- Disabled access: Disabled access
- Seating arrangements: Yes
- Sleeping arrangements: Yes
- Auto-rack arrangements: Overhead racks
- Catering facilities: Not available
- Observation facilities: Large windows
- Entertainment facilities: No
- Baggage facilities: Available

Technical
- Rolling stock: LHB coach
- Track gauge: 1,676 mm (5 ft 6 in)
- Operating speed: 64 km/h (40 mph) average including halts.
- Rake maintenance: Madurai CDO
- Rake sharing: 12637/12638 Pandian Superfast Express; 22675/22676 Cholan Superfast Express
Route map
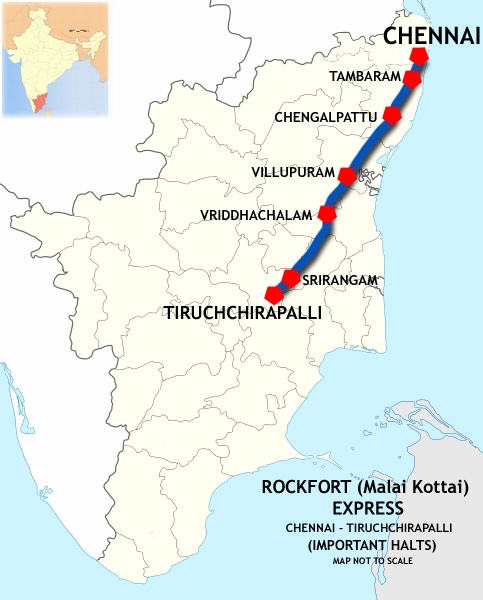

The 12653 / 12654 Rockfort Express is a Superfast Express overnight Express rail connecting Tiruchirappalli with Chennai Egmore via Villupuram in the South Indian state of Tamil Nadu. This train serves as the main connectivity to the state capital Chennai city and Tiruchirappalli city along the route.

== History and Stops ==
The eponymous train is named after the famous 12th-century fortress Rockfort temple in the heart of Tiruchirapalli. The train originally ran between Madras Egmore and Tiruchirappalli Junction on the 'Chord Line'. Later, when the 'Main Line' was closed for operations to facilitate gauge conversion projects, a part of this train was extended to Thanjavur Junction as Rockfort Link Express (6177A/ 6178A). It was further extended to Kumbakonam during the Mahamaham festival. The extended run was truncated effective September 2013. The entire formation now runs up to Tiruchirappalli Junction. Converted as Superfast Express from 08.06.2017 and Renumbered as (12653/12654).

This train originally had a signal-green livery, with a yellow stripe along the upper and lower part of windows. It later was changed to the standard VB Maroon-livery when it was run on the MG. On BG it ran with the Conventional ICF coaches and later it is converted to LHB rake.

Stops :

1. Tiruchchirappalli Town
2. Srirangam
3. Lalgudi
4. Kallakkudi Palanganatham
5. Ariyalur
6. Pennadam
7. Vriddhachalam Junction
8. Villupuram Junction
9. Chengalpattu Junction
10. Tambaram
11. Mambalam

== Rakes ==
The Rockfort Superfast Express is one of the very few prestigious trains in the Indian Railways to have coaches of all the six classes of Indian Railway. It was running with 22 LHB coaches including an AC First Class, AC 2-Tier, First class, AC 3-tier, Sleeper Class and General Sitting compartments. It is nicknamed as VIP Train since its inception, because it's one of the few trains in olden days of IR to have AC compartments and that many famous politicians and wealthy people patronise it. It is also nicknamed Sleep-killer train as this train reaches its destination in both directions in early hours of morning, as a result of speeding up of this train due to double electrified chord line. First Class coaches were removed in May 2014, as per railway policy. New LHB (Linke Hofmann Busch) coaches has been allotted for this train. The train runs with LHB coaches from 26 September 2016, due to this the Composition of the train has been changed to accommodate Generator cars with 22 coaches. Later due to greater demand of Unreserved coaches additional GS was added and now running with 22 same coaches, making it one of few LHB trains to run with 22 coaches. The train usually runs to full capacity. (Note: The coach composition is subject to change.)

== Coach composition ==
In total 22 coaches are there. It includes One AC First Class (1A), AC 2 Tier (2A), AC 3 Tier (3A), Sleeper Class (SL), Unreserved general sitting coach (UR) and End on Generators (EOG). Earlier was WDP-3A pull this train, now WAP 7 and WAP-5 take a turn to pull as the entire route was fully electrified.

Loco	1	2	3	4	5	6	7	8	9	10	11	12	13	14	15	16	17	18	19	20	21	22
	EOG	GS	GS	GS	S7	S6	S5	S4	S3	S2	S1	B6	B5	B4	B3	B2	B1	A3	A2	A1	H1	EOG

== Maintenance ==
The Primary Maintenance of the coaches are managed at SSE/C&W/MDU, there is no Secondary maintenance required.

== See also ==
- Cholan Express
- Pallavan Express
- Tiruchirappalli – Tirunelveli Intercity Express
- Vaigai Superfast Express
- Pandian Superfast Express
- Vascodagama Express
