= Chendur Express =

Train in India

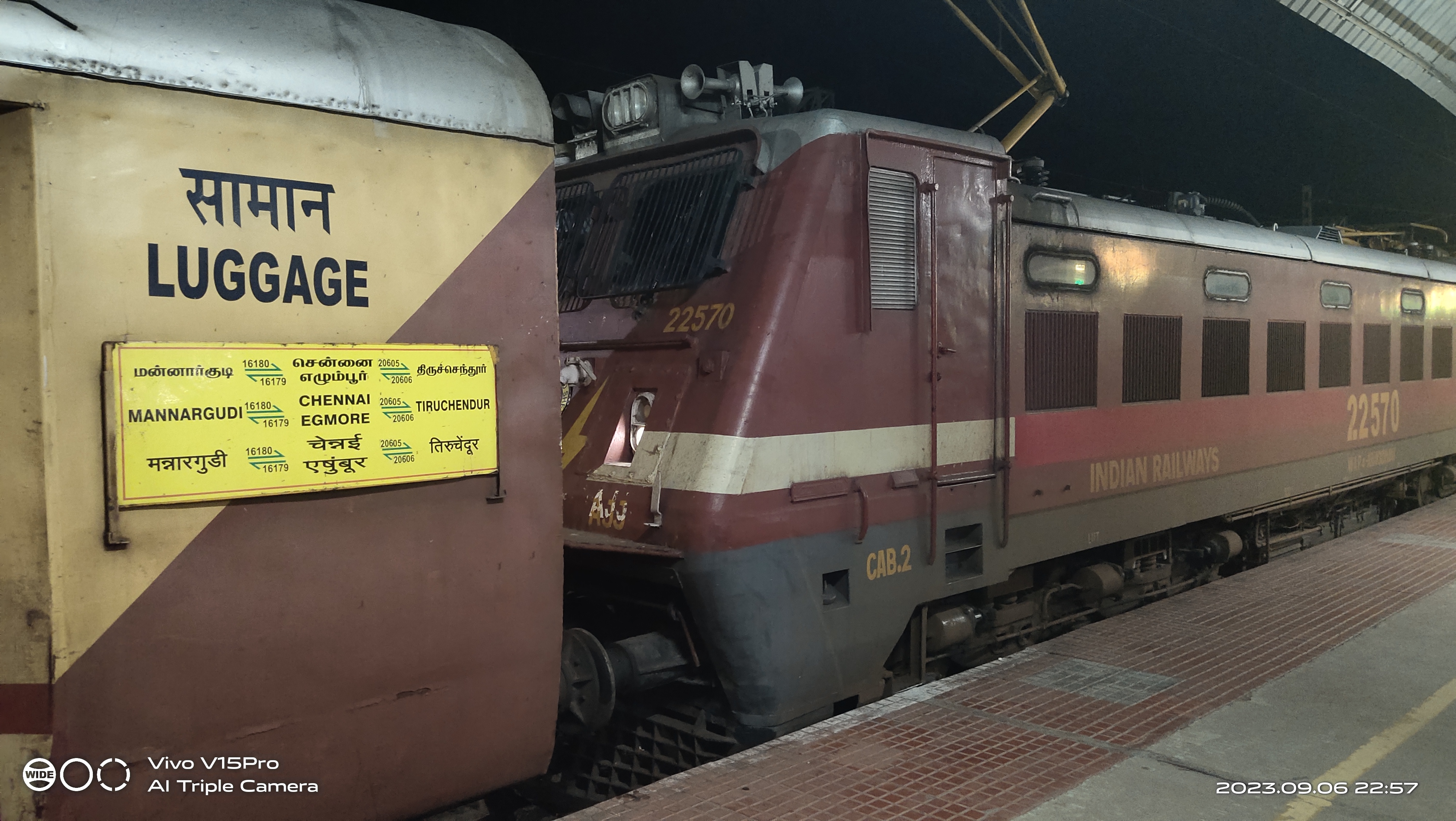
- Chendur Express is at Chennai Egmore Railway Station

Overview
- Service type: Superfast
- Status: Active
- Locale: Tamil Nadu
- Predecessor: CHENNAI THIRUCHENDUR EXPRESS
- First service: 12 February 2009; 17 years ago
- Successor: CHENDUR SUPERFAST EXPRESS
- Current operator: Southern Railway Zone
- Ridership: Superfast

Route
- Termini: Chennai Egmore (MS); Tiruchendur (TCN)
- Stops: 27
- Distance travelled: 776 km
- Average journey time: 14 hours
- Service frequency: Daily
- Train number: 20605 / 20606

On-board services
- Classes: 1 A/C 1st Class (H); 2 2nd A/C II Tire (A); 3 3rd A/C III Tire (B); 11 Sleeper (SL); 4 Unreserved (GS); 2 GSLRD
- Disabled access: Disabled access
- Seating arrangements: Yes
- Sleeping arrangements: Yes
- Catering facilities: On-Board Catering, E-Catering
- Observation facilities: Large windows in all carriages
- Baggage facilities: Overhead racks

Technical
- Rolling stock: MS → TCN: WAP-4 Locomotive from Electric Loco Shed, Erode, Arakkonam; WAP-7lcomotive from Electric Loco Shed, Erode, Royapuram
- Track gauge: 1,676 mm (5 ft 6 in)
- Electrification: 25 kV AC50 Hz (Overhead line)
- Operating speed: 90 km/h (56 mph) (Present service speed); 110 km/h (68 mph) (Maximum Permissible speed)
- Average length: 23 Coaches
- Track owner: Indian Railways
- Timetable number: 21/21A
- Rake maintenance: Rameswaram
- Rake sharing: Sethu Express (22662 / 22661); Tiruchendur – Tirunelveli Passenger (56004 / 56003)
Route map
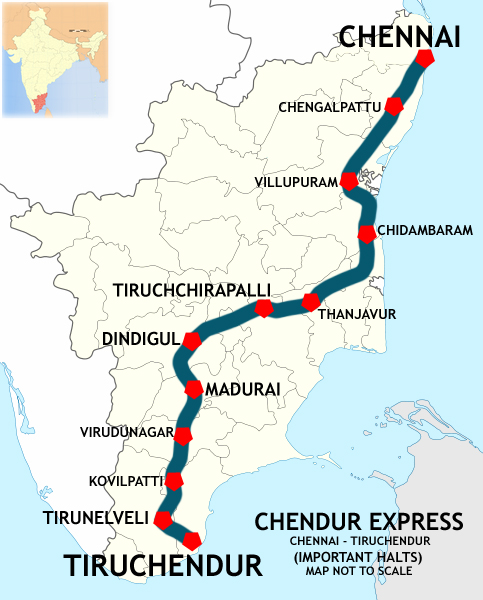

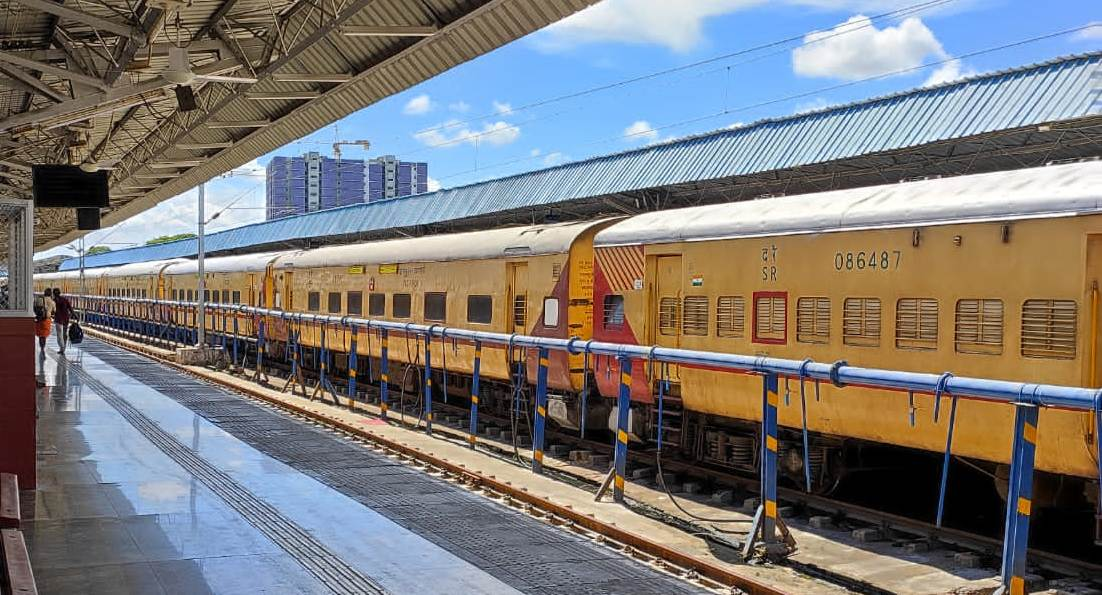
Tiruchendur Express halting at Chennai Egmore

The Chendur Superfast Express is an Express train operated by Southern Railway zone of Indian railways. This train runs between Thiruchendur and Chennai Egmore via Kumbakonam.It is a daily overnight service and an important train of Tiruchendur–Tirunelveli line.

== Route and halts ==
This train is being operated via the main line and hauled by an electric locomotive from Chennai Egmore to Tirunelveli and an electric locomotive from Tirunelveli to Tiruchendur ( full electrification).

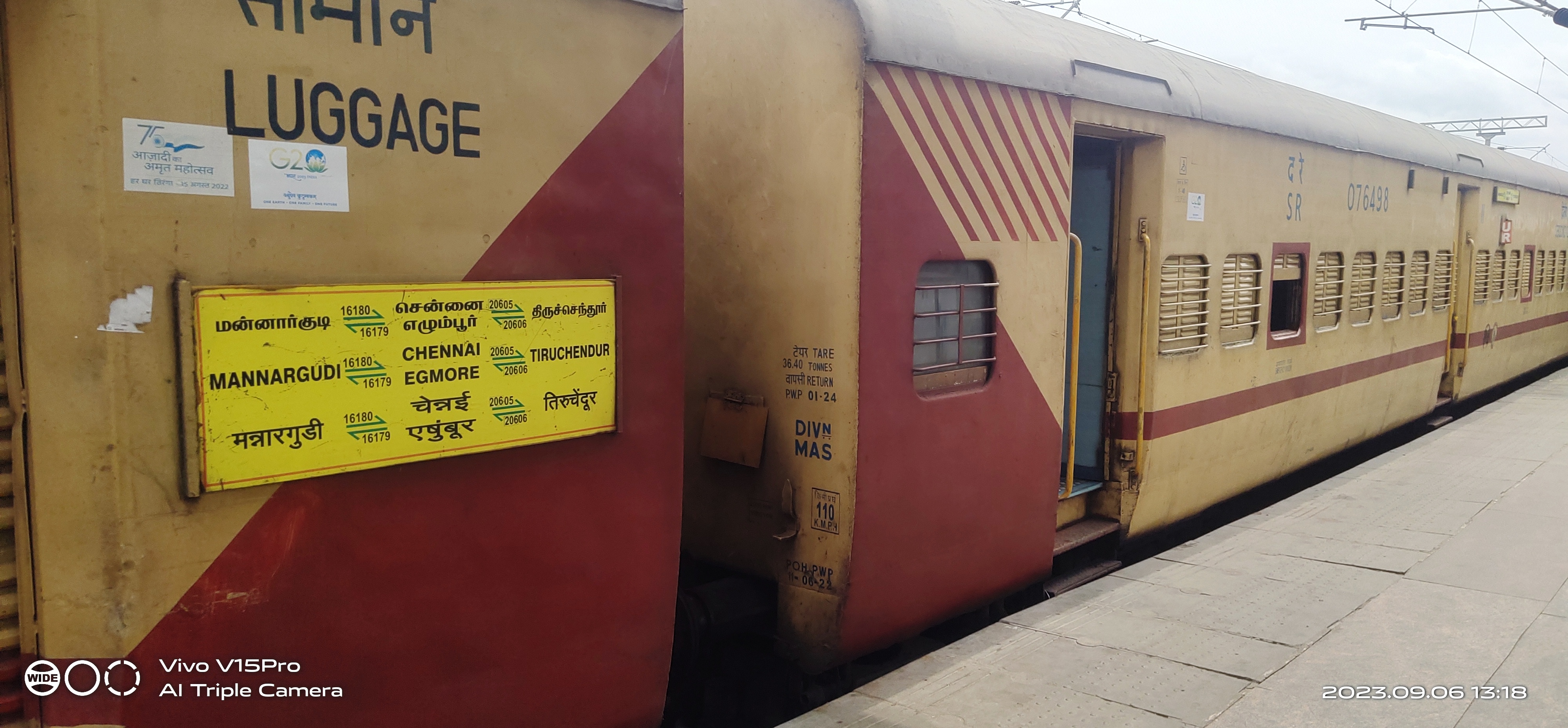
Chendur Superfast Express at Chennai Egmore

== Name ==
It is named after Tiruchendur, a town in the Thoothukudi district of Tamil Nadu.

== Coach composition ==
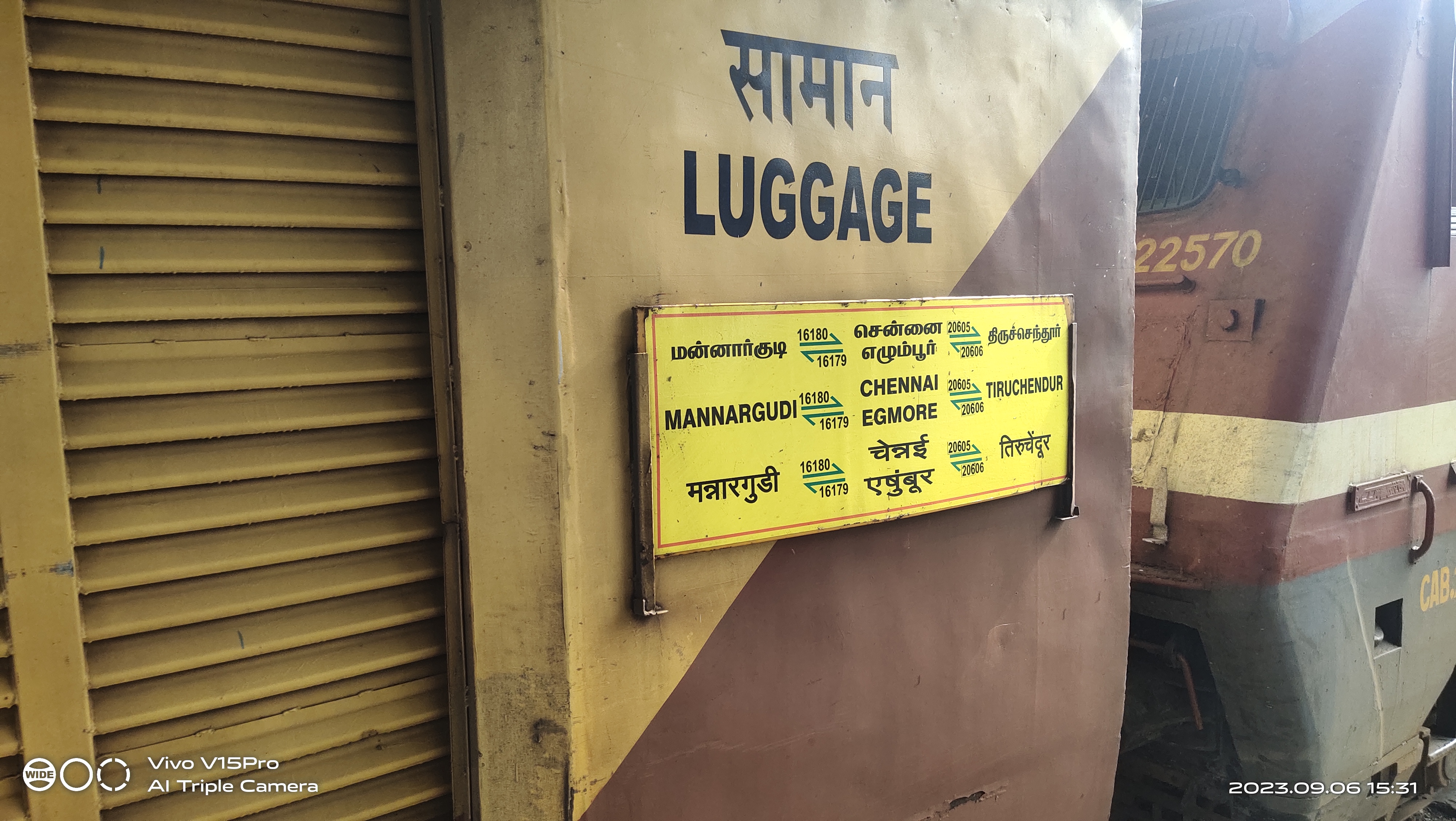

The Chendur Express between Egmore and Tiruchendur has a rake sharing agreement with Mannai Express between Chennai and Mannargudi. These two rakes are used for operating Mannargudi – Mayiladuthurai – Mannargudi and Tiruchendur – Tirunelveli – Tiruchendur passenger trains.

It has one AC First Class cum IInd Class, one Ac Two Tier, one AC Three Tier, nine Sleeper class, four Unreserved general sitting coach.

| Loco | 1 | 2 | 3 | 4 | 5 | 6 | 7 | 8 | 9 | 10 | 11 | 12 | 13 | 14 | 15 | 16 | 17 | 18 |
|---|---|---|---|---|---|---|---|---|---|---|---|---|---|---|---|---|---|---|
| | SLR | UR | UR | H1 | A1 | B1 | S1 | S2 | S3 | S4 | S5 | S6 | S7 | S8 | S9 | UR | UR | SLR |

== See also ==
- Tiruchirappalli–Tirunelveli Intercity Express
- Nellai Express
- Pearl City Express
- Pothigai Express
- Ananthapuri Express
