= Nellai Express =

Train in India

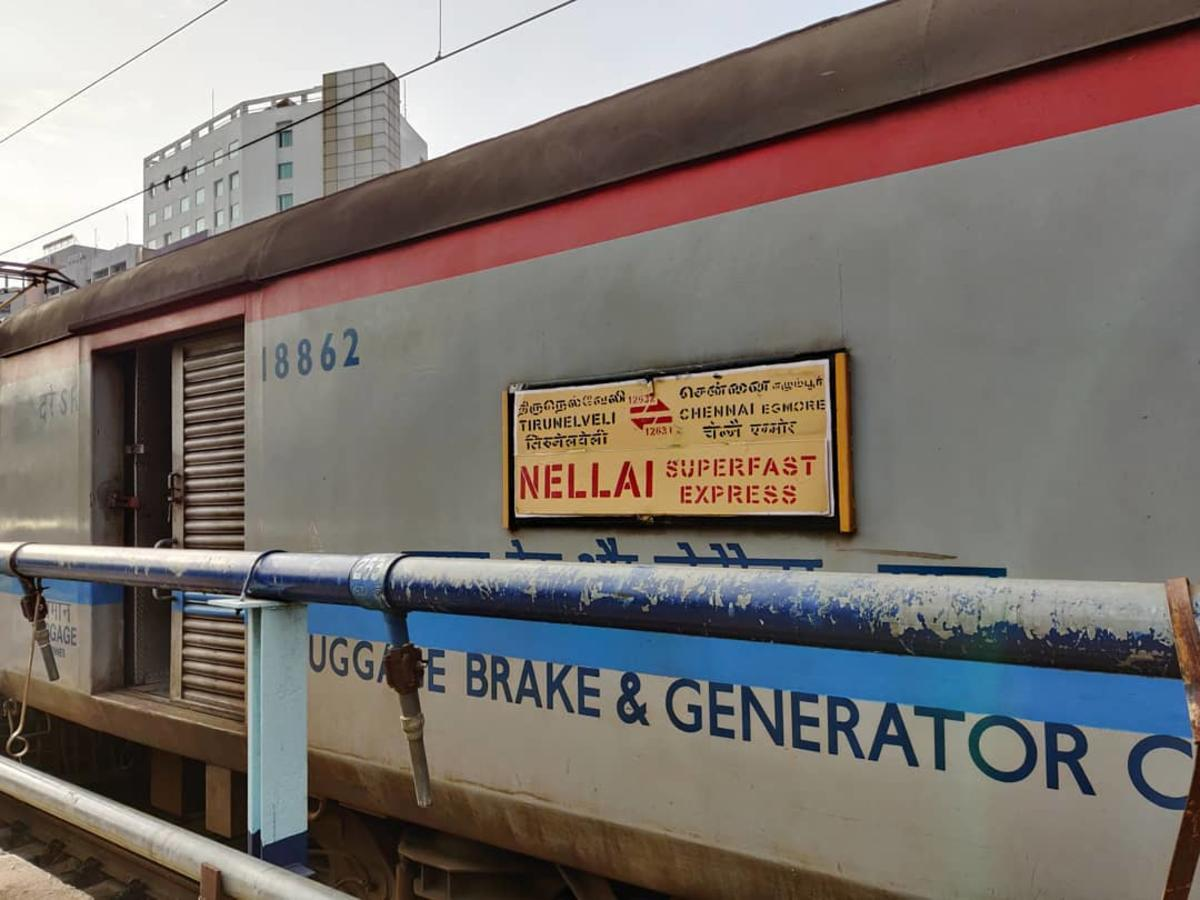
- Nellai Express at Chennai Egmore Railway Station

Overview
- Service type: Superfast
- Status: Active
- Locale: Tamil Nadu
- First service: 13 June 1972; 53 years ago
- Current operator: Southern Railway zone
- Former operator: Indian Railways

Route
- Termini: Chennai Egmore (MS); Tirunelveli Junction (TEN)
- Stops: 12
- Distance travelled: 650 km (400 mi)
- Average journey time: 10 hours, 20 minutes
- Service frequency: Daily
- Train numbers: 12631 (Down); 12632 (Up)
- Lines used: MS ➡ TPJ : Chord Line; TPJ ➡ TEN : Main Line ( Tiruchchirappalli - Thiruvananthapuram Central Line)

On-board services
- Classes: 1 1st A/C cum 2nd A/C II Tire (HA); 2 2A/C II Tire (A); 5 3rd A/C III Tire (B); 9 Sleeper (SL); 4 Unreserved; 2 EOG
- Disabled access: Disabled access
- Seating arrangements: Yes
- Sleeping arrangements: Yes
- Auto-rack arrangements: No
- Catering facilities: On-board catering E-catering
- Observation facilities: Large windows in all carriages
- Entertainment facilities: No
- Baggage facilities: Overhead racks
- Other facilities: CCTV Cameras in all coaches

Technical
- Rolling stock: WAP-7 locomotive from (RPM) Electric Loco Shed, Royapuram
- Track gauge: 1,676 mm (5 ft 6 in)
- Electrification: 25 kV AC, 50 Hz
- Operating speed: 70.5 kilometres per hour (43.8 mph)
- Average length: 22 coaches
- Track owner: Southern Railway zone
- Timetable number: 21/21A
- Rake maintenance: Tirunelveli Junction
- Rake sharing: Pothigai Superfast Express
Route map
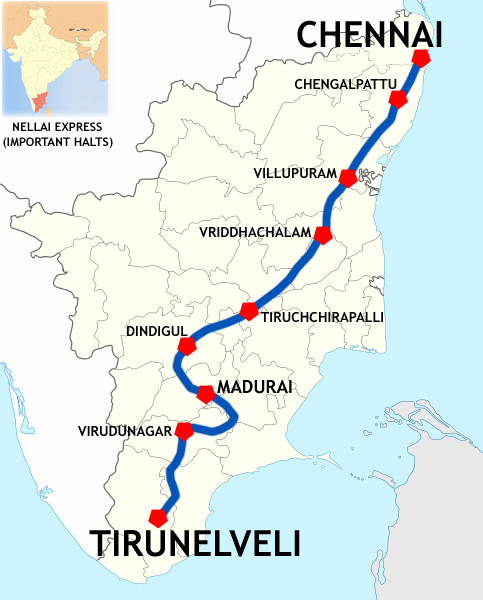

Nellai Express is a Superfast train operated by the Southern Railway zone of the Indian Railways. It runs on all days connecting Chennai Egmore with Tirunelveli Junction via Villupuram Junction, Tiruchirappalli Junction and Madurai Junction through the chord line.

== History ==
The town is also called 'Nellai' after the Nellaiyappar temple in Tirunelveli. Hence, this train from Nellai is named Nellai Express

== Rakes ==
The service has all class of coaches in Indian railways like 1 AC First cum Second AC Coach, 2 AC Two-tier coaches, 6 AC Three-tier coaches, 8 Sleeper Coaches,3 Unreserved and 2 luggage, brake cum generator van. It runs with LHB (Linke Hoffman Busch) coaches and is maintained at Tirunelveli Junction. Earlier was WDP-3A now WAP-7 and WAP-4 pull it

| Loco | 1 | 2 | 3 | 4 | 5 | 6 | 7 | 8 | 9 | 10 | 11 | 12 | 13 | 14 | 15 | 16 | 17 | 18 | 19 | 20 | 21 | 22 |
|---|---|---|---|---|---|---|---|---|---|---|---|---|---|---|---|---|---|---|---|---|---|---|
| | EOG | UR | UR | S8 | S7 | S6 | S5 | S4 | S3 | S2 | S1 | B5 | B4 | B3 | B2 | B1 | A2 | A1 | HA1 | UR | UR | EOG |

== See also ==
- Chennai Egmore–Kanyakumari Express
- Pothigai Express
- Chendur Express
- Pandian Express
- Ananthapuri Express
- Chennai Egmore–Nagercoil Weekly Superfast Express
- Pearl City Express
- Sethu Express
- Rockfort Express
- Nilgiri Express
- Tambaram–Nagercoil Antyodaya Express
