= Chennai Egmore–Kanniyakumari Express =

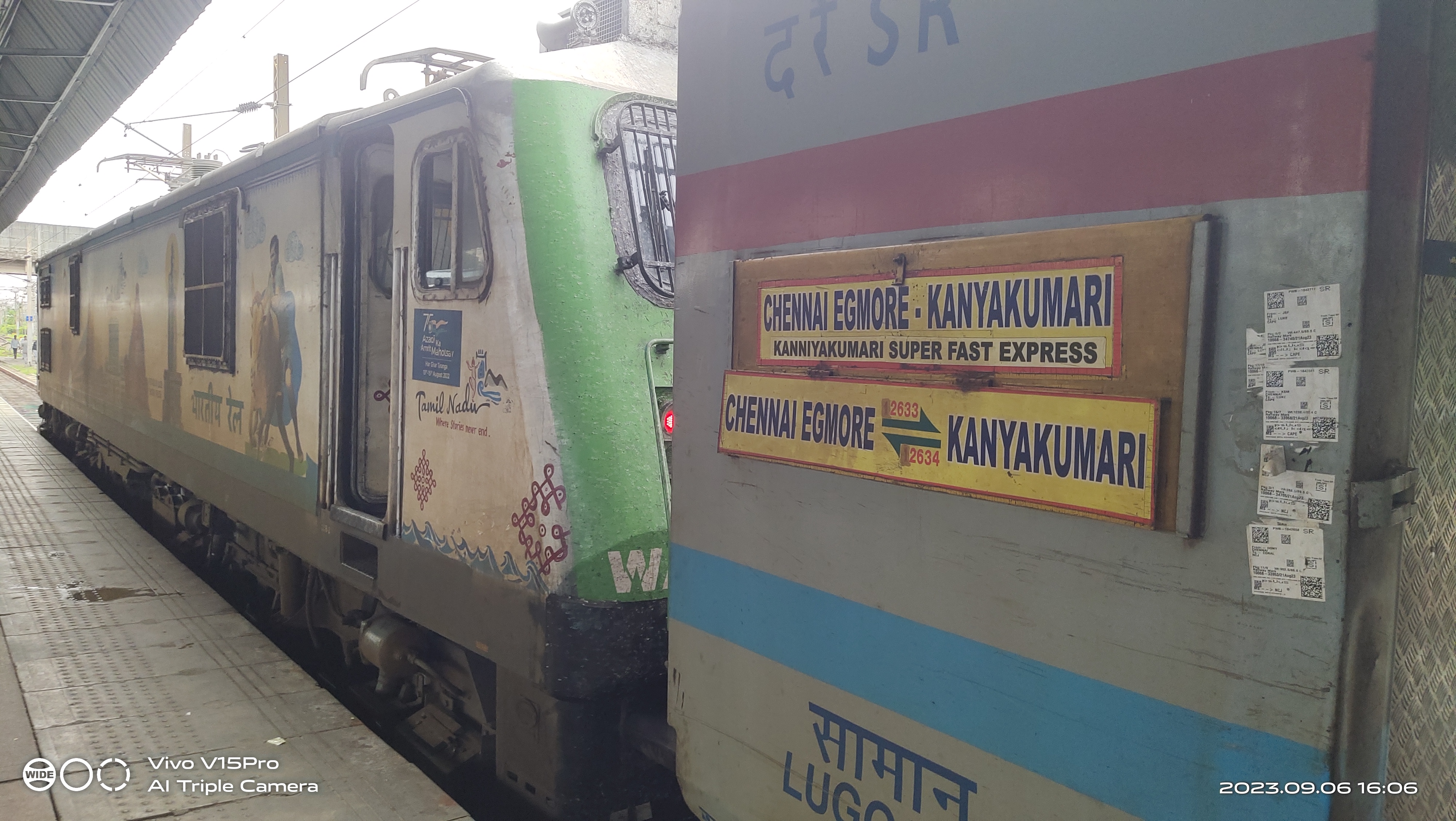
- Kanniyakumari Express At Chennai Egmore

Overview
- Service type: Superfast
- Status: Active
- Locale: Southern Railway zone
- First service: 23 October 1993; 32 years ago
- Successor: -
- Current operator: Southern Railways

Route
- Termini: Chennai Egmore (MS); Kanniyakumari Terminus (CAPE)
- Stops: 13
- Distance travelled: 740 km (460 mi)
- Average journey time: 11 hours 20min
- Service frequency: Daily
- Train number: 12633/12634

On-board services
- Classes: 1 FIRST CLASS A/C (H); 2 2nd A/C II Tire (A); 2 Ac Three Tier Economy (M); 5 3rd A/C III Tire (B); 8 Sleeper (SL); 4 Unreserved (GS); 2 EOG
- Disabled access: Disabled access
- Seating arrangements: Yes (Un-Reserved Coaches)
- Sleeping arrangements: Yes (Berth)
- Catering facilities: On-Board Catering, e-Catering
- Observation facilities: Large windows
- Baggage facilities: Yes
- Other facilities: CCTV camera in all coaches

Technical
- Rolling stock: WAP-7 Locomotive from Electric Loco Shed, Royapuram
- Track gauge: 1,676 mm (5 ft 6 in)
- Electrification: 25kV AC, 50 Hz Overhead Traction
- Operating speed: 70 km/h (43 mph) 130km/h
- Average length: 22 coaches
- Track owner: Indian Railways
- Timetable number: 22/23A
- Rake sharing: Island Express

The Chennai Egmore–Kanniyakumari Express is a Superfast daily overnight train operated by Southern Railway zone of Indian Railways that runs between Chennai Egmore and Kanniyakumari in India. It is currently being operated with 12633/12634 train numbers on a daily basis.

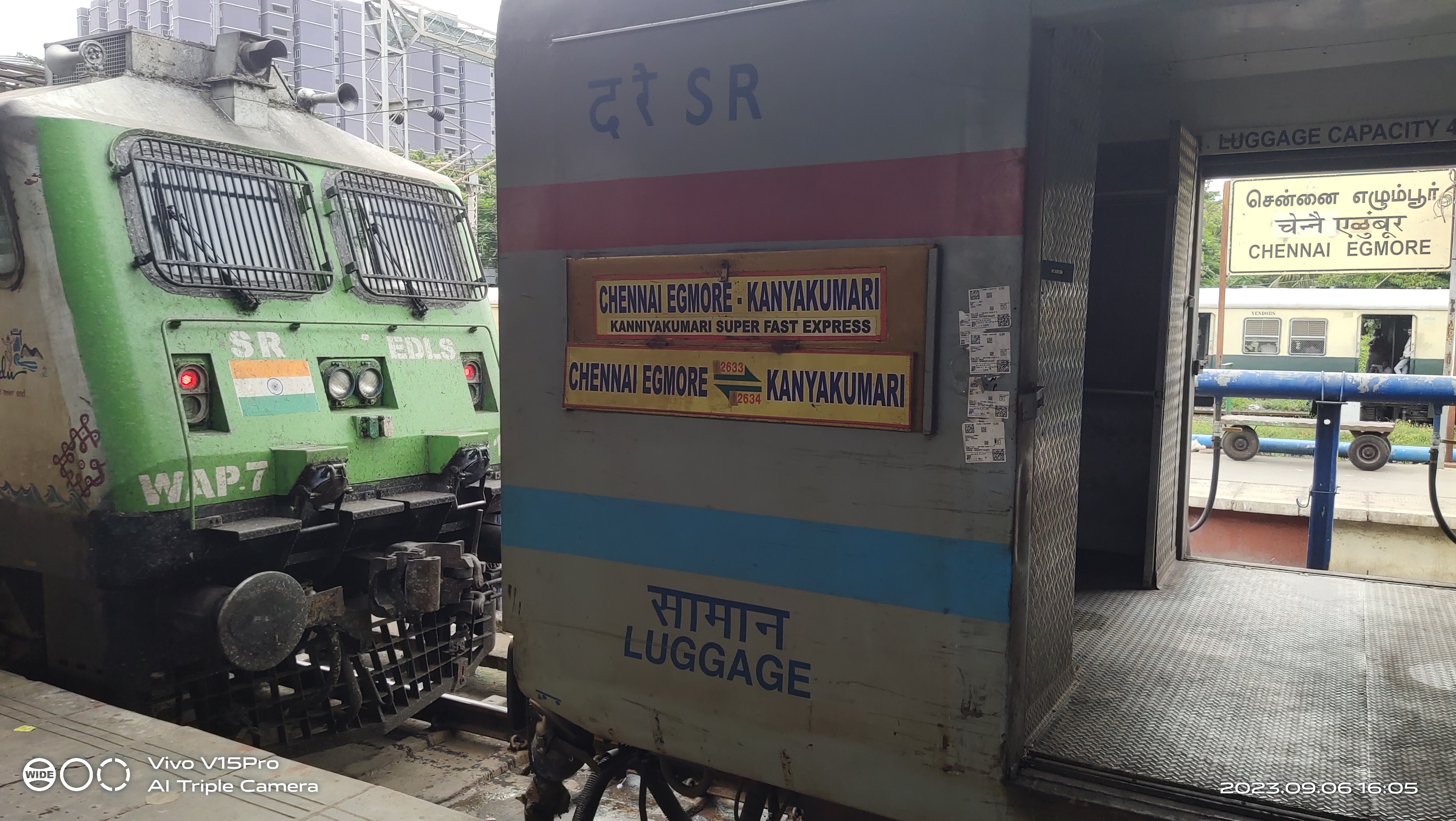

== Service ==
This train runs between Kanyakumari and Chennai Egmore. This is Overnight Superfast Express Train of Southern Railway. This is the fastest train to reach from state capital to kanyakumari.

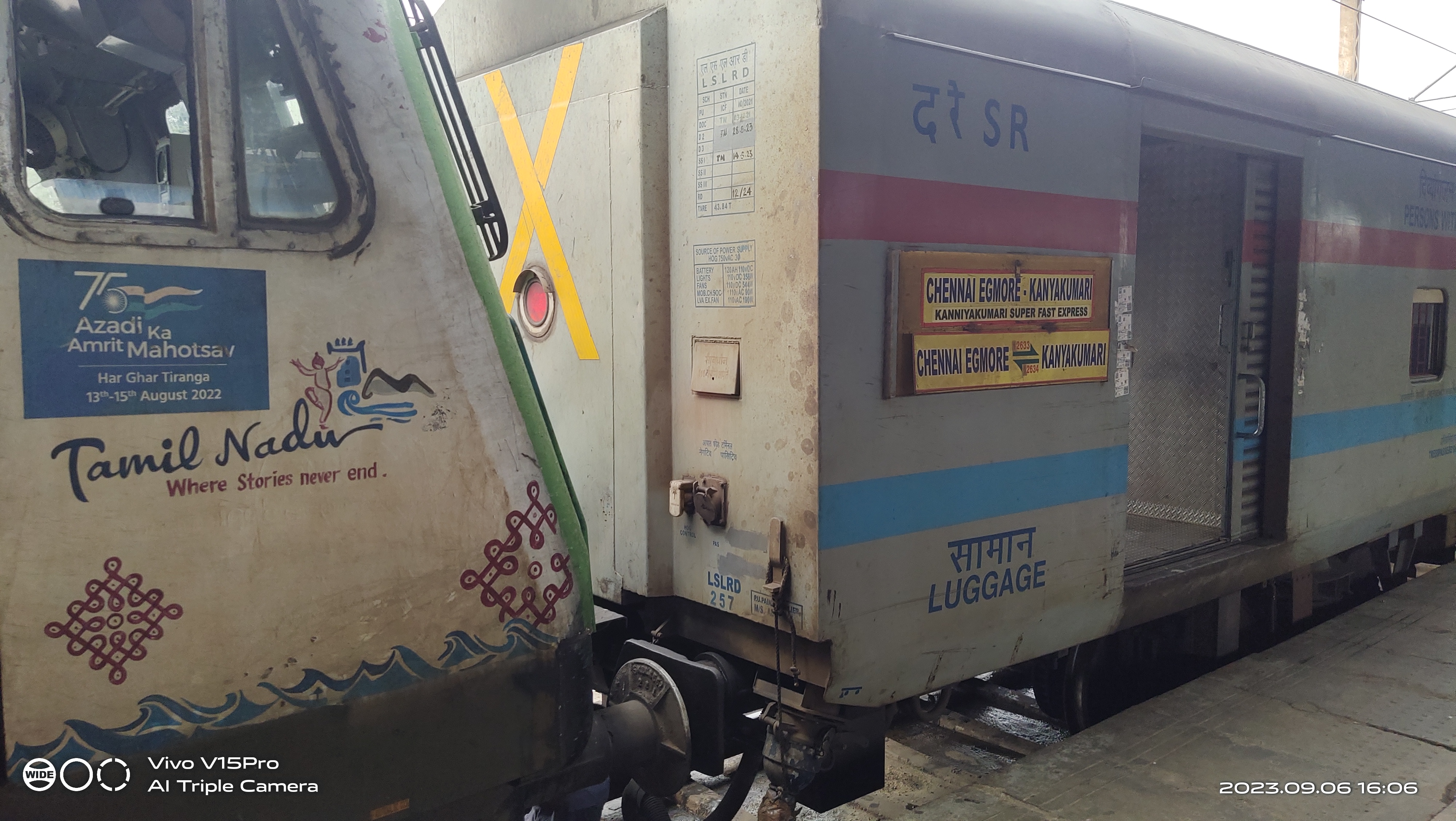

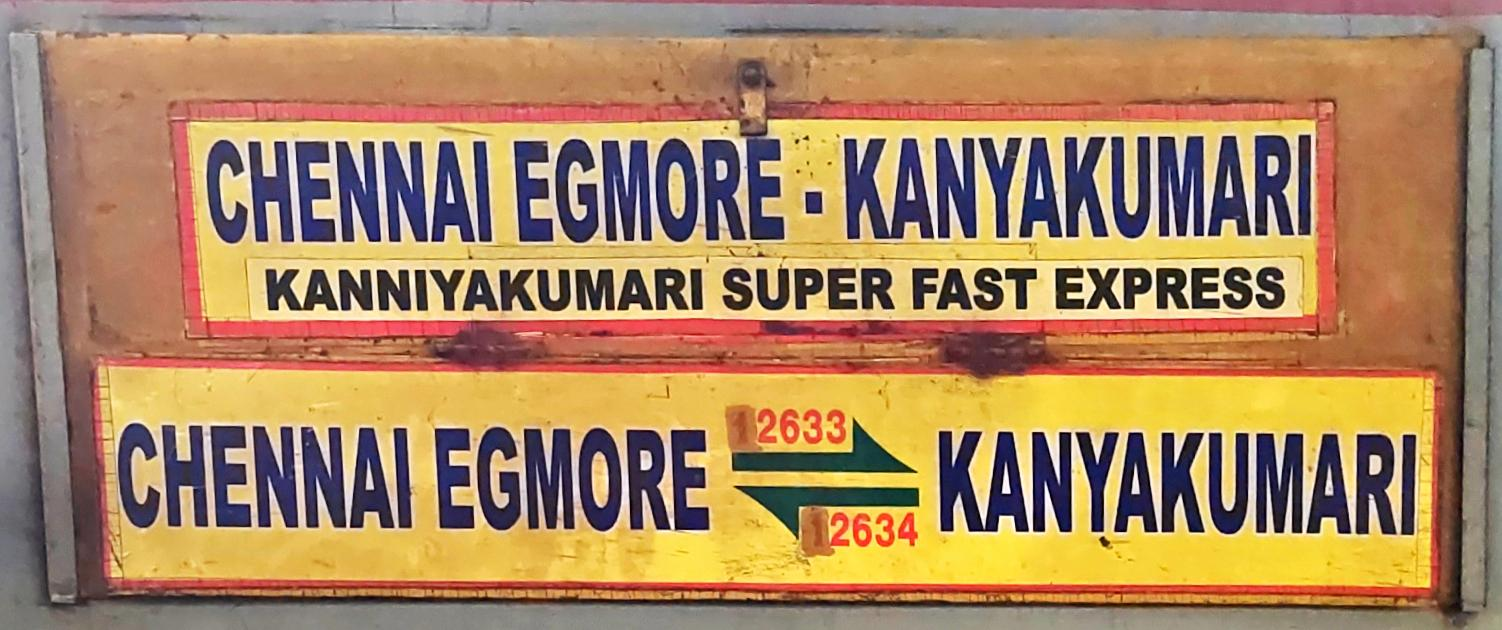

== Coach composition ==
The train has 4 LHB rakes, with each rake consisting of 22 coaches, which includes 7 sleeper class coaches (S1–S7), one A/C 3 tier economy coach (M1), six A/C 3 tier coaches (B1–B6), two A/C 2 tier coaches (A1, A2), one first A/C cum A/C two tier (HA1), and the rest being unreserved coaches. The train has a rake sharing agreement with Island Express.

Loco	1	2	3	4	5	6	7	8	9	10	11	12	13	14	15	16	17	18	19	20	21
	EOG	UR	UR	S9	S8	S7	S6	S5	S4	S3	S2	S1	B4	B3	B2	B1	A2	A1	HA1	UR	EOG

== See also ==
- Pearl City Express
- Nellai Express
- Chennai Egmore–Nagercoil Weekly Superfast Express
- Pandian Express
- Vaigai Express
- Pothigai Express
