= Chemmozhi Express =

Express train in Tamil Nadu, India

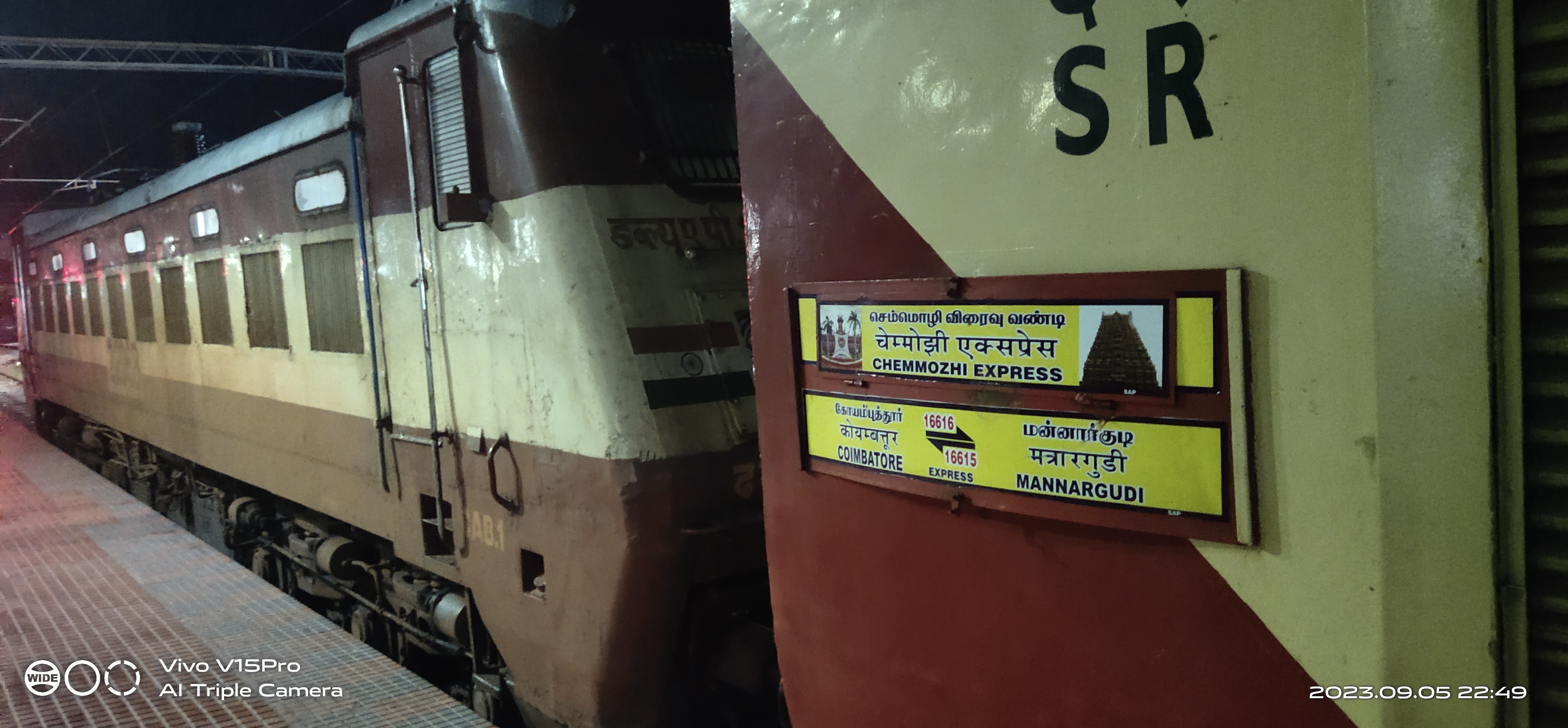
- Chemmozhi Express Express at Tiruchchirappalli Junction

Overview
- Service type: Mail/Express
- Status: Active
- Locale: Southern Railway zone
- First service: 13 June 2013; 11 years ago
- Current operator(s): Southern Railways

Route
- Termini: Mannargudi (MQ); Coimbatore Junction (CBE)
- Stops: 08
- Distance travelled: 335 km (208 mi)
- Average journey time: 08 hours 20min
- Service frequency: Daily
- Train number(s): 16615 (UP); 16616 (Down)

On-board services
- Class(es): 1 1 A/C cum 2nd A/C II Tire (HA); 1 2nd A/C II Tire (A); 2 3rd A/C III Tire (B); 12 Sleeper (SL); 4 Unreserved (GS); 2 GSLRD
- Disabled access: Disabled access
- Seating arrangements: Yes (Un-Reserved Coaches)
- Sleeping arrangements: Yes (Berth)
- Catering facilities: No
- Observation facilities: Large windows
- Baggage facilities: Yes

Technical
- Rolling stock: WAP-1 Locomotive from Electric Loco Shed, Erode
- Track gauge: 1,676 mm (5 ft 6 in)
- Electrification: 25kV AC, 50 Hz Overhead Traction
- Operating speed: 48 km/h (30 mph) 105 km/h
- Average length: 22 coaches
- Track owner(s): Indian Railways
- Timetable number(s): 21/21A
- Rake sharing: Coimbatore-POLLACHI Express

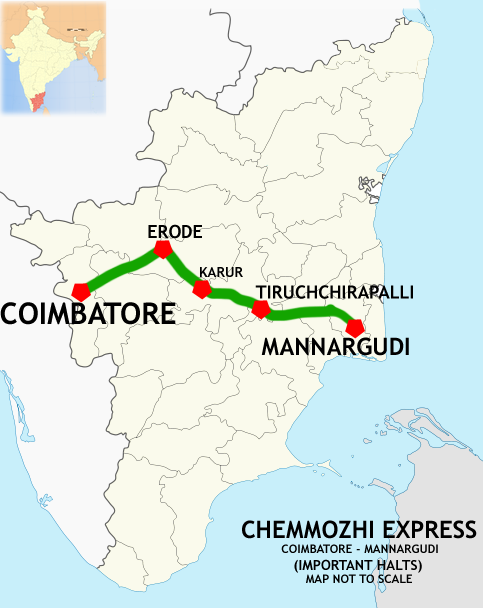
Chemmozhi Express (Coimbatore – Mannargudi) Route map

Chemmozhi Express (Train Nos 16615/16616) is an express daily train run by Indian Railways between Coimbatore city Junction and Mannargudi. The train was named after Chemmozhi Manadu that took place in Coimbatore in 2010. This train passes through Tirupur, Erode, Karur, Tiruchirappalli, Thanjavur and Needamangalam with a total of 6 intermediate stations. The train (numbered 16616) starts at 00:30 from Coimbatore city Junction and reaches Mannargudi at 07:55 on the same day, covering a total distance of 335 kilometres (208 mi). Similarly for return direction, the train (numbered 16615) starts from Mannargudi at 20:20 and reaches Coimbatore City at 04:45 on the next day from the start of journey.

== Schedule ==
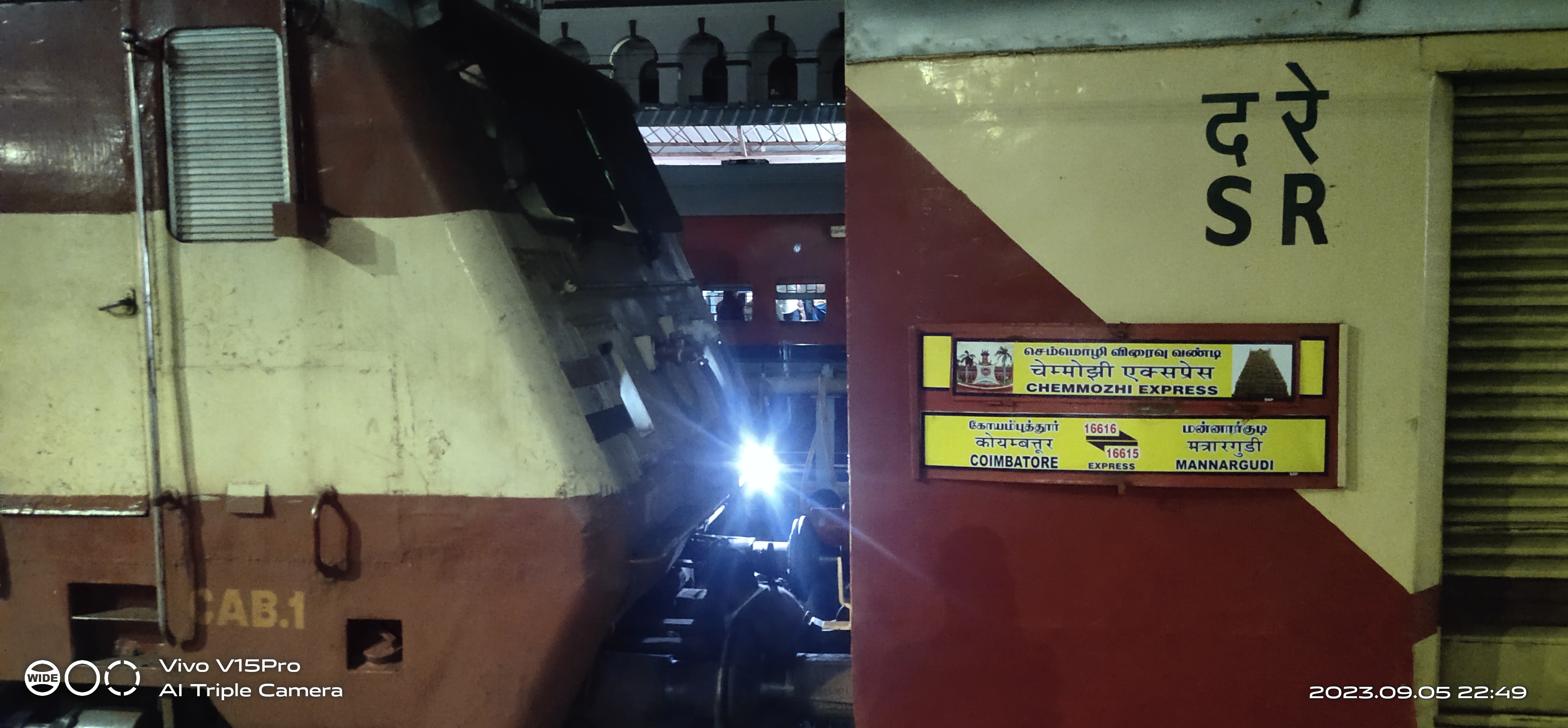

16615 – Mannargudi → Coimbatore ~ Chemmozhi Express
Station/Junction Name	Station Code	Arrival	Departure	Day
Mannargudi	MQ	SOURCE	20:25	1
Nidamangalam Junction	NMJ	20:45	20:55	1
Thanjavur Junction	TJ	21:33	21:35	1
Budalur	BAL	21:52	21:53	1
Tiruchchirappalli Junction	TPJ	22:50	23:00	1
Karur Junction	KRR	00:08	00:10	2
Erode Junction	ED	02:20	02:25	2
Tiruppur	TUP	03:08	03:10	2
Coimbatore North	CBF	03:59	04:00	2
Coimbatore Junction	CBE	04:45	DEST	2
16616 – Coimbatore → Mannargudi ~ Chemmozhi Express
Coimbatore Junction	CBE	SOURCE	00:30	1
Tiruppur	TUP	01:08	01:10	1
Erode Junction	ED	01:50	01:55	1
Karur Junction	KRR	02:58	03:00	1
Tiruchchirappalli Junction	TPJ	04:50	05:00	1
Budalur	BAL	05:29	05:30	1
Thanjavur Junction	TJ	05:58	06:00	1
Nidamangalam Junction	NMJ	06:30	06:40	1
Mannargudi	MQ	07:40	DEST	1

== Coach composition ==
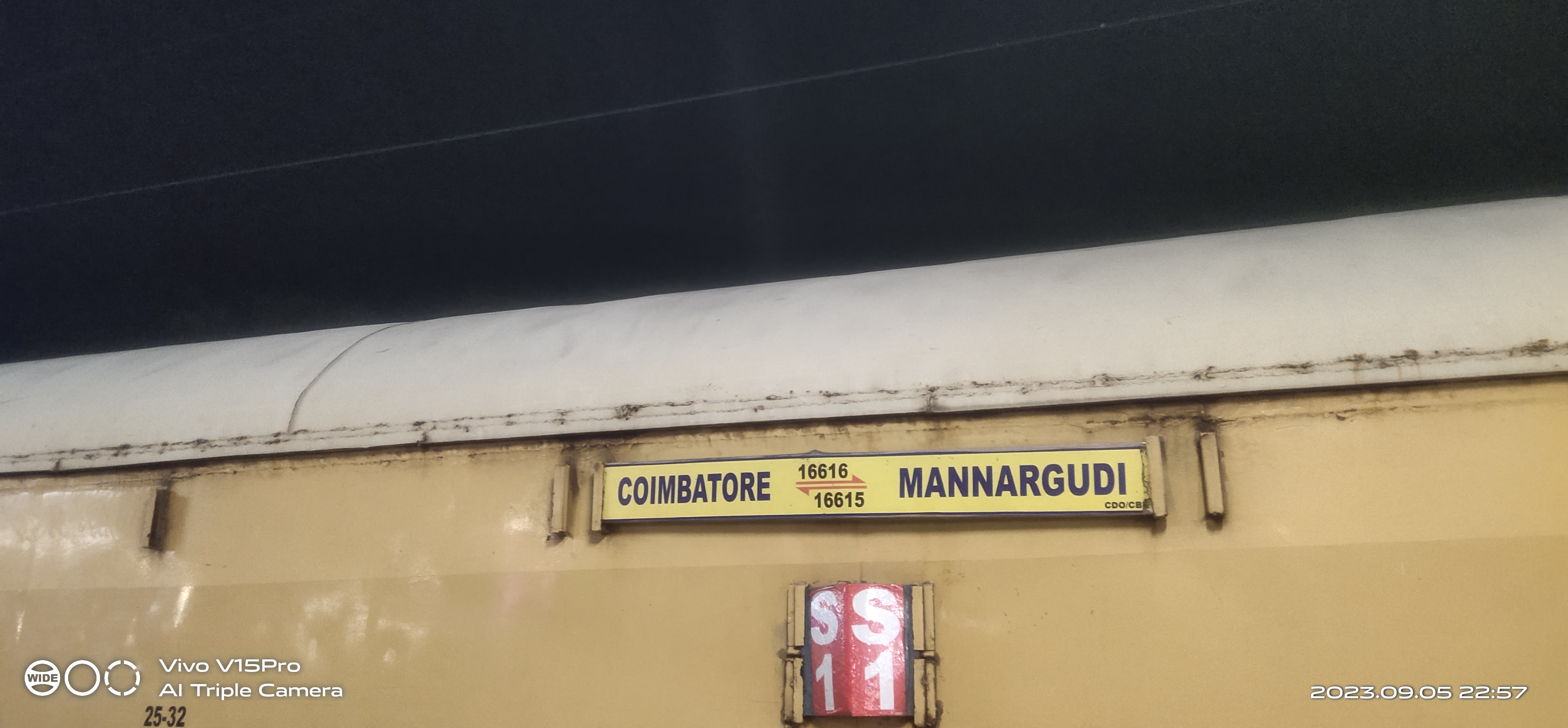

The train runs consists of 22 carriages:

Loco	1	2	3	4	5	6	7	8	9	10	11	12	13	14	15	16	17	18	19	20	21	22
	SLRD	UR	UR	HA1	A1	B1	B2	S12	S11	S10	S9	S8	S7	S6	S5	S4	S3	S2	S1	UR	UR	SLRD

== See also ==
- Pothigai Superfast Express
- Kanniyakumari Superfast Express
- Pearl City (Muthunagar) Superfast Express
- Cholan Superfast Express
- Chendur Superfast Express
- Ananthapuri Express
- Pandian Superfast Express
- Uzhavan Express
- Sethu Superfast Express
- Boat Mail Express
