= Puducherry–Kanniyakumari Weekly Express =

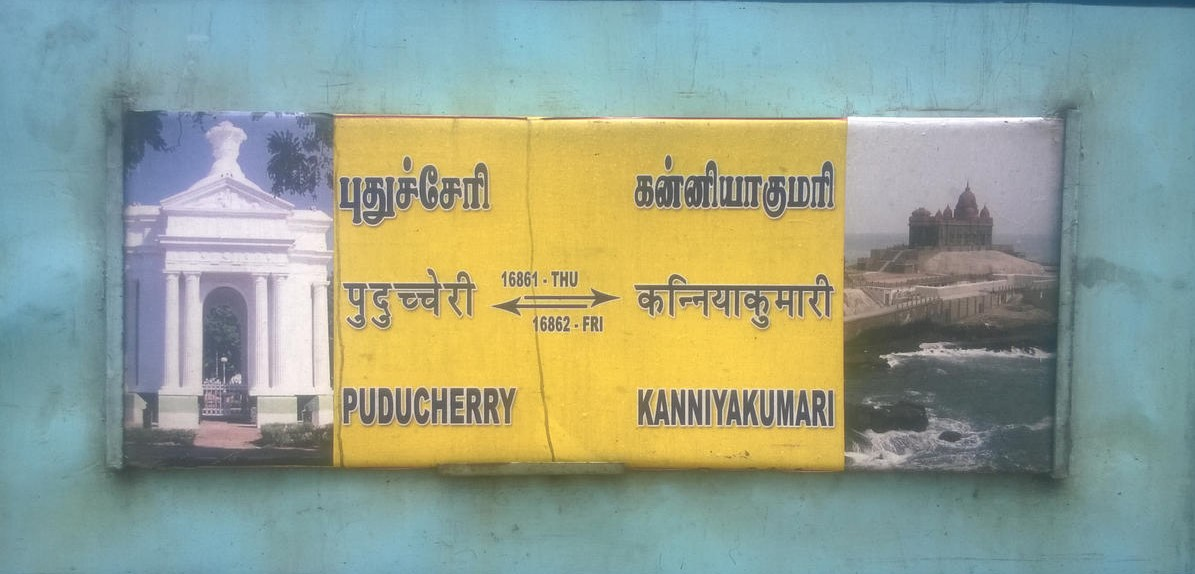

Overview
- Service type: Express
- First service: 18 July 2013; 12 years ago
- Current operator: Southern Railway zone

Route
- Termini: Puducherry (PDY); Kanniyakumari (CAPE)
- Stops: 21
- Distance travelled: 700 km (435 mi)
- Average journey time: 15h 30m
- Service frequency: Weekly
- Train number: 16861/16862

On-board services
- Classes: AC 2 tier, AC 3 tier, Sleeper class, General Unreserved
- Seating arrangements: No
- Sleeping arrangements: Yes
- Catering facilities: On-board catering E-catering
- Observation facilities: Enlarged windows
- Entertainment facilities: No
- Baggage facilities: Below the seats
- Other facilities: Below the seats

Technical
- Rolling stock: 1 ICF coach
- Track gauge: 1,676 mm (5 ft 6 in)
- Electrification: Yes
- Operating speed: 45 km/h (28 mph), including halts

The Puducherry–Kanniyakumari Weekly Express is an Express train belonging to Southern Railway zone that runs between Puducherry and Kanniyakumari in India. It is currently being operated with 16861/16862 train numbers on a weekly basis. It is the first express train that ran on the gauge converted route of Manamadurai–Virudhunagar line. Later Silambu Express extended from Karaikudi Junction via this route till Sengottai.

== Service ==
The 16861/Puducherry–Kanniyakumari Weekly Express has an average speed of 45 km/h and covers 700 km in 15h 30m. The 16862/Kanniyakumari–Puducherry Weekly Express has an average speed of 45 km/h and covers 700 km in 15h 30m.

== Routes and major halts ==
- Puducherry
- Viluppuram junction
- Cuddalore port junction
- Chidambaram
- Mayiladuthurai Junction
- Kumbakonam
- Thanjavur Junction
- Tiruchirappalli Junction
- Pudukkottai
- Karaikudi Junction
- Sivaganga
- Manamadurai Junction
- Aruppukkottai
- Virudhunagar Junction
- Sattur
- Kovilpatti
- Tirunelveli Junction
- Nagercoil Junction
- Kanniyakumari Terminus

== See also ==
- Puducherry railway station
- Kanniyakumari railway station
