= Thamirabarani Express =

Indian express train

Tambaram - Sengottai Tri-weekly East delta Superfast Express
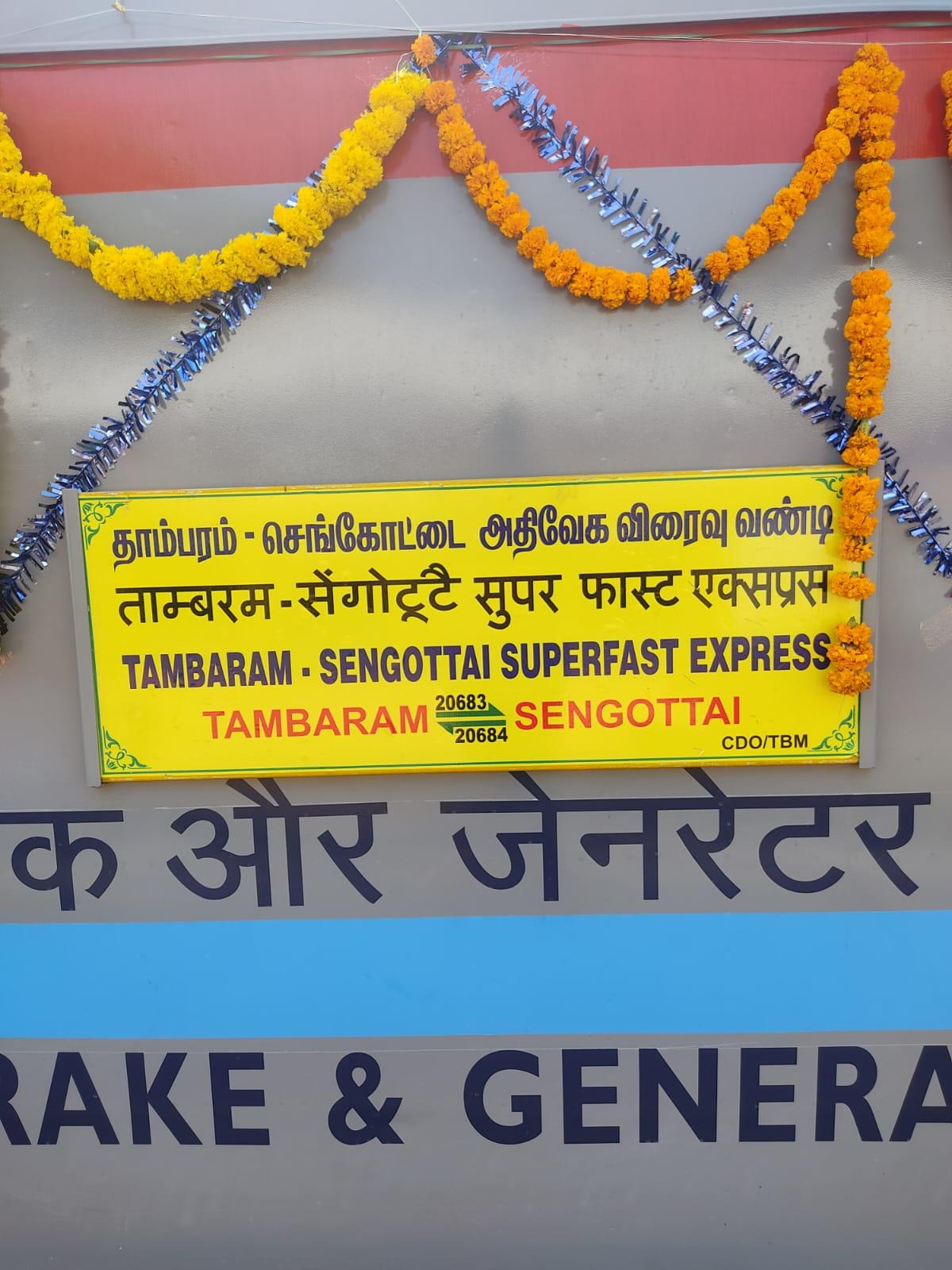

Overview
- Service type: Superfast Express
- Status: Active
- First service: 08/04/2023
- Current operator: Southern Railway zone

Route
- Termini: Tambaram (TBM); Sengottai (SCT)
- Stops: 16
- Distance travelled: 750.29 km (466.21 mi)
- Average journey time: 14 hrs (Approx.)
- Service frequency: Tri-weekly
- Train number: 20683/20684

On-board services
- Seating arrangements: Yes
- Sleeping arrangements: Yes
- Catering facilities: No
- Observation facilities: Large windows
- Entertainment facilities: No
- Baggage facilities: Yes
- Other facilities: Charger Outlets

Technical
- Rolling stock: 1
- Track gauge: 1,676 mm (5 ft 6 in)
- Electrification: Fully Electrified
- Operating speed: 55 kmph (Avg.)

Tambaram - Sengottai Tri-weekly East delta Superfast Express is an express train of the Indian Railways connecting Tambaram in the South Indian metropolis of Chennai, Tamil Nadu with Sengottai in Tenkasi district of Tamil Nadu. It is operating as a tri weekly East delta super fast express train via Tiruturaipoondi Junction, Aruppukkottai, Tirunelveli Junction with 20683/20684 train numbers. It is the third longest running train within Tamil Nadu by traveling 750 km. It has been inaugurated by the Prime Minister of India on 08/04/2023.

Upon inaugural, the train numbered 20683 is to be operated as weekly train departing at 21 Hrs from Tambaram railway station every Sunday and reach Sengottai at 10:50 Hrs the next day. The return train numbered 20684 will depart Sengottai at 16:15 Hrs every Monday and reach Tambaram next day at 6:05 Hrs. It is Mainly For The Thirunelveli -Tenkasi section, karaikudi - thiruvarur section and Aruppukottai People to Connect With The State Capital Chennai.

== Coach Composition ==
It has 17 coaches with single dedicated LHB Coach rake. It has

1. 1 SLR
2. 1 EOG
3. 3 General Unreserved Coach
4. 2 AC 2 Tire Coach
5. 5 AC 3 Tire Economy Coach
6. 5 Non AC Sleeper Coach

== Stoppages ==
1. Tambaram
2. Villupuram junction
3. Tirupadripuliyur
4. Mayiladuthurai Junction
5. Thiruvarur Junction
6. Tiruturaipundi Junction
7. Muthupet
8. Pattukkottai
9. Aranthangi
10. Karaikudi Junction
11. Manamadurai Junction (Technical Halt only)
12. Aruppukkottai
13. Virudhunagar Junction
14. Tirunelveli Junction
15. Cheranmahadevi
16. Kallidaikurichi
17. Ambasamudram
18. Paavurchattiram
19. Tenkasi Junction
20. Sengottai

== Traction ==
A Royapuram Based WAP - 7 hauls the train from Tambaram to Sengottai as the route is electrified as of oct 2026.

== See also ==
- Silambu Express
- Pothigai Express
- Nellai Express
