= Tiruchchuli Railway station =

Railway station in Tamil Nadu, India

Tiruchchuli
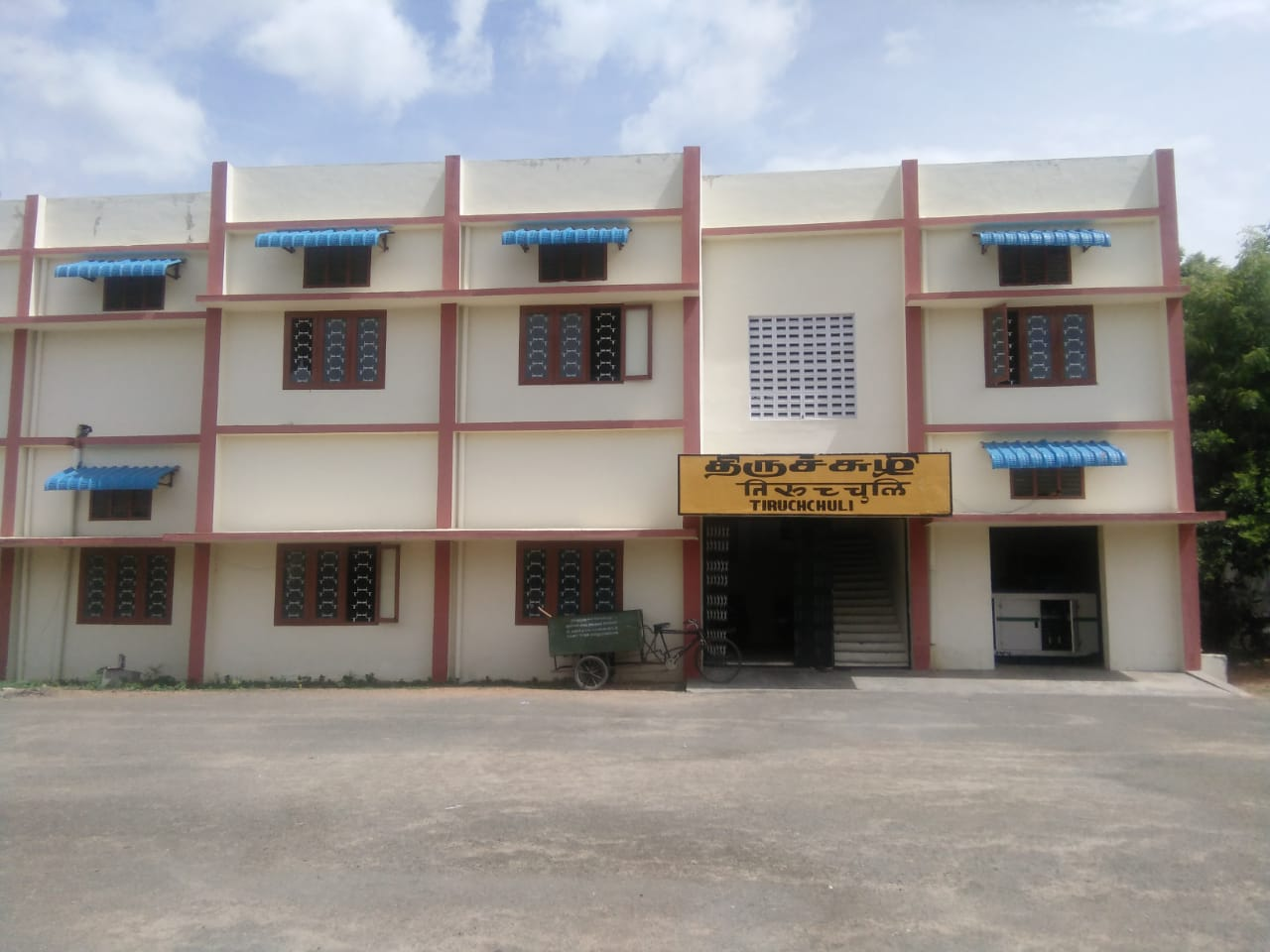
- The Main Entrance of the Station

General information
- Location: Tiruchchuli, Tamil Nadu; India
- Coordinates: 9.537875791321635°N 78.19886809676991°E
- Elevation: 64 metres (210 ft)
- System: Express train, commuter rail and Passenger train station
- Owner: Indian Railway
- Operator: Southern Railway zone
- Line: Manamadurai–Virudhunagar line
- Platforms: 3
- Tracks: 3

Construction
- Structure type: Elevated
- Parking: Yes

Other information
- Status: Functioning
- Station code: TCH
- Zone(s): Southern Railway zone
- Division(s): Madurai
- Fare zone: Southern Railway zone

History
- Opened: 1964; 62 years ago
- Rebuilt: 2013; 13 years ago

Passengers
- 2022–23: 4,752 per year 13 per day
Route map
Location
- Location within Tamil Nadu

Tiruchchuli railway station (station code:TCH) is an NSG–6 category Indian railway station in Madurai railway division of Southern Railway zone. It serves Tiruchuli, located in Virudhunagar district of the Indian state of Tamil Nadu.

A new railway line from Manamadurai Junction–Virudhunagar Junction Via Aruppukkottai was proposed in the Third Five Year plan, which was supposed to ease the pressure on the existing Manamadurai Junction–Madurai Junction and Madurai Junction–Virudhunagar Junction sections. On 1 September 1963, the 22.66 kilometres (14.08 mi) Virudhunagar Junction – Aruppukkottai section was opened, along with Aruppukkottai railway station in the same year by the then Chief Minister of Tamil Nadu, K. Kamaraj. And on 2 May 1964, the rest of 43.89 kilometres (27.27 mi) Aruppukkottai – Manamadurai Junction section along with Tiruchchuli railway station opened for traffic. Opened with meter gauge tracks, the 67 kilometres (42 mi) This station catering immensely the passengers of the region and Tuticorin for traffic of goods.

== Performance and earnings ==
For the FY 2022–23, the annual earnings of the station was ₹145,895 (US$1,600) and daily earnings was ₹400 (US$4.30). For the same financial year, the annual passenger count was 4,752 and daily count was 13. While, the footfall per day was recorded as 21.
