= Sethu Express =

Train in India

Sethu Superfast Express
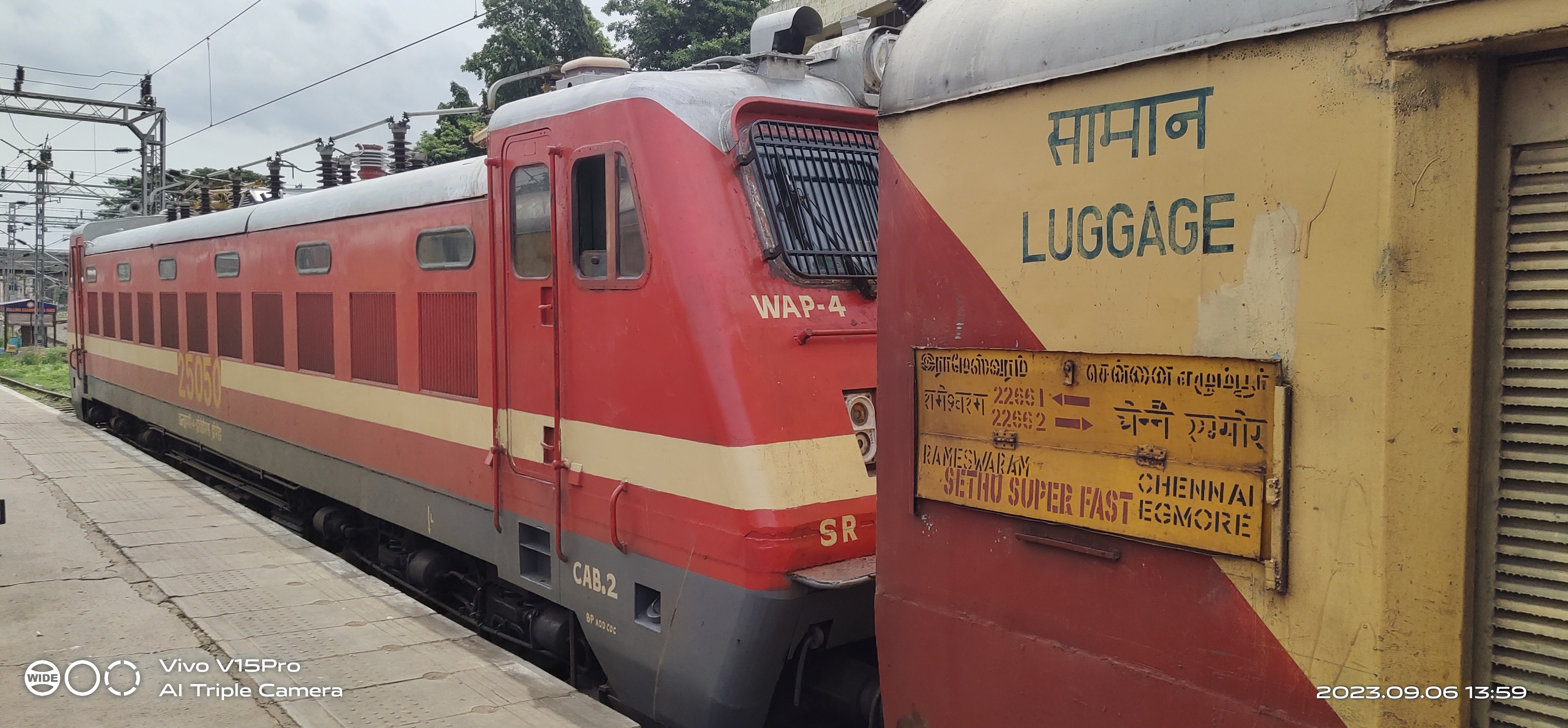
- Sethu Superfast Express at Chennai Egmore.

Overview
- Service type: Superfast
- Locale: Tamil Nadu
- Current operator: Southern Railway

Route
- Termini: Chennai Egmore (MS); Rameswaram (RMM)
- Stops: 15
- Distance travelled: 603 km (375 mi)
- Average journey time: 9 hrs 30 mins
- Service frequency: Daily
- Train number: 22661 / 22662

On-board services
- Classes: AC First, AC 2 Tier, AC 3 Tier, Sleeper Class, General Unreserved
- Seating arrangements: Yes
- Sleeping arrangements: Yes
- Catering facilities: E-Catering, On-board catering
- Observation facilities: Large windows
- Baggage facilities: No
- Other facilities: Below the seats

Technical
- Rolling stock: ICF coach after October 19 LHB coach
- Track gauge: 1,676 mm (5 ft 6 in); Broad Gauge
- Operating speed: 62 km/h (39 mph) average including halts.
- Rake maintenance: Rameswaram
- Rake sharing: Chendur Express (20605 / 20606)
Route map
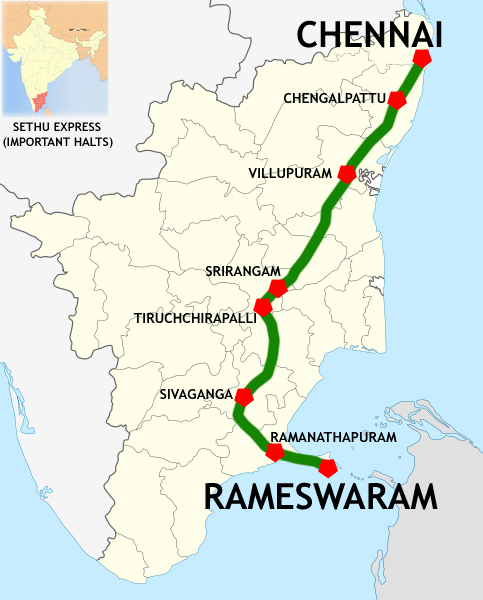

The 22661 / 22662 Sethu Superfast Express is a Superfast train of the Southern Railway zone of the Indian Railways and runs between Chennai Egmore and Rameswaram via Chord line and Tiruchirapalli - Karaikudi - Manamadurai Branch line. It is a standard train consisting of 23 coaches. The train covers a distance of 603 km (375 mi) with an average speed of 69 km/h (43 mph).

== Etymology ==
The King of Ramanathapuram Samasthanam (Princely State) in Tamil Nadu bore the title Sethupathy. So the train running through this princely territory is named as Sethu express

The other reason being it connects the peninsular sub continental India with the Island city of Rameshwaram using the Pamban bridge.

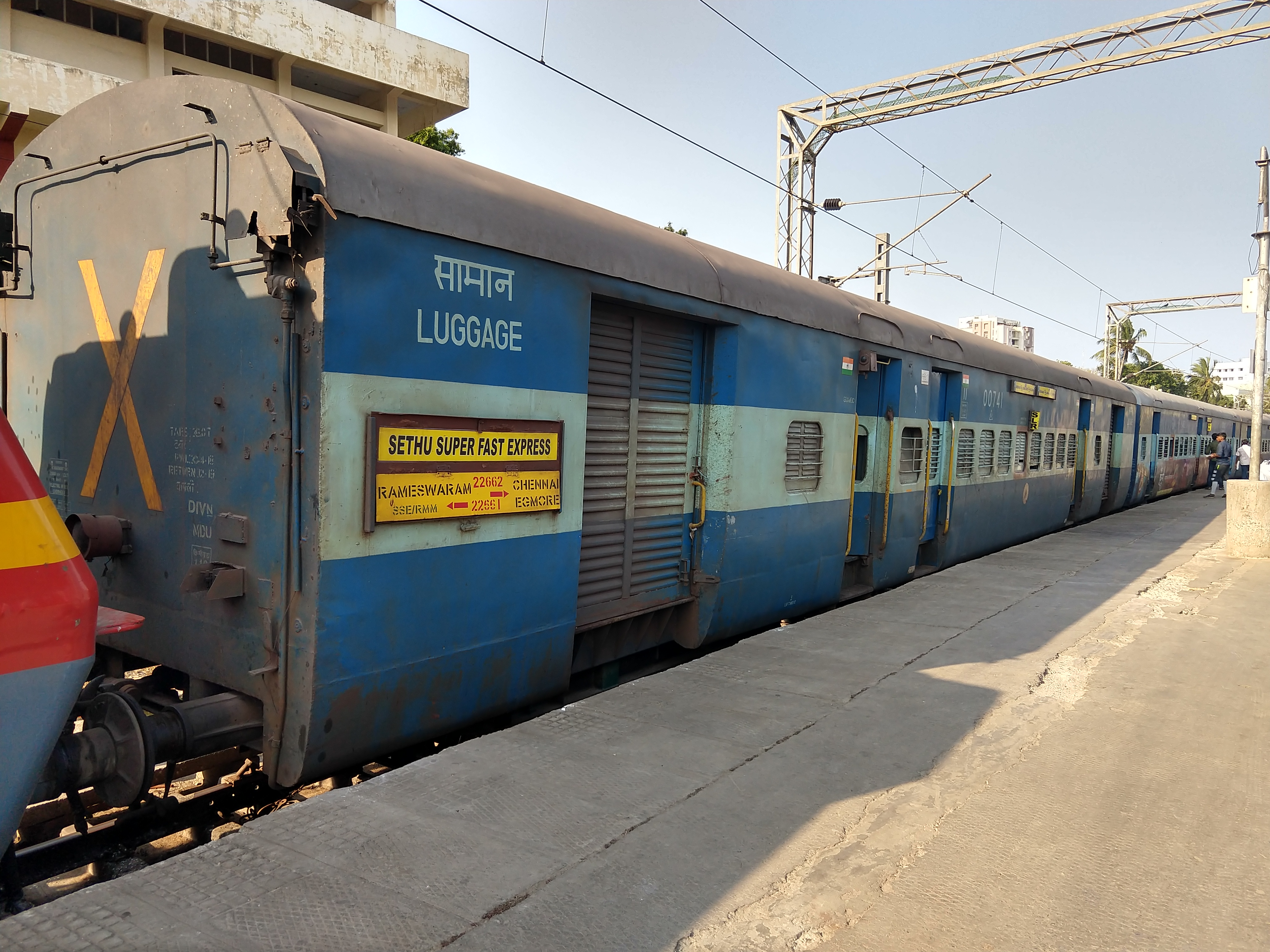
Sethu Express halted in Chennai Egmore

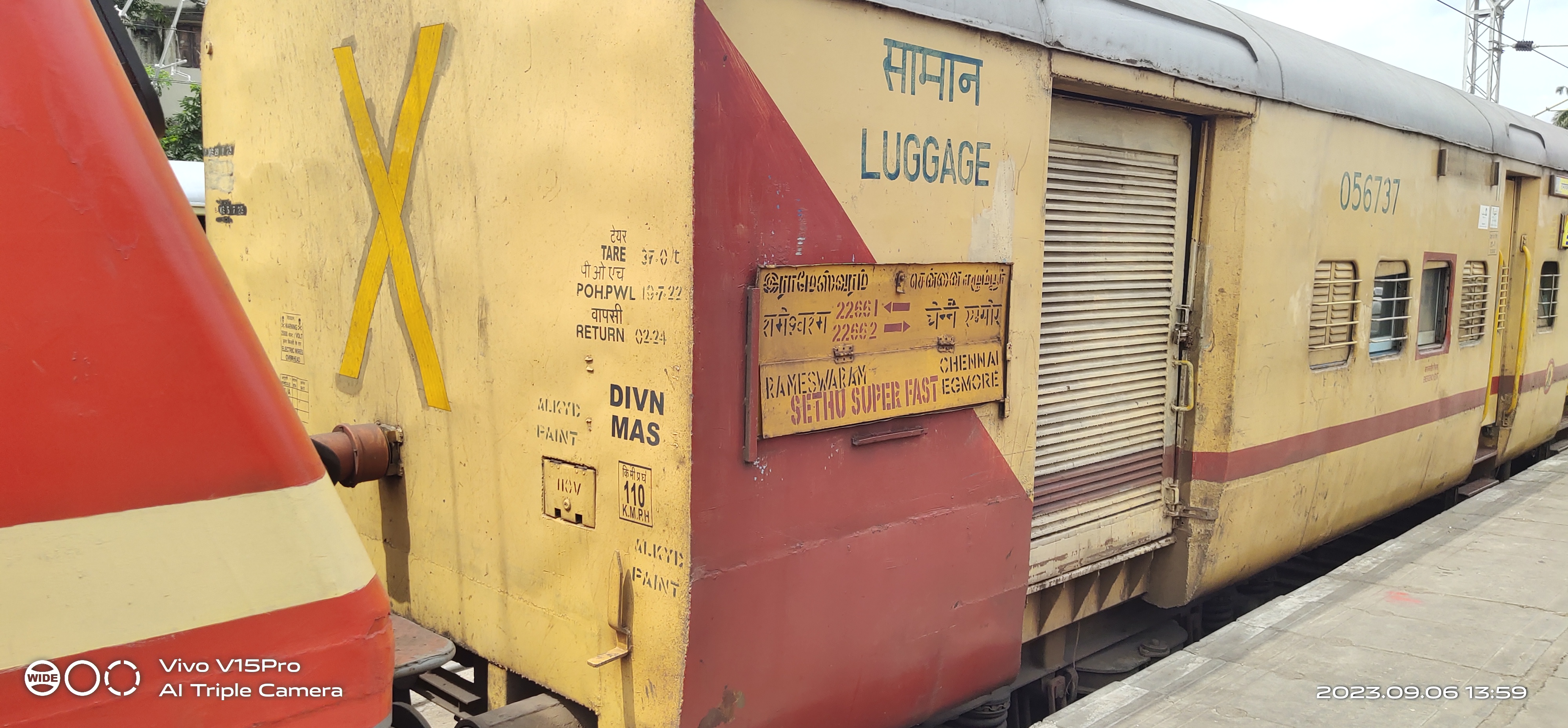

== Traction ==
it was hauled by WAP-4 or Tondiarpet-based WDM-3A and so was Golden Rock-based WDG-3A

== Coach composition ==
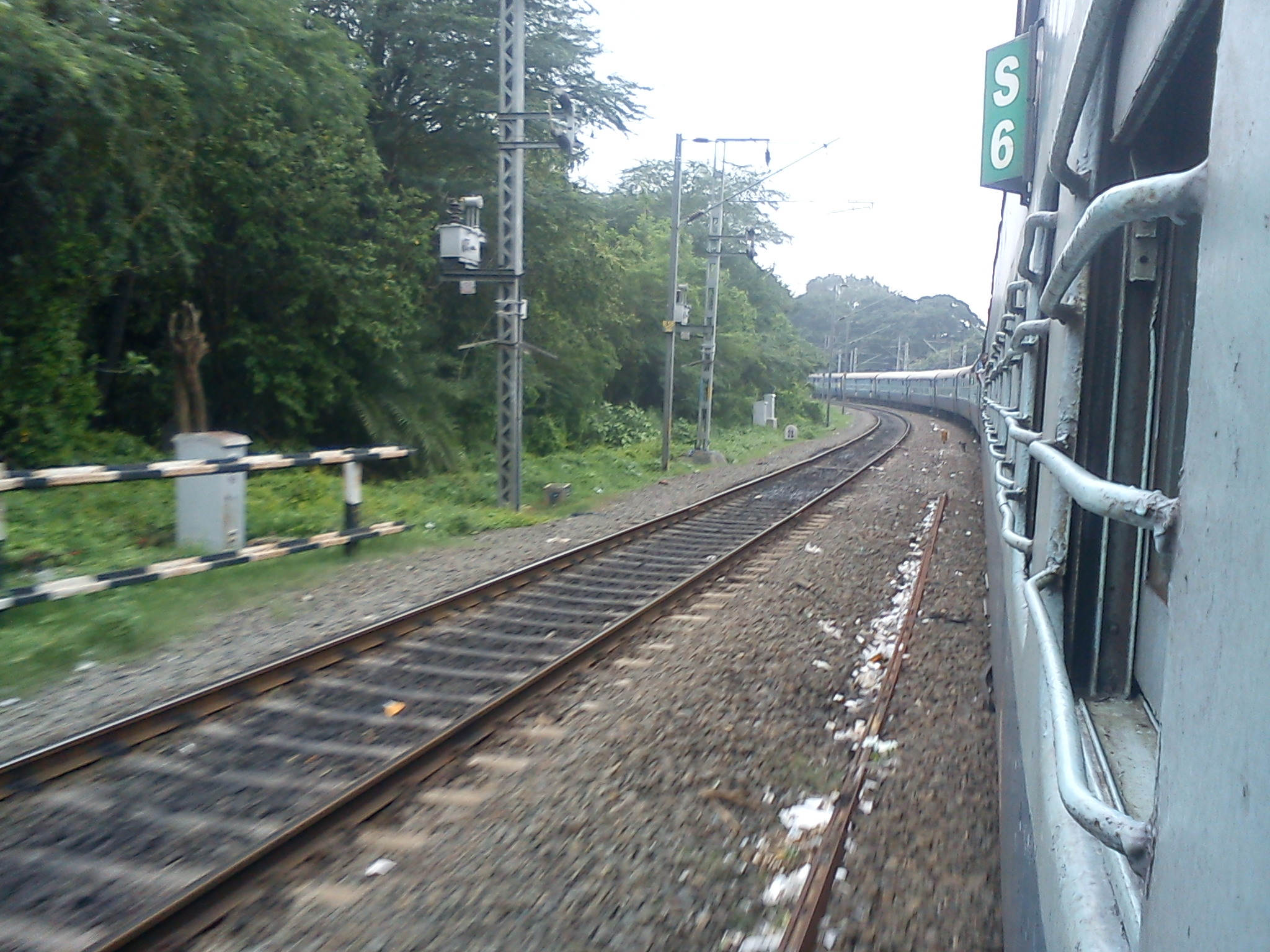
Sethu Express passing near Chengalpattu Jn

Total number of coaches: 23

| Loco | 1 | 2 | 3 | 4 | 5 | 6 | 7 | 8 | 9 | 10 | 11 | 12 | 13 | 14 | 15 | 16 | 17 | 18 | 19 | 20 | 21 | 22 | 23 |
|---|---|---|---|---|---|---|---|---|---|---|---|---|---|---|---|---|---|---|---|---|---|---|---|
| | SLR | GS | GS | S1 | S2 | S3 | S4 | S5 | S6 | S7 | S8 | S9 | S10 | S11 | S12 | B3 | B2 | B1 | A1 | HA1 | GS | GS | SLR |

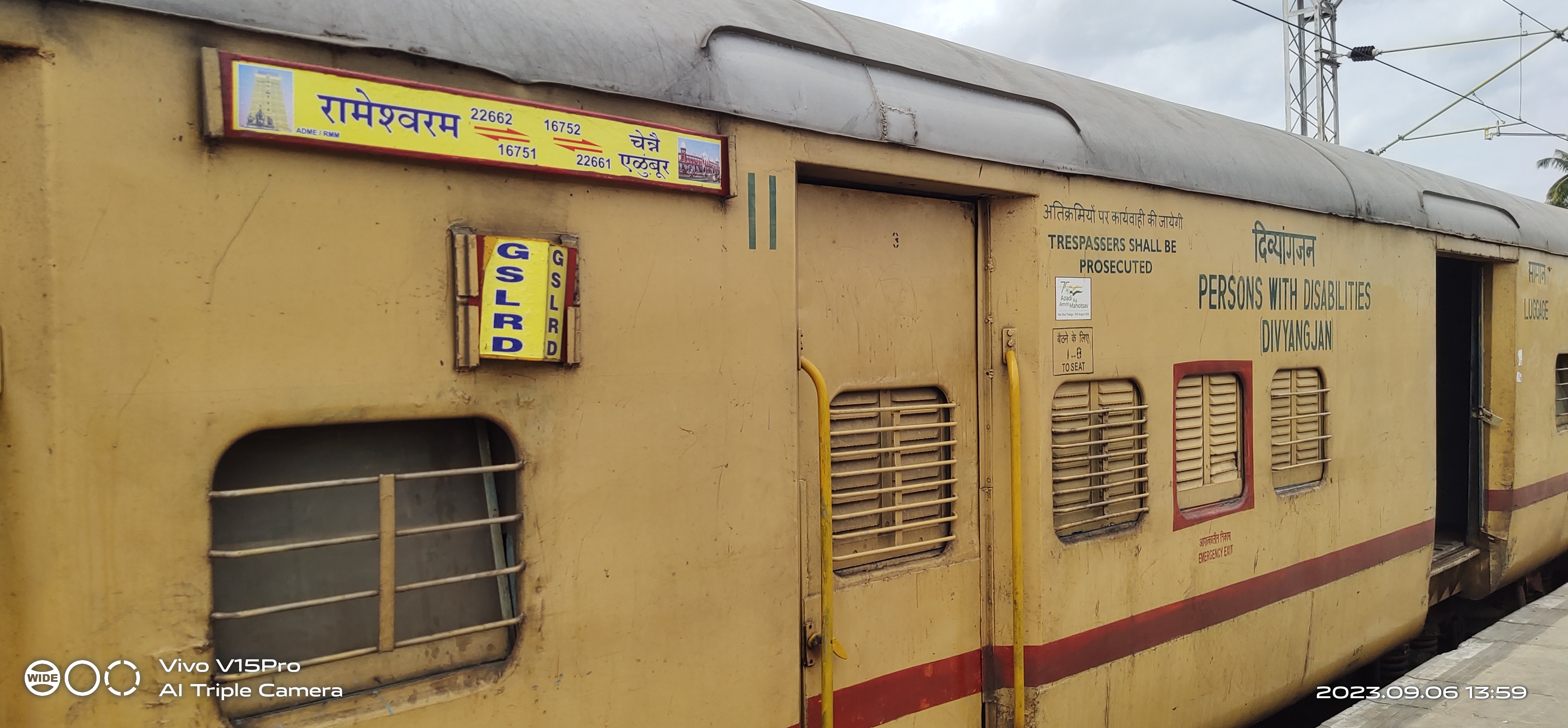

== See also ==
- Cholan Superfast Express
- Pallavan Superfast Express
- Pandian Superfast Express
- Vaigai Superfast Express
- Boatmail Express
- Rockfort Superfast Express
- Silambu Express
- Ananthapuri Express
- Pothigai Superfast Express
- Pearl City (Muthunagar) Superfast Express
- Chennai Egmore-Puducherry Express
