= Uzhavan Express =

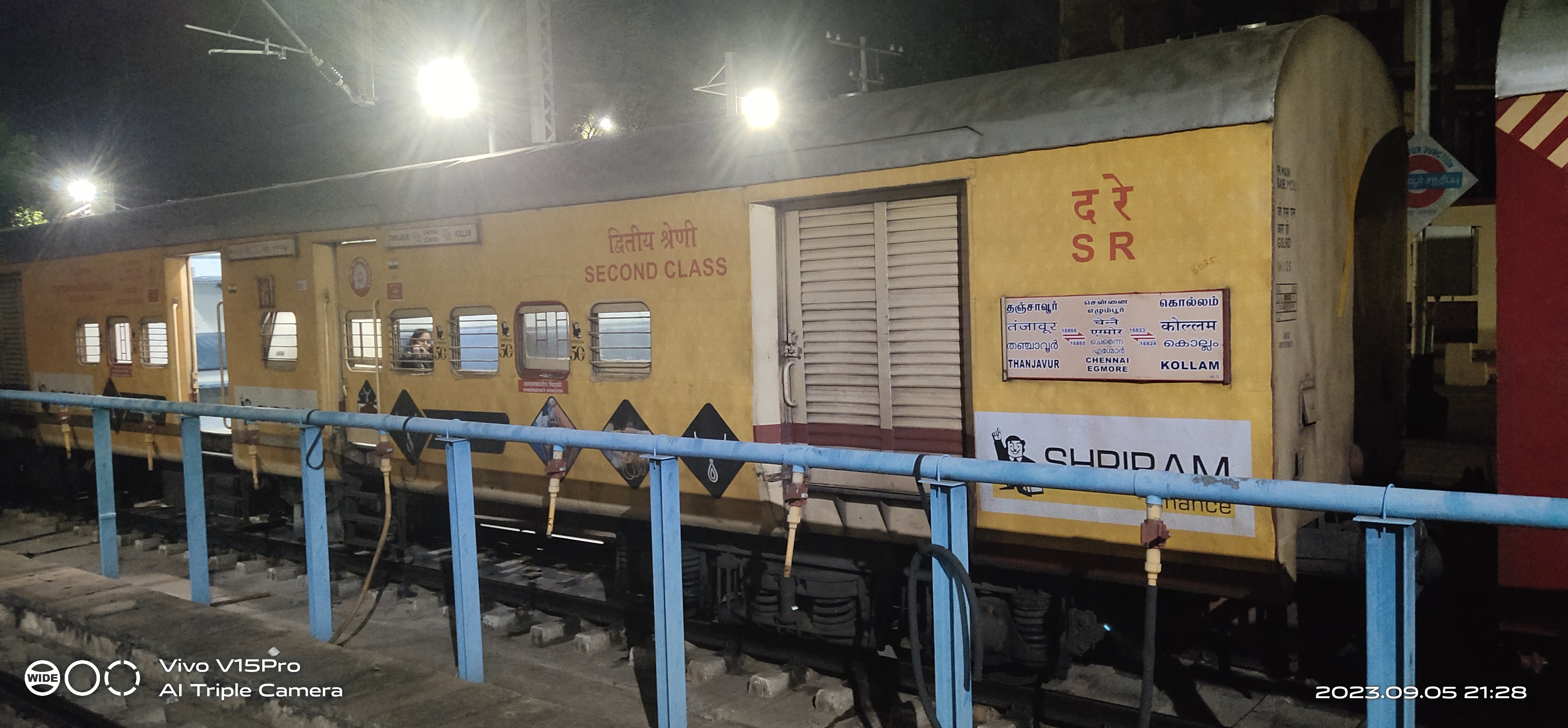
- Thanjavur - Chennai Egmore Uzhavan Express At Thanjavur Junction

Overview
- Service type: Mail/Express
- Status: Active
- Locale: Tamil Nadu
- First service: Sun Sep 01,2013
- Current operator: Indian Railways
- Former operator: Southern Railway
- Ridership: Mail/Express
- Annual ridership: Mail/Express
- Website: www.indianrailways.gov.in

Route
- Termini: Chennai Egmore (MS); Thanjavur Junction (TJ)
- Stops: 12
- Distance travelled: 351 km (218 mi)
- Average journey time: 07 Hr 05min
- Service frequency: Daily
- Train number: 16865 / 16866

On-board services
- Classes: 1 A/C 1st Class (H) Coach; 2 2nd A/C II Tire (A) Coaches; 3 3rd A/C III Tire (B) Coaches; 12 Sleeper Class (SL) Coaches; 3 Unreserved Coaches; 2 GSLRD Coaches
- Disabled access: Disabled access
- Seating arrangements: Yes
- Sleeping arrangements: Yes
- Catering facilities: No
- Observation facilities: Large windows
- Baggage facilities: Overhead racks

Technical
- Rolling stock: WAP-4 from Arakkonam, Erode Electric Shed
- Track gauge: 1,676 mm (5 ft 6 in)
- Electrification: 25 kV AC 50 Hz Overhead Electric Traction
- Operating speed: 54 km/h (34 mph) average with halts 110kmph
- Average length: 23 Coaches
- Track owner: Indian Railways
- Timetable number: 21/21A
- Rake maintenance: Tiruchchirappalli Junction coaching depot
- Rake sharing: Ananthapuri Express
Route map
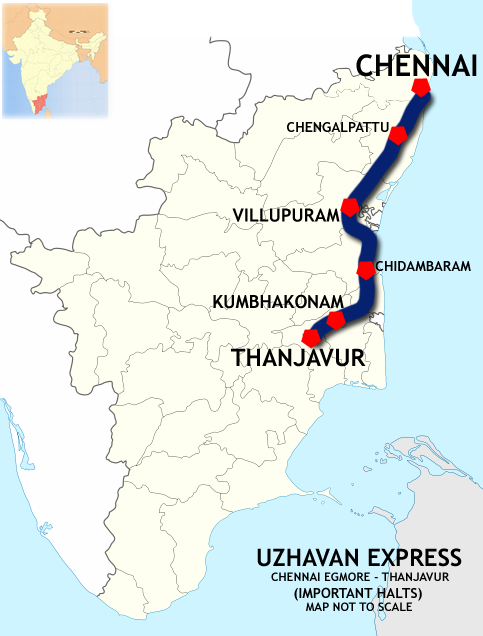

The Uzhavan Express is a train route of the Southern Railway zone of the Indian Railways and runs between Chennai Egmore and Thanjavur Junction. The express was introduced on 1 September 2013. It operates daily and covers a distance of 351 km.

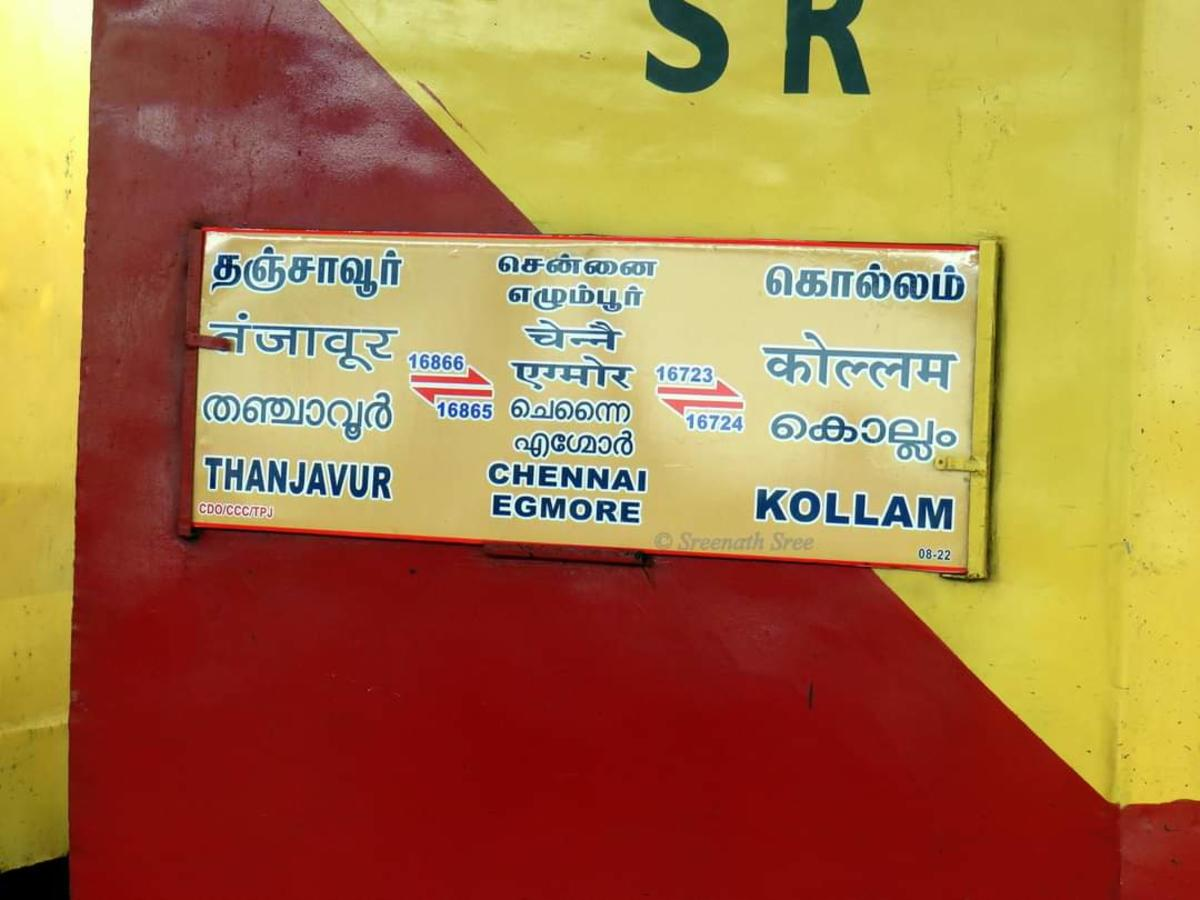
Uzhavan Express is at Thanjavur Junction

== Schedule ==
16865 ~ Chennai Egmore → Thanjavur Junction ~ Uzhavan Express
Station Name	Station Code	Arrival	Departure	Day
Chennai Egmore	MS	SOURCE	22:15	1
Mambalam	MBM	22:26	22:27	1
Tambaram	TBM	22:48	22:50	1
Chengalpattu Junction	CGL	23:18	23:20	1
Villupuram Junction	VM	00:35	00:40	2
Cuddalore Port Junction	CUPJ	01:21	01:22	2
Chidambaram	CDM	02:43	02:45	2
Sirkazhi	SY	03:00	03:01	2
Mayiladuthurai Junction	MV	03:25	03:27	2
Kutaalam	KTM	03:39	03:40	2
Aduthurai	ADT	03:51	03:52	2
Kumbakonam	KMU	04:03	04:05	2
Papanasam	PML	04:17	04:18	2
Thanjavur Junction	TJ	05:10	DEST	2
16866 ~ Thanjavur Junction → Chennai Egmore ~ Uzhavan Express
Thanjavur Junction	TJ	SOURCE	21:50	1
Papanasam	PML	22:11	22:12	1
Kumbakonam	KMU	22:24	22:26	1
Aduthurai	ADT	22:37	22:38	1
Kutaalam	KTM	22:50	22:51	1
Mayiladuthurai Junction	MV	23:05	23:10	1
Vaitheeswaran Koil	VDL	23:25	23:26	1
Sirkazhi	SY	23:34	23:35	1
Chidambaram	CDM	23:50	23:52	1
Cuddalore Port Junction	CUPJ	00:21	00:22	2
Villupuram Junction	VM	01:35	01:40	2
Chengalpattu Junction	CGL	02:58	03:00	2
Tambaram	TBM	03:28	03:30	2
Mambalam	MBM	03:48	03:50	2
Chennai Egmore	MS	04:25	DEST	2

== Rolling stock ==
Uzhavan Express runs end to end with WAP-4 Loco From Arakkonam, Erode Electric Shed, WAP-7 from Royapuram Electric Loco Shed.

== Coach composition ==
the train consists of 23 LHB coaches

- 1 AC I Tier
- 2 AC II Tier
- 3 AC III Tiers
- 12 Sleeper Coaches
- 3 General
- 2 Second-class Luggage/parcel van

Loco	1	2	3	4	5	6	7	8	9	10	11	12	13	14	15	16	17	18	19	20	21	22	23
	SLR	GS	GS	S12	S11	S10	S9	S8	S7	S6	S5	S4	S3	S2	S1	B3	B2	B1	A2	A1	H1	GS	SLR

The Uzhavan Express between Chennai Egmore and Thanjavur has a rake sharing agreement (RSA) with Ananthapuri Express between Chennai and Kollam. The primary maintenance of four rakes of the express trains is being carried out at the Trichy coaching depot. This train is very very likely to receive lhb coaches by first quarter of 2026. The coach composition will be 10 sleeper coaches 4 3 ac coaches 3 2ac coaches 1 1 ac coach and 3 Unreserved coaches and 1 car generator(22 coaches).

== See also ==
- Pothigai Superfast Express
- Kanniyakumari Superfast Express
- Pearl City (Muthunagar) Superfast Express
- Ananthapuri Express
- Chemmozhi Express
- Tea Garden Express
- Pandian Superfast Express
- Vaigai Superfast Express
- Chendur Superfast Express
- Pallavan Superfast Express
- Mayiladuthurai-Coimbatore Jan Shatabdi Express
- Chennai Egmore-Puducherry Express
- Sethu Superfast Express
- Boat Mail Express
- Guruvayur Express
