= Silambu Express =

Silambu Superfast Express
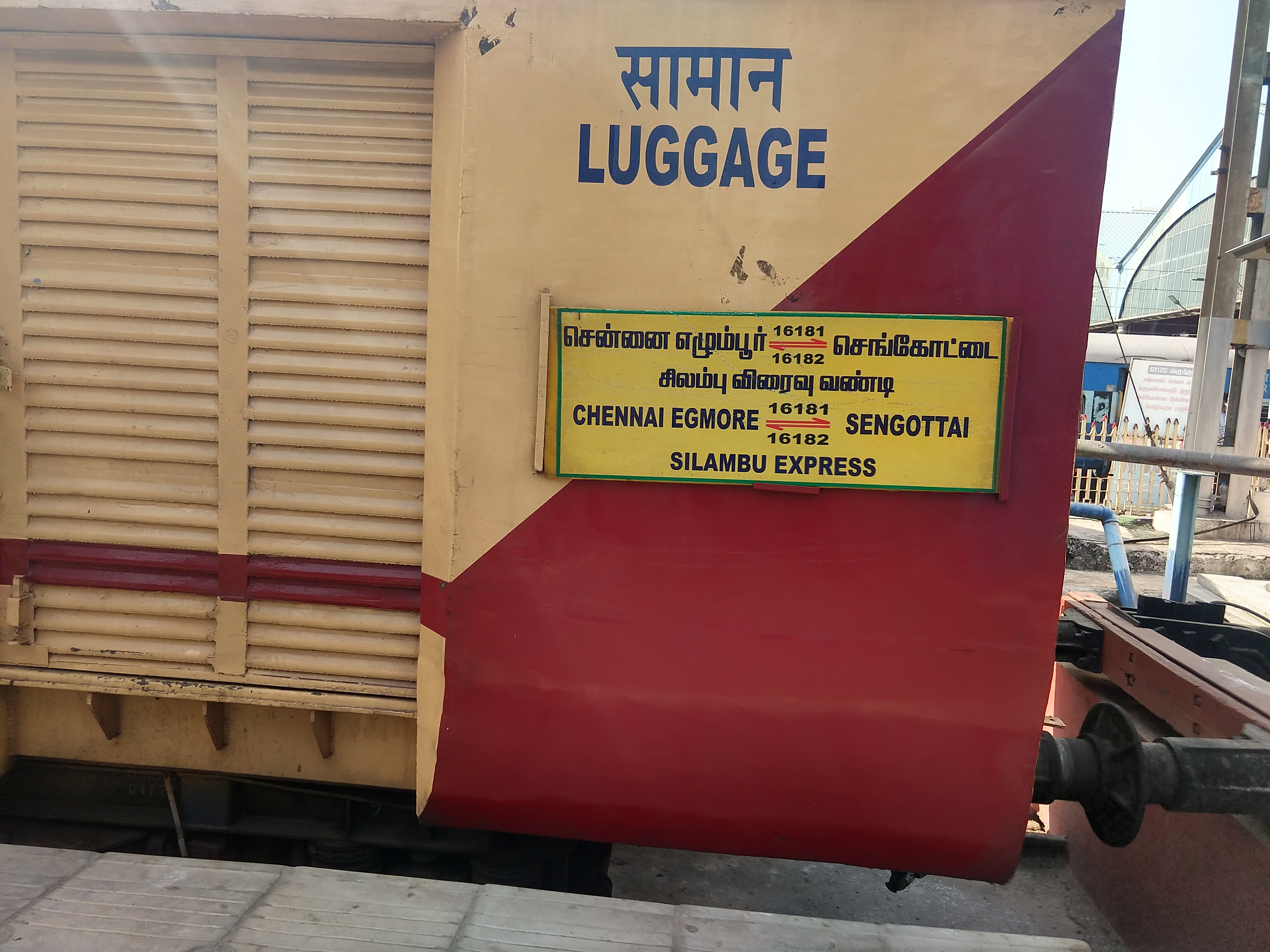
- Silambu Express at Chennai Egmore.

Overview
- Service type: Super Fast train
- Locale: Tamil Nadu
- First service: 22 June 2013
- Current operator: Southern Railways

Route
- Termini: Chennai Egmore; Sengottai
- Stops: 21
- Distance travelled: 683 km (424 mi)
- Average journey time: 12 hours 20 mins
- Service frequency: Tri-weekly
- Train number: 20681 / 20682

On-board services
- Classes: AC First, AC Two Tier, AC Three Tier, Sleeper class, General Unreserved
- Seating arrangements: No
- Sleeping arrangements: Yes
- Observation facilities: Large windows
- Entertainment facilities: No

Technical
- Track gauge: 1,676 mm (5 ft 6 in)
- Electrification: Partially electrified (till Virudhunagar Junction)
- Operating speed: 52.5 km/h (32.6 mph) average with halts
- Timetable number: 8 / 8A
- Rake maintenance: Tambaram Railway Yard
- Rake sharing: Tambaram Nagercoil Triweekly Express
Route map
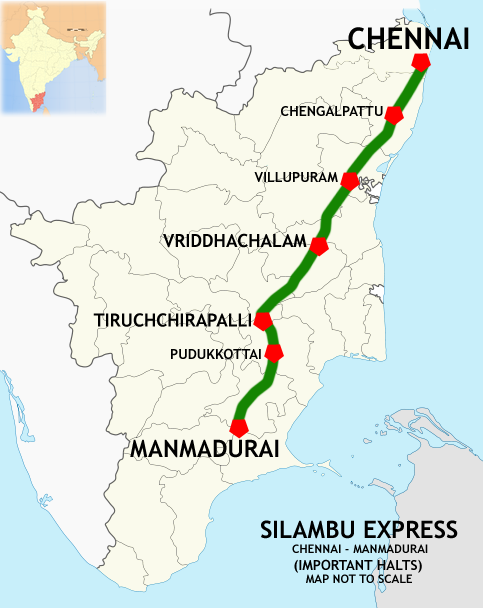
- Silambu Express Route map

The Silambu Super fast Express (20681/20682) is a train that runs between Chennai Egmore and Sengottai via Karaikkudi Junction. Initially it ran up to Manamadurai, later it was extended up to Sengottai. It was the only train in Indian Railways where LHB rakes were replaced by ICF coaches again. According to IR if a train gets new LHB coaches it won't be converted to ICF. But this train was again replaced with ICF coaches after getting new LHB rakes.

== History ==
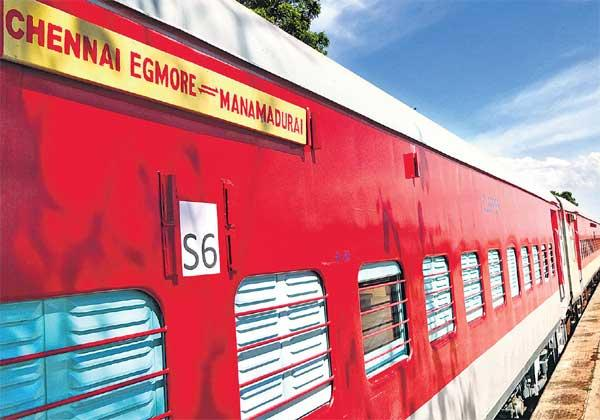
Chennai Egmore - Manamadurai Jn. Silambu Express LHB coaches halted at Manamadurai Junction

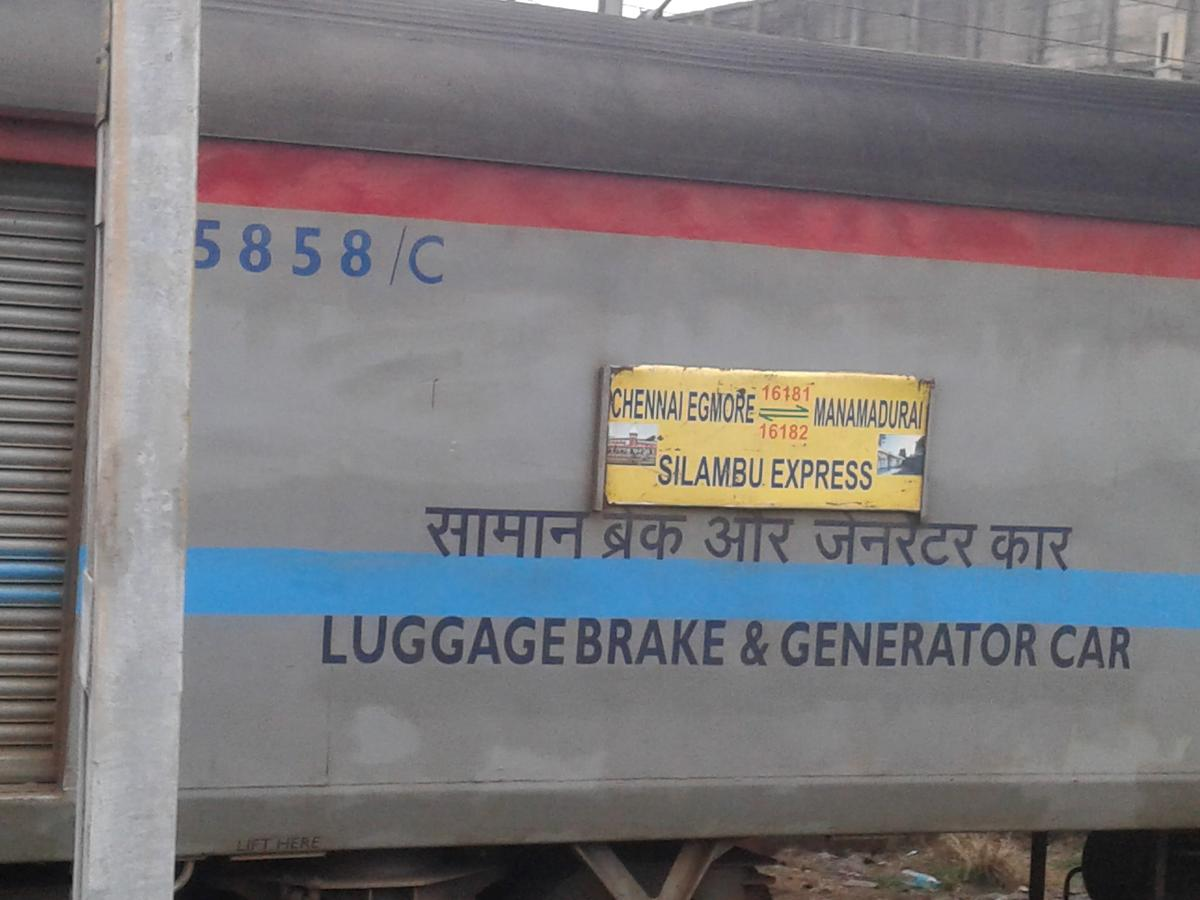
2nd set of brand new LHB coaches was received by Southern Railway for 16181/16182 Silambu Express

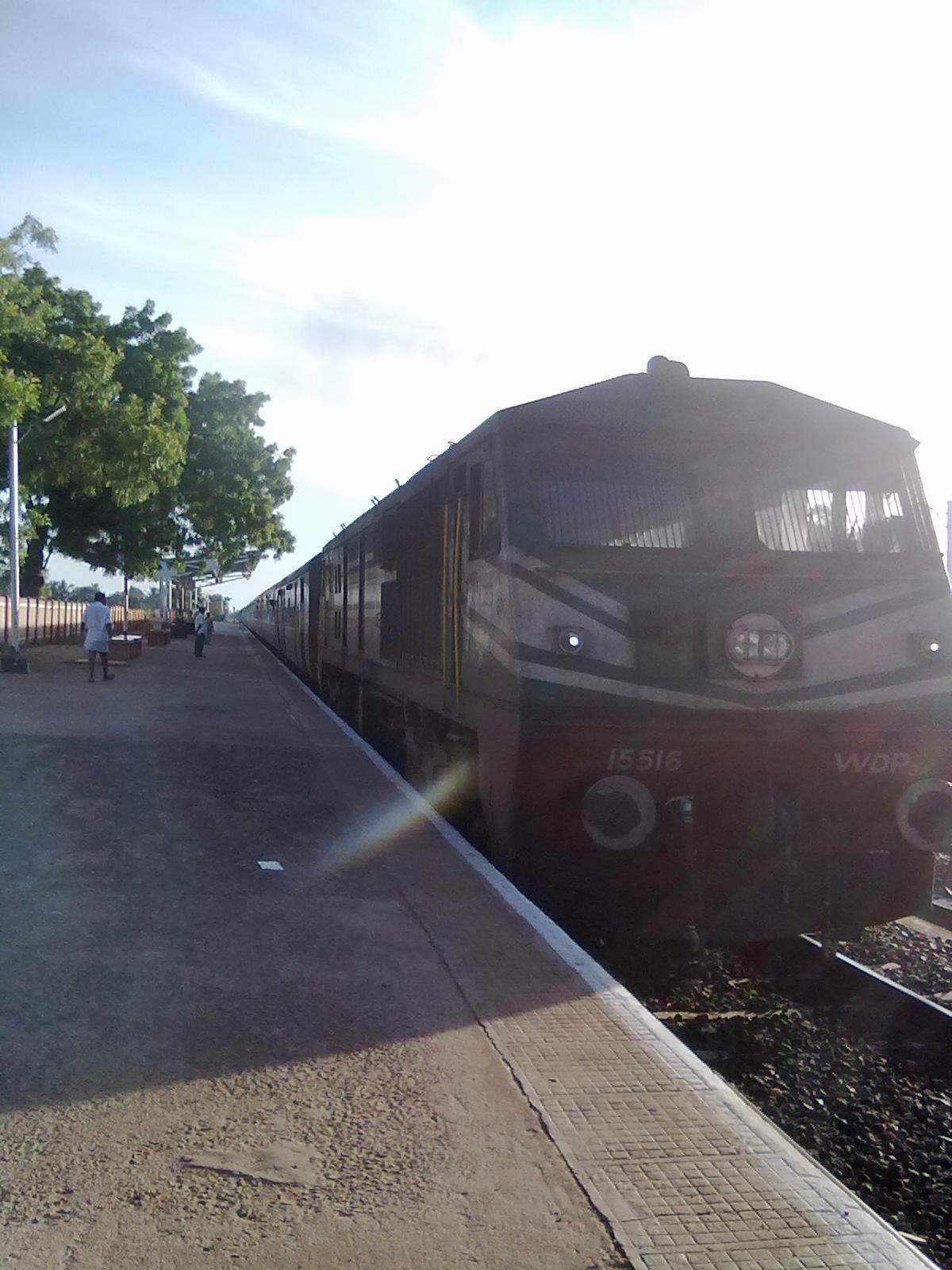
Chennai Egmore - Manamadurai Jn. Silambu Express halted at Manamadurai Junction

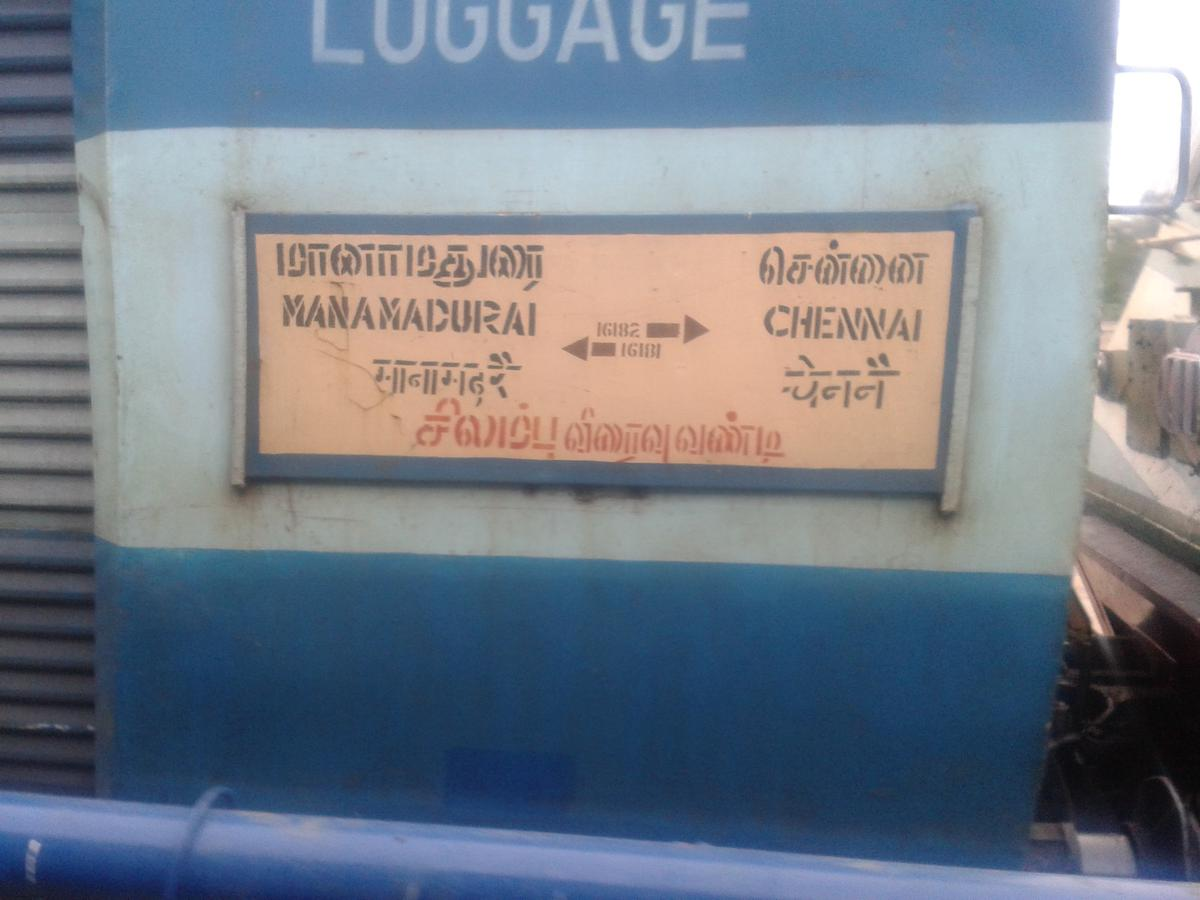
Manamadurai Chennai Silambu Express 2nd platform of Manamadurai Jn.

The name of the train commemorates Kannagi, a legendary Tamil woman who is the protagonist of the South Indian epic Cilappatikaram (100–300 CE) who used her silambu (anklet) to prove her husband Kovalan's innocence, who was executed by the Pandya king.It is a standard train consisting of commercial coaches. The train operates tri-weekly in each direction and covers a distance of 683 km. Initially, the train was announced between Chennai Egmore and Karaikudi Junction but due to public demand it started its Maiden Run until Manamadurai via Sivagangai Instead of Terminating at Karaikudi Junction. From 04/03/2017 onwards this train was further extended to Sengottai via Aruppukkottai, Virudhunagar Junction, Sivakasi, Tenkasi Junction. The Silambu Express was announced in the Railway Budget 2013 and the service started on 22 June 2013, extended to Sengottai from 5 Mar 2017. From 25 Feb 2019, the frequency of the service was increased from bi-weekly to tri-weekly. From April 15, 2022, Chennai Egmore – Sengottai Silambu Express was converted to Superfast category with new number 20681 MS SCT Silambu Superfast Express and Sengottai - Chennai Egmore Silambu express with new number 20682.

== Coach composition ==
At present, the train has 22 standard ICF utskrit coaches.

- 1 AC First Class Cum AC Two Tier
- 2 AC Two Tier
- 4 AC Three Tier
- 11 Sleeper Class
- 4 General Unreserved
- 2 Luggage Cum Disabled Coaches.

Till November 2021, it has different coach composition.

- 1 AC First Class
- 1 AC Two Tier
- 2 Three Tier
- 8 Sleeper Class
- 6 General Unreserved
- 2 Luggage Cum Disabled Coach.

When it ran as with LHB coaches only for three trips in 2016, it had different coach composition.

- 1 AC First Class
- 1 AC Two Tier
- 3 AC Three Tier
- 9 Sleeper Class
- 7 General Unreserved
- 2 End On Generator Cars.

But due to replacement of ICF Coaches again it was replaced with new coach composition.

Till October 2017 from its introduction it ran with the following composition,

- 1 AC Two Tier
- 2 AC Three Tier
- 8 Sleeper Class
- 6 General Unreserved
- 2 Luggage Cum Disabled Coach

== See also ==
- Boat Mail
- Pothigai Superfast Express
- Rockfort Superfast Express
- Mannai Express
- Pallavan Superfast Express
- Sethu Express
- Cholan Express
- Uzhavan Express
- Vaigai Superfast Express
