= Cholan Express =

Train in India

Overview
- Service type: Superfast
- Status: Active
- Locale: Tamil Nadu
- First service: Mon Apr 26, 2010
- Current operator: Indian Railways
- Former operator: Indian Railways

Route
- Termini: Tiruchchirappalli Junction (TPJ); Chennai Egmore (MS)
- Stops: 19
- Distance travelled: 401 km (249 mi)
- Average journey time: 07 hours 15 minutes
- Service frequency: Daily
- Train number: 22675 / 22676
- Line used: Main line

On-board services
- Classes: 1AC, 2AC, 3AC, SL, GS & EOG
- Disabled access: Disabled access
- Seating arrangements: Yes
- Sleeping arrangements: Yes
- Auto-rack arrangements: No
- Catering facilities: No
- Observation facilities: Large Windows
- Entertainment facilities: No
- Baggage facilities: Overhead racks

Technical
- Rolling stock: Locomotive: WAP 4 (AJJ); Bogie: LHB coach
- Track gauge: 1,676 mm (5 ft 6 in)
- Electrification: 25 kV AC, 50 Hz
- Operating speed: 64 kilometres per hour (40 mph)
- Track owner: Indian Railways
- Timetable number: 21/21A
- Rake maintenance: Madurai Depot
- Rake sharing: Pandian Express; Rockfort Express
Route map
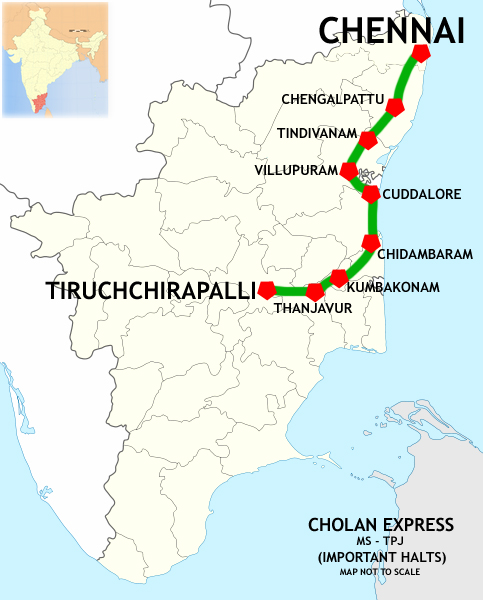
- Cholan Express (MS – TPJ) route map

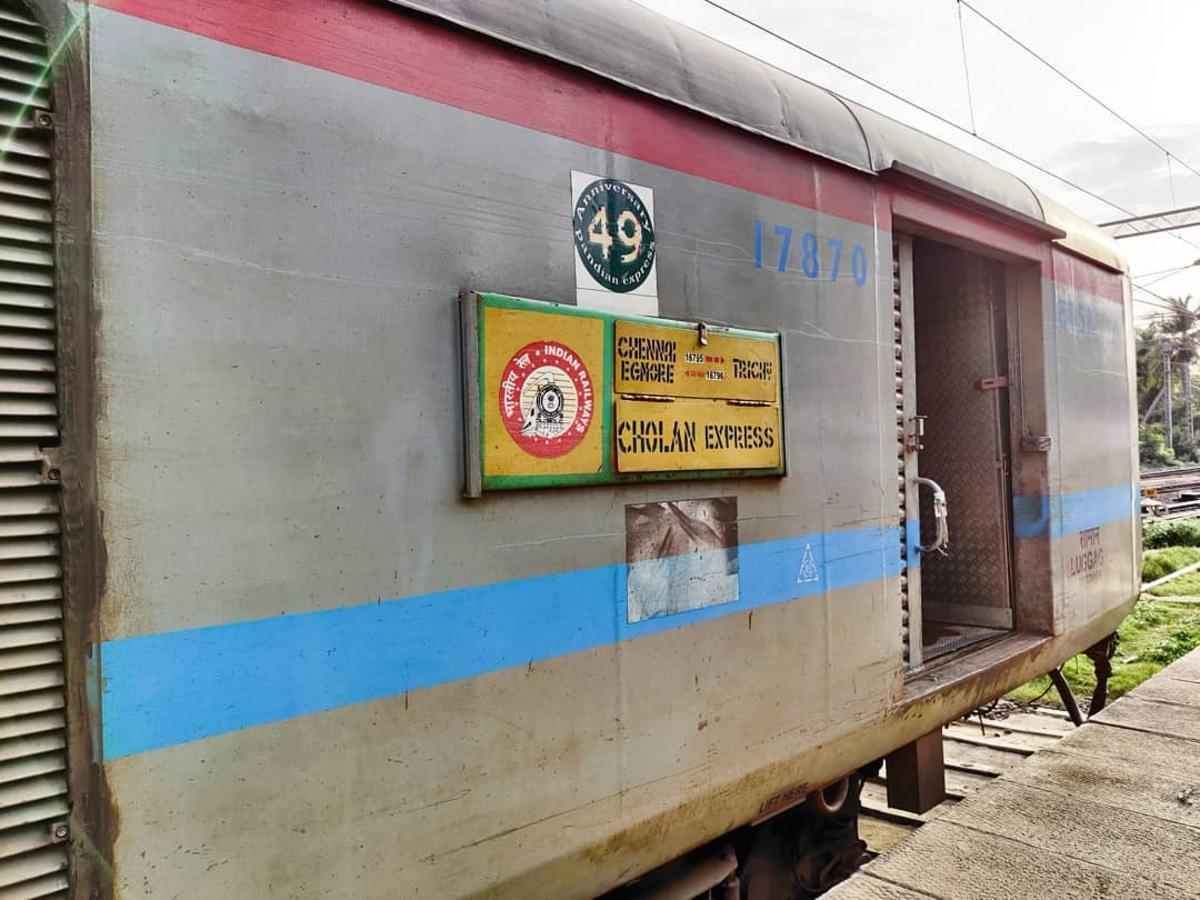
Cholan express

The Cholan Express is a superfast express train operated by the Southern Railway zone of the Indian Railways. This train connects Chennai Egmore and Tiruchchirappalli via Viluppuram, Cuddlore, Chidambaram, Kumbakonam and Thanjavur in the Indian state of Tamil Nadu. Total distance covered 401 km and travel time 7 hours 15 minutes to complete an entire journey. It is one of the fastest train services of southern railways, and often considered as the Pride of SR.

New LHB coach has been installed for this train since 16 February 2017.

== Relevance ==
Train is named after the Chola Kingdom which ruled over the regions through which the train passes. The Cholas ruled over their kingdom from their capital in Thanjavur, Poombuhar.

Coach composition

| Loco | 1 | 2 | 3 | 4 | 5 | 6 | 7 | 8 | 9 | 10 | 11 | 12 | 13 | 14 | 15 | 16 | 17 | 18 | 19 | 20 | 21 | 22 |
|---|---|---|---|---|---|---|---|---|---|---|---|---|---|---|---|---|---|---|---|---|---|---|
| | EOG | GS | GS | GS | S7 | S6 | S5 | S4 | S3 | S2 | S1 | B6 | B5 | B4 | B3 | B2 | B1 | A3 | A2 | A1 | H1 | EOG |

== Traction ==
It was used to haul WDG-3A from end to end. now main line is electrified, he used WAP-7 from an entire journey

== See also ==
- Pallavan Superfast Express
- Rockfort (Malaikottai) Superfast Express
- Uzhavan Express
- Chennai Egmore–Karaikal Kamban Express
- Mayiladuthurai–Mysore Express
- Pearl City (Muthunagar) Superfast Express
- Kanniyakumari Superfast Express
- Vaigai Superfast Express
- Pandian Superfast Express
- Sethu Express
- Anantapuri Express
- Mannai Express
