= Aruppukkottai railway station =

Railway station in Tamil Nadu, India

Aruppukkottai
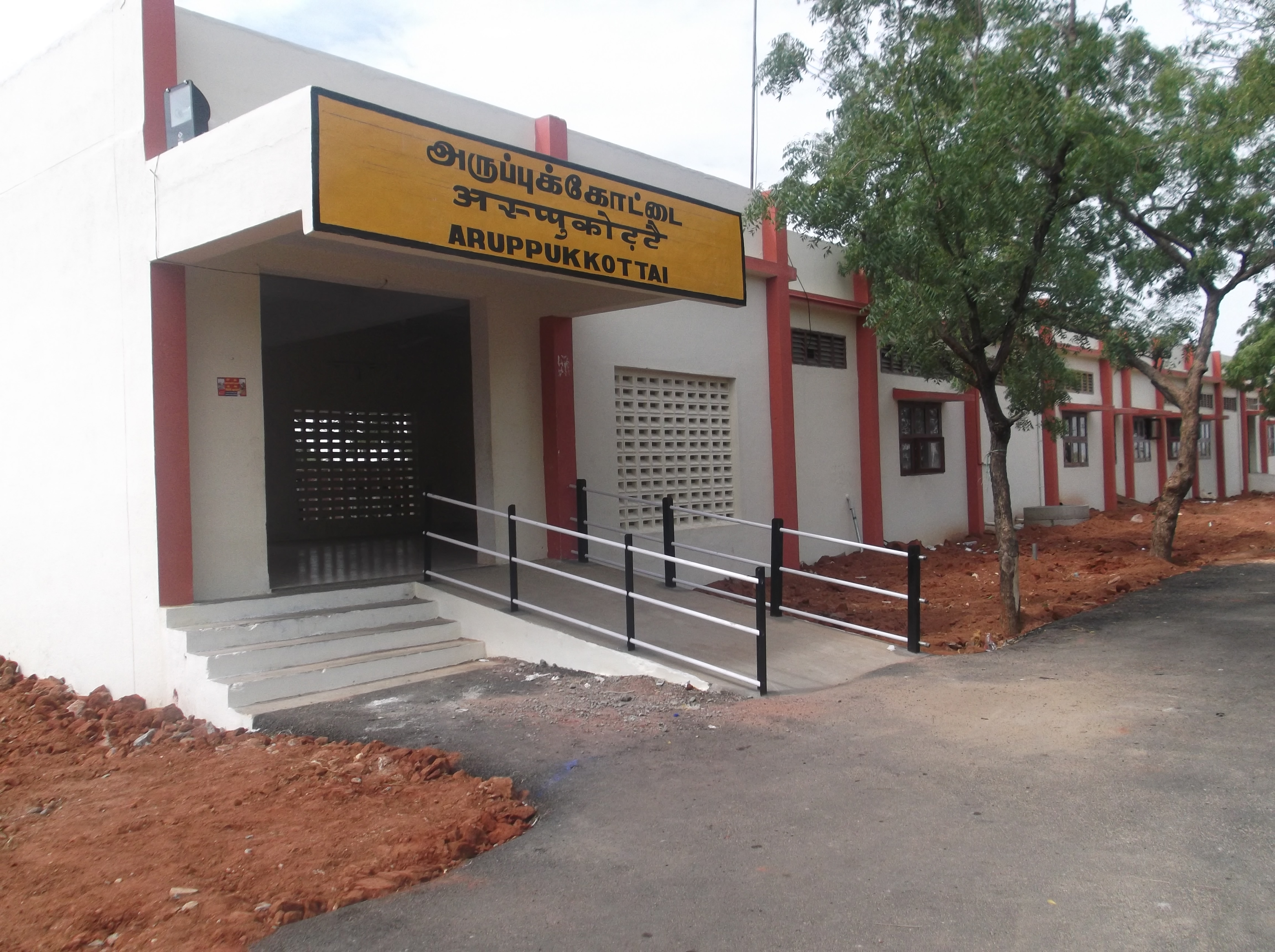
- The Main Entrance of the Station

General information
- Location: Railway feeder Road, Aruppukkottai, Tamil Nadu; India
- Coordinates: 9.5247°N 78.1029°E
- Elevation: 103 metres (338 ft)
- System: Express train, commuter rail and Passenger train station
- Owner: Indian Railway
- Operator: Southern Railway zone
- Lines: Manamadurai–Virudhunagar line Madurai–Thoothkudi (under Construction)
- Platforms: 3
- Tracks: 3
- Connections: Auto Rickshaw stand

Construction
- Structure type: Standard (on-ground station)
- Parking: Yes
- Accessible: Disabled access

Other information
- Status: Functioning
- Station code: APK
- Zone(s): Southern Railway zone
- Division(s): Madurai
- Fare zone: Southern Railway zone

History
- Opened: 1963; 63 years ago
- Rebuilt: 2013; 13 years ago
Route map
Location
- Location within Tamil Nadu

Aruppukkottai railway station (station code:APK) is an NSG–5 category Indian railway station in Madurai railway division of Southern Railway zone. It is located in Aruppukkottai, Tamil Nadu connecting Manamadurai and Virudhunagar. A new railway line from Manamadurai Junction–Virudhunagar Junction Via Aruppukkottai was proposed in the Third Five Year plan, which was supposed to ease the pressure on the existing Manamadurai Junction–Madurai Junction and Madurai Junction–Virudhunagar Junction sections.

On 1 September 1963, the 22.66 kilometres (14.08 mi) Virudhunagar Junction – Aruppukkottai section was opened, along with Aruppukkottai railway station in the same year by the then Chief Minister of Tamil Nadu, K. Kamaraj. And on 2 May 1964, the rest of 43.89 kilometres (27.27 mi) Aruppukkottai – Manamadurai Junction section was thrown to traffic. Opened with meter gauge tracks, the 67 kilometres (42 mi) This station catering immensely passengers of the region and unloading food grains for TNCSC.

== Overview ==
It is the main route to connecting south districts to delta districts, and it is the route Virudhunagar–Aruppukottai-Manamadurai–Karaikudi–Trichy/Mayiladuthurai alternate route for Virudhunagar–Madurai–Dindigul-Trichy to Chennai. Further more now Indian Railways starting a new railway line between Madurai to Thoothukudi New railway line through Madurai–Thiruparankundram–Kariapatti–Aruppukottai–Vilathikulam–Thoothukudi this line make Aruppukottai railway station as railway junction.

== Location and layout ==
The railway station is located about 1.3 kilometres from the new bus stand. It is not easily accessible as it is located far away from the main town. It can be accessed through a cab or an auto.

Before the gauge conversion, the station had 5 tracks including goodshed siding. but Now goodshed demolished and only three track has been constructed. third track for handling goods trains. As it is a passing station, there are no pit lines available. There is also a considerable amount of space available for the extension of the railway station in future.

== Current situation ==
Departures from Aruppukkottai

After reopening only 4 Express trains Runs on this station one is Puducherry Kanniyakumari weekly express which ran as the first express train in this station and this station was inaugurated with this train after conversion to Broad gauge. The second train is Silambu Express which is a Tri weekly super fast express train which runs from Chennai Egmore to Sengottai. Initially this train ran from Manamadurai. After a prolonged demands from people, this train has been extended till sengottai, third one also a Triweekly Tambaram-Sengottai Super fast express. and fourth one is Ernakulam-Velankanni Express a biweekly express connecting second largest city of kerala with Aruppukottai.Apart from these express trains there is a passenger train which was operated between Karaikudi and Manamadurai that runs six days of a week between has been extended as Karaikudi - Virudhunagar Passenger via Aruppukottai.

== See also ==
- List of railway stations in India
