= Ananthapuri Express =

Train in India

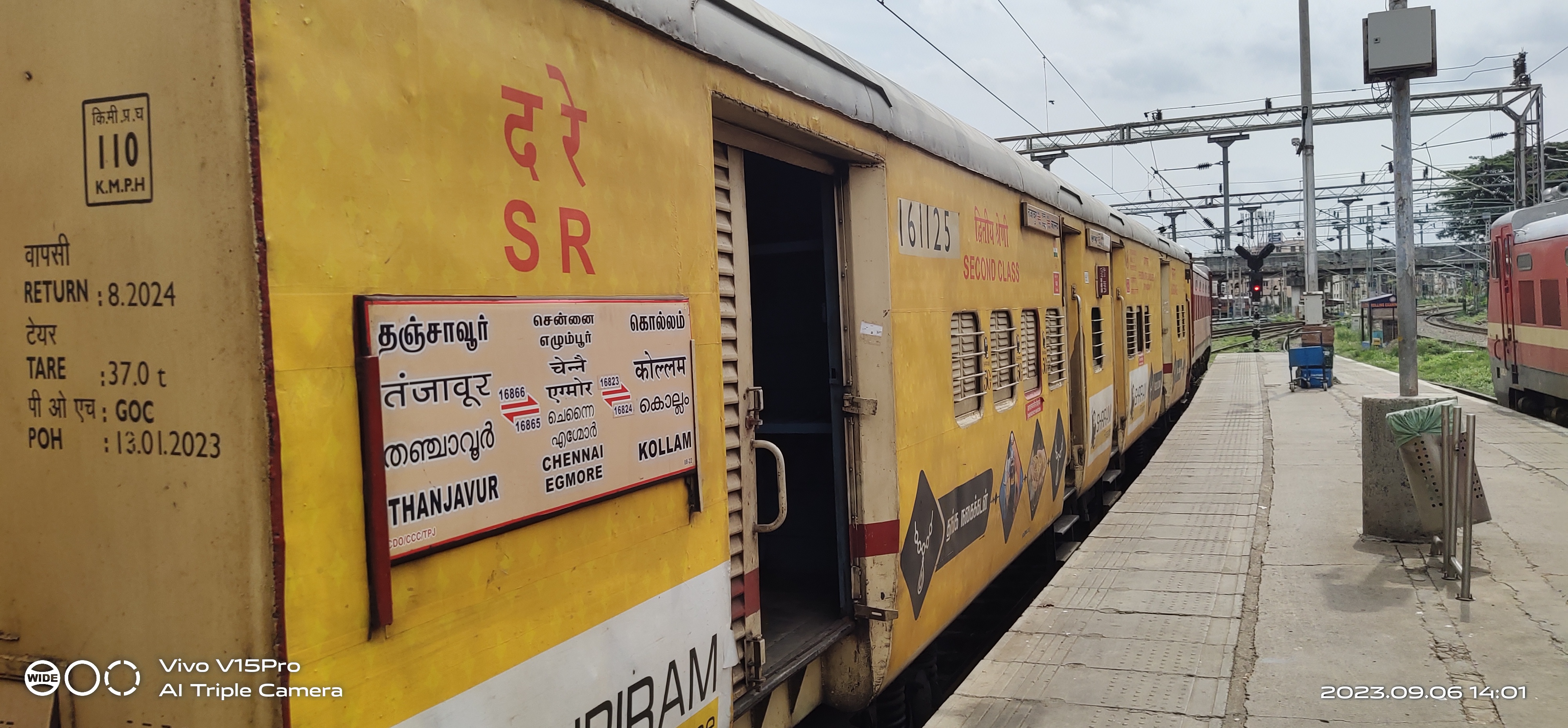

Overview
- Service type: Superfast
- Locale: Kerala & Tamil Nadu
- First service: 30 June 2002; 24 years ago
- Current operator: Southern Railway

Route
- Termini: Tambaram (TBM); Kollam Junction (QLN)
- Stops: 26 Halts
- Distance travelled: 858 km (533 mi)
- Average journey time: 15 hours 30 minutes
- Service frequency: Daily
- Train number: 20635 / 20636

On-board services
- Classes: AC first, AC 2 tier, AC 3 tier, Sleeper class, General Unreserved
- Disabled access: Disabled access
- Seating arrangements: Yes
- Sleeping arrangements: Yes
- Catering facilities: On-Board Catering, E-Catering
- Observation facilities: Large windows
- Baggage facilities: Available
- Other facilities: Below the seats

Technical
- Rolling stock: ICF coach (lhb by Q1 2026)
- Track gauge: 5 ft 6 in (1,676 mm) broad gauge
- Operating speed: 67 km/h (42 mph) average including halts.
- Rake maintenance: Tiruchchirappalli Junction CDO
- Rake sharing: 16965/16866 Uzhavan Express.
Route map
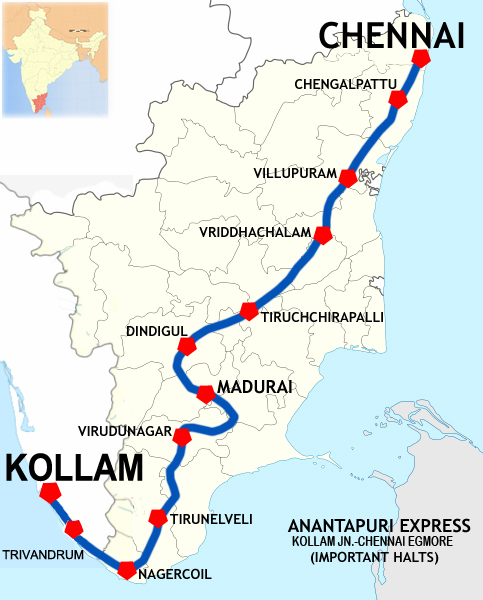

The 20635 / 20636 Ananthapuri Express is an express train running between Kollam Junction and Tambaram via Thiruvananthapuram Central, Tirunelveli Junction, Virudhunagar junction, Madurai Junction, Tiruchchirappalli Junction and Villupuram Junction through the trunk line and chord lines in southern India. It is a daily overnight Superfast Express service.

== History ==
The inauguration of this train was on 30 June 2002 operating six days a week. Later in 2005 it was made daily train. In the beginning it ran between Chennai Egmore and Thiruvananthapuram Central. It was named Ananthapuri after the city Thiruvananthapuram. In 2017 railway budget, it was extended to Kollam with effect from 1 November 2017.

== Coach composition ==
In total 23 coaches are there. It includes One AC First Class (H), Two AC 2 Tier (A), Three AC 3 Tier (B), Eleven Sleeper Class (SL), Four Unreserved general sitting coach (GS) and Two (SLRD).

Loco	1	2	3	4	5	6	7	8	9	10	11	12	13	14	15	16	17	18	19	20	21	22	23
	SLRD	GS	GS	S11	S10	S9	S8	S7	S6	S5	S4	S3	S2	S1	B3	B2	B1	A2	A1	H1	GS	GS	SLRD

The Ananthapuri Superfast Express between Chennai Egmore and Kollam has a rake sharing agreement (RSA) with Uzhavan Express (16865 / 16866) between Chennai and Thanjavur. The primary maintenanced by the four rakes of the express at Tiruchchirappalli (Trichy) coaching depot.

It is very very likely to get lhb coaches by first quarter of 2026. The coach composition will be 10 sleeper coaches, 4 3 ac coaches,3 2ac coaches 1 1 ac coach and 3 Unreserved coaches and 1 car generator(22 coaches).

== Incident ==
The engine of 16723 Express caught fire at Kollam Junction on 16 July 2018.

== See also ==
- Quilon Mail
- Ernakulam–Velankanni Express
- Guruvayur Express
- Palaruvi Express
- Silambu Express
- Pandian Superfast Express
- Vaigai Superfast Express
