= Auroville Express =

Indian express train

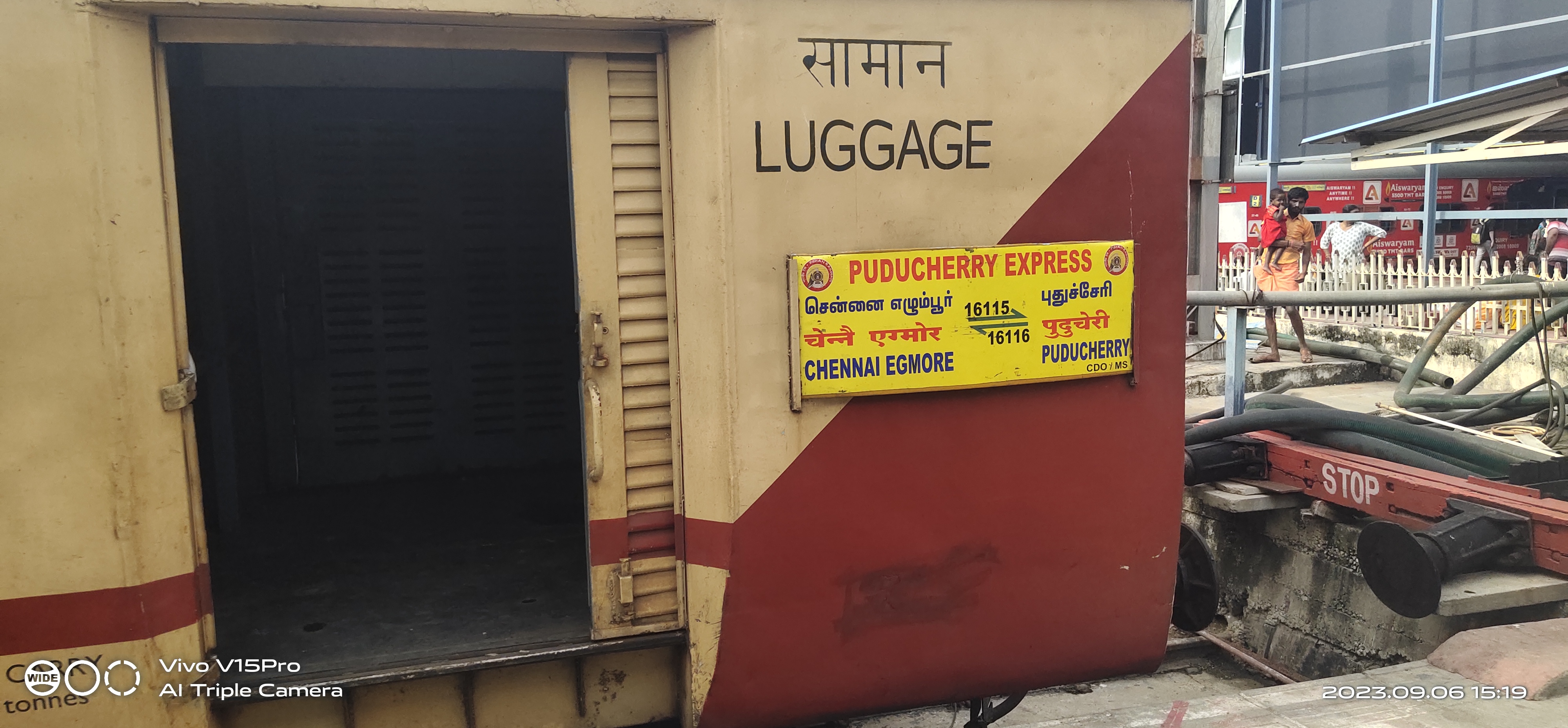
- Chennai Egmore - Pondicherry (Puducherry) Auroville Express at Chennai Egmore Railway Station

Overview
- Service type: Mail/Express
- Locale: Tamilnadu & Pondicherry
- Current operator: Southern Railway zone
- Former operator: Indian Railways
- Ridership: Mail/Express
- Annual ridership: Mail/Express
- Website: indianrailways.gov.in

Route
- Termini: Chennai Egmore (MS); Puducherry (PDY)
- Stops: 12
- Distance travelled: 197 km (122 mi)
- Average journey time: 4hrs 05min
- Service frequency: Daily
- Train numbers: 16115 (Down); 16116 (Up)

On-board services
- Classes: Non A/C Chair Car (D) 2; Unreserved (GS) 7; GSLRD 2
- Disabled access: Disabled access
- Seating arrangements: Yes
- Sleeping arrangements: No
- Catering facilities: On-board catering E-catering
- Observation facilities: Large Windows
- Entertainment facilities: No
- Baggage facilities: No
- Other facilities: No

Technical
- Rolling stock: WAP-4 Locomotive from Electric Loco Shed, Erode, Arakkonam; WAP-1 Locomotive from Electric Loco Shed, Erode
- Track gauge: 1,676 mm (5 ft 6 in)
- Electrification: 25kV AC 50 Hz
- Operating speed: 49 km/h (30 mph), including halts
- Average length: 11 Coaches
- Track owner: Indian Railways
- Timetable number: 12
- Rake maintenance: Chennai Egmore

The Chennai Egmore–Puducherry Auroville Express is an express train belonging to the Southern Railway zone that runs between Chennai Egmore and Puducherry in India via Viluppuram Junction. The Express train between Madras and Pondicherry, introduced on 15- 12-1970, was cancelled 1-.4-1988. It is currently being operated with 16115/16116 train numbers on a daily basis.

== Service ==
The 16115/Chennai Egmore–Puducherry Auroville Express has an average speed of 46 km/h and covers 196 km in 4h 15m. The 16116/Puducherry–Chennai Egmore Auroville Express has an average speed of 49 km/h and covers 196 km in 3h 55m.

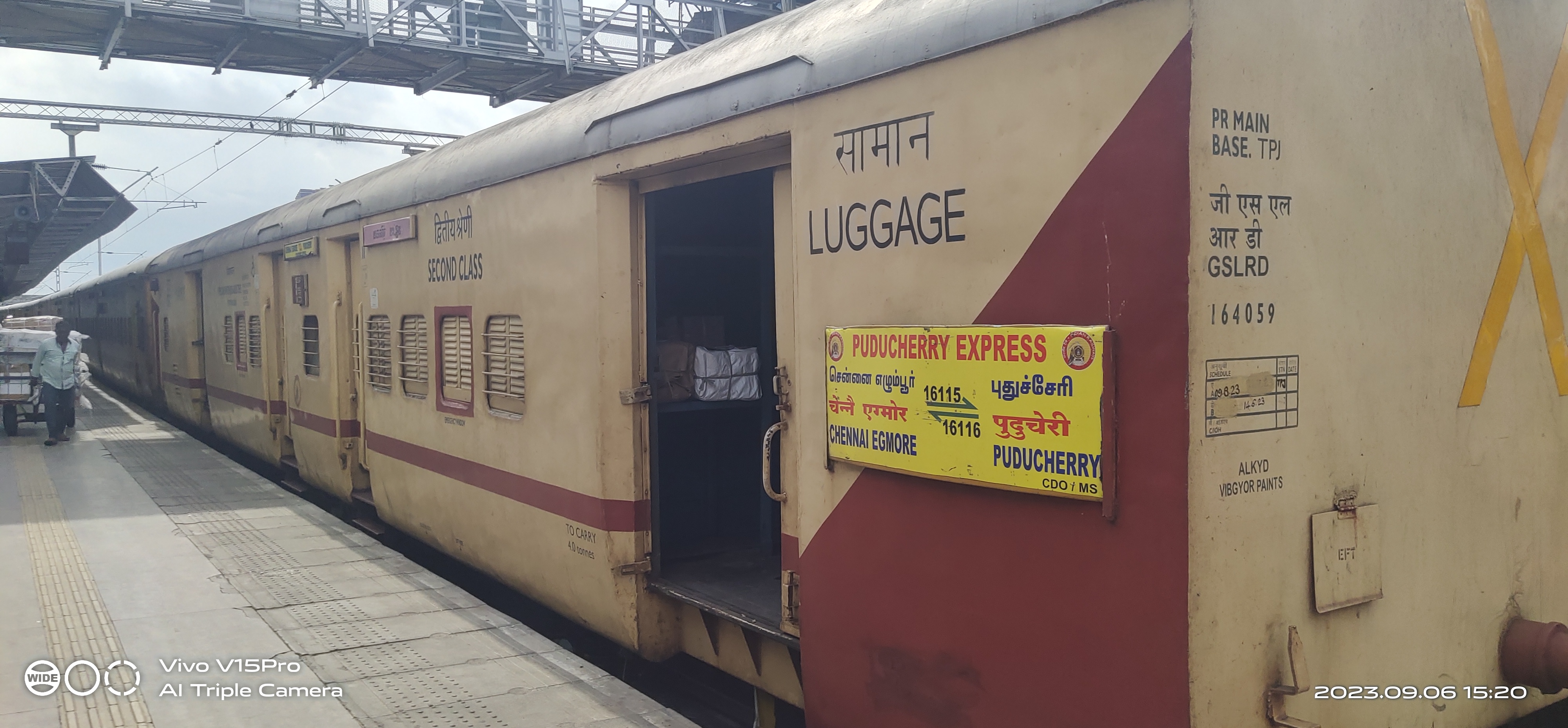

== Coach composition ==
The train runs consists of 11 carriages:

Loco	1	2	3	4	5	6	7	8	9	10	11
	SLRD	UR	UR	UR	UR	UR	UR	D1	D2	UR	SLRD

== Traction ==
Both trains are hauled by an

- Arakkonam Loco Shed, Erode Loco Shed -based WAP-4
- Erode Loco Shed -based WAP-1

electric locomotive from Chennai to Puducherry and vice versa.

== See also ==
- Chennai Egmore railway station
- Puducherry railway station
