= Manamadurai–Virudhunagar line =

Railway line in India

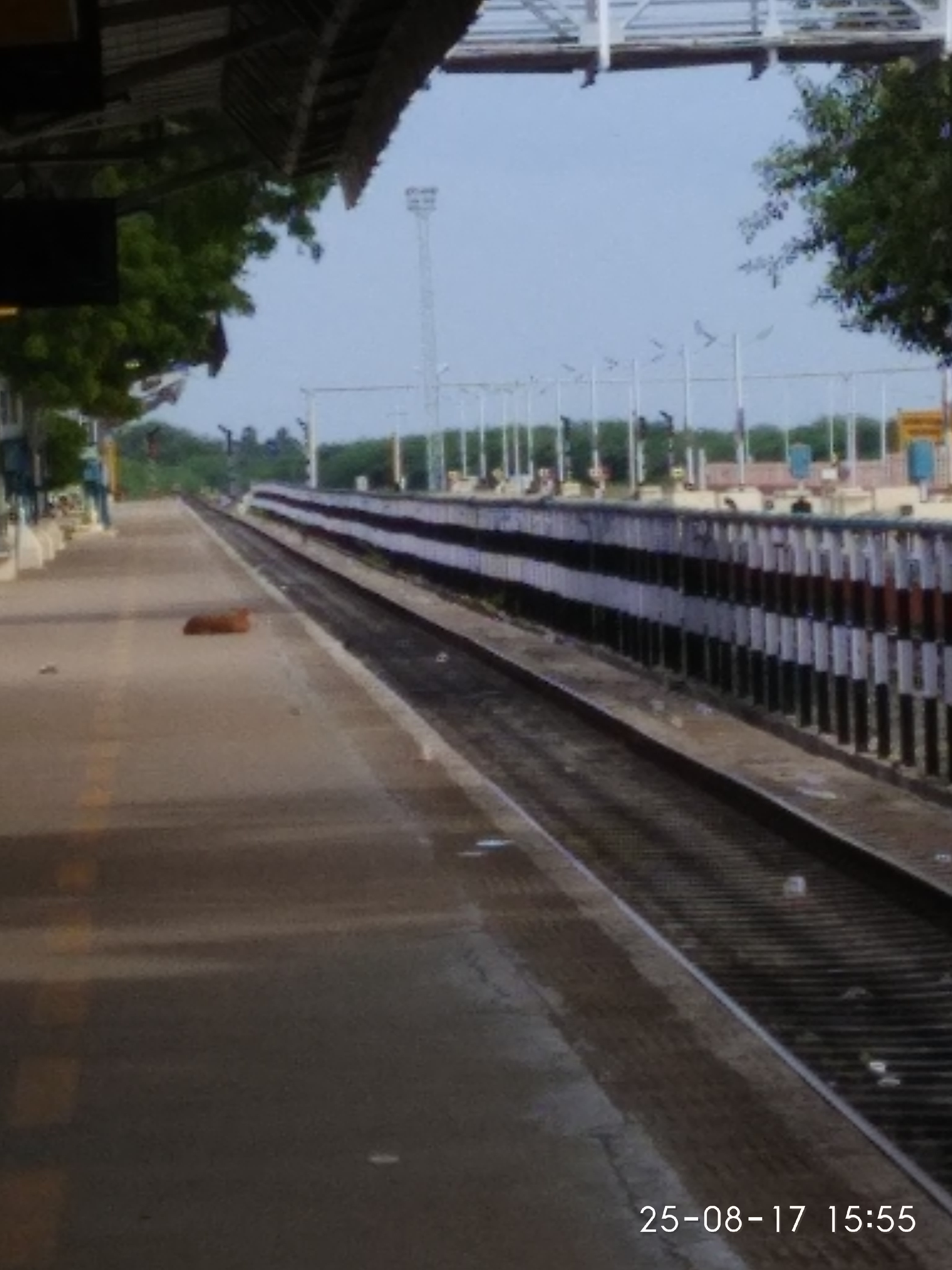
- Manamadurai Junction railway station

Overview
- Status: Operating
- Owner: Indian Railways
- Locale: Tamil Nadu
- Termini: Manamadurai Junction (MNM); Virudhunagar Junction (VPT)
- Stations: 5
- Website: www.sr.indianrailways.gov.in

Service
- Type: Express train Passenger train
- Services: 3
- Operator: Southern Railway zone
- Depot: Golden Rock

History
- Opened: 2 May 1964; 62 years ago
- Reopened: 21 June 2013

Technical
- Line length: 67 km (42 mi)
- Track gauge: 1,676 mm (5 ft 6 in)
- Old gauge: Meter Gauge
- Loading gauge: 4,725 mm × 3,660 mm (15 ft 6.0 in × 12 ft 0.1 in) (BG)
- Operating speed: 80 km/h (50 mph)
- Signalling: Railway Signalling

The Manamadurai–Virudhunagar line is a railway line connecting Virudhunagar and Manamadurai towns in Tamil Nadu.

== History ==
A new railway line from Manamadurai Junction–Virudhunagar Junction was proposed in the Third Five Year plan, which was supposed to ease the pressure on the existing Manamadurai Junction–Madurai Junction and Madurai Junction–Virudhunagar Junction sections. On 1 September 1963, the 22.66 kilometres (14.08 mi) Virudhunagar Junction–Aruppukkottai section was opened, along with Aruppukkottai railway station in the same year by the then Chief Minister of Tamil Nadu, K. Kamaraj. And on 2 May 1964, the rest of 43.89 kilometres (27.27 mi) Aruppukkottai–Manamadurai Junction section was thrown to traffic. Opened with meter gauge tracks, the 67 kilometres (42 mi) section had Five crossing railway stations viz.,mallankinaru, Aruppukkottai, Tiruchchuli, Narikkudi, Kadambankulam catering immensely the passengers of the region and Tuticorin for traffic of goods. When this Route converted to broad gauge Mallankinaru(MNKR) and Kadambankulam(KMBK) stations are abonded due to low patronage.

== Development ==
The conversion from metre gauge to broad gauge was effected and the section was closed for operation during 2008. The section which had 22 unstaffed level crossings underwent safety inspection on 21 June 2013 for operational fitness. Finally, at a cost of ₹231.58 crore (US$25 million) the broad gauge section consisting of five major bridges, 145 minor bridges and five railway stations (including 3 crossing stations) under Virudhunagar and Sivaganga districts was re-opened for traffic on 14 July 2013 by the Union Minister of state for Civil Aviation, K. C. Venugopal.
