= Pandian Express =

Indian Railways train

Pandian Superfast Express

Overview
- Service type: Superfast
- Status: Active
- Locale: Tamil Nadu, India
- First service: 1 October 1969; 56 years ago
- Current operator: Southern Railway zone
- Ridership: Superfast Express

Route
- Termini: Chennai Egmore (MS); Madurai Junction (MDU)
- Stops: 08
- Distance travelled: 493 km (306 mi)
- Average journey time: 07hrs 45min
- Service frequency: Daily
- Train number: 12637 / 12638

On-board services
- Classes: 1A, 2A, 3A, SL, II & EOG
- Disabled access: Disabled access
- Seating arrangements: Yes (Un-Reserved Compartments)
- Sleeping arrangements: Yes (Berth)
- Catering facilities: No
- Observation facilities: Windows in all carriages
- Other facilities: CCTV Camera in all coaches

Technical
- Rolling stock: WAP-7 locomotive from Electric Loco Shed, Erode and Electric Loco Shed, Royapuram
- Track gauge: 1,676 mm (5 ft 6 in)
- Electrification: 25 kV AC 50 Hz
- Operating speed: 71 km/h (44 mph) (Maximum Permissible Speed 130 km/h)
- Rake maintenance: Madurai
- Rake sharing: Cholan Superfast Express; Rockfort (Malaikottai) Superfast Express

The Pandian Express is a Superfast overnight express train of the Southern Railway zone of the Indian Railways which runs daily between Madurai Junction and Chennai Egmore via Villupuram, Vridhachalam and Tiruchirappalli. It began running on Wednesday October 1, 1969.

== Introduction ==
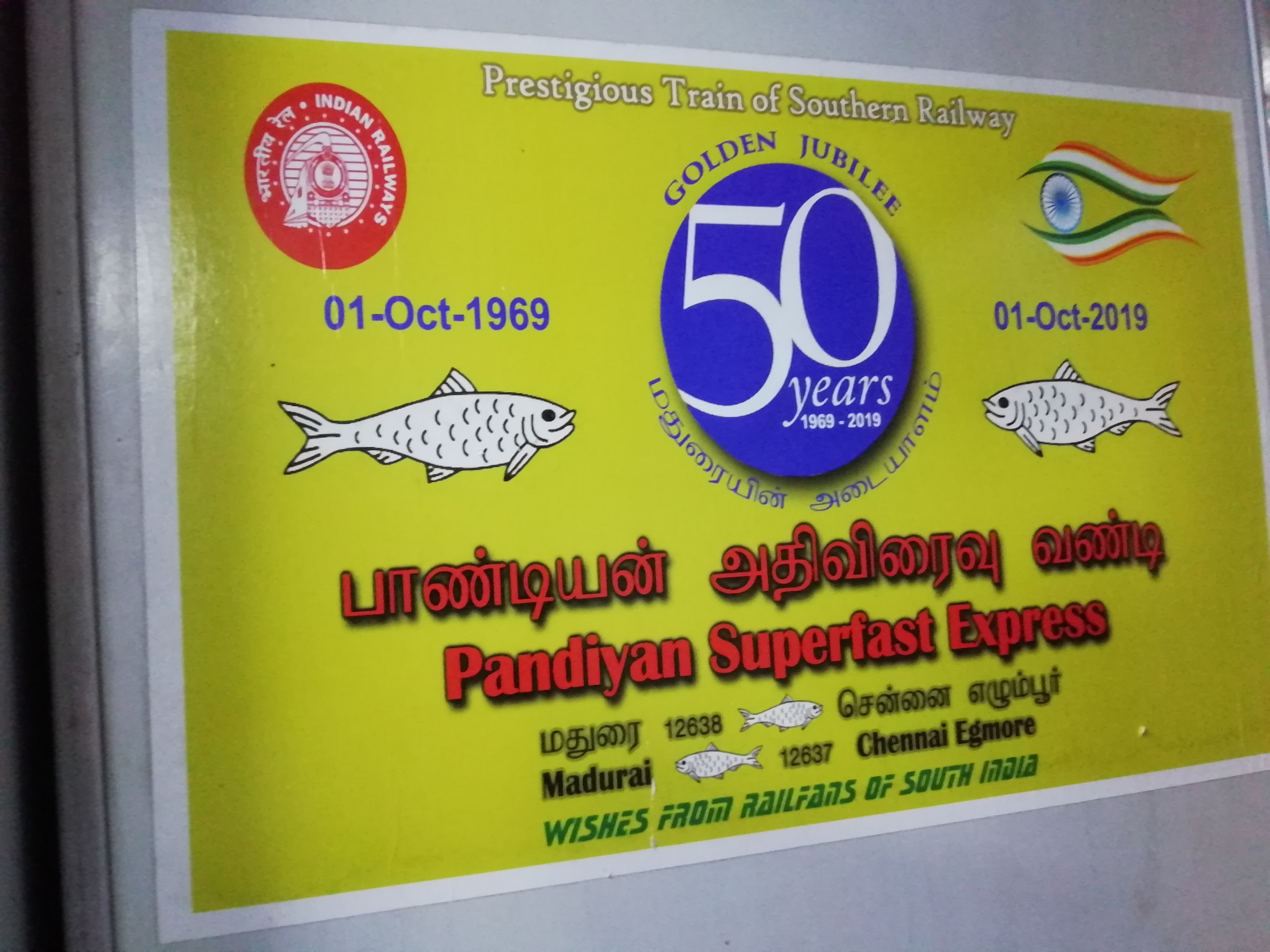
The banner put up by Rail Fans in 2019, to commemorate the Golden Jubilee (completion of 50 Years) of Pandiyan Express

The name of the train commemorates the 6th century BC to 17th century AD Pandyan Dynasty or Pandian Kingdom of Tamil Nadu. It is a standard train consisting of 23 coaches. The main stops on the way are Chengalpattu, Villupuram, Vriddhachalam, Tiruchirappalli and Dindigul. The train operates daily and covers a distance of 493 km (306 mi). The train runs at a top speed of 110 km/h (68 mph). It is a Prestigious train with Southern Railway Zone. It is now running with LHB rakes (Linke Hoffman Busch) from 15 August 2016 and is maintained at Madurai.

50th Anniversary of Pandian Express was celebrated by Railfans and Rail users on 1/10/2019 at Madurai Junction with a cake cut.

This train had the livery changed twice - first it had the "Olive-Green livery", separated by 2 yellow-lines between the upper & lower part of the windows & later on it was changed to "Maroon colour" on the MG.

This train was numbered as 6717/6718 when it was run on MG. It is now hauled by WAP-7 loco from Royapuram Loco Shed from Madurai to Chennai Egmore and via the same route.

== Coach composition ==
There are 22 coaches, including an AC First Class (1A), AC 2 Tier (2A), AC 3 Tier (3A), Sleeper Class (SL), Unreserved general sitting coach (UR) and End on Generators (EOG). RSA with Rockfort Superfast Express/Cholan Express.

Loco	1	2	3	4	5	6	7	8	9	10	11	12	13	14	15	16	17	18	19	20	21	22
	EOG	GS	GS	S7	S6	S5	S4	S3	S2	S1	B6	B5	B4	B3	B2	B1	A3	A2	A1	H1	GS	EOG

== See also ==
- Cheran Express
- Cholan Superfast Express
- Rockfort Superfast Express
- Vaigai Superfast Express
- Nellai Superfast Express
- Pothigai Superfast Express
