= Sengottai railway station =

Railway station in Tamil Nadu, India

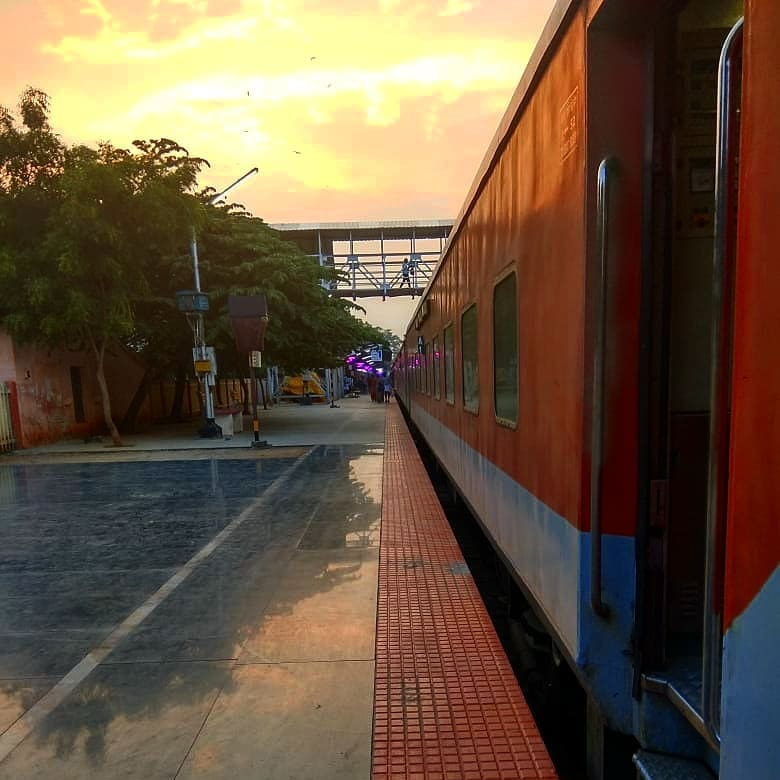
- Sunset time 12662/12661 Podhigai SF Express ready to start from PF NO. 1

General information
- Location: Railway Station Rd, Viswanathapuram, Sengottai, Tenkasi district, Tamil Nadu, 627810; India
- Coordinates: 8.9873°N 77.2420°E
- Elevation: 181 m (594 ft)
- System: Express train and passenger train station
- Owner: Indian Railways
- Operator: Southern Railway zone
- Lines: Kollam–Sengottai branch line, Virudunagar–Sengotttai line
- Platforms: 4
- Tracks: 6
- Connections: Bus stand, taxicab stand, auto rickshaw stand

Construction
- Structure type: Standard (on-ground station)
- Parking: Yes

Other information
- Status: Functioning
- Station code: SCT
- Zone(s): Southern Railway zone
- Division(s): Madurai
- Classification: NSG-5

History
- Opened: 1901

Passengers
- 2022–23: 484,203 (per year); 1,327 (per day)

Services
Preceding station	Indian Railways	Following station
Bhagavathipuram towards	Southern Railway zone Kollam-Chennai	Tenkasi Junction towards
Route map
Location
- Location within Tamil Nadu Location within India

Sengottai railway station (station code: SCT) is an NSG–5 category Indian railway station in Madurai railway division of Southern Railway zone. It serves Sengottai, located in Tenkasi district of the Indian state of Tamil Nadu. It lies on Kollam–Sengottai branch line and Virudunagar–Sengottai line. The Kollam–Shencottah railway line is the first railway line in erstwhile Travancore state and is more than a century old. The Kollam–Sengottai section is part of the Kollam–Chennai metre-gauge rail route commissioned by the British during 1904. The line, originally metre gauge, has been completely converted into broad gauge.

== Overview ==
The Sengottai railway station is in the Southern Railways zone/Madurai division of Indian Railways and falls on the Virudhunagar to Kollam line. The station code is SCT.

== History ==
The first idea of rail link from Tirunelveli to Kollam which was the trading capital of the Travancore Kingdom was conceived in 1873. The line was sanctioned by the Madras Presidency in 1899 and the survey was completed in 1900. The railway line was built jointly by South Indian railway, Travancore state and Madras Presidency. It was the ruler's desire to create a rail link between Kollam, the then commercial capital of his State and Madras. The meter gauge line from Kollam to Punalur was inaugurated by on 1 June 1904. The Punalur–Sengottai railway line was inaugurated on 26 November 1904. The construction of the metre-gauge rail route between Kollam–Punalur and Punalur–Shenkottai (Ghats section) along the scenic mountain terrain was started in 1873 by the British engineers and was completed in 1902. Travancore rulers in association with the British prepared the plan for the track through the challenging mountain terrain as it involved construction of long arch bridges over steep valleys and tunnels across the rocky mountains of Western Ghats.

The first goods train travelled on this route in 1902 and a train carrying its first passengers began its run in 1904. The route passes over five large bridges and hundreds of smaller ones while crossing mountain streams and valleys. Passengers are also treated to a breath–taking view of the Western Ghats. The train also passes through five tunnels on this stretch, including the one-kilometer long tunnel between Bhagawathipuram and Arayankavu. The station at Punalur was equipped with a locomotive service centre, Parcel and Timber Depot, Train parking bays, Storage Tanks for water and oil, etc. The scenic Punalur–Shencotta railway lies across the Western Ghats, providing a valuable link across the southern states.

== Layout ==
The station has four platforms, of which all are functional. It also has six tracks used for passenger and shunting purpose.

== Gauge conversion ==
The Punalur–Sengottai section is part of the 325 kilometres (202 mi) Kollam–Sengottai–Tenkasi–Tirunelveli–Thiruchendur gauge conversion project and part of the Tenkasi–Virudhunagar trunk route to Chennai at an estimate of ₹320 crore (US$33 million). The gauge conversion of the Thiruchendur-Sengottai section has been completed and is open to traffic. In Kollam Junction–Shenkottai section the broad gauge conversion is also finished. Now it is serving as the shortest rail-route from Kochi port to Tuticorin port. Infrastructure of the station will be changed as proposed in tune with handling demands.

== Timetable ==
=== Trains arr/dep from Sengottai ===
Train no/name	Origin	Destination	Sengottai arr time	Sengottai dep time	Service
16791/TN - PGT Palaruvi Exp	Tuticorin	Palakkad Jn	12:40am	12:45am	Daily
16792/PGT - TN Palaruvi EXP	Palakkad Jn	Tuticorin	02:40am	02:45am	Daily
16101/MS-QLN QUILON MAIL	Chennai Egmore	Kollam Jn	03:45am	03:50am	Daily
16362/VLNK-ERS BI-WEEKLY EXP (Sun., TUE)	Vellankanni	Ernakulam Jn	04:15am	04:20am	Mon., Wed.
16846/SCT- Erode Jn UR EXP	Sengottai	Erode Jn	--	05:00am	Daily
06682/SCT-TEN UR Exp	Sengottai	Tirunelveli Jn	--	06:40am	Daily
16848/SCT-MV UR EXP	Sengottai	Mayiladuthurai Jn	--	07:05am	Daily
12661/MS-SCT Podhigai SF Exp	Chennai Egmore	Sengottai	08:15am	--	Daily
20681 /MS-SCT SILAMBU SF EXP (W, F, SA)	Chennai Egmore	Sengottai	08:45am	--	Thurs., Sat., Sun.
06685/TEN-SCT UR Exp	Tirunelveli Jn	Sengottai	09:05am	--	Daily
06684/SCT-TEN UR Exp	Sengottai	Tirunelveli Jn	--	10:05am	Daily
06504/Madurai - Sengottai Express Special (UR)	Madurai Jn	Sengottai	--	10:35am	Daily
20683/TBM-SCT Tri-Wkly SF Exp (via Tirunelveli Jn)	Tambaram	Sengottai	10:50am	--	Sun., Tue., Thur. (from Tambaram)
06681/TEN-SCT UR Exp	Tirunelveli Jn	Sengottai	11:50am	--	Daily
06659/SCT-QLN UR Exp	Sengottai	Kollam Jn	--	12:00pm	Daily
06664/SCT-MDU UR Express	Sengottai	Madurai Jn	--	12:10pm	Daily
06660/Kollam Jn - Sengottai UR Exp	Kollam Jn	Sengottai	02:40pm	--	Daily
06658/SCT-TEN UR Exp	Sengottai	Tirunelveli Jn	--	02:55Pm	Daily
16102/QLN-MS QUILON Mail	Kollam Jn	Chennai Egmore	03:00pm	03:05pm	Daily
16327/Madurai - Guruvayur EXP	Madurai Jn	Guruvayur	03:20Pm	03:25Pm	Daily
16328/Guruvayur - Madurai Express	Guruvayur	Madurai Jn	03:40Pm	03:45pm	Daily
06687/TEN-SCT UR Exp	Tirunelveli Jn	Sengottai	04:10pm	--	Daily
20684/SCT-TBM Tri-Wkly SF Exp (via Tirunelveli Jn)	Sengottai	Tambaram	--	04:15pm	Mon., Wed., Fri. (from Sengottai)
20682/Silambu Super Fast Express	Sengottai	Chennai Egmore	--	04:50pm	Thursday, Saturday, Sunday
06686/SCT-TEN UR Exp	Sengottai	Tirunelveli Jn	--	05:50Pm	Daily
12662/Pothigai Superfast Express	Sengottai	Chennai Egmore	--	06:20pm	Daily
16361/Ernakulam - Velankanni BI-WEEKLY EXP (via Pattukottai)	Ernakulam Jn	Velankanni	08:00pm	08:05pm	Sat., Mon.
06657/TEN-SCT UR Exp	Tirunelveli Jn	Sengottai	08:20pm	--	Daily
16847/Mayiladuthurai - Sengottai Express (UnReserved)	Mayiladuthurai Jn	Sengottai	09:30pm	--	Daily
16845/Erode Jn - Sengottai UR EXP	Erode Jn	Sengottai	11:10pm	--	Daily

== Performance and earnings ==
For the FY 2022–23, the annual earnings of the station was ₹79,966,250 (US$830,000) and daily earnings was ₹219,086 (US$2,300). For the same financial year, the annual passenger count was 484,203 and daily count was 1,327. The footfall per day was recorded as 2,391.
