= Mayiladuthurai–Sengottai Express =

Regional daily train service in India

Overview
- Service type: Mail/Express
- Status: Active
- Locale: Tamil Nadu
- Predecessor: Mayiladuthurai–Dindigul–Mayiladuthurai (16847/16848) Madurai–Sengottai–Madurai (06665/06662)
- First service: 2022 (4 years ago)
- Current operator: Southern Railway zone
- Ridership: Mail/Express
- Website: www.indianrailways.gov.in

Route
- Termini: Mayiladuthurai Junction (MV); Sengottai (SCT)
- Stops: 30
- Distance travelled: 450.7 km (280.1 mi)
- Average journey time: 8 Hours 40 Minutes
- Service frequency: Daily
- Train numbers: 16847 (UP); 16848 (DOWN)
- Lines used: MV - TPJ : Mayiladuthurai - Thanjavur - Tiruchchirappalli Main Line; TPJ - DG : Tiruchchirappalli - Dindigul Chord Line; DG - MDU : Dindigul - Madurai Main Line; MDU - VPT : Madurai - Virudhunagar section of the Madurai - Tuticorin line; VPT - SCT : Virudhunagar - Rajapalayam - Tenkasi - Sengottai line

On-board services
- Class: 13 Unreserved (GS)
- Disabled access: Disabled access
- Seating arrangements: Corridor coach (unreserved)
- Catering facilities: No
- Observation facilities: Windows in all carriages
- Entertainment facilities: No
- Baggage facilities: Overhead racks Baggage carriage

Technical
- Track gauge: 1,676 mm (5 ft 6 in)
- Electrification: 25 kV AC 50 Hz (Overhead Electric Traction)
- Operating speed: 65 kilometres per hour (40 mph)
- Average length: 14 Coaches
- Track owner: Indian Railways
- Timetable number: 69 / 69A
- Rake maintenance: Mayiladuthurai Junction

The Mayiladuthurai–Sengottai Unreserved Express is a regional daily train service connecting Mayiladuthurai Junction in Tamil Nadu with Sengottai railway station via Thanjavur Junction, Tiruchchirappalli Junction and Madurai Junction.

== Overview ==
From 24 October 2022, Southern Railway combined two existing unreserved express services, the Mayiladuthurai–Dindigul–Mayiladuthurai and Madurai–Sengottai–Madurai services, to operate a single train between Mayiladuthurai and Sengottai. The coach composition of the trains are twelve general compartment coaches and two second class cum luggage coaches.

== Rake sharing ==
The Mayiladuthurai–Sengottai Express (16847/16848) shares its rakes with several passenger services operating between Madurai, Sengottai, Tirunelveli, Mayiladuthurai, Thanjavur and Tiruchchirappalli. The rake-sharing arrangement consists of four rakes maintained at Mayiladuthurai (MDU), following the sequence:

1. 56771 – Madurai–Sengottai Passenger
2. 56776 – Sengottai–Tirunelveli Passenger
3. 56775 – Tirunelveli–Sengottai Passenger
4. 16848 – Sengottai–Mayiladuthurai Express
5. 56739 – Mayiladuthurai–Thanjavur Passenger
6. 56745 – Thanjavur–Tiruchchirappalli Passenger
7. 56700 – Tiruchchirappalli–Mayiladuthurai Passenger
8. 16847 – Mayiladuthurai–Sengottai Express
9. 56774 – Sengottai–Tirunelveli Passenger
10. 56773 – Tirunelveli–Sengottai Passenger
11. 56772 – Sengottai–Madurai Passenger

=== Coach composition ===
Loco	1	2	3	4	5	6	7	8	9	10	11	12	13	14
	SLR	GEN	GEN	GEN	GEN	GEN	GEN	GEN	GEN	GEN	GEN	GEN	GEN	SLR

== Schedule ==
16847 – Mayiladuthurai–Sengottai Express
Station/Junction name	Station code	Arrival	Departure	Day
Mayiladuthurai Junction	MV	—	12:35	1
Kuttalam	KTM	12:47	12:48	1
Aduturai	ADT	12:57	12:58	1
Kumbakonam	KMU	13:06	13:08	1
Papanasam	PML	13:17	13:18	1
Thanjavur Junction	TJ	13:39	13:41	1
Budalur	BAL	13:57	13:58	1
Tiruverumbur	TRB	14:13	14:14	1
Manjattidal	MCJ	14:19	14:20	1
Tiruchchirappalli Junction	TPJ	14:40	14:45	1
Kolatur	KLS	15:00	15:01	1
Manapparai	MPA	15:13	15:15	1
Vaiyampatti	VPJ	15:24	15:25	1
Vadamadurai	VDM	15:39	15:40	1
Dindigul Junction	DG	15:57	16:00	1
Kodaikanal Road	KQN	16:16	16:18	1
Madurai Junction	MDU	17:10	17:15	1
Tirupparankundram	TDN	17:26	17:27	1
Tirumangalam	TMQ	17:35	17:36	1
Kalligudi	KGD	17:44	17:45	1
Virudunagar Junction	VPT	18:03	18:05	1
Tiruttangal	TTL	18:22	18:23	1
Sivakasi	SVKS	18:29	18:30	1
Srivilliputtur	SVPR	18:44	18:45	1
Rajapalayam	RJPM	18:59	19:00	1
Sankarankovil	SNKL	19:22	19:23	1
Pamba Kovil Shandy	PBKS	19:34	19:35	1
Kadayanallur	KDNL	19:49	19:50	1
Tenkasi Junction	TSI	20:13	20:15	1
Sengottai	SCT	20:55	—	1

16848 – Sengottai–Mayiladuthurai Express
Station/Junction name	Station code	Arrival	Departure	Day
Sengottai	SCT	—	07:00	1
Tenkasi Junction	TSI	07:13	07:15	1
Kadayanallur	KDNL	07:29	07:30	1
Pamba Kovil Shandy	PBKS	07:41	07:42	1
Sankarankovil	SNKL	07:54	07:55	1
Rajapalayam	RJPM	08:14	08:15	1
Srivilliputtur	SVPR	08:26	08:27	1
Sivakasi	SVKS	08:39	08:40	1
Tiruttangal	TTL	08:47	08:48	1
Virudunagar Junction	VPT	09:13	09:15	1
Kalligudi	KGD	09:24	09:25	1
Tirumangalam	TMQ	09:34	09:35	1
Tirupparankundram	TDN	09:44	09:45	1
Madurai Junction	MDU	10:05	10:10	1
Kodaikanal Road	KQN	10:43	10:45	1
Dindigul Junction	DG	11:10	11:15	1
Vadamadurai	VDM	11:30	11:31	1
Vaiyampatti	VPJ	11:49	11:50	1
Manapparai	MPA	12:14	12:15	1
Kolatur	KLS	12:24	12:25	1
Tiruchchirappalli Junction	TPJ	12:55	13:00	1
Manjattidal	MCJ	13:14	13:15	1
Tiruverumbur	TRB	13:22	13:23	1
Budalur	BAL	13:37	13:38	1
Thanjavur Junction	TJ	13:54	13:56	1
Papanasam	PML	14:15	14:16	1
Kumbakonam	KMU	14:28	14:30	1
Aduturai	ADT	14:40	14:41	1
Kuttalam	KTM	14:51	14:52	1
Mayiladuthurai Junction	MV	15:40	—	1

== See also ==
- Mannargudi–Mayiladuthurai Passenger
- Mayiladuthurai Junction railway station
