= Kollam Mail Express =

Premsagar Pansare

Kollam Express Quilon Mail Royal Mail
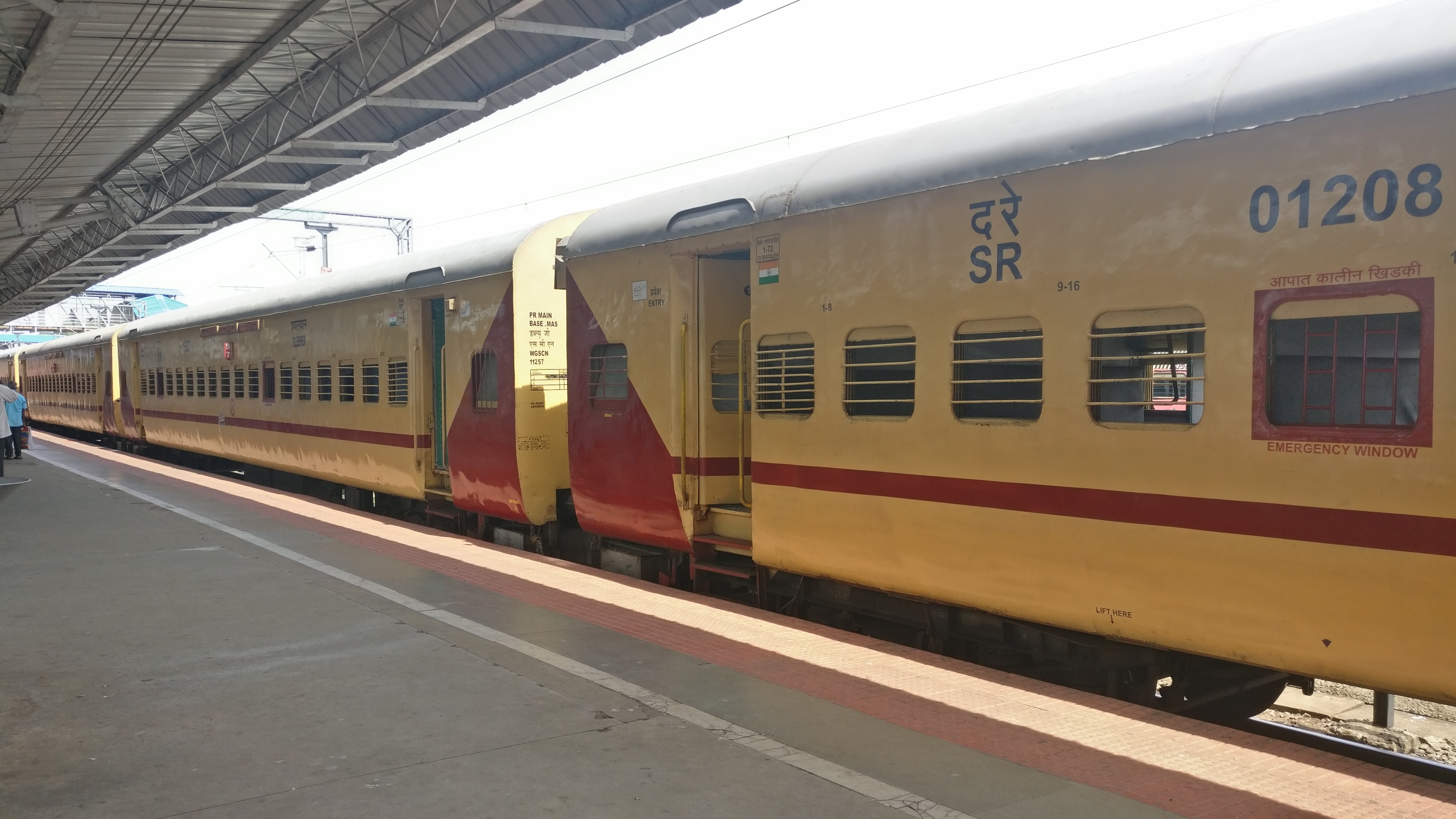
- Chennai Egmore–Kollam Junction Express at Kollam Junction

Overview
- Service type: Express
- Status: Operating
- Locale: Kerala & Tamil Nadu
- First service: 26 November 1918; 0 days' time Re-introduced on 4 March 2019; 6 years ago
- Current operator: Indian Railways

Route
- Termini: Chennai Egmore (MS); Kollam Junction (QLN)
- Stops: 21
- Distance travelled: 761 km (473 mi)
- Average journey time: 14 hours (Up & Down)
- Service frequency: Daily
- Train number: 16101/16102

On-board services
- Classes: AC 2 tier, AC 3 tier, Sleeper 3 tier, General Unreserved
- Seating arrangements: Yes
- Sleeping arrangements: Couchette cars
- Catering facilities: No
- Observation facilities: Large windows

Technical
- Rolling stock: LHB coach Indian AC Electric locomotive WAP-7 in QLM⇋MS section
- Track gauge: 5 ft 6 in (1,676 mm); Indian broad gauge
- Rake maintenance: Chennai Egmore
Route map
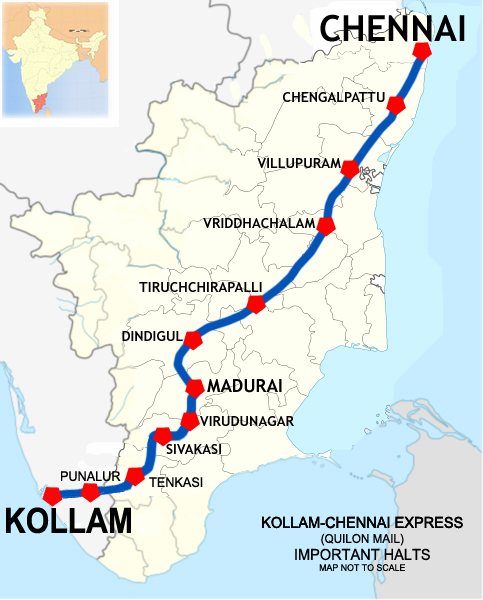

The Chennai Egmore–Kollam Junction Express (16101/16102), also known as Quilon Mail and Royal Mail, is a daily train that runs between Chennai Egmore and Kollam Junction in India. It is the successor of 106-year-old Quilon Mail (105/106), which ran once upon a time in metre-gauge lines between Madras and Quilon.

== History ==
Opened on 1 June 1904, the Quilon–Madras rail line was the 2nd Railway line in Travancore. Its official gauge conversion started in 1998 and completed in 2018. On 31 March 2018, the entire Kollam–Sengottai line was opened for passenger train service. The first passenger train was the Tambaram–Kollam–Tambaram special train (06027) that earned Rs 3.15 lakh by carrying 879 passengers against a capacity of 712. The line provides a shorter route to Thiruvananthapuram via Kollam. Other routes include: Coimbatore and Pollachi to Palakkad, from Madurai via Kanyakumari.

On 4 March 2019, railway started daily service between Kollam Junction and Chennai Egmore by extending Tambaram–Kollam tri-weekly special train to Chennai Egmore and increased the frequency as a daily service. The service was speeded-up by 35 minutes and the number of intermediate stops were reduced to 21 from 25 (Tiruttangal, Pamba Kovil Shandy, Bhagavathipuram, Ezhukone are the four removed from the stoppage list). The daily express train service between Chennai Egmore and Kollam Junction via Madurai Junction, Rajapalayam and Tenkasi Junction was one of the oldest routes in South India. The service was first flagged off by Travancore Maharajah Mulam Thirunal Rama Varma in 1918 as Trivandrum – Madras Mail. IN 1972 The service was Short terminate To Kollam for Trivandrum - Kollam gauge conversions work and diverted through Virudhunagar and Manamadurai in 1996 due to gauge conversion works in Virudhunagar–Madurai stretch. Later, the service discontinued in 2000 for gauge conversion works.

== Route ==
It runs along the British-made historic Quilon–Madras rail route and other chord lines including Kollam–Sengottai which is the shortest existing rail route from Chennai to Kollam via Chengalpattu, Dindigul, Trichy, Madurai, Virudhunagar, Sivakasi, Srivilliputtur, Rajapalayam, Tenkasi and Punalur.

Chennai Egmore→Tambaram →Chengalpattu Junction →Viluppuram Junction →Vriddhachalam Junction →Tiruchchirappalli Junction →Dindigul Junction →Madurai Junction →Virudhunagar Junction →Sivakasi →Srivilliputtur →Rajapalayam →Sankarankovil →Kadayanallur →Tenkasi Junction →Sengottai →Aryankavu →Punalur →Avaneeswaram →Kottarakara →Kundara →Kollam Junction

== Traction ==
As the route is fully electrified, an Arakkonam / Royapuram / Erode WAP-7 locomotive hauls the train from Kollam to Chennai Egmore and back.

The first electric run of Quilon-Chennai mail in the recently electrified Kollam -Sengottai railway line was on 28 July 2024.

The train boasts its legacy to run with coal powered steam engine locomotive, later with diesel locomotive ( first meter gauge then broad gauge ), and finally with electric locomotives.

== Coach composition ==
The train has 17 coaches comprising one A/C two-tier, two A/C three-tier, ten sleeper class, two unreserved general coaches and 2 luggage rakes. (Note: The coach composition is subject to change.)The number of coaches got increased from 14 to 17 from April 9, 2024, subject to positive inspection report submitted by RDSO to Southern Railway for running 22 LHB/24 ICF coaches in the Ghats section. The number of coaches will be further increased in the next phase after the extension of platforms in stations along Kollam-Sengottai section to accommodate 24 coaches.

| Loco | 1 | 2 | 3 | 4 | 5 | 6 | 7 | 8 | 9 | 10 | 11 | 12 | 13 | 14 | 15 | 16 | 17 |
|---|---|---|---|---|---|---|---|---|---|---|---|---|---|---|---|---|---|
| | SLR | GEN | S1 | S2 | S3 | S4 | S5 | S6 | S7 | S8 | S9 | S10 | B1 | B2 | A1 | GEN | SLR |

== See also ==
- Anantapuri Express
- Palaruvi Express
- Silambu Express
- Pothigai Express
- Kollam–Sengottai Chord Line

== Sources ==
- https://indiarailinfo.com/train/96239
- https://indiarailinfo.com/train/96242
