= Tiruttangal railway station =

Railway station in Tamil Nadu, India

Tiruttangal
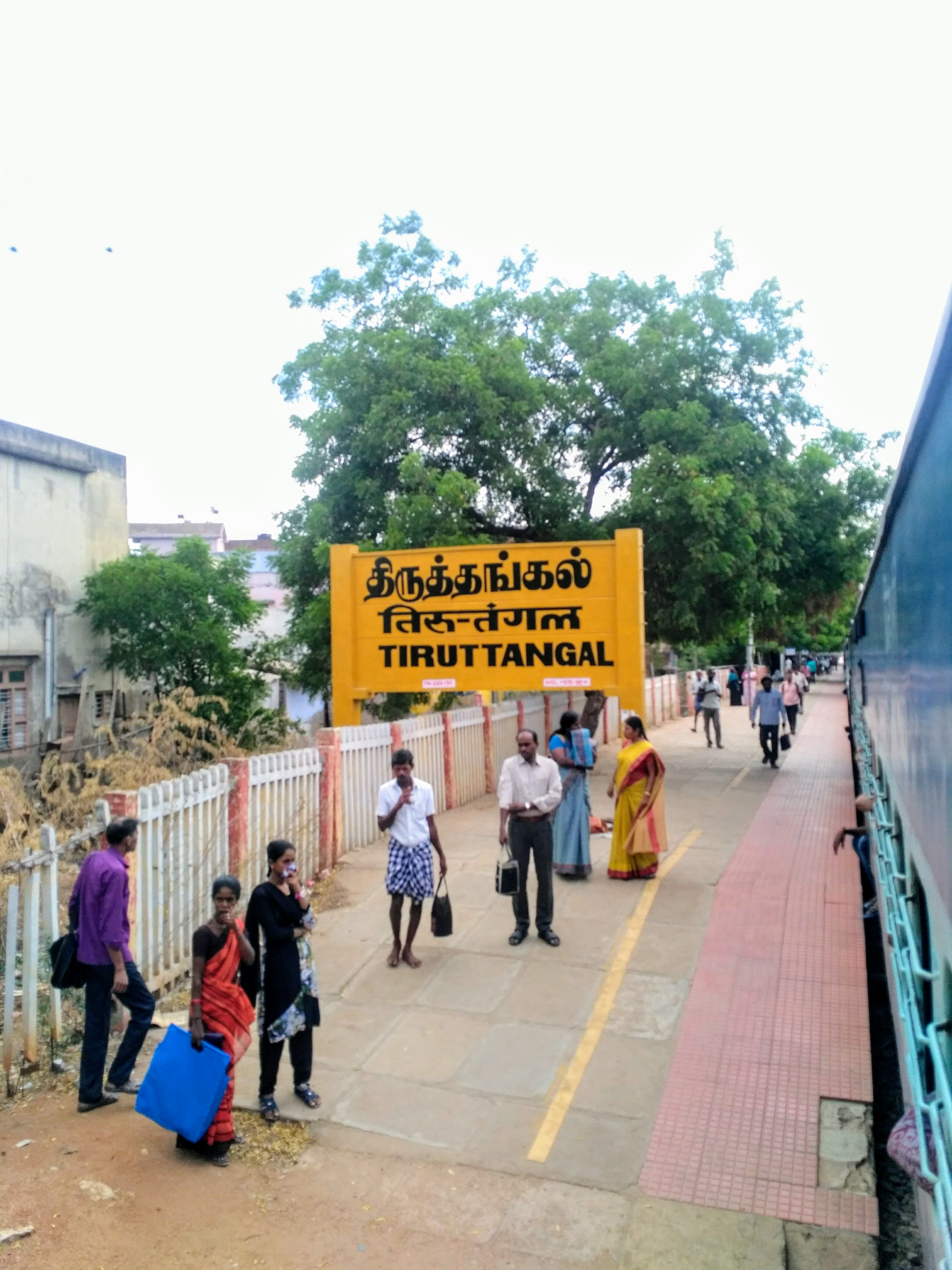
- Thiruttangal railway station

General information
- Location: Thiruthangal, Virudhunagar district, Tamil Nadu; India
- Coordinates: 9.4774°N 77.8110°E
- Elevation: 90 metres (300 ft)
- System: Regional rail & Light rail station
- Owner: Indian Railways
- Operator: Southern Railway zone
- Line: Virudunagar–Sengottai line
- Platforms: 1
- Tracks: 1
- Connections: Taxicab stand, Auto rickshaw stand

Construction
- Structure type: Standard (on ground station)
- Parking: Yes

Other information
- Status: Functioning
- Station code: TTL
- Zone(s): Southern Railway zone
- Division(s): Madurai

History
- Opened: 1932; 94 years ago

Passengers
- 2022–23: 265,111 (per year); 726 (per day)
Route map
Location

Tiruttangal railway station (station code: TTL) is an NSG–5 category Indian railway station in Madurai railway division of Southern Railway zone. It serves Tiruttangal, located in Virudhunagar district of the Indian state of Tamil Nadu.

== Background ==
The station was established during 1932. The station survived a closure during 1984 with strong protests from the residents of Thiruthangal, when the Southern Railway zone initiated such an action.

== Structure and amenities ==
The station lies on the line between Virudhunagar Junction and Tenkasi Junction The station saw major facelift in its facilities for passengers, when R. Chandramogan, a native and resident of Thiruthangal donated ₹30 lakh (US$31,000) for raising the level of platform after the gauge conversion, which wasn't done the respective authorities citing fund crunch. Also reverse osmosis purified water, parcel room, coach indicators and wheelchair ramp for physically challenged were established.

== Performance and earnings ==
For the FY 2022–23, the annual earnings of the station was ₹25,548,196 (US$270,000) and daily earnings was ₹69,995 (US$730). For the same financial year, the annual passenger count was 265,111 and daily count was 726. While, the footfall per day was recorded as 1335.

== Notable places nearby ==
- Badrakali Amman temple, Sivakasi
- Ninra Narayana Perumal temple
