= Satur railway station =

Railway station in Tamil Nadu, India

Satur Sattur

General information
- Other names: Sattur; Saathur
- Location: Sattur, Virudhunagar district, Tamil Nadu; India
- Coordinates: 9.35775384723637°N 77.92224675672794°E
- Elevation: 80 metres (260 ft)
- System: Indian Railways station
- Owner: Indian Railways
- Operator: Southern Railway zone
- Line: Virudhunagar Junction - Vanchi Maniyachchi Junction
- Platforms: 3
- Tracks: 4
- Connections: Bus stand, auto rickshaw stand

Construction
- Structure type: Standard (on-ground station)
- Parking: Available
- Accessible: Disabled access

Other information
- Status: Functioning
- Station code: SRT
- Zone(s): Southern Railway zone
- Division(s): Madurai

History
- Opened: 1876; 150 years ago
- Rebuilt: 1999; 27 years ago (from Meter Gauge to Broad Gauge), 2022; 4 years ago During Double Line

Passengers
- 2022–23: 460,639 (per year); 1,262 (per day)
- Rank: 5
Route map
Location
- Location within India Location within Tamil Nadu

Satur railway station (station code: SRT) is an NSG–5 category Indian railway station in Madurai railway division of Southern Railway zone. It serves Sattur, located in Virudhunagar district of the Indian state of Tamil Nadu. The station was opened in 1876 and rebuilt in 2022 during the double line project. Historical records confirm that Mahatma Gandhi visited Sattur, located in the Virudhunagar district of Tamil Nadu, as part of his travels in the state. Considering the railway's importance for travel at that time, his journeys to and from Sattur likely involved the railway station

== Performance and earnings ==
For the FY 2022–23, the annual earnings of the station was ₹97,777,317 (US$1.0 million) and daily earnings was ₹267,883 (US$2,800). For the same financial year, the annual passenger count was 460,639 and daily count was 1,262. While, the footfall per day was recorded as 2,431.

== Train ==
More than 80 train passes through Satur Railway station. 2 minutes halt provide for 57 trains such as 33 Mail/Express Trains, 22 SuperFast Trains, 2 Antyodaya Trains.
