= Srivilliputtur railway station =

Railway station in Tamil Nadu, India

Srivilliputtur

General information
- Location: Srivilliputhur, Virudhunagar district, Tamil Nadu; India
- Coordinates: 9.4978°N 77.6451°E
- Elevation: 141 metres (463 ft)
- System: Regional rail, Commuter rail & Light rail station
- Owner: Indian Railways
- Operator: Southern Railway zone
- Line: Virudunagar–Sengottai
- Platforms: 2
- Tracks: 2
- Connections: Taxicab stand, Auto rickshaw stand

Construction
- Structure type: At grade
- Parking: Yes

Other information
- Status: Functioning
- Station code: SVPR
- Zone(s): Southern Railway zone
- Division(s): MDU

Passengers
- 2022–23: 202,560 (per year); 555 (per day)
Route map
Location
- Location within India Location within Tamil Nadu

Srivilliputtur railway station (station code: SVPR) is an NSG–5 category Indian railway station in Madurai railway division of Southern Railway zone. It serves Srivilliputtur, located in Virudhunagar district of the Indian state of Tamil Nadu.

== Jurisdiction ==
It belongs to the Madurai railway division of the Southern Railway zone of Virudhunagar district in Tamil Nadu. The station code is SVPR.

== Line ==
The station falls on the line between Virudhunagar Junction and Tenkasi Junction. This railway station is situated about 5 km to the east of the town. The next railway station on the south is Rajapalayam.

== Projects and development ==
It is one of the 73 stations in Tamil Nadu to be named for upgradation under Amrit Bharat Station Scheme of Indian Railways.

== Performance and earnings ==
For the FY 2022–23, the annual earnings of the station was ₹41,408,474 (US$430,000) and daily earnings was ₹113,448 (US$1,200). For the same financial year, the annual passenger count was 202,560 and daily count was 555. While, the footfall per day was recorded as 1,031.
