= Sukkiravarapatti =

- Village
- Location in Tamil Nadu, India Sukkiravarapatti (India)
- Coordinates: 9.5170627°N 77.7950501°E
- Country: India
- State: Tamil Nadu
- District: Virudhunagar

Languages
  - Official: Tamil
- Time zone: UTC+5:30 (IST)
- Postal code: 626130

Sukkiravarapatti is a panchayat village in Sivakasi taluk, Virudhunagar district in the Indian state of Tamil Nadu India.

== Nearest towns ==
- Srivilliputhur
- Thiruthangal
- Sivakasi
