= Karunellinathar temple =

Karunellinathar
- Karunellinathar Swamy Temple
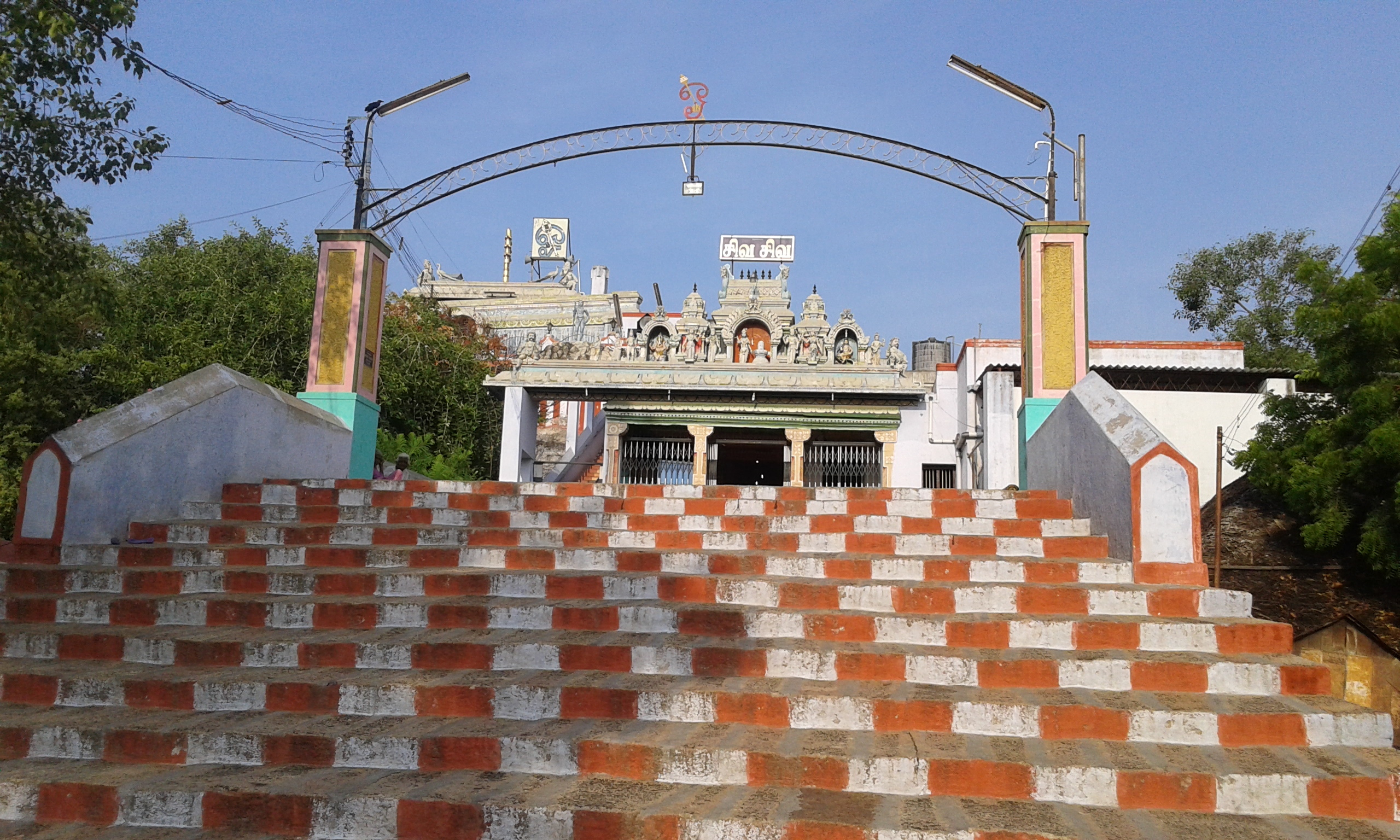

- Location in Tamil Nadu

Religion
- Affiliation: Hinduism
- District: Virudhunagar
- Deity: Karunellinathar (Shiva) Chokki (Parvathi)

Location
- Location: Thiruthangal
- State: Tamil Nadu
- Country: India
- Interactive map of Karunellinathar
- Coordinates: 9°28′51″N 77°48′39″E

Architecture
- Type: Dravidian architecture

Karunellinathar temple is a Hindu temple dedicated to Shiva in Thiruthangal, a town in the outskirts of Sivakasi, in Tamil Nadu, India. Shiva is worshiped as Karunellinathar, and is represented by the lingam and his consort Parvati is depicted as Chokki Amman.

It is built on a hillock 100 ft (30 m) and houses a small gateway tower known as gopurams.

== Legend ==
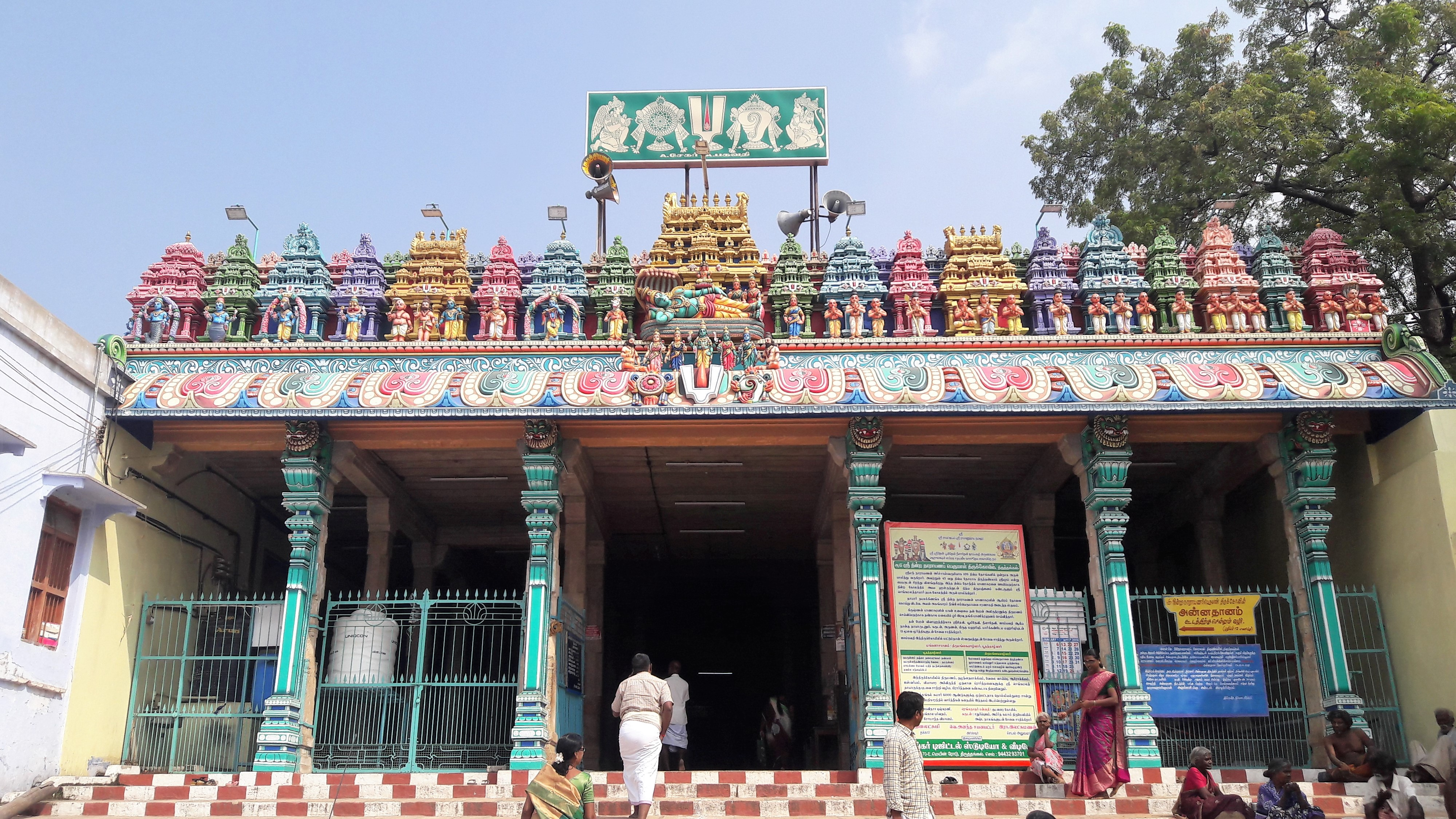
Ninra Narayana Peruma, which is located on the other side of this temple

As per a Hindu legend, Ranganatha (the reclining form of Vishnu) from Srirangam Ranganathaswamy temple was enamoured by the devotion of Andal. He started a journey to Srivilliputhur Divya Desam to seek her hand for marriage. While reaching the place, it became dark and he decided to spend the night in the place. Since he stayed at this place, it came to be known as Thiruthangal and the hillock came to be known as Thalagiri.

As per another legend, the Pandavas from Mahabharatha were living in exile and were roaming around the forest of Western Ghats. They could not get water for performing their daily pooja. As Sun was rising, Arjuna, one of the princes, prayed to Ganga to send water to the place and shot an arrow that split earth and brought forth a river. The river that originated is believed to be the Arjuna river in modern times. The place where the temple was located was believed to be housing two Amla trees (called nelli in Tamil) and hence got the name as Irunellinathar, which later went on to become Karunellinathar.

== History ==
Karunellinathar temple is believed to have been built by Pandyas. There are a host of inscriptions in the temple indicating information related to the gifts offered to the temple. One of the inscription from 1032 CE indicates the temples as Paramaswamy who willingly chose the hillock as his abode. A lake by name of Vallabha Pereri existed by the side of the temple. The temple is believed to have been expanded by Gurukalathirayan, the minister of Sundara Pandya during the Pandyan regime in 1233 CE. Ulli Bomman Kalangatha Kanda nayakar, who attained martyrdom in a war at Thiruthangal, was sanctified by donating the places around Thiruthangal to his family. An image of the warrior is found in the temple.

== The temple ==
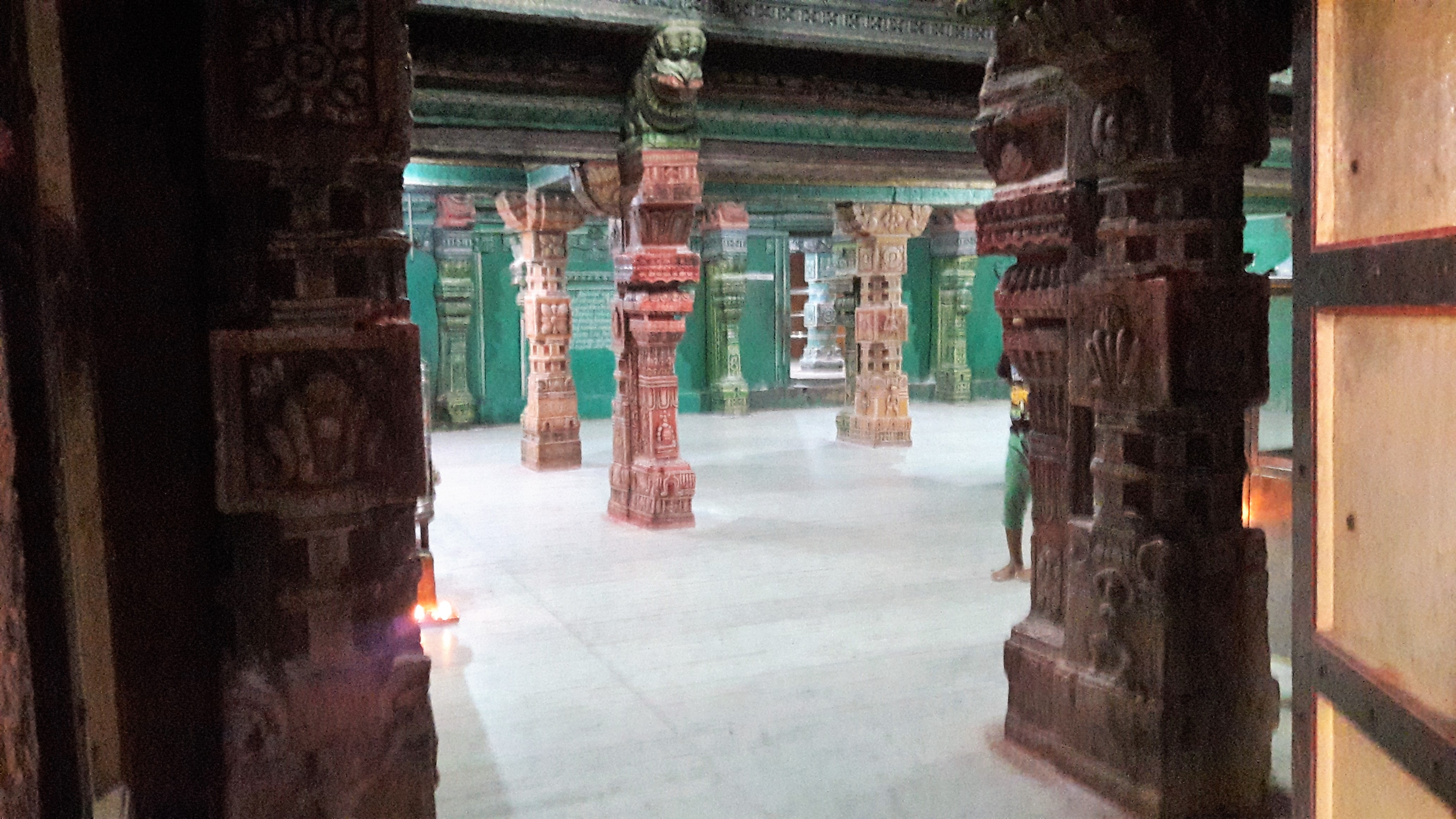
Pillared hall inside the temple

It is built on a hillock 100 ft (30 m) and houses a small gateway tower known as gopurams. The temple has many shrines, with those of Karunellinathar and Chokki Amman being the most prominent. The temple is located on the other side of Ninra Narayana Perumal temple, a Vishnu temple and can be reached from that temple on the hillock. The temple is a rock cut temple and the main shrine of the temple is of Karunellinathar. There are separate shrines for Vinayaka, Surya, Chandra and Dakshinamurthi. There is a huge life size stone image of Nataraja and Sivakami and housed in the dancing hall of the temple.

The temple is more known for the shrine of Palaniandavar, which is found near the entrance of the temple. Arumugha Tambiran was an ardent devotee of Muruga. He used to travel to Palani carrying a kavadi and returned to Thiruthangal the same day. As years rolled by, Thambiran found it difficult to travel all the way to Palani. He used to ascend a few steps and then return. While cooking food one day, god Murugan showered gold coins in his route. He took up the gold coins and built the shrine of Palani Andavar. The place where he died is marked by a mutt and his articles are still maintained.
