= Ninra Narayana Perumal temple =

Vishnu temple in Virudhunagar

Ninra Narayana Perumal Temple
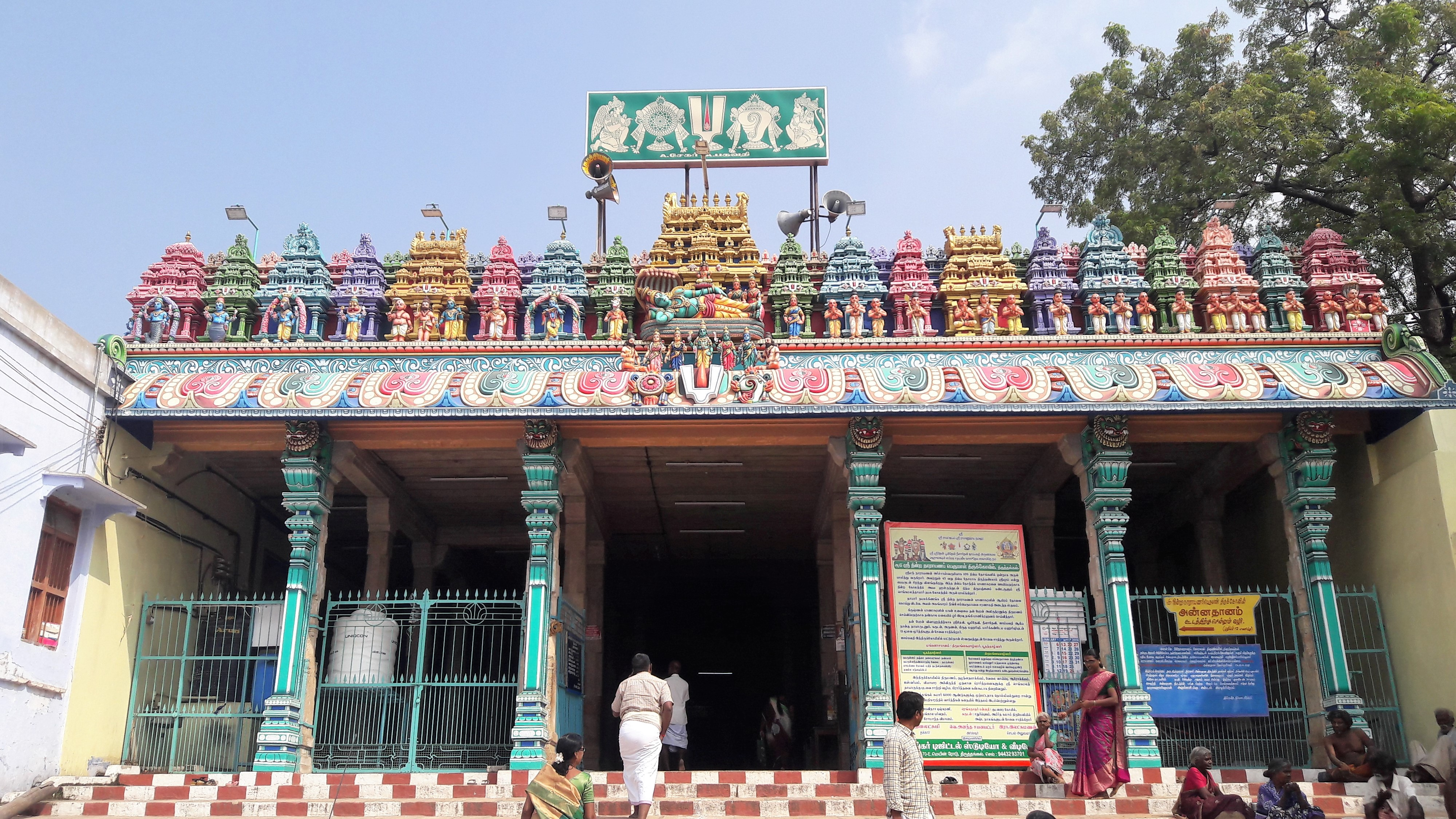
- The gateway tower of the temple with a flight of steps

- Location in Tamil Nadu

Religion
- Affiliation: Hinduism
- District: Virudhunagar
- Deity: Ninra Narayana(Vishnu), Arunakamala Mahadevi (Lakshmi)

Location
- Location: Thiruthangal
- State: Tamil Nadu
- Country: India
- Coordinates: 9°28′54.7″N 77°48′41.7″E

Architecture
- Type: Dravidian architecture
- Inscriptions: 3
- Elevation: 127 m (417 ft)

Ninra Narayana Perumal Temple (also called Nindra Narayana Perumal Temple) in Thiruthangal, a neighborhood of Sivakasi City Municipal Corporation in the South Indian state of Tamil Nadu, is dedicated to the Hindu god Vishnu. Constructed in the Dravidian style of architecture, the temple is glorified in the Divya Prabandha, the early medieval Tamil canon of the Alvar saints from the 6th–9th centuries AD. It is one of the 108 Divya Desam dedicated to Vishnu, who is worshipped as Ninra Narayana and his consort Lakshmi as Arunakamala Mahadevi.

The temple in its present form was believed to have been built by Devendra Vallabha, a Pandya king. The temple has three inscriptions in its two rock-cut caves, two dating from the period of 8th century.

The temple is built on a granite hill 100 ft (30 m) tall and a granite wall surrounds the temple, enclosing all its shrines and bodies of water. Unlike other temples, this temple does not have a rajagopuram, the temple's gateway tower. The later Pandya kings, Vijayanagara and Nayak kings in the region made significant additions to the temple. The temple is located on the other side of Karunellinathar temple, a famous Shiva temple and can be reached from that temple on the hillock.

Ninra Narayana is believed to have appeared to Sridevi and Bhoomadevi. Four daily rituals and many yearly festivals are held at the temple, of which the Vaikasi Vasanthothsavam, Pillai Lokacharyar festival and Kurathalvar festival, each celebrated for ten days, being the most prominent. The temple is maintained and administered by the Hindu Religious and Endowment Board of the Government of Tamil Nadu.

== Legend ==
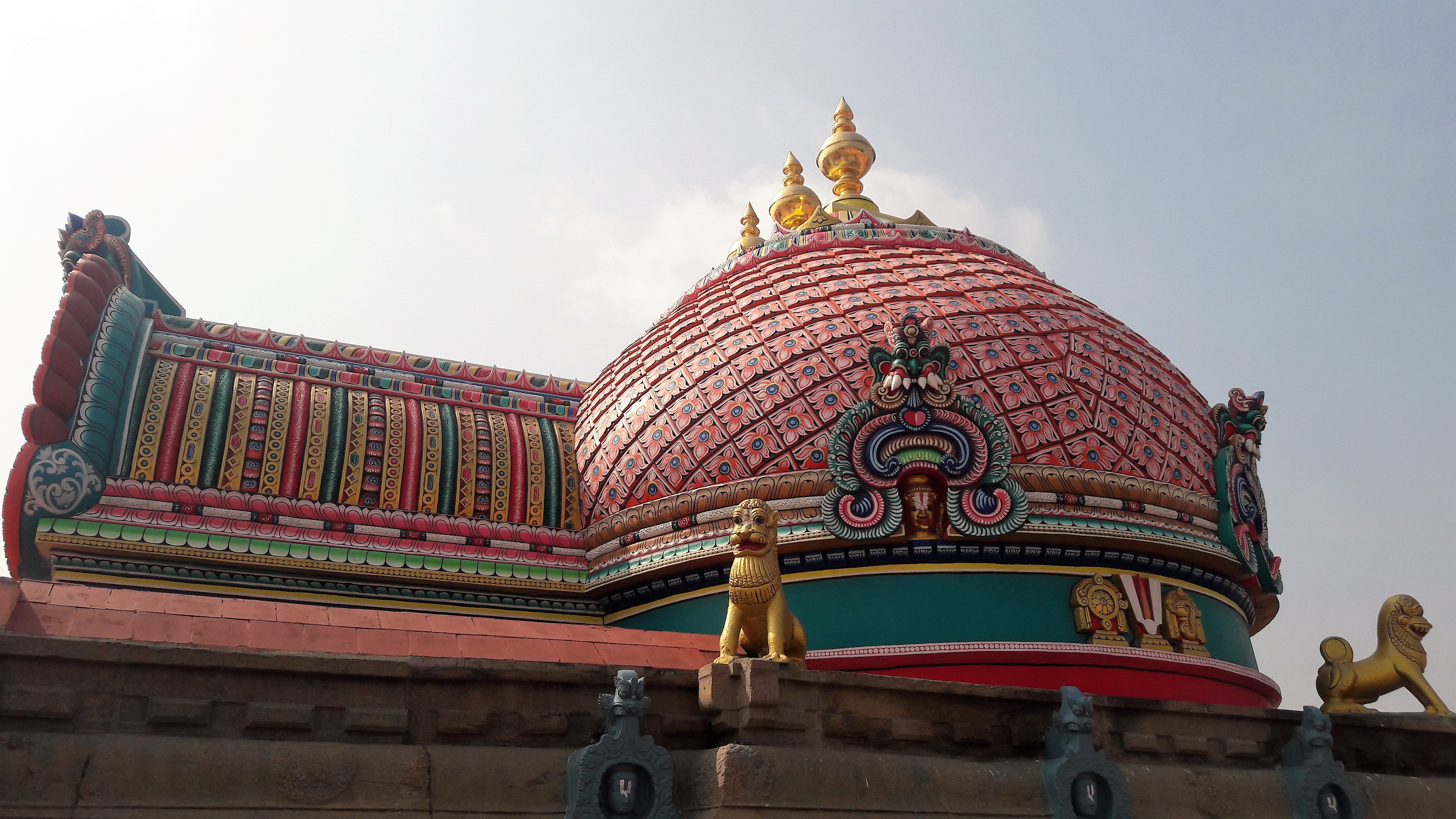
The vimanam of the temple

According to legend, Krishna's grandson, Aniruddha, got married at this place.

As per another legend, Ranganatha from Srirangam Ranganathaswamy temple was enamoured by the devotion of Andal. He started a journey to Srivilliputhur Divya Desam to seek her hand for marriage. While reaching the place, it became dark and he decided to spend the night in the place. Since he stayed at this place, it came to be known as Thiruthangal and the hillock came to be known as Thalagiri.

The temple finds mention in the eighth chapter of Brahmanda Purana that deals with the story of king Puroora Chakravarthy. Puroora was a righteous king of Bharathavarsha and when he became old, he gave his kingdom to his sons. He approached to sages to direct him to the right place to do penance, who directed him to Thiruthangal. After performing austere penance, Mahavishnu appeared to him. Devendra Vallabha, a scion of Pandya dynasty was once hunting a tiger and reached Thiruthangal. While firing an arrow at the tiger, a divine voice explained the history of the tiger. In its previous birth, the tiger was a ruler by name Chandraketu, who did not adhere to the principles of doing penance. He was hence made to be reborn as a tiger. Mahavishnu appeared to both Devendra and the tiger. In commemoration of the event, the rock near the temple is named Puliparai (puli means tiger and parai indicates hill).

There was once an argument between banyan tree and Adishesha as to who would be closer to Vishnu. Brahma, the Hindu god of creation was asked to mediate and he judged in favour of Adishesha, who went on to become the serpent bed of Vishnu. Banyan tree was highly dissatisfied and he started doing intense penance praying to Vishnu at Thiruthangal. Vishnu appeared to the banyan tree and gave him a boon that he would sit over him at Thiruthangal. The rock is thus believed to be the banyan tree and thus came to be known as Thangalgiri. Based on the legend, there is a common belief that the temple provides relief to devotees suffering from mental weariness and physical fatigue.

The temple is maintained and administered by the Hindu Religious and Endowment Board of the Government of Tamil Nadu.

== Architecture ==
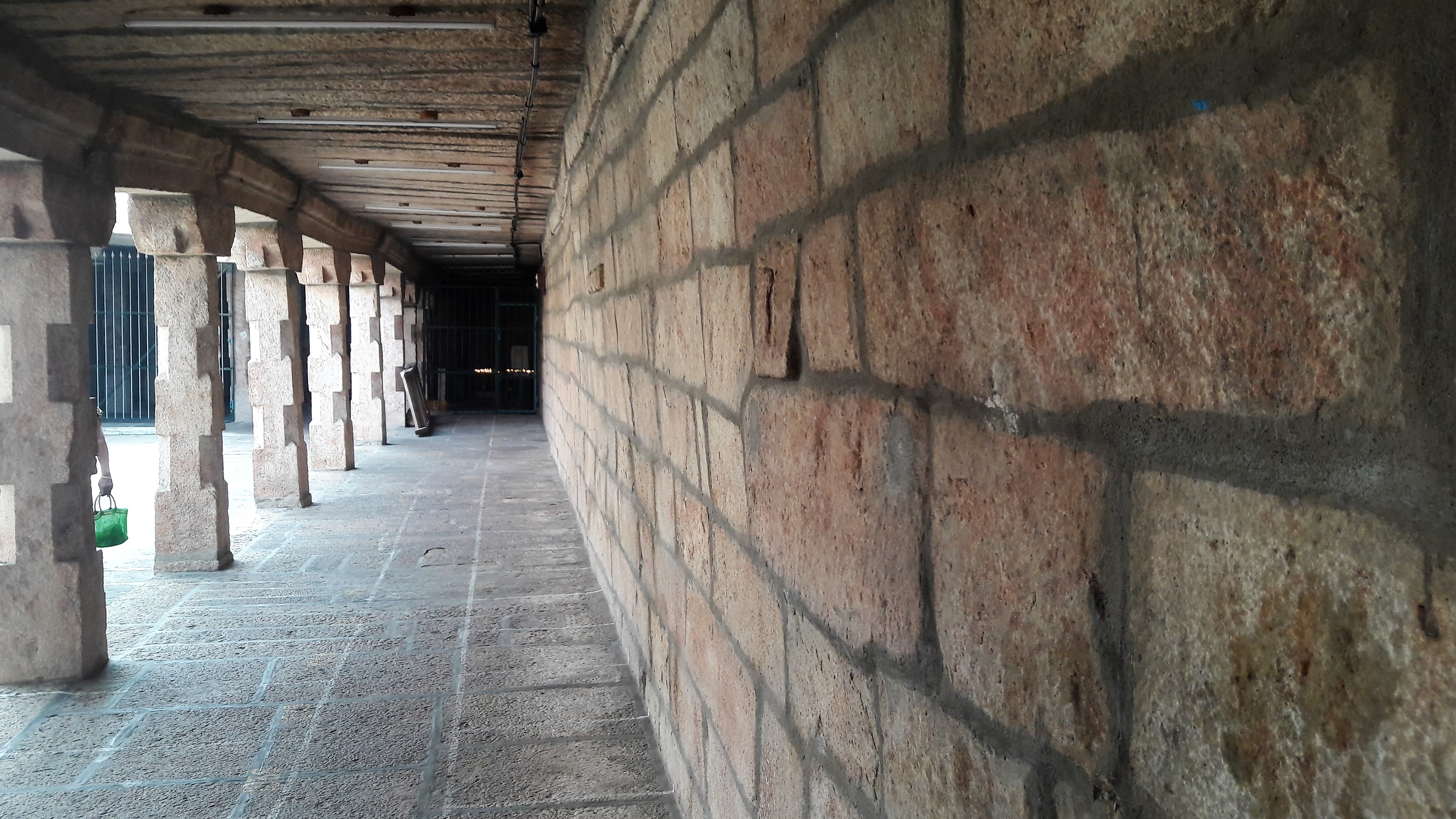
The pillared hall in the entrance of the temple

Ninra Narayana Perumal temple is located in Thiruthangal, a town 2 km (1.2 mi) from Sivakasi, on the Madurai road. The temple is built on a granite hill 100 ft (30 m) tall and a granite wall surrounds the temple, enclosing all its shrines and bodies of water. The temple is located on the other side of Karunellinathar temple, a famous Shiva temple and can be reached from that temple on the hillock. The rajagopuram, the main gateway tower, has a flat structure, compared to other South Indian temples that have a steep structure.

An image of the presiding deity, Ninra Narayana, is seen in a standing posture facing east on the third tier of the temple and sporting Abaya Mudra (right feet gesturing to devotees to surrender to his feet). He is believed to have appeared to Bhudevi and Sridevi, all of whose images are housed inside the sanctum. The tier also houses the Mahamandapam and the shrine of Garuda, the eagle mount of Vishnu. Garuda is seen in a unique posture with a pot of Amrita on his right hand and a serpent in his left hand. His other two hands are seen with supplicating pose. The sanctum is guarded by imposing images of Dvarapalakas, which are believed to be constructed during the rule of Sattur Kolarapatti. The sanctum houses eleven images of Ninra Narayana Perumal, Markendeya, Garuda, Aruna, Viswakarma, Bhudevi, Sridevi on the right and Niladevi, Usha, Aniruddha and Bhrigu to the left. The festival metal image of Thiruthangal Appan is placed in front of the images. The images of the deities are made of stucco and hence ablution is not performed as in other temples. The vimana, the roof over the sanctum is called Somachandra Vimana, is similar to the ones in Srirangam Ranganathaswamy temple and Alagarkovil. The images of Nardanakrishan, Andal, Durga, and Vinayaka are seen on the precinct around the sanctum, while the image of Alvars are housed in the hall leading to the sanctum.

The consort of Ninra Narayana, Aruna Mahadevi (also called "Shenbagavalli") has a separate shrine in the second tier. The Utsavar (festival image) of Arunakamala Mahadevi is called Shenbagavalli and is housed inside the same shrine. Unlike other temples, the image of Thayar is seen in standing posture. All poojas are first performed to Thayar before being done for the presiding deity. The second tier houses the four-pillared hall, vehicle hall and mirror room. A cave temple on the lower tier, bearing the traces of Pandyan art, is located to the West of Kalyana Mandapa. The image of Pallikonda Perumal is housed in the cave, with Sridevi and Bhudevi serving his feet and sages Markandeya and Bhrigu occupying prominent places on either side. The rectangular walls around the temple enclose all the shrines and water bodies associated with the temple. The rajagopuram, the main gateway tower, has a flat structure, compared to other South Indian temples that have a steep structure.

== Religious significance ==
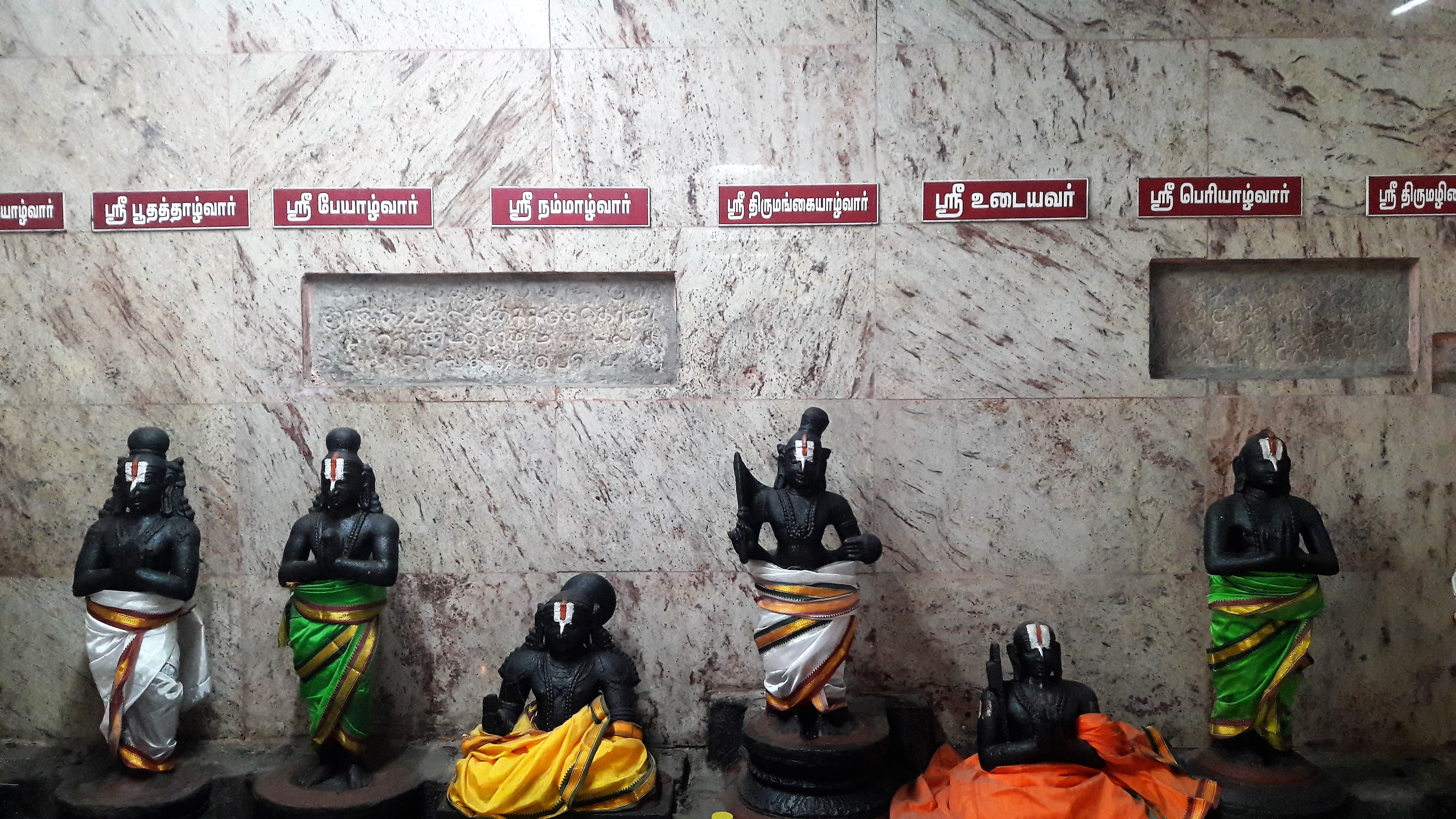
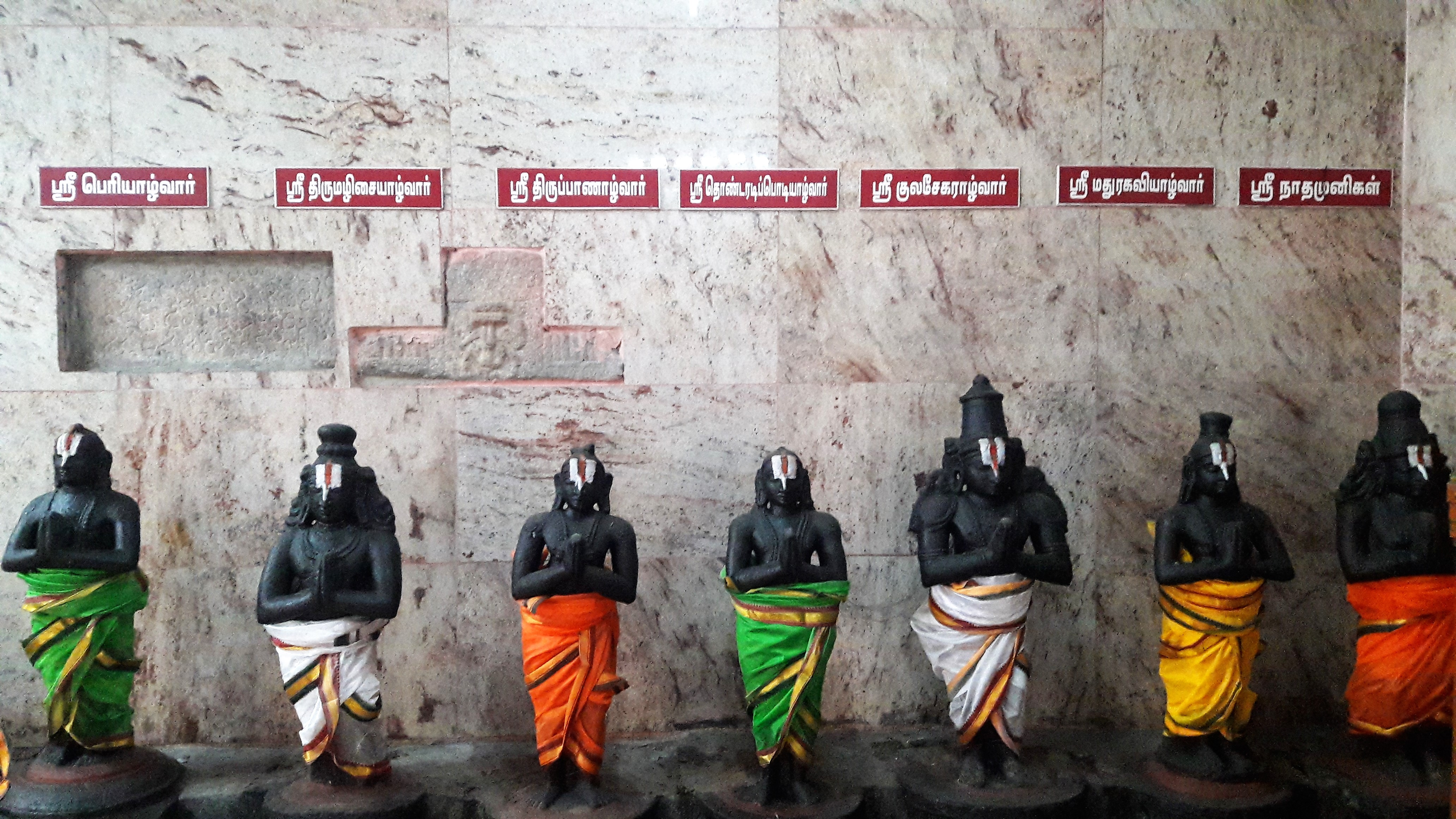
Murtis of the Alvars inside the temple

The temple is revered in the Naalayira Divya Prabandham, the 7th–9th century Vaishnava canon, by Bhoothath Alvar in one hymns and Thirumangai Alvar in four hymns. The temple is classified as a Divya Desam, one of the 108 Vishnu temples that are mentioned in the book. Some of the ancient Sanskrit books consider the temple as a uthamakshetram, meaning the place that gives the best to its devotees. Divyakavi Pillai Perumal Iyengar has also eulogized the presiding deity in one of his verses.

The temple finds mention in the eighth chapter of Brahmanda Purana that deals with the story of king Puroora Chakravarthy.

== Festivals ==
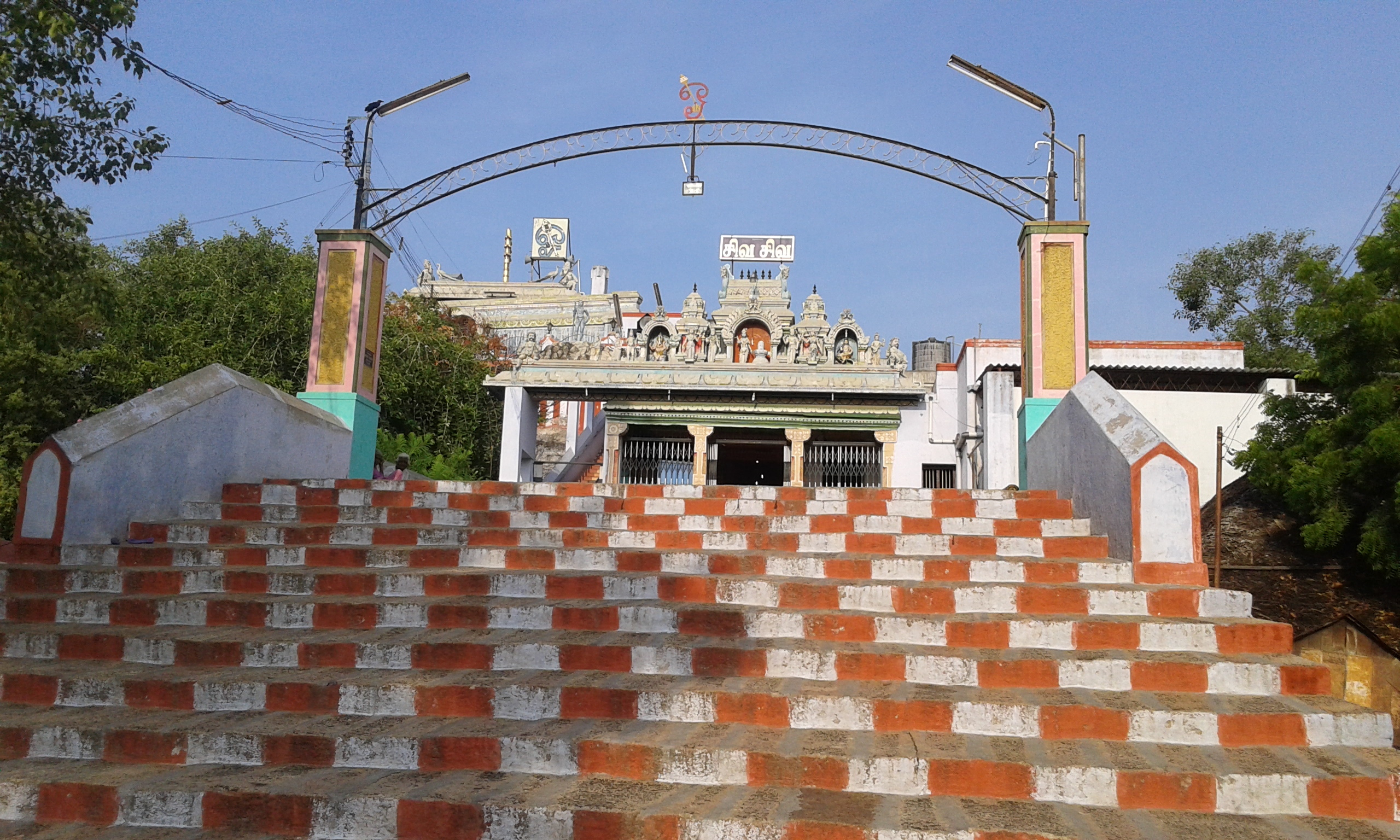
The entrance of the temple from the Subramaniyar temple

During Chitra Pournami, the festival image has a dip in Arujan river, decorated and mounted on a horse mount and taken around ten villages around Thiruthangal. On the fifth day of Adi Pooram, the festival image of the image is brought in Garuda mount and taken to Srivilliputhur Divya Desam along with four other temples.
