= Sivakasi railway station =

Railway station in Tamil Nadu, India

Sivakasi
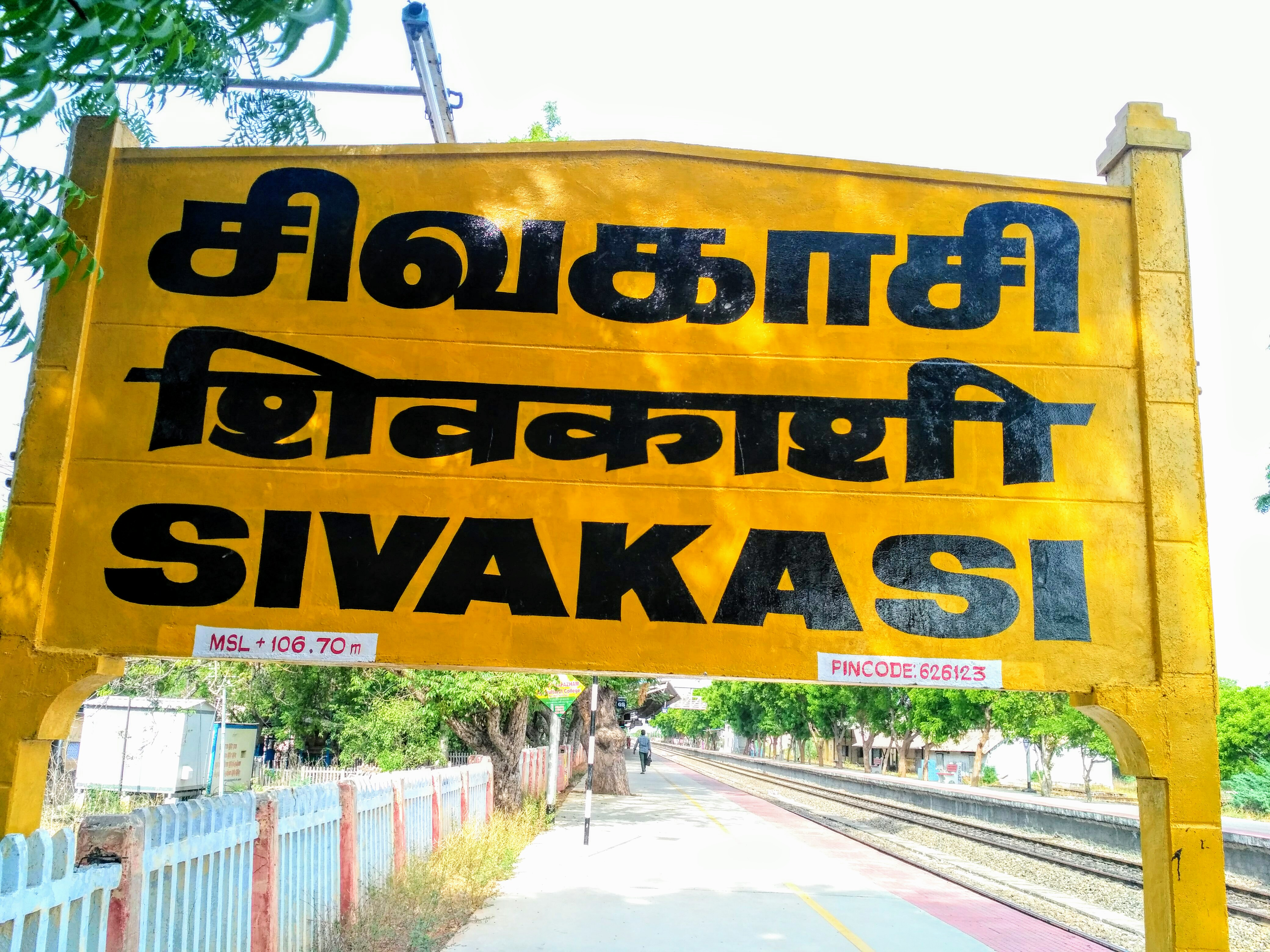

General information
- Location: Sivakasi, Virudhunagar District, Tamil Nadu; India
- Coordinates: 9.4633°N 77.7888°E
- Elevation: 111 metres (364 ft)
- System: Regional rail & Light rail station
- Owner: Indian Railways
- Operator: Southern Railway zone
- Line: Virudunagar–Tenkasi
- Platforms: 3
- Tracks: 3
- Connections: Taxicab stand, Auto rickshaw stand

Construction
- Structure type: Standard (on ground station)
- Parking: Yes

Other information
- Status: Functioning
- Station code: SVKS
- Zone(s): Southern Railway zone
- Division(s): MDU

History
- Opened: 1927;99 years ago
- Closed: 2000;26 years ago
- Rebuilt: 2003;23 years ago

Passengers
- 2022–23: 438,850 (per year); 1,202 (per day)
Route map
Location
- Location within India Location within Tamil Nadu

Sivakasi railway station (station code: SVKS) is an NSG–5 category Indian railway station in Madurai railway division of Southern Railway zone. It serves Sivakasi, located in Virudhunagar district of the Indian state of Tamil Nadu.

== Jurisdiction ==
It belongs to the Madurai railway division of the Southern Railway zone of Virudhunagar district in Tamil Nadu. The station code is SVKS.

== Line ==
The station falls on the line between Virudhunagar Junction and Tenkasi Junction

== Performance and earnings ==
For the FY 2022–23, the annual earnings of the station was ₹72,992,876 (US$760,000) and daily earnings was ₹199,980 (US$2,100). For the same financial year, the annual passenger count was 438,850 and daily count was 1,202. While, the footfall per day was recorded as 2,235.
