= Kuttalam railway station =

Railway station in Tamil Nadu, India

Kuttalam
- Kuttalam railway station name board

General information
- Location: Kuthalam, Mayiladuthurai district, Tamil Nadu; India
- Coordinates: 11.069965°N 79.557164°E
- Elevation: 19 metres (62 ft)
- System: Indian Railways station
- Owner: Indian Railways
- Operator: Southern Railway zone
- Line: Chennai Egmore–Thanjavur main line
- Platforms: 2
- Tracks: 2
- Connections: Auto rickshaw stand

Construction
- Structure type: Standard (on ground station)
- Parking: Available
- Accessible: Yes

Other information
- Status: Functioning
- Station code: KTM
- Zone(s): Southern Railway zone
- Division(s): Tiruchirappalli
- Fare zone: Indian Railways

History
- Opened: 15 February 1877
- Electrified: 28 January 2020
Location
- Location within Tamil Nadu Location within India

Kuttalam railway station (station code: KTM), alos spelles as Kuthalam or Kutralam, is a NSG–6 category railway station serving Kuthalam, a panchayat town in Mayiladuthurai district, Tamil Nadu, India. The station is part of the Southern Railway zone of Indian Railways and is administered by the Tiruchirappalli railway division. The station lies on the Chennai Egmore–Thanjavur main line.

== Location and layout ==
The railway station is located on the Mayiladuthurai to Kumbakonam road, and is about 0.35 km (0.22 mi) for the Kuthalam bus stop. The nearest airport is situated 124 km (77 mi) away at Tiruchirappalli.

== Lines ==
The station was opened on 15 February 1877 as part of the 70.42 km (43.76 mi) Mayiladuthurai – Thanjavur section on the Chennai Egmore–Thanjavur main line. It is situated between Mayiladuthurai and Kumbakonam railway stations.

The station has direct daily services to destinations including Villupuram, Chidambaram, Mayiladuthurai and Thanjavur railway stations.

== See also ==
- Navagraha temple
- Mayuranathaswami temple
- Poompuhar
- Uthavedeeswarar Temple
