= Thiruthangal =

Coordinates: 9°28′33″N 77°47′33″E

- neighbourhood
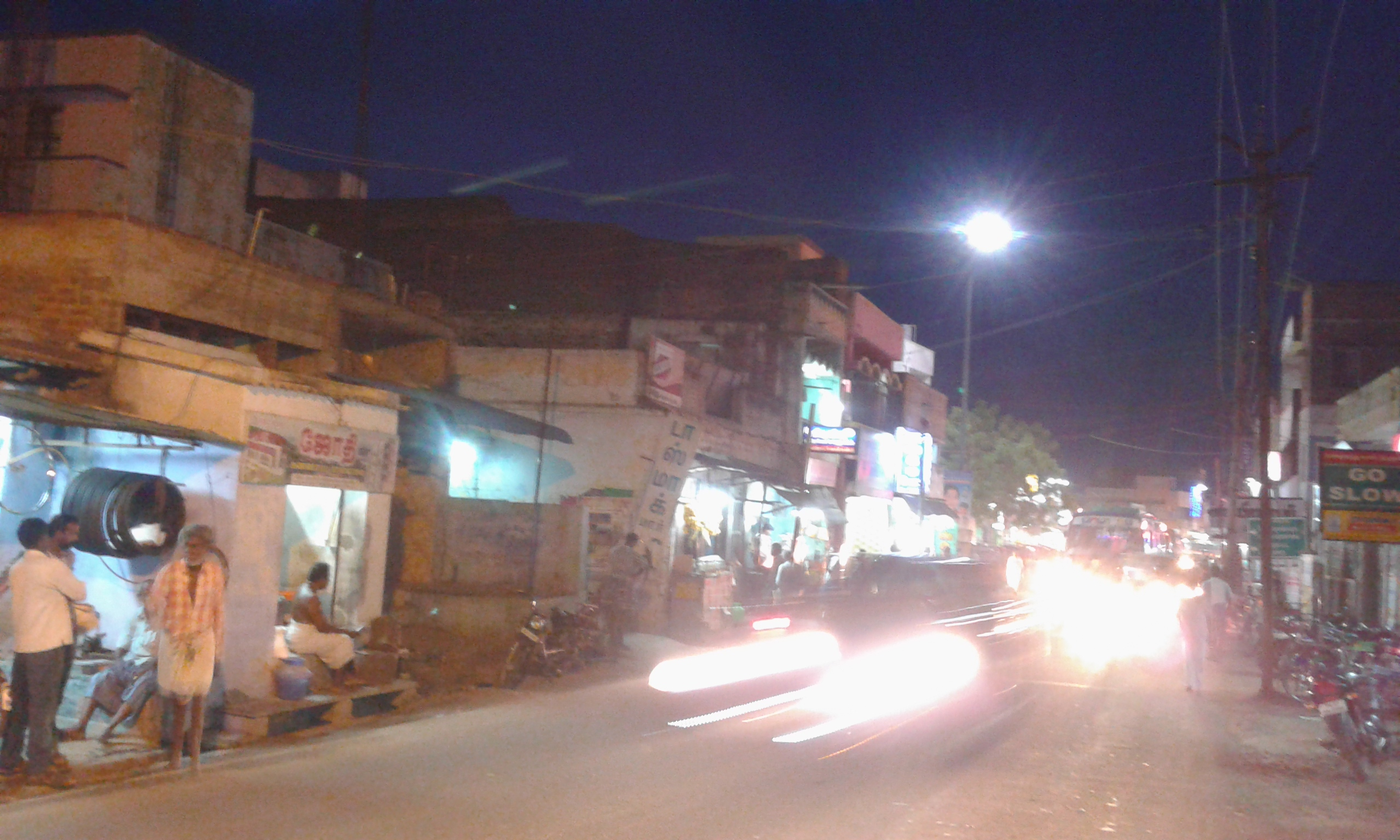
- Image of Thiruthanka city
- Interactive map of Thiruthangal
- Country: India
- State: Tamil Nadu
- District: Virudhunagar
- Revenue Division: Sivakasi
- Taluk: Sivakasi

Government
  - Type: Municipal Corporation
  - Body: Sivakasi City Municipal Corporation

Population (2011)
  - Total: 55,343

Languages
  - Official: Tamil
- Time zone: UTC+5:30 (IST)
- PIN: 626130
- Vehicle registration: TN95

Thiruthangal is a neighbourhood of Sivakasi City, India.Thiruthangal is one of the Zones of Sivakasi City Municipal Corporation. Ninra Narayana Perumal temple, one among the 108 Divya Desams, Vishnu temples revered by saint poets, Alwars of 6th–9th century is located in Thiruthangal. The place is also famous for Karunellinathar temple, located adjacent to Nindra Narayana Temple.

Thiruthangal is 2 kilometres far from the heart of Sivakasi city which is known for its printing, match-works and fireworks industries. Thiruthangal is well connected by bus and train and can be reached by air via Madurai. As of 2011, the town had a population of 55,362.Thiruthangal got integrated with Sivakasi on 31 December 2020.

== Demographics ==
Religious census
Religion	Percent(%)
Hindu	92.74%
Muslim	1.03%
Christian	6.14%
Sikh	0.01%
Other	0.08%

According to 2011 census, Thiruthangal had a population of 55,343 with a sex-ratio of 1,000 females for every 1,000 males, much above the national average of 929. A total of 5,918 were under the age of six, constituting 3,046 males and 2,872 females. Scheduled Castes and Scheduled Tribes accounted for 20.89% and .19% of the population respectively. The average literacy of the town was 71.89%, compared to the national average of 72.99%. The town had a total of 15424 households. There were a total of 27,159 workers, comprising 59 cultivators, 226 main agricultural labourers, 1,284 in house hold industries, 23,722 other workers, 1,868 marginal workers, 6 marginal cultivators, 22 marginal agricultural labourers, 117 marginal workers in household industries and 1,723 other marginal workers.

As per the religious census of 2011, Thiruthangal had 92.74% Hindus, 1.03% Muslims, 6.14% Christians, 0.01% Sikhs, and 0.08% following other religions.

== Economy ==
Thiruthangal is once a part of Sivakasi among the largest exporter of firecrackers all over the country and abroad. Prime Minister Jawaharlal Nehru called "Kutti Japan.". It also has granite quarries, namely Standard Granites and PRP Granites.

== Transport ==
The town has mono track broad gauge railway station. It will connect Chennai and Sengottai.

== Adjacent communities ==
Thiruthangal is the hub for many villages surrounding it like Sukkiravarapatti, Sillayanaickenpatti, Alamarathupatti, Naranapuram, Sengamalapatti, Velliapuram, Anaikutam, Vadamallapuram, Erichanatham, M Pudupatti etc.
