= Amrit Bharat =

Amrit Bharat may refer to:

- Amrit Bharat Express, Indian train service
- Amrit Bharat (trainset), Indian push-pull train.
- Amrit Bharat Station Scheme, Indian railway station renovation project
- Amrita Bharati, Indian playback singer
