= Rajapalayam railway station =

Railway station in Tamil Nadu, India

Rajapalayam
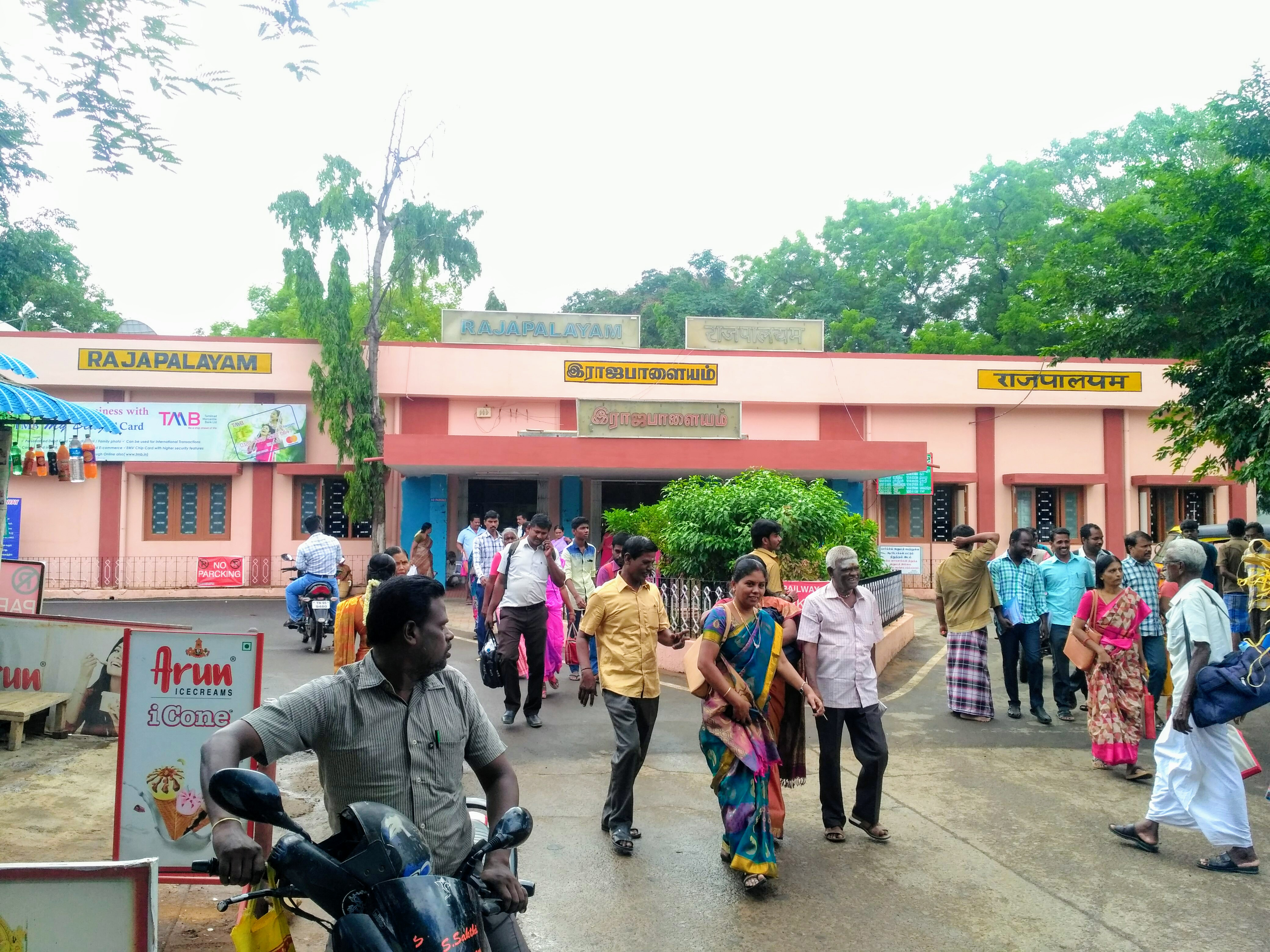

General information
- Location: Railway Feeder Road, Rajapalayam, Virudhunagar district, Tamil Nadu, Pincode-626117. India
- Coordinates: 9.4522°N 77.5604°E
- Elevation: 180 m (590 ft)
- System: Express train and Passenger train station
- Owner: Indian Railways
- Operator: Southern Railway zone
- Line: Virudhunagar Junction - Tenkasi Junction
- Platforms: 3
- Tracks: 3
- Connections: Bus stand, taxicab stand, auto rickshaw stand

Construction
- Structure type: Standard (on-ground station)
- Parking: Yes

Other information
- Status: Functioning
- Station code: RJPM
- Zone(s): Southern Railway zone
- Division(s): Madurai

History
- Opened: 1927; 99 years ago
- Rebuilt: 2003; 23 years ago

Passengers
- 2022–23: 605,484 (per year); 1,659 (per day)
Route map
Location
- Location within Tamil Nadu Location within India

Rajapalayam railway station (station code: RJPM) is an NSG–4 category Indian railway station in Madurai railway division of Southern Railway zone. It serves Rajapalayam, located in Virudhunagar district of the Indian state of Tamil Nadu. This station was commissioned on 30 June 1927.

== Development ==
It is one of the 73 stations in Tamil Nadu to be named for upgradation under Amrit Bharat Station Scheme of Indian Railways.

== Performance and earnings ==
For the FY 2022–23, the annual earnings of the station was ₹98,300,545 (US$1.0 million) and daily earnings was ₹269,317 (US$2,800). For the same financial year, the annual passenger count was 605,484 and daily count was 1,659. While, the footfall per day was recorded as 3,114.

== Lines ==
The station is part of the line that connects Chennai with places like Madurai, Tiruchirapalli.

- BG single line towards North Madurai via Virudhunagar.
- BG single line towards West Kollam via Tenkasi
