= Tenkasi Junction railway station =

Railway station in Tamil Nadu, India

Tenkasi Junction
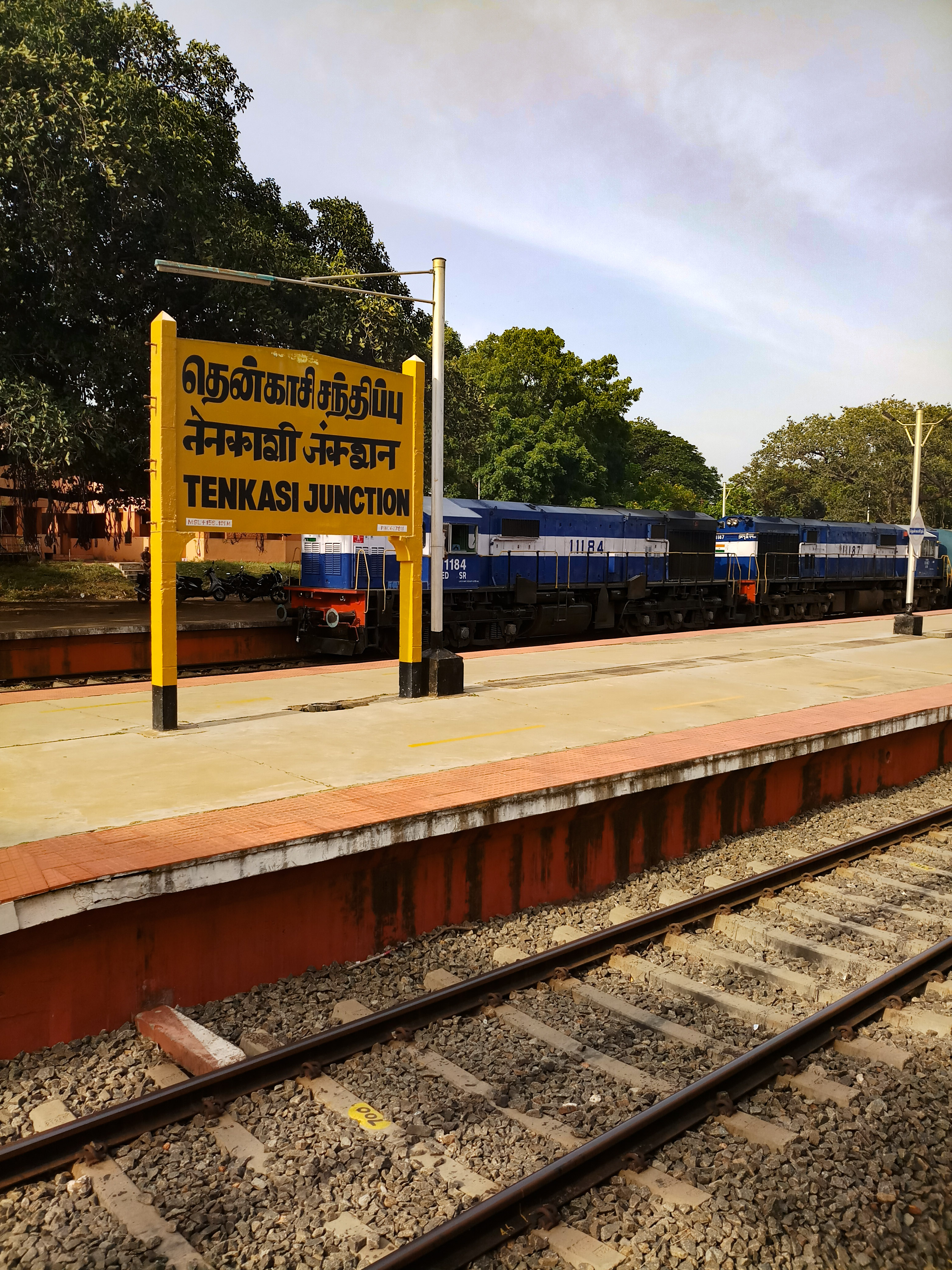
- Tenkasi Junction board

General information
- Location: Railway feeder road, Tenkasi, Tenkasi district, Tamil Nadu; India
- Coordinates: 8.9641°N 77.3053°E
- Elevation: 158 metres (518 ft)
- System: Indian Railways station
- Owner: Indian Railways
- Operator: Southern Railway zone
- Lines: Tenkasi–Virudhunagar; Tenkasi–Tirunelveli; Tenkasi-Kollam
- Platforms: 4
- Tracks: 4
- Connections: Bus stand, taxicab stand, auto rickshaw stand

Construction
- Structure type: Standard (on-ground station)
- Parking: Yes

Other information
- Status: Functioning
- Station code: TSI
- Zone(s): Southern Railway zone
- Division(s): Madurai

History
- Opened: 1903
- Rebuilt: 2023 (on going Amrit Bharat)
- Electrified: 2023

Passengers
- 2024–25: 31,02,500 (per year); 8,500 (per day)
- Rank: 4th (in Madurai division)
Route map
Location
- Location within Tamil Nadu Location within India

Tenkasi Junction railway station (station code: TSI) is an NSG–3 category Indian railway station in Madurai railway division of Southern Railway zone. It is a junction railway station serving the city of Tenkasi in the Indian state of Tamil Nadu. The station is a part of the Madurai railway division of the Southern Railway zone. It is the junction point for Virudhunagar and Tirunelveli rail routes.

== Location and layout ==
The railway station is located in the Railway feeder road of Tenkasi. The nearest bus depot is located in Tenkasi New Bus stand while the nearest airport is situated 72 kilometres (45 mi) away in Thiruvananthapuram.

== Lines ==
The station is a focal point of the historic line that connects Chennai with Madurai Junction and Tiruchirappalli Junction. An additional line branches out east-bound to Tirunelveli Junction via Ambasamudram.

The lines branching out from Tenkasi Junction are:

- BG single line towards north – Virudhunagar Junction via Rajapalayam, Sivakasi
- BG single line towards east – Tirunelveli Junction via Ambasamudram.
- BG single line towards west – Kollam Junction via Punalur.

== Projects and development ==
It is one of the 73 stations in Tamil Nadu to be named for upgradation under Amrit Bharat Station Scheme of Indian Railways.

7.08 crore rupees have been allocated for the renovation work of Tenkasi railway station under the Amrit Bharat scheme.

== Performance and earnings ==
For the FY 2022–23, the annual earnings of the station was ₹201,156,578 (US$2.1 million) and daily earnings was ₹551,114 (US$5,700). For the same financial year, the annual passenger count was 1,080,204 and daily count was 2,959. While, the footfall per day was recorded as 6,572.
