= Virudhunagar Junction railway station =

Railway station in Tamil Nadu, India

Virudhunagar Junction Virudhunagar Sandhippu
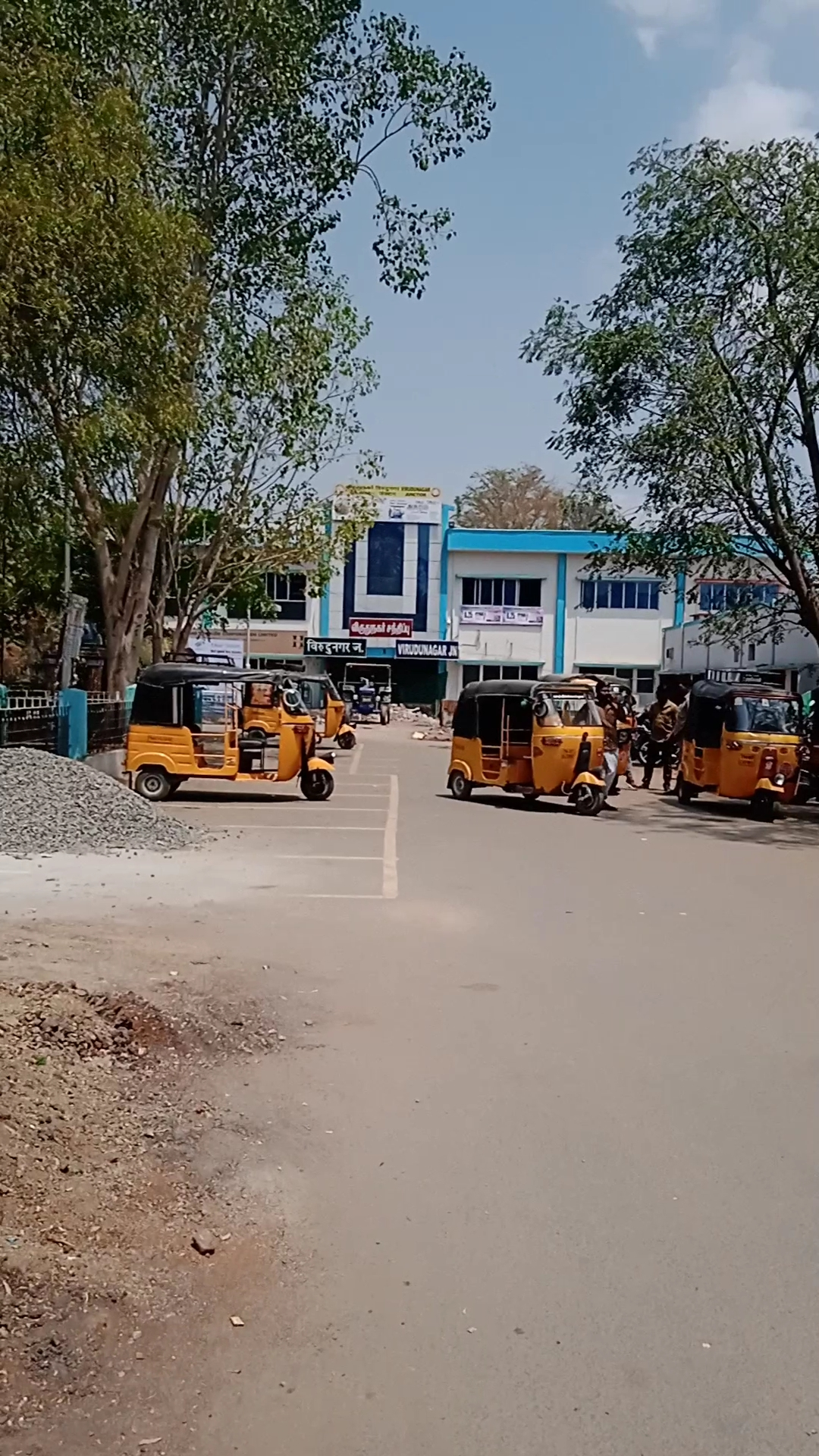
- The Main Entrance to the Virudhunagar Junction

General information
- Location: Railway Feeder Rd, Virudhunagar Virudhunagar district, Tamil Nadu; India
- Coordinates: 9.5947701°N 77.9572194°E
- Elevation: 101 metres (331 ft)
- Owner: Indian Railways
- Operator: Southern Railway zone
- Platforms: 4
- Tracks: 7
- Connections: Bus, taxi, auto rickshaw

Construction
- Structure type: Standard (on-ground station)
- Parking: Yes

Other information
- Status: Active
- Station code: VPT
- Zone(s): Southern Railway zone
- Division(s): Madurai
- Fare zone: Indian Railways

Passengers
- 2022–23: 1,338,063 (per year); 3,666 (per day)
Route map
Location
- Location within Tamil Nadu Location within India

Virudhunagar Junction railway station (station code: VPT) is an NSG–3 category Indian railway station in Madurai railway division of Southern Railway zone. It serves the town of Virudhunagar, located in Virudhunagar district of the Indian state of Tamil Nadu. It is being developed under Amrit Bharat Station Scheme.

== Location and layout ==
The Virudhunagar Junction is located on the North Eastern side of the city adjacent to the town's SIDCO industrial estate. The station bears the intersection of four branching railway lines. The next nearest train stations are:

Direction	Towards	Distance
North	Kalligudi	11 km
South	Tulukapati	15 km
West	Tiruttangal	21 km
North-East	Aruppukkottai	21 km

== Railway lines ==
S.No.	Direction	Towards	Line
1	North	Madurai Junction	Double Electrified
2	South hKRZWae ~~ 17.5 ~~ Arjuna River BHF ~~ 27.5 ~~ Satur hKRZWae ~~ 28.5 ~~ Vaippar River HST ~~ 37.5 ~~ Nalli BHF ~~ 49.1 ~~ Kovilpatti HST ~~ 71.5 ~~ Kadambur	Vanchi Maniyachchi Junction	Double Electrified
3	West	Tenkasi Junction	Single Electrified
4	North-East	Manamadurai Junction	Single Electrified

== Projects and development ==
It is one of the 73 stations in Tamil Nadu to be named for upgradation under Amrit Bharat Station Scheme of Indian Railways.

== Performance and earnings ==
For the FY 2022–23, the annual earnings of the station was ₹266,233,935 (US$2.8 million) and daily earnings was ₹729,408 (US$7,600). For the same financial year, the annual passenger count was 1,338,063 and daily count was 3,666. While, the footfall per day was recorded as 6,802.

== Train ==
More than 120 train passes through Virudhunagar jn. 2 minutes halt provide for all train except Chennai - Nagercoil - Chennai Vande Bharat express. Virudunagar - Karaikkudi Express is the only originating & terminating train in Virudunagar jn. It commence service with innagural run on 7 September 2013

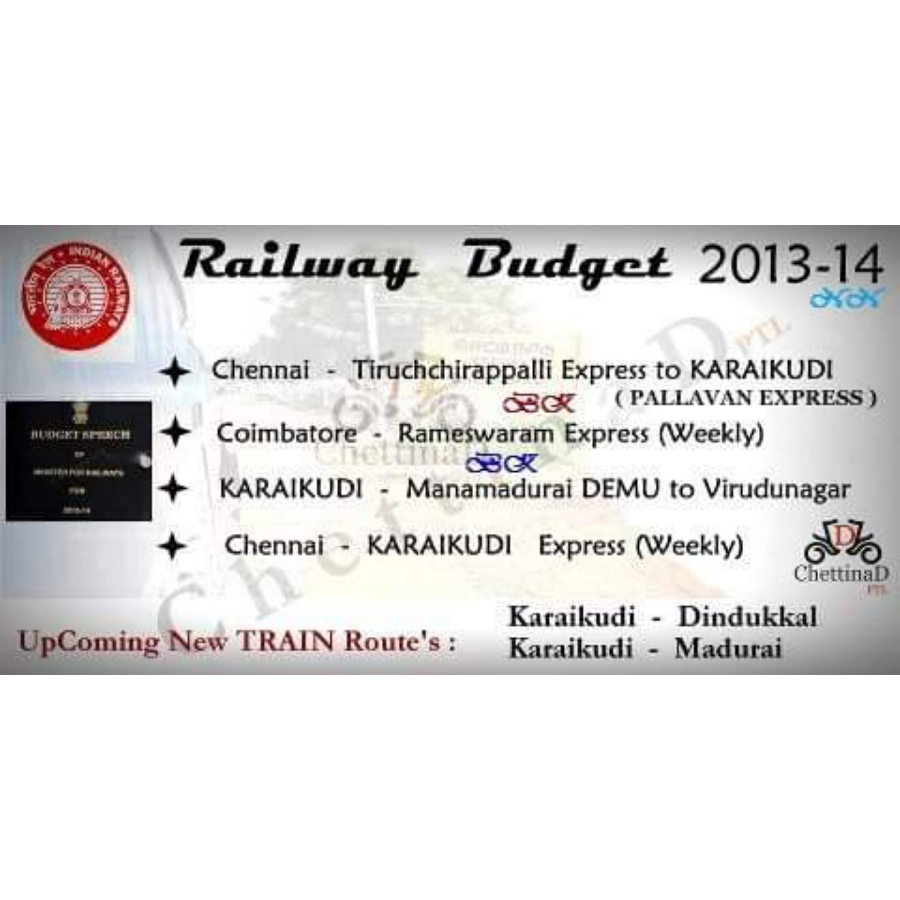
RAILWAY BUDGET 2013-14 SR VIRUDHUNAGAR DEMU – PALLAVAN EXTENSION

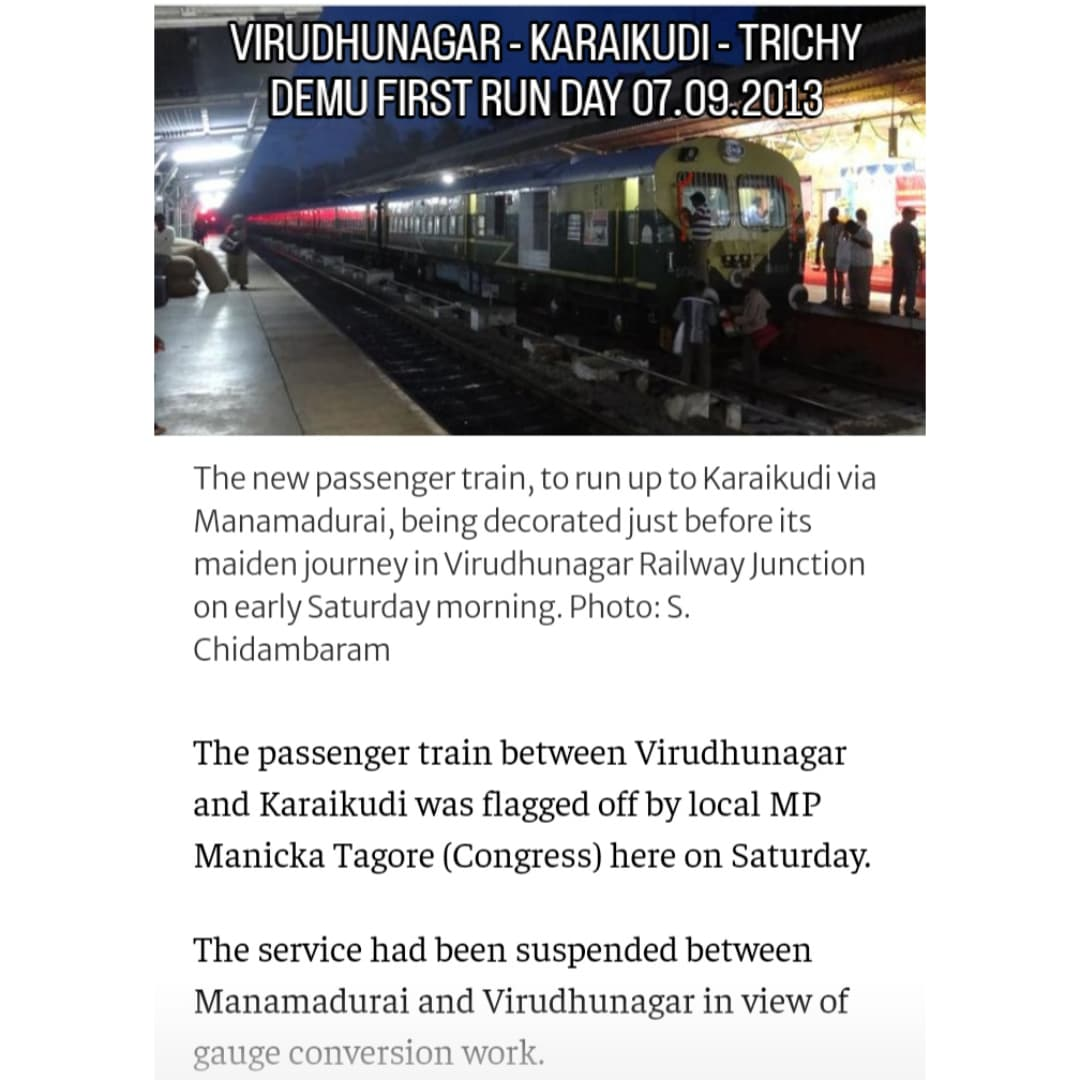
VIRUDHUNAGAR - KARAIKKUDI DEMU DECORATED FOR ITS INNAGURAL RUN

== Image Gallery ==
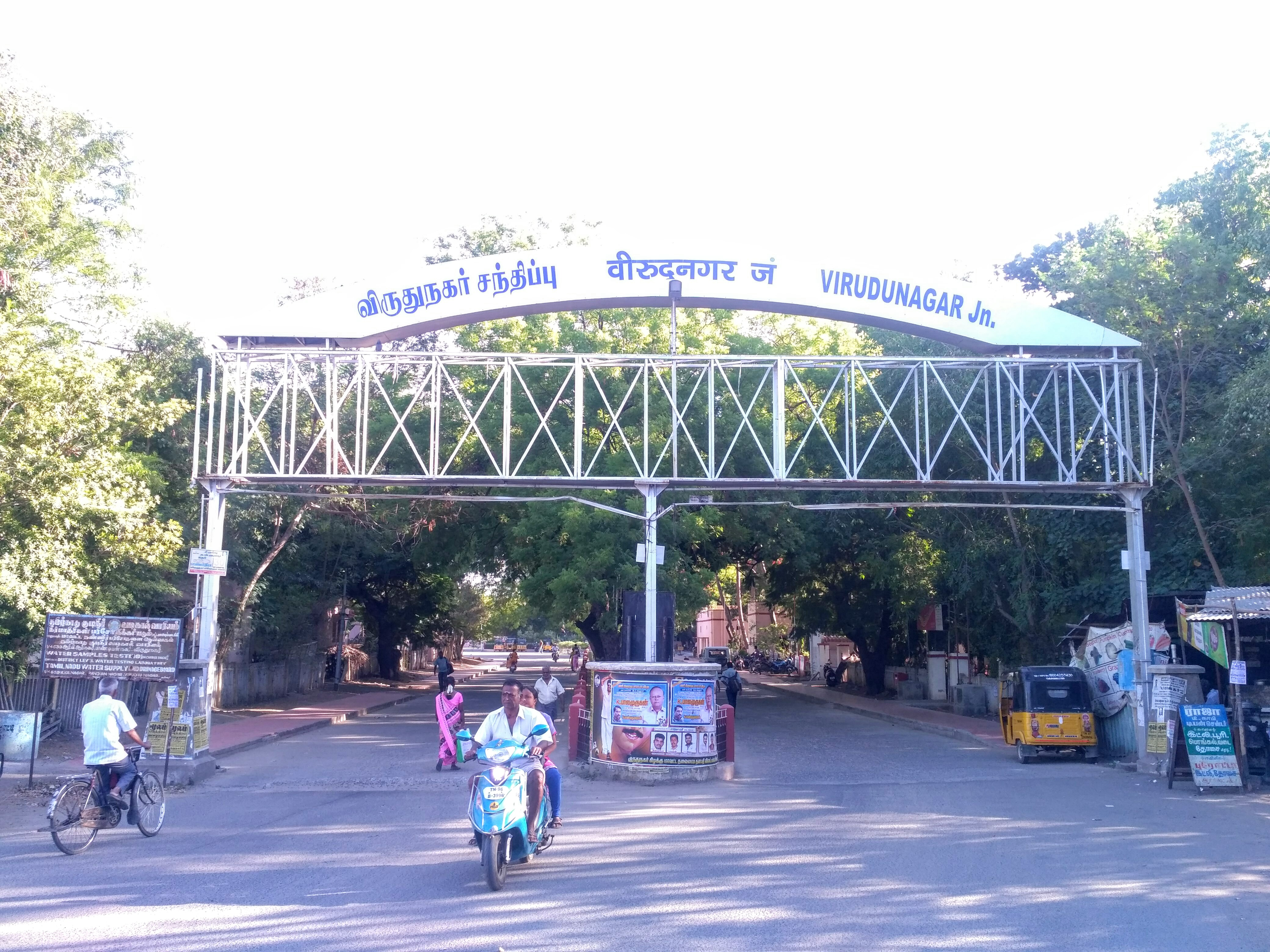
Virudhunagar jn. iconic Old Arch

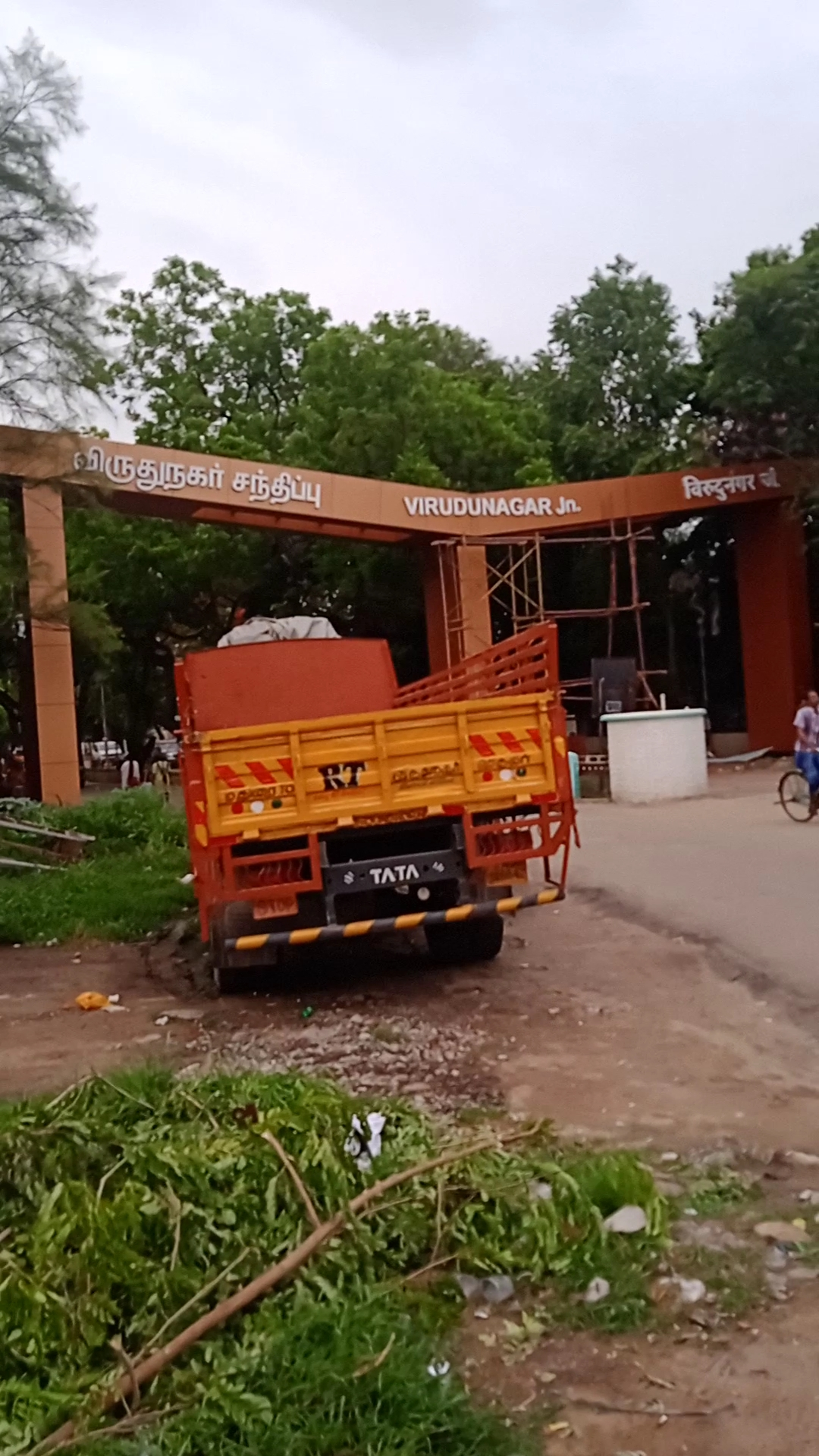
New Arch built under Amrit Bharat Station Scheme

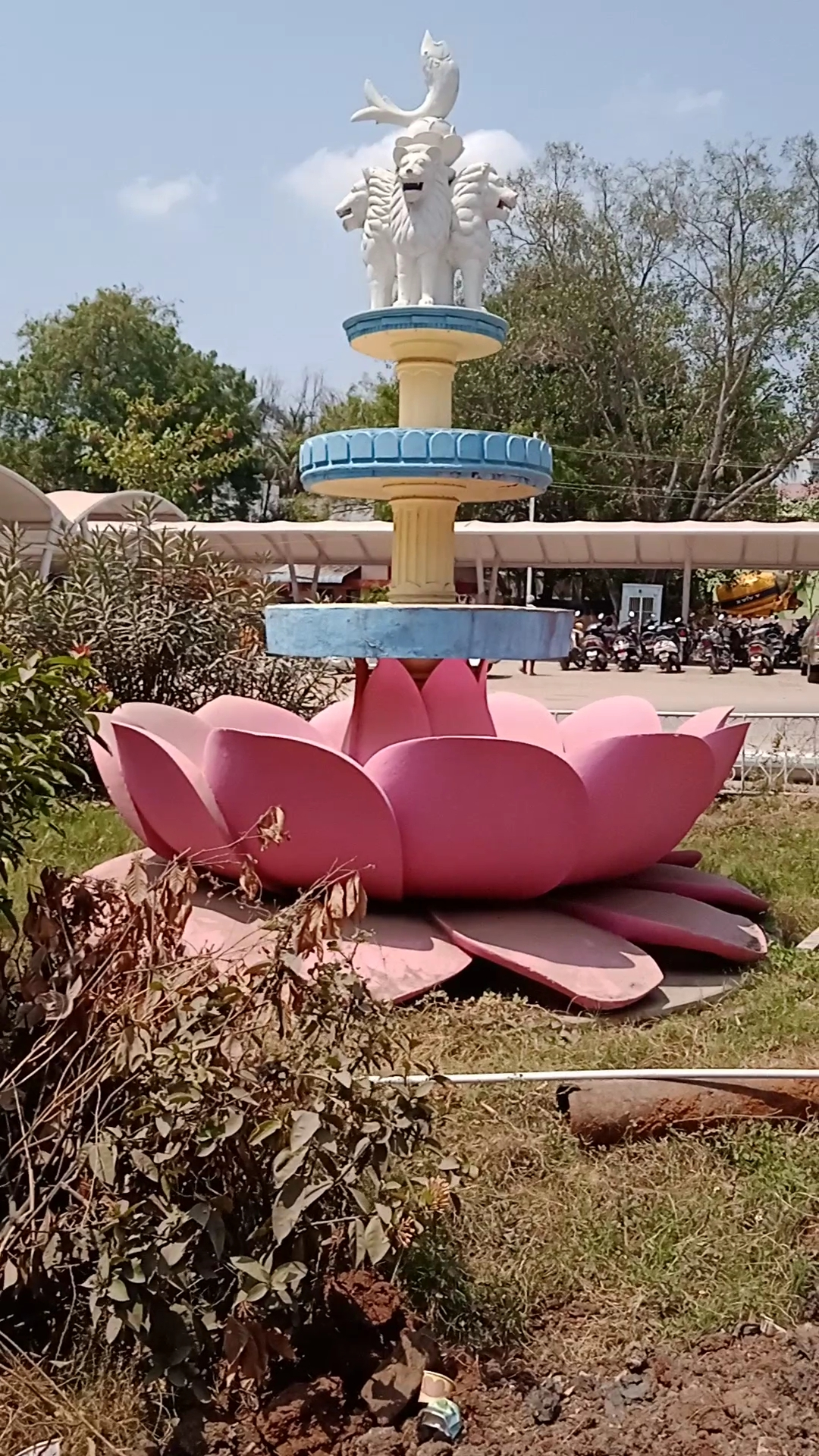
Fish over Four head lion on Lotus

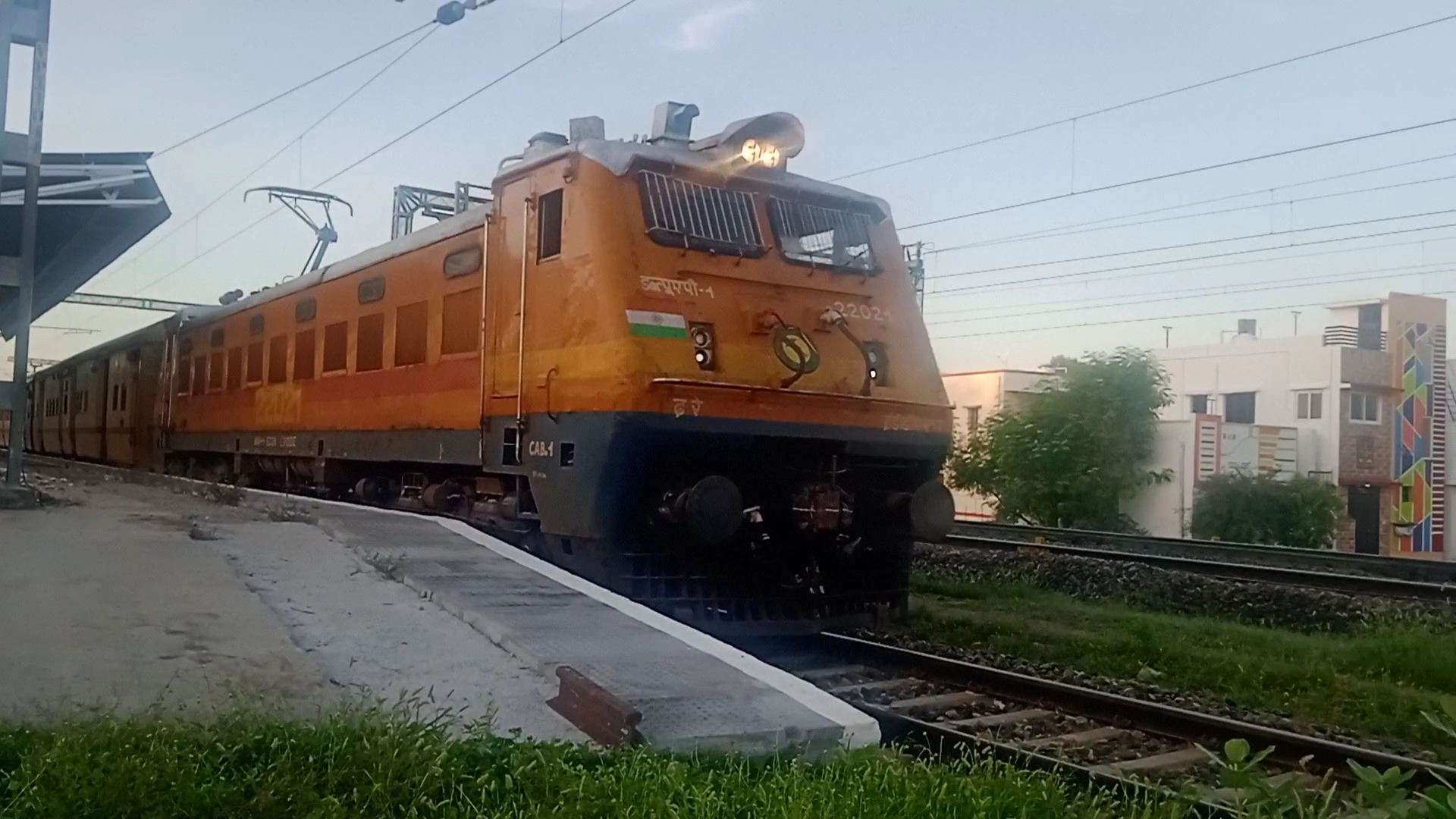
VIRUDHUNAGAR - KARAIKKUDI EXPRESS DEPART VIRUDUNAGAR JN. 2024 ICF

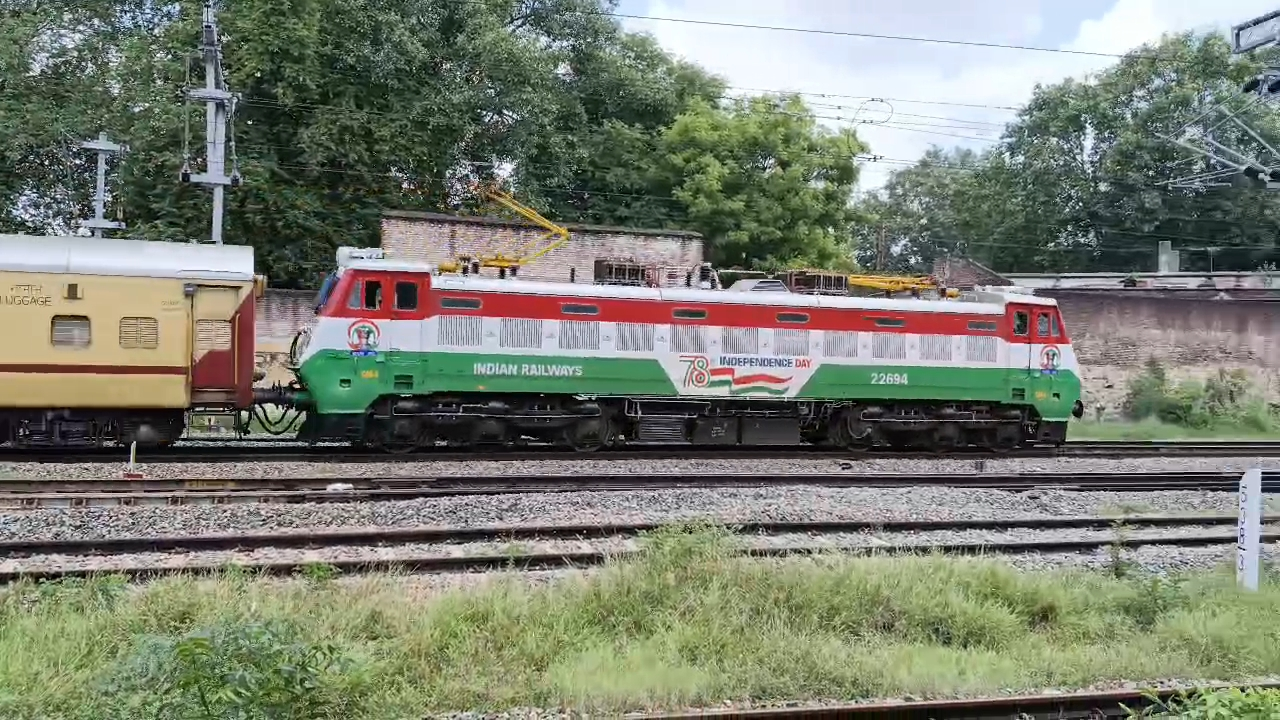
78 INDEPENDENCE LOCO GURUVAYUR - CHENNAI EXPRESS ARRIVE VIRUDUNAGAR JN.

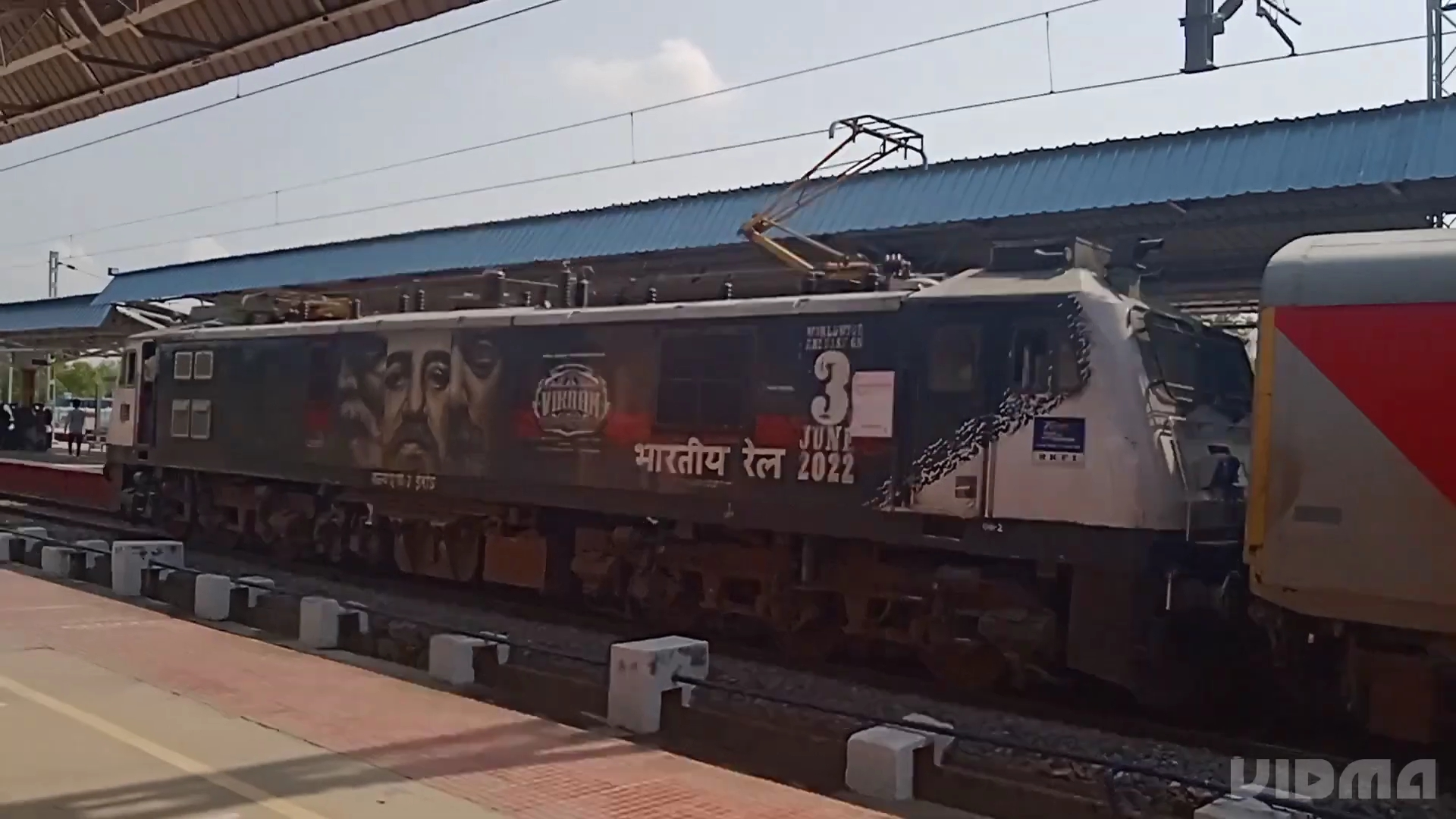
VIKRAM ADVERTISED WAP7 CAPE - HOWRAH EXPRESS VIRUDUNAGAR JN.

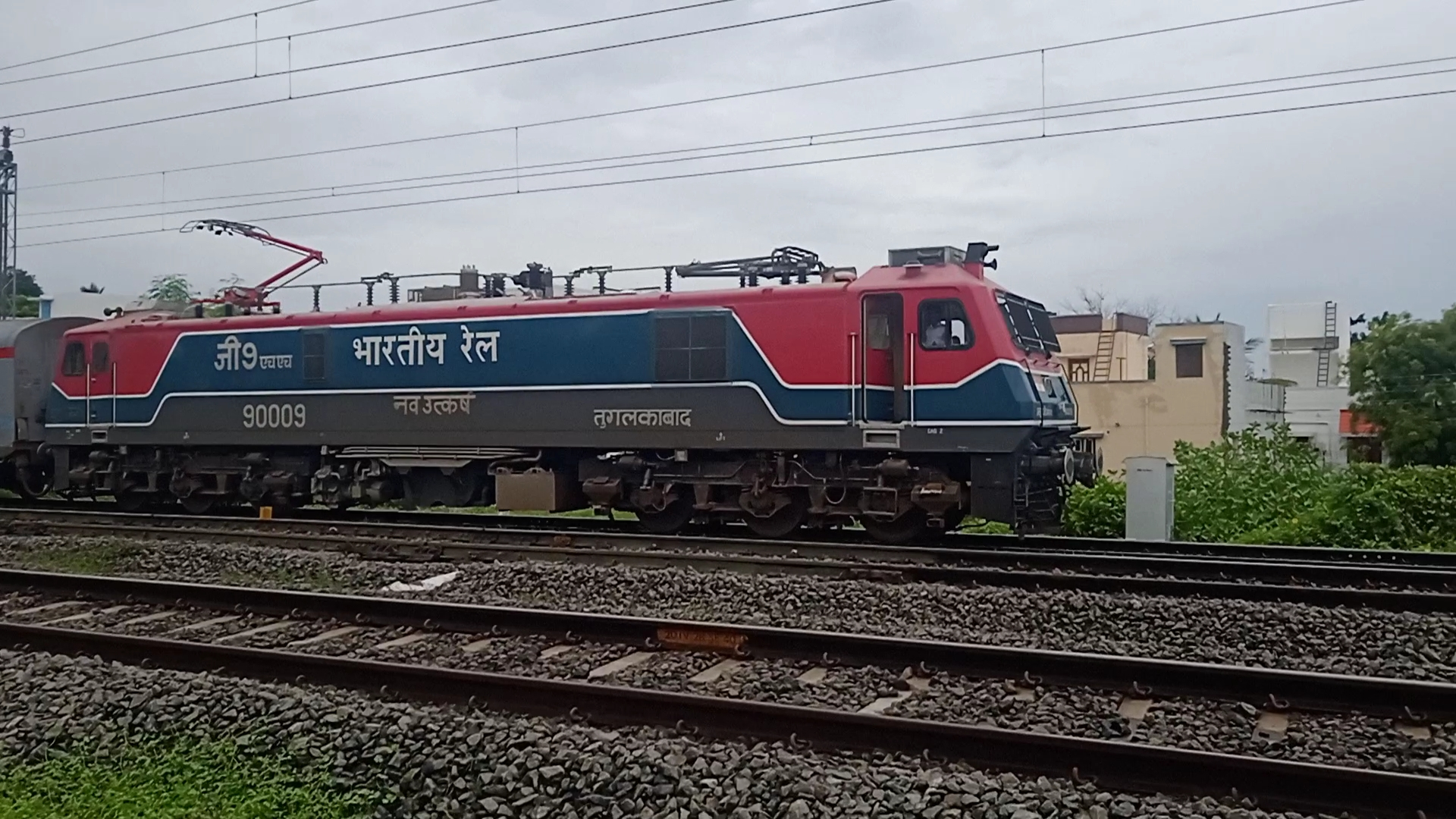
NAVA UTKARSH PULL BHARAT GAURAV EXPRESS VIRUDUNAGAR JN.

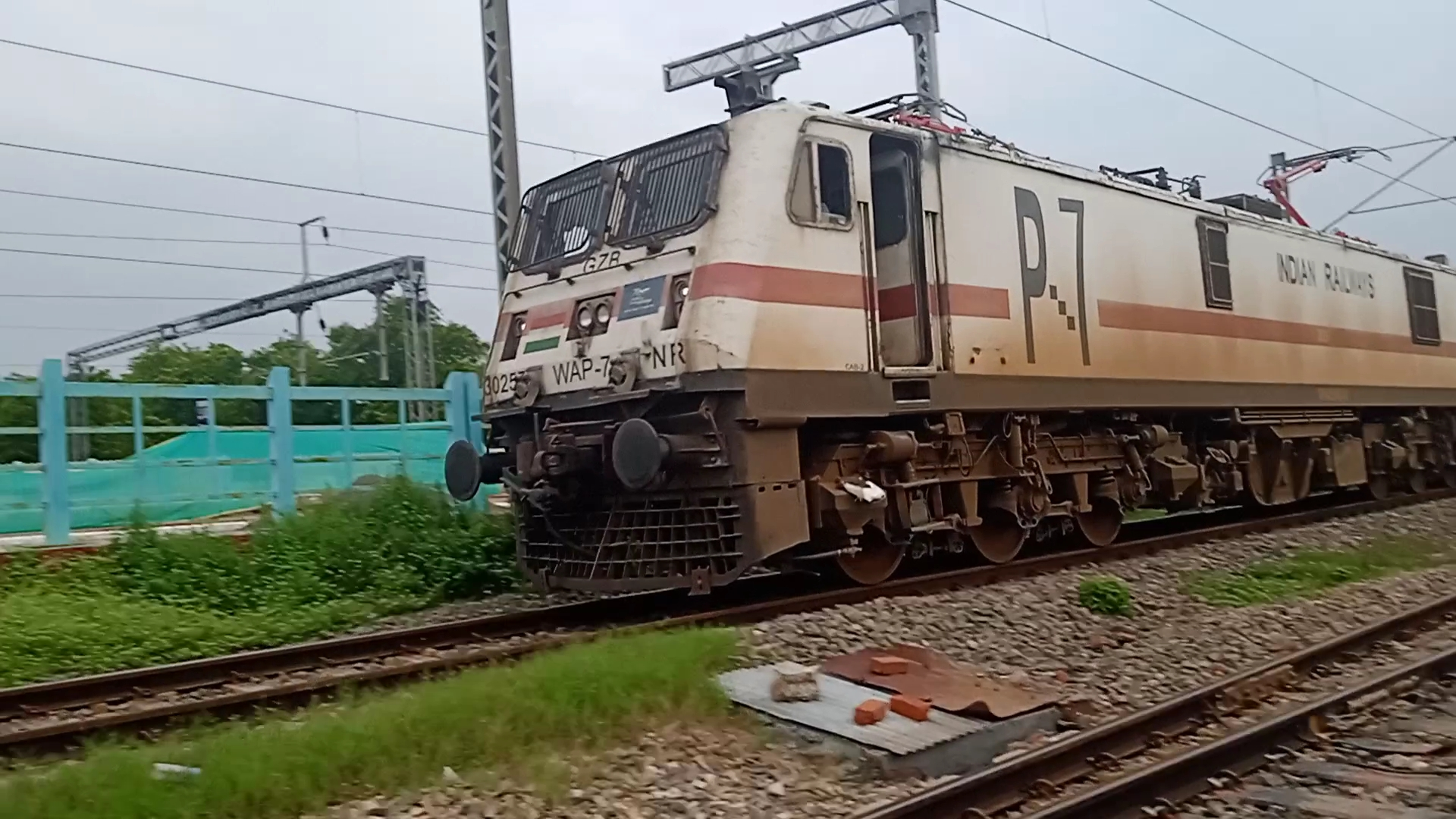
P7 DECAL WAP7 DADAR CHALUKYA EXPRESS DEPART VIRUDUNAGAR JN.

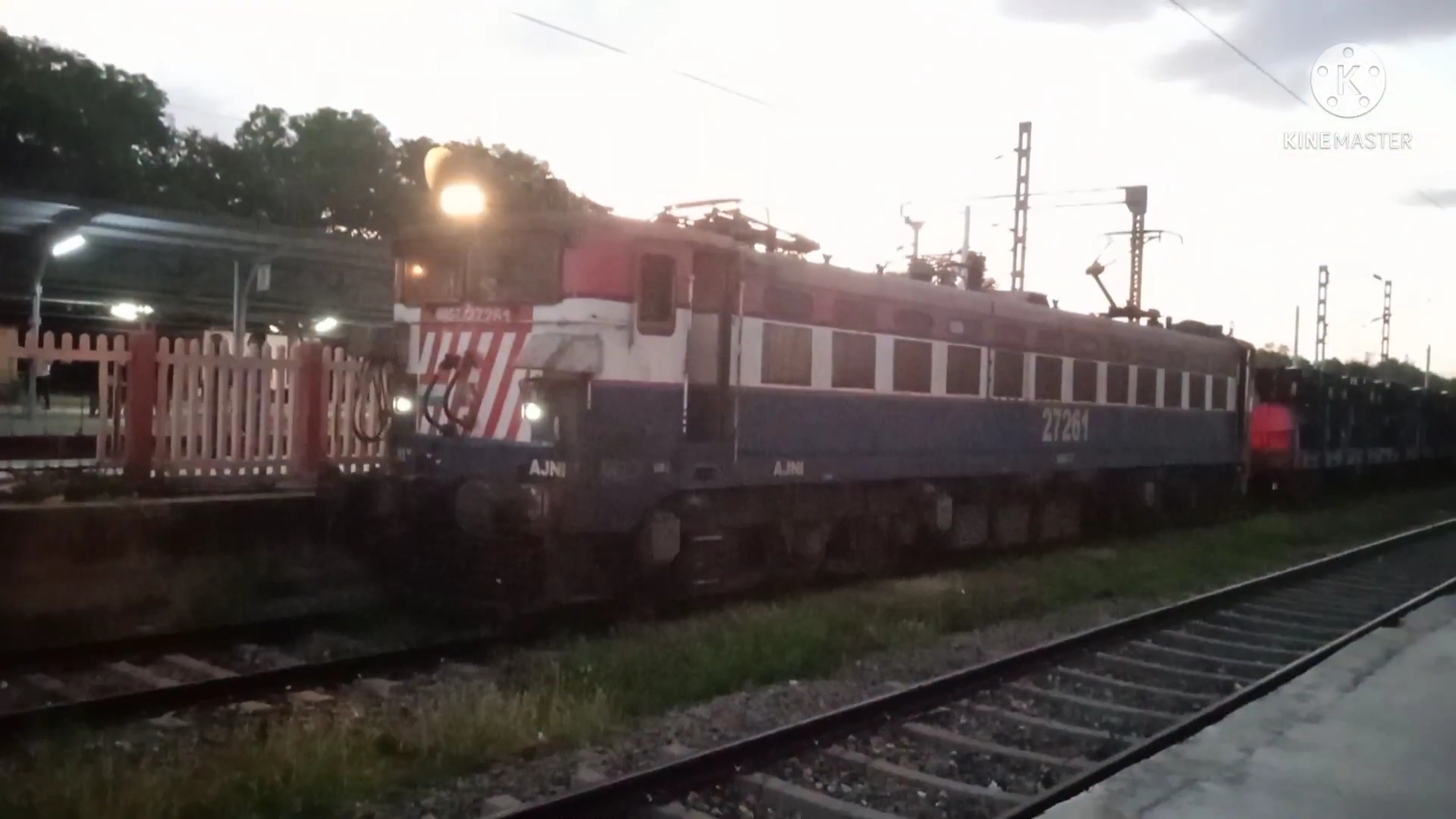
AJNI WAG7 VIRUDUNAGAR JN.
