= Kengeri =

Kengeri (red color)Kempada keri = Kengeri ( name has nothing to do with coconut as per Kannada grammar)
- Suburb
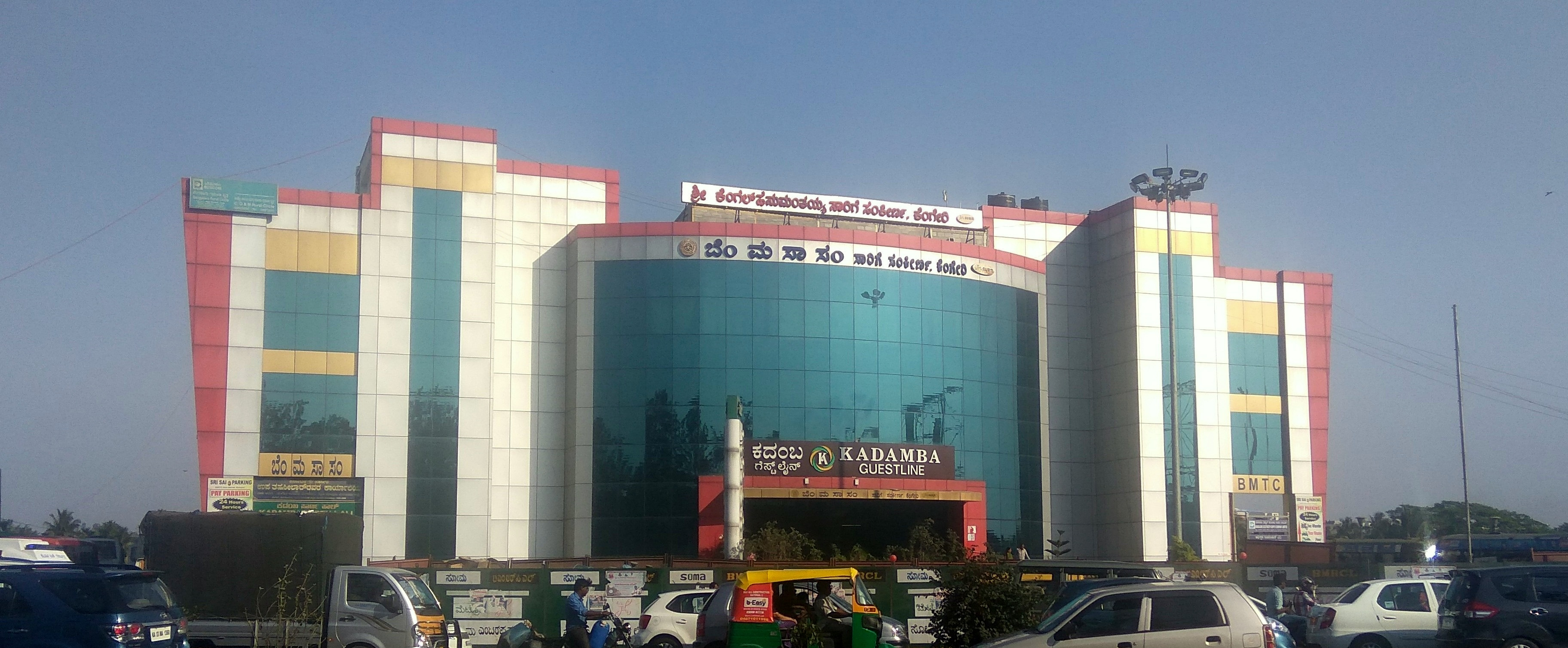
- Kengeri TTMC junction

- Location within Bengaluru
- Coordinates: 12.91°N 77.48°E
- Country: India
- State: Karnataka
- District: Bengaluru Urban
- Metro: Bangalore
- Elevation: 826 m (2,710 ft)

Population (2001)
  - Total: 42,389

Languages
  - Official: Kannada
- Time zone: UTC+5:30 (IST)
- PIN: 560059,560060
- Vehicle registration: KA 41

Kengeri is a western suburb of Bangalore city, located along Mysore Road.It is bordered by Nagarbhavi and Ullal to the north, Rajarajeshwari Nagar to the east, Kumbalgodu to the west and Uttarahalli to the south.

== History ==
The name Kengeri comes from the Kannada words Tengu coconut and Keri meaning place. The place has been ruled by a number of dynasties including Gangas, followed by Cholas. In 1050 AD, Chola king Rajendra Chola erected a Tamil inscription depicting details of grants made to Eshwara Temple at Kengeri. The provinces of Kengeri and surrounding areas came under the control of Kings of Kukkalanadu, who had Kithnahally near Tavarekere as the capital and ruled Nelamangala, Ramanagara, Bangalore South (Actually, parts of Kanakapura district which was part of Bangalore earlier and was considered Bangalore South) and Magadi taluks. After Hoysala ruler's regime, during the period of Vijayanagar Empire, Kengeri was vested with Yelahanka province administration. Later, when Maratha warrior Shahaji won Bangalore, Kengeri came under Shahaji's regime. During 1677 AD, King of Mysore Chikkadevaraja Wodeyar won Kengeri and was in the province of Mysore.

Tippu Sultan reportedly took shelter in Kengeri Fort while at war with the British. When the English captured Bangalore, the fort was reportedly destroyed to prevent its use. In the survey report prepared by Colonel McKenzie and Bakunin, after death of Tippu, there is mention about remains of Kengeri Fort. The area is now recognised as fort area (Kengeri kote/Kengeri fort).

During Tippu's reign, Kengeri was famous centre for sericulture industry. It is learnt that Tippu for the first time bought foreign knowledge of sericulture and encouraged people to cultivate and produce the same. In 1866, Signor de Vecchi, an Italian, noticing the then depressed condition of the silk industry made efforts with the help of the government for its revival. He also made some scientific study of silkworm rearing and causes for their degeneration. To remedy these defects, silkworm eggs were imported for the first time from Japan and were distributed among the people of the trade.

This brought about revolutionary changes. Finally, a steam factory for silk-filature was established at Kengeri with eight basins. Mostly female orphans from a private Bangalore convent were engaged in the work. The Kengeri Gurukula Vidya Peetha was founded in 1926 by freedom fighters and Gandhians like Dr C B Rama Rao, Swamy Vishwananda, T Ramachandra and K B Purushottam to motivate youngsters to do their bit for social causes.

When Mahatma Gandhi visited the Gurukula twice he guided the youngsters to visit villages and organise people to tackle socio-economic problems in these villages through collective efforts. A memorial building had been built at the premises to commemorate the visits of Mahatma Gandhi.

The Vidyapeetha, an NGO, runs an orphanage, a free residential school and a short-stay-home for underprivileged women hoping for early rehabilitation. In recent years, several industries have come up in and around Kengeri.

== Transport ==
=== Bus ===
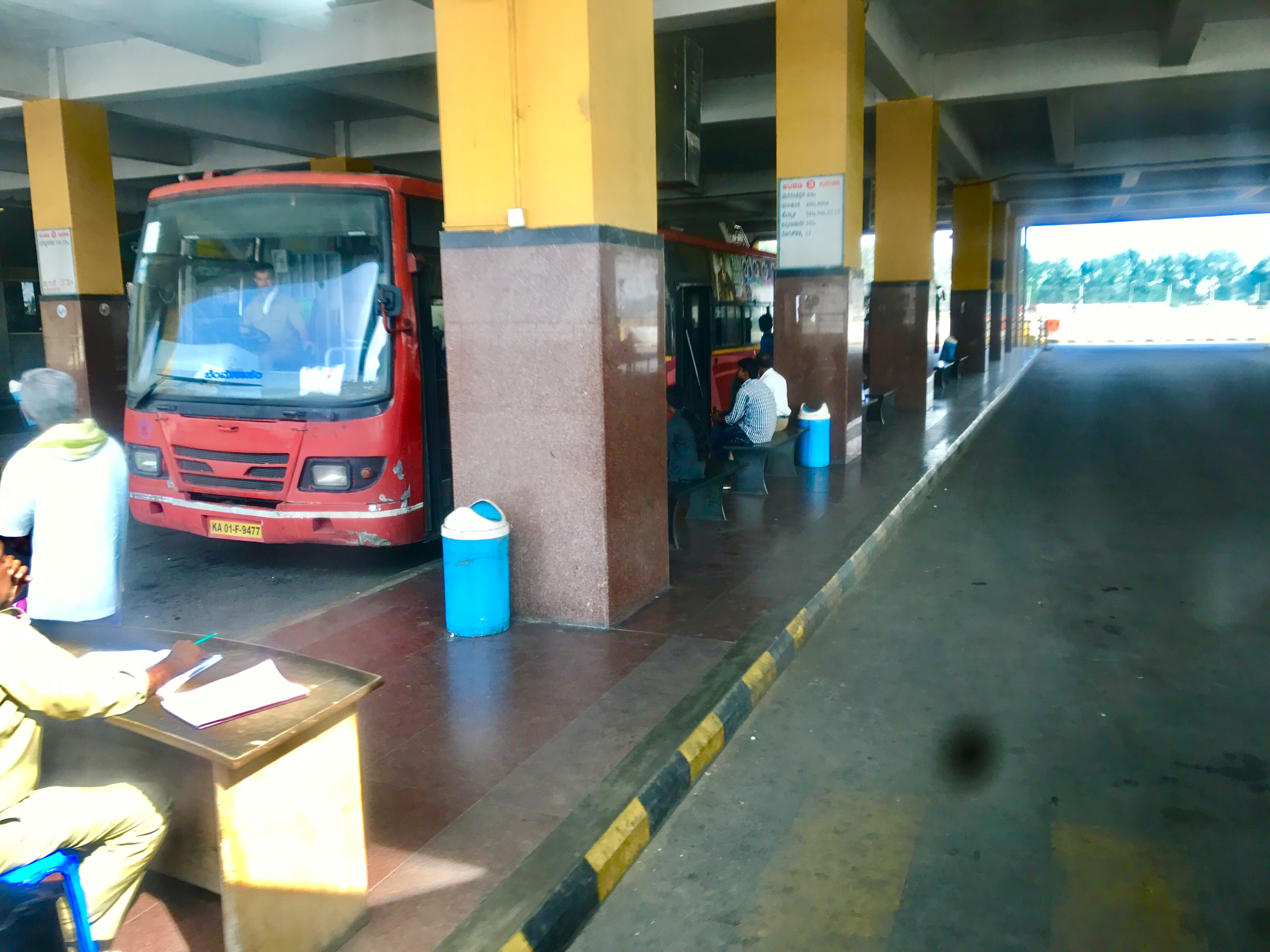
BMTC bus station in Kengeri TTMC

Kengeri has two Bangalore Metropolitan Transport Corporation (BMTC) depots: Depot-12 located near NICE Road junction and Depot-37 located within the Kengeri Traffic and Transit Management Centre (TTMC).

Many buses ply from Kengeri to different parts of the city including 375D towards Banashankari, 378 towards Electronic City, 401M and 401KB towards Yeshvantpur, 401K towards Yelahanka, 501A and 501C towards Hebbal, 502H towards Chikkabanavara, 502F towards Jalahalli Cross and G6 towards Shantinagar Bus Station. It also acts as an intermediate station for buses between Bidadi and Kempegowda Bus Station/K. R. Market. Many buses ply from Bidadi, Ramohalli, Hunnigere, Doddabelle, Gavinapalya, Gonipura, Byrohalli to KR Market and Kempegowda Bus Station (Majestic) through Kengeri Satellite Town Bus Terminal.

=== Rail ===
Kengeri railway station is on the Bangalore-Mysore rail route. Chamundi Express, Mysore-Bangalore Rajya Rani Express, Mysore-Tirupati Fast Passenger, Mysore-Chennai Kaveri (Cauvery) Express, Mysore - Myiladuthurai Express, Bangalore City–Karwar Express connecting Bangalore-Mysore, Bangalore-Mangalore and Tuticorin-Mysore Express are the main train connections. The computerised passenger reservation system is in service. The station is served by the South Western Railways.

Bangalore City Railway Station is to the north-east of Kengeri. Travelling south-west, Bidadi railway station is the nearest main station.

=== Metro ===
The suburb is served by Pattanagere metro station, Kengeri Bus Terminal metro station and Kengeri metro station of the Purple Line of Namma Metro.These stations were inaugurated on August 29, 2021, and commenced operations on August 30, 2021, improving the connectivity to the city.

== Satellite town and its infrastratures ==
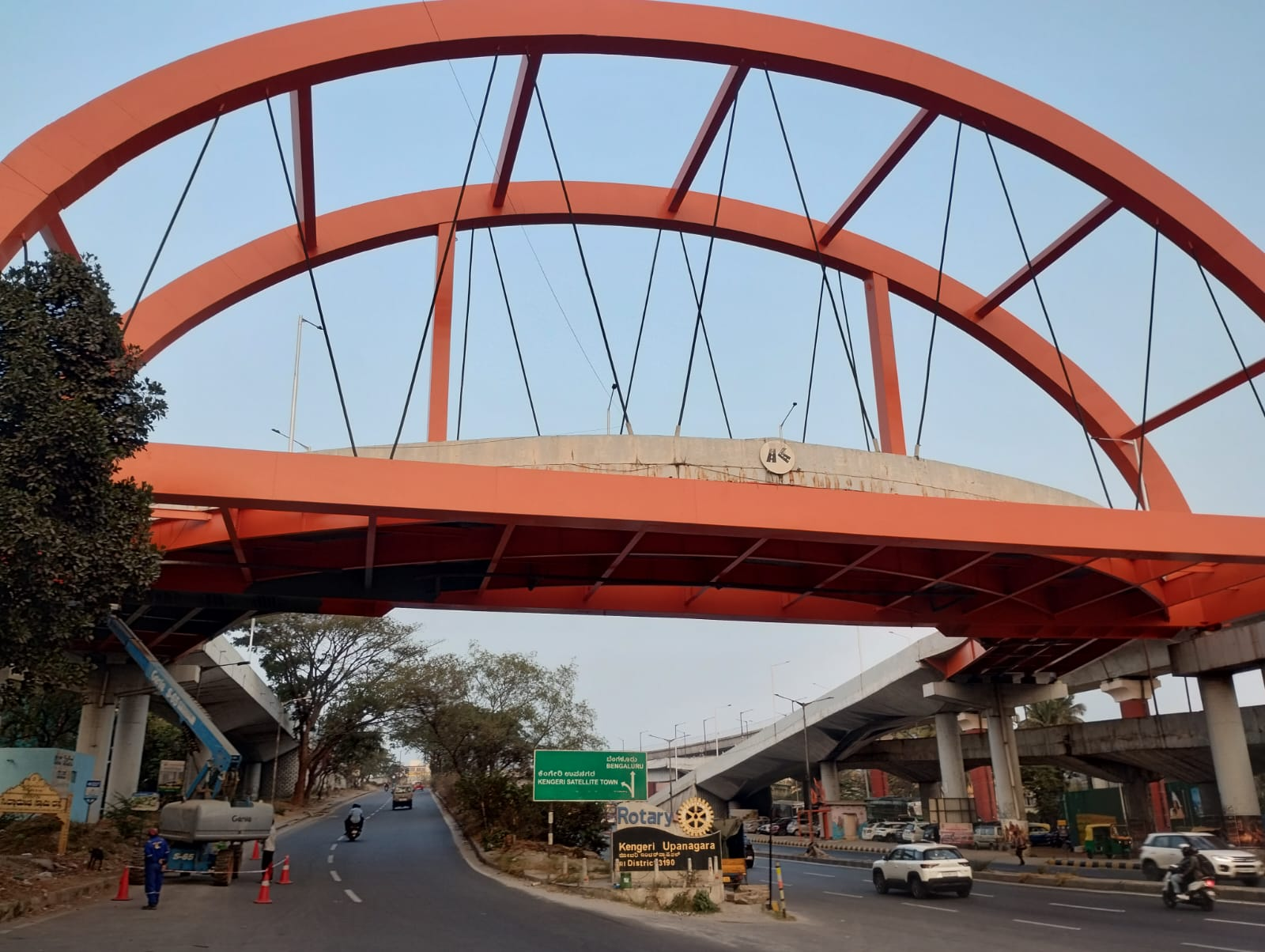
Kengeri Satellite Town Entrance (2026)

Kengeri was originally developed as a Satellite Town by Bangalore Development Authority over 30 years ago before being merged into BBMP limits. Localities in the suburb include Kenchanahalli, Dubasipalya, Mylasandra, Channasandra, Srinivasapura, Hemmigepura, Mylasandra, Kodipalya, Komaghatta and Kengeri Upanagara. Notable educational institutions located here include RNS Institute of Technology, J.S.S. Academy of Technical Education, R.V. College of Engineering, and SJB Institute of Technology.Bangalore University is located in close proximity to the suburb.Global Village Tech Park is situated in the suburb. Kengeri is such a place that has many added advantages in terms of transportation facilities. Kengeri is blessed with a prominent purple-line metro station, a railway station that serves as a stop for many trains plying in the route of Mysuru Jn (MYS) and Krantiveera Sangoli Rayana Railway Station Bengaluru (SBC) railway line, including Vande Bharat Express plying between Mysuru Jn (MYS) and MGR Chennai Central (MAS), a bustling Bengaluru-Mysuru Expressway and a connecting point for most of the towns in Bengaluru South. Kengeri also has access gates to enter and exit NICE (Nandi Infrastructure Corridor Enterprise) Road, by which it can easily cut short the distance between Electronic City, Bannerghatta Road, Kanakapura Road, and Tumkur Road.

== Places of worship. ==
The Karadi Betta near Kengeri has an Anjaneya Temple of great antiquity. It is said that the image was found under a tree and the temple was built about 500 years ago. According to a record here, the temple was rebuilt in 1845. Inside the garbhagriha, two inscription slabs carpeted into the floor, one behind and another in front of the main deity, are of Hoysala Narasimha. They announce some grants by the king to one Vechiyana for his military success.

The place has a small but an ancient Eshwara temple near the entrance to Kengeri Fort area. Tamil inscriptions are found in this temple commissioned by the Chola king Rajendra Chola. The Inscription details grants made to this temple.

There is a large mosque (masjid) on Bangalore—Mysore highway opposite the old bus stand. The old mosque was demolished and a new mosque has been reconstructed which is a two storied building having a capacity of approximately 2000 people.

Christian churches serve various denominations and include Christos Mar Thoma Church, St. Francis of Assisi Church, Shalom Church, St. Anthony's Shrine, The Pentecostal Mission Church, New Life AG Church, Paniel Gospel Telugu Church, Hope AG Church, Kengeri Evangelical Worship House, New Jerusalem Prayer House, The Church of Light, and Pushpa Sadan Church.

== Mutts ==
There is a Bande Mata of the Veerashaivas said to be about 800 years old. It is said that the mata was founded by one Channaveeraswamy who is believed to have been a contemporary of Bijjala, the most famous of the southern Kalachuri kings. There is also a Kabir Mutt, Shankar Mutt and a Raghavendra Swamy Mutt.

== Geography ==
Kengeri is located at 12.9°N 77.48°E. It has an average elevation of 826 metres (2709 feet).

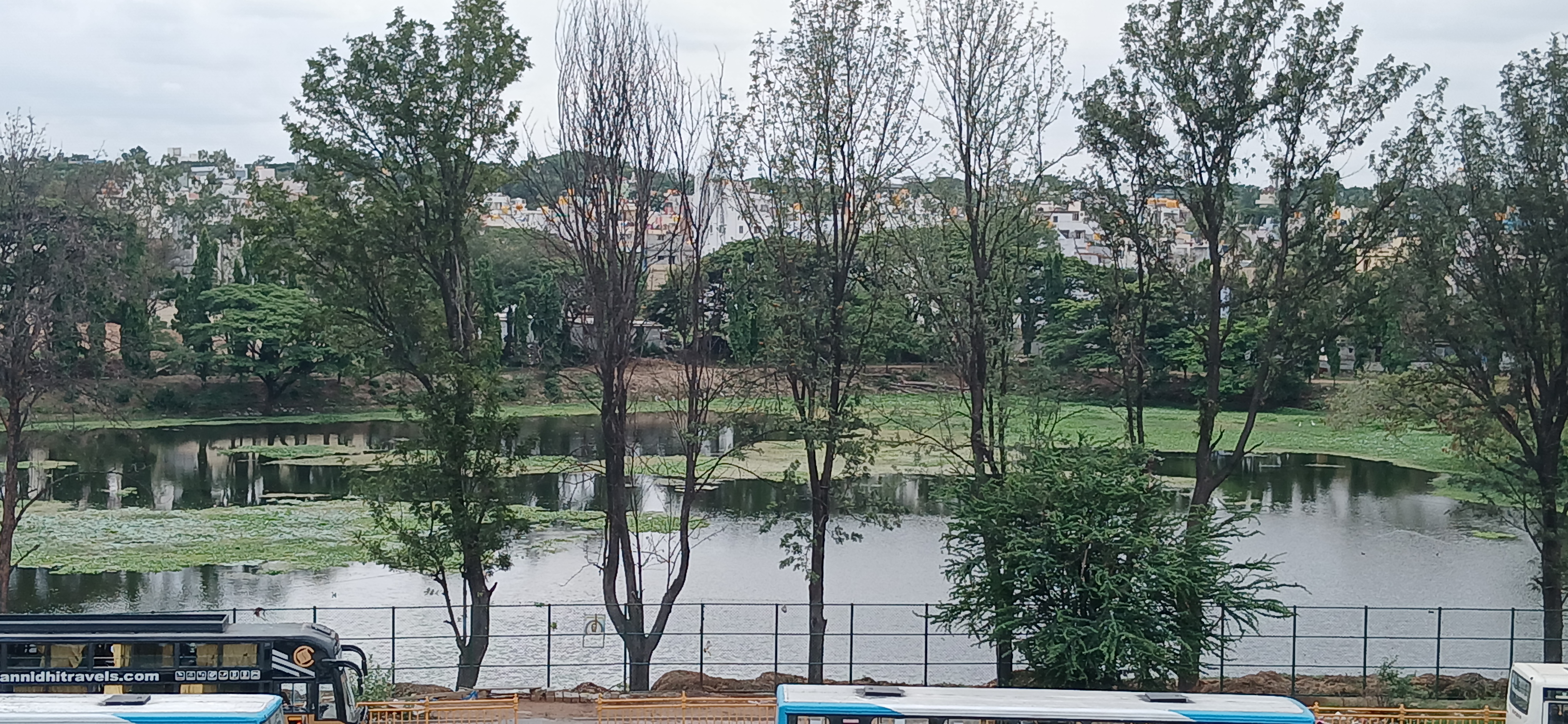
A view of Kengeri Lake from Kengeri Bus Terminal metro station

== Demographics ==
As of 2001 India census, Kengeri had a population of 42,386. Males constitute 52% of the population and females 48%. Kengeri has an average literacy rate of 75%, higher than the national average of 59.5%: male literacy is 79%, and female literacy is 70%. In Kengeri, 11% of the population is under 6 years of age.
