= List of taluks in Bengaluru Urban district =

Taluks of the Bengaluru Urban district

The Indian city of Bengaluru is in Bengaluru Urban district which has five taluks or local administrative divisions. It is in the state of Karnataka:

- Bengaluru
- Anekal
- Bengaluru North (Yelahanka)
- Bengaluru South (Kengeri)
- Bengaluru East (Krishnaraja Pura)
