= Tiruchchirappalli - Mayiladuthurai Express =

Express train in Tamil Nadu, India

★TIRUCHCHIRAPPALLI EXPRESS★
Overview
- Service type: Mail/Express
- Status: Active
- Locale: Tamil Nadu
- Current operator: South Western Railway zone
- Ridership: Express
- Annual ridership: Mail
- Website: www.indianrailways.gov.in

Route
- Termini: Tiruchirappalli Junction (TPJ); Mayiladuthurai Junction (MV)
- Stops: 6
- Distance travelled: 120 km (75 mi)
- Average journey time: 2 hours, 30 minutes
- Service frequency: Daily
- Train number: 16233/16234
- Lines used: Chennai Egmore–Thanjavur line (MV – TJ); Nagapattinam–Tiruchirappalli line (TJ – TPJ)

On-board services
- Classes: 2A, 3A, SL, GS and SLRD
- Disabled access: Disabled access
- Seating arrangements: Corridor coach (Unreserved)
- Sleeping arrangements: Couchette car
- Auto-rack arrangements: No
- Catering facilities: No
- Observation facilities: Windows in all carriages
- Entertainment facilities: No
- Baggage facilities: Overhead racks Baggage carriage

Technical
- Rolling stock: WAP-4 Locomotive from Arakkonam, Erode Electric Shed
- Track gauge: 1,676 mm (5 ft 6 in)
- Electrification: 25kV AC, 50 Hz (Overhead Traction)
- Operating speed: 48 kilometres per hour (30 mph)
- Track owner: Indian Railways
- Timetable number: 9 / 9A
- Rake maintenance: Tiruchirappalli Junction
- Rake sharing: Mysore-Mayiladuthurai Express, Mysore-Tuticorin Express

The Tiruchirappalli–Mayiladuthurai Express (via Kumbakonam) is a train which runs from Trichy to Mayiladuthurai in Tamil Nadu, India. The train is operated and the rakes are owned by South Western Railway. The train is numbered (16233/16234) in both directions.

== General information ==
The train runs between Tiruchchirappalli Jn to Mayiladuthurai Jn. When it completes its drive from Mysuru–Mayiladuthurai Express. The train starts from Mayiladuthurai Jn at 8:15 and reaches Tiruchchirappalli Jn at 10:40. In the return direction, it originates from Tiruchchirappalli Junction at 12:50 and reaches Mayiladuthurai Junction at 15:15. This train is more useful for people those who are travelling from Tiruchchirappalli Jn, Thanjavur Jn, Papanasam, Kumbakonam, Aduthurai, Kutralam and Mayiladuthurai Jn. These trains originate from both sides every day.

== Schedule ==
16233 ~ Mayiladuthurai Junction → Tiruchchirappalli Junction ★Tiruchchirappalli Express★
Station Name	Station Code	Arrival	Departure	Day
Mayiladuthurai Junction (Mayavaram)	MV	-	08:35	1
Kutralam	KTM	08:47	08:48	1
Aduthurai	ADT	08:59	09:00	1
Kumbakonam	KMU	09:10	09:12	1
Papanasam	PML	09:22	09:23	1
Thanjavur Junction (Tanjore)	TJ	09:42	09:44	
Budalur	BAL	10:00	10:01	
Tiruchchirappalli Junction (Trichy)	TPJ	11:05	-	
16234 ~ Tiruchchirappalli Junction → Mayiladuthurai Junction ★Mayiladuthurai Express★
Tiruchchirappalli Junction (Trichy)	TPJ	-	13:05	
Budalur	BAL	13:35	13:36	
Thanjavur Junction (Tanjore)	TJ	13:51	13:53	2
Papanasam	PML	14:13	14:14	2
Kumbakonam	KMU	14:26	14:28	2
Aduthurai	ADT	14:38	14:39	2
Kutralam	KTM	14:50	14:51	2
Mayiladuthurai Junction (Mayavaram)	MV	15:45	-	

== Rakes ==
Loco	1	2	3	4	5	6	7	8	9	10	11	12	13	14	15	16	17	18	19	20	21
	EOG	GS	GS	S13	S12	S11	S10	S9	S8	S7	S6	S5	S4	S3	S2	S1	B3	B2	B1	A1	EOG

== Rake sharing ==
Mysore-Mayiladuthurai Express and Mysore-Tuticorin Express

== See also ==
- Cholan Express
- Vaigai Superfast Express
- Rockfort Superfast Express
- Tiruchirappalli–Tirunelveli Intercity Express
- Mayiladuthurai–Mysore Express
- Pallavan Superfast Express
- Vasco da Gama–Velankanni Weekly Express
