= Chennai Central–Mysore Shatabdi Express =

Shatabdi Express train route in India

MGR Chennai Central - Mysuru Junction Shatabdi Express
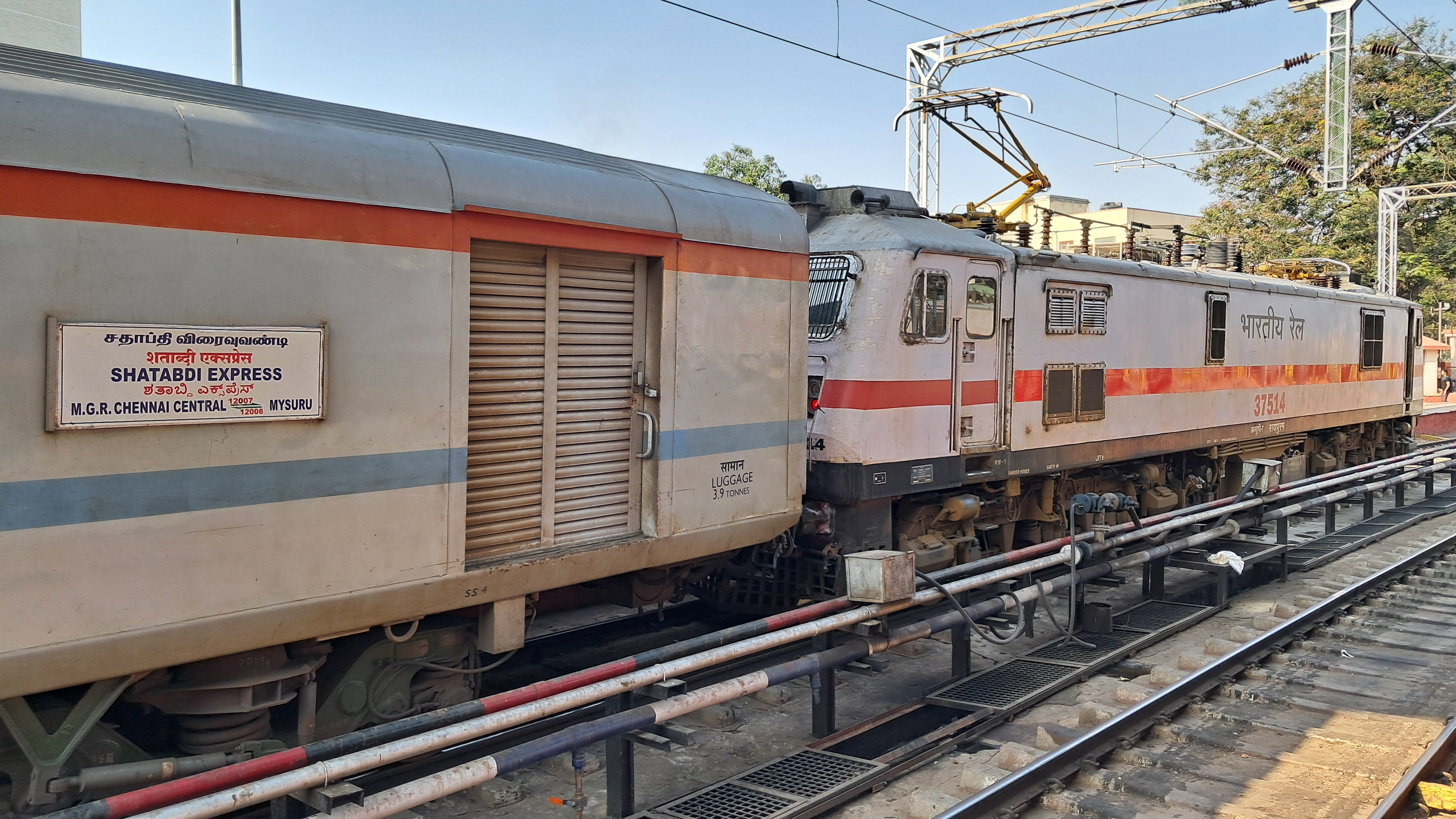
- Mysuru - Chennai Central Shatabdi Express on standby at KSR Bengaluru City Jn

Overview
- Service type: Shatabdi Express
- Status: Operational
- First service: 11 May 1994; 32 years ago
- Current operator: Southern Railways

Route
- Termini: Chennai Central (MAS); Mysuru Junction (MYS)
- Stops: 2
- Distance travelled: 500 km (310 mi)
- Average journey time: 7 hours as 12007 Chennai Central–Mysuru Junction Shatabdi Express, 7 hours 25 mins as 12008 Mysuru Junction–Chennai Central Shatabdi Express
- Service frequency: Six days a week (Note: Except Thursdays)
- Train number: 12007 / 12008

On-board services
- Classes: Anubhuti class, Executive class, AC chair car,
- Seating arrangements: Yes
- Sleeping arrangements: No
- Catering facilities: No Pantry car attached but available
- Baggage facilities: Overhead racks

Technical
- Rolling stock: Indian Railways LHB coaches
- Track gauge: 1,676 mm (5 ft 6 in)
- Electrification: Yes
- Operating speed: 110 km/h (68 mph) maximum, 71.5 km/h (44 mph) including halts

The 12007/08 Chennai Central–Mysuru Junction Shatabdi Express is a Superfast Express train of the Shatabdi Express category belonging to Indian Railways, Southern Railway zone, that runs between Chennai Central and Mysuru Junction in India. It is the first Shatabdi Express in South India.

It operates as train number 12007 from Chennai Central to Mysuru Junction, and as train number 12008 in the reverse direction while also connecting the capital cities of the states of Tamil Nadu and Karnataka.

== Service ==
The 12007 Chennai Central–Mysuru Junction Shatabdi Express covers the distance of 500 km (310 mi) in 7 hours 00 mins averaging 71.43 km/h (44.38 mph) and in 7 hours 25 minutes as 12008 Mysuru Junction–Chennai Central Shatabdi Express averaging 67.42 km/h (41.89 mph) including halts.

== Coaches ==
earlier on first run was ICF Shatabdi liveried coaches (from 2003 to 2012), now in 2013 gets an LHB coaches upgrade equipped with one LHB Anubhuti coach in the middle or at the back of the train

== Loco link ==
earlier was WAM-4 and WAP-1. Prior end 2017 due to partial electrification of the route, an Arakkonam or Royapuram-based WAP-4 or WAP-7 would haul the train between Chennai Central & KSR Bengaluru Station handing over to a Hubli-based WDP-4 or WDG-4 and Tondiarpet-based WDM-3D or WDM-3A which would then power the train up to Mysuru Junction.

Since the entire route is now completely electrified, the train is now hauled end to end by a Royapuram or Erode based WAP-7 or WAP-5 locomotive which are equipped with head-on generation(HOG) technology.

== Gallery ==
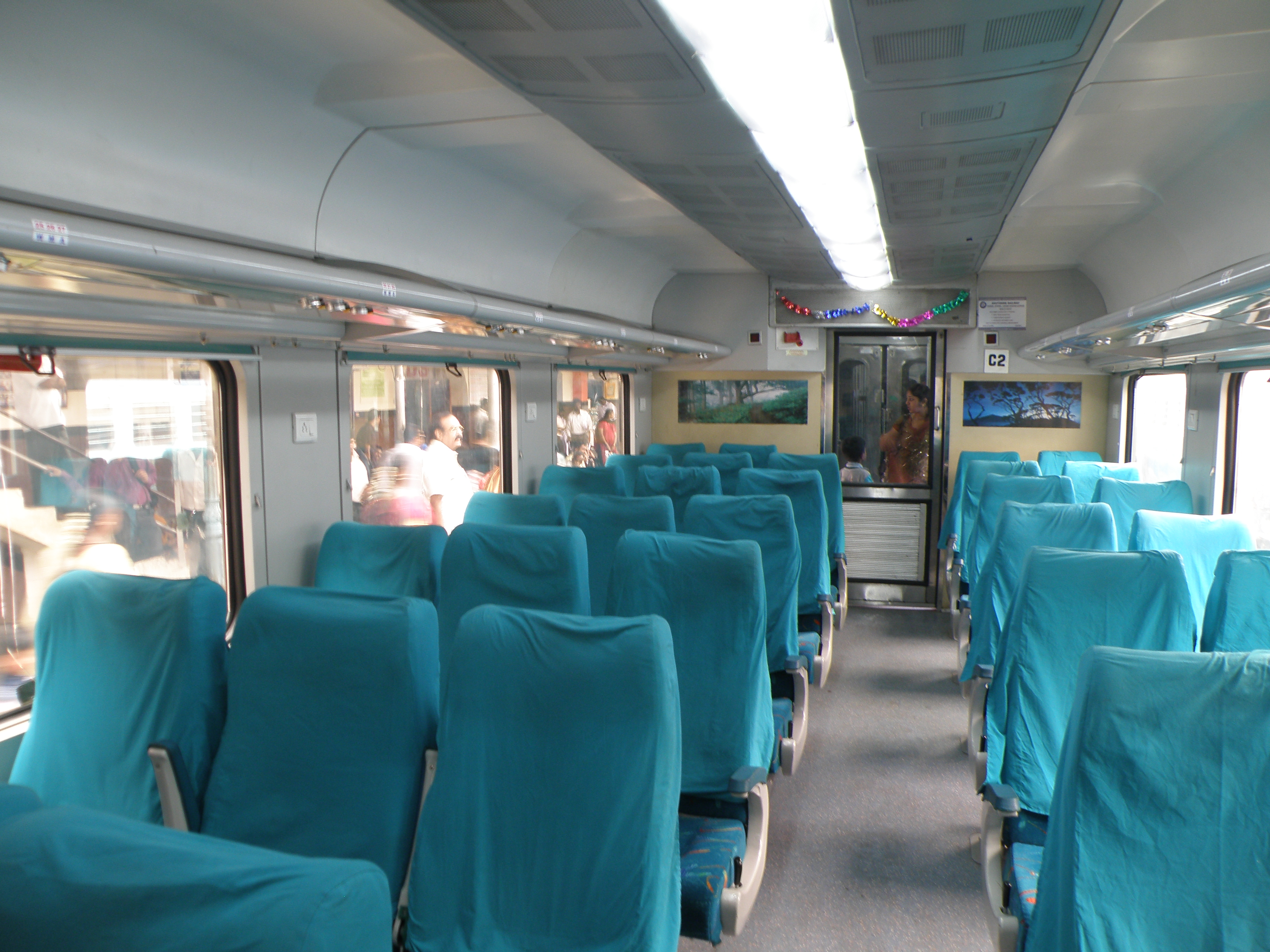
Interior view of AC Chair Car coach

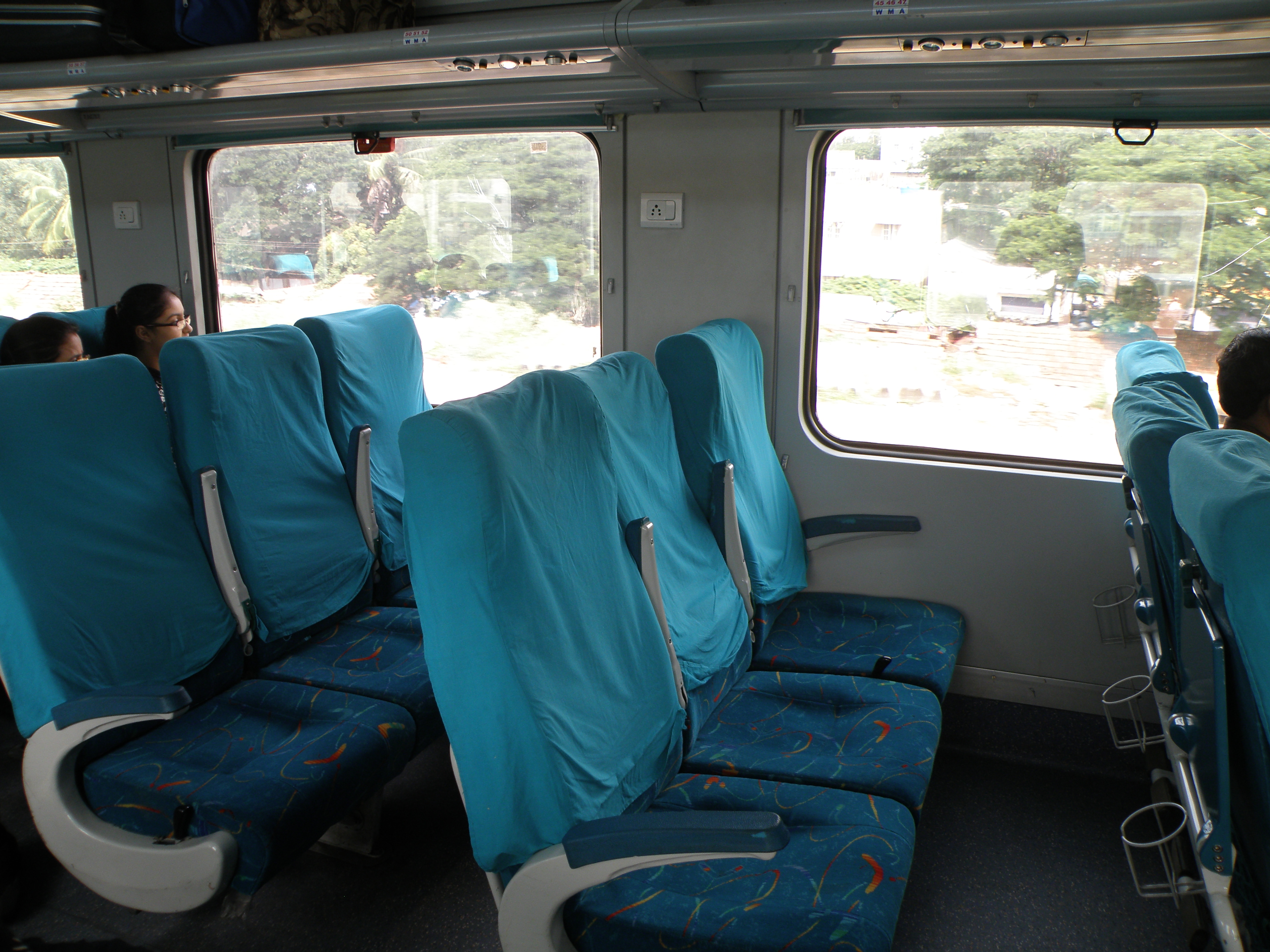
Interior picture of AC Chair Car coach

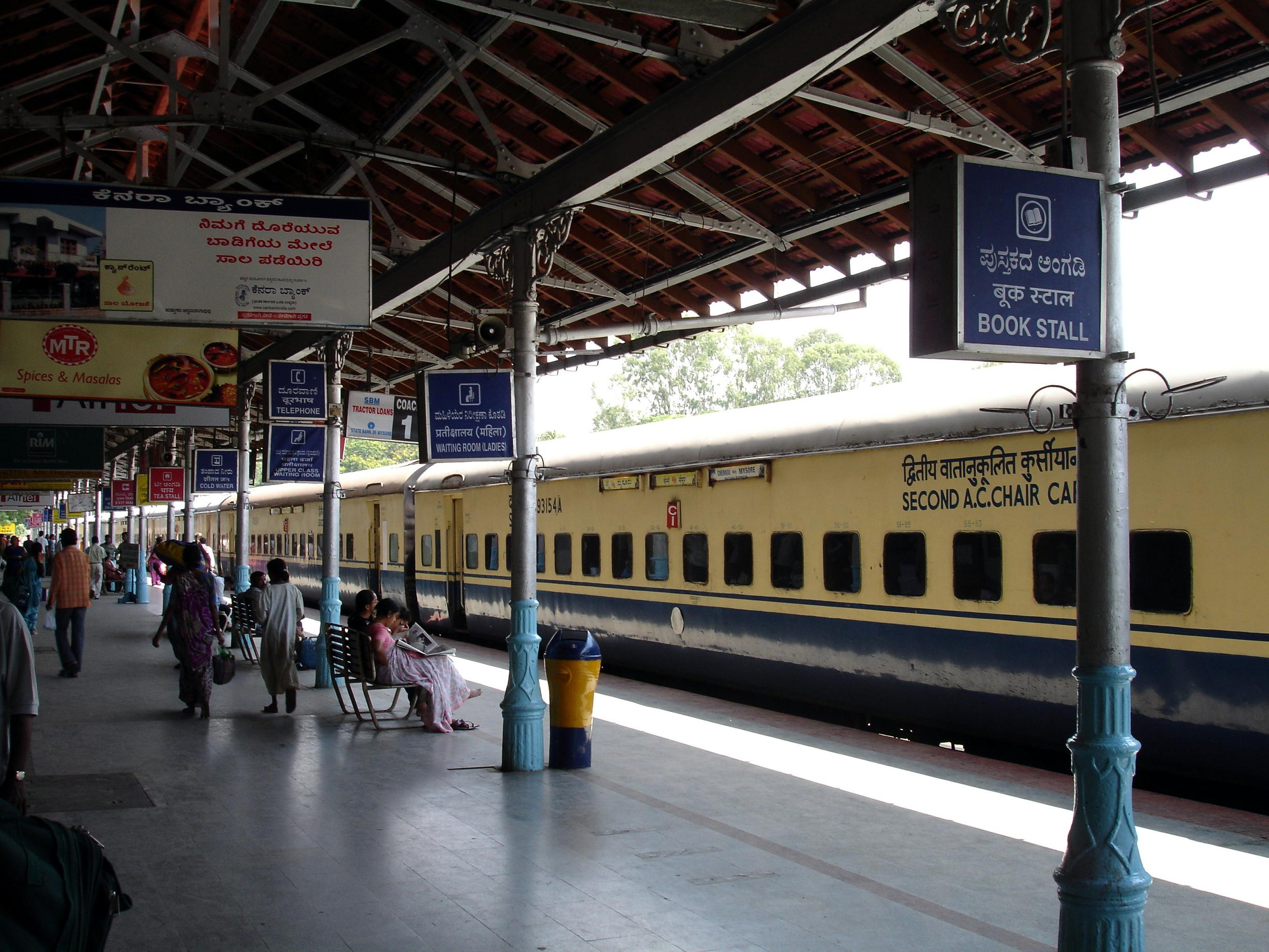
This Shatabdi Express on standby at Mysuru Junction

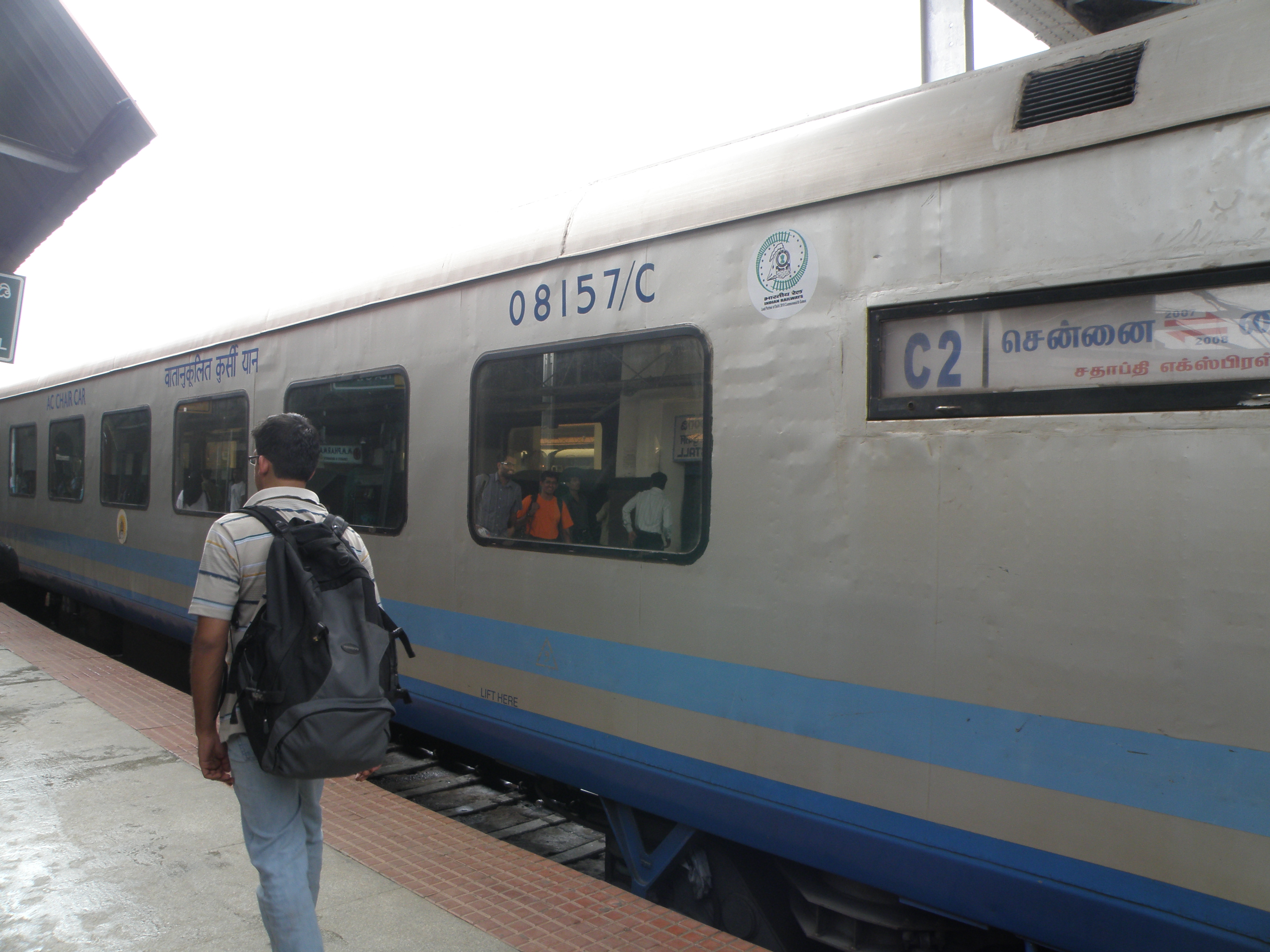
Train Board of this Shatabdi Express train

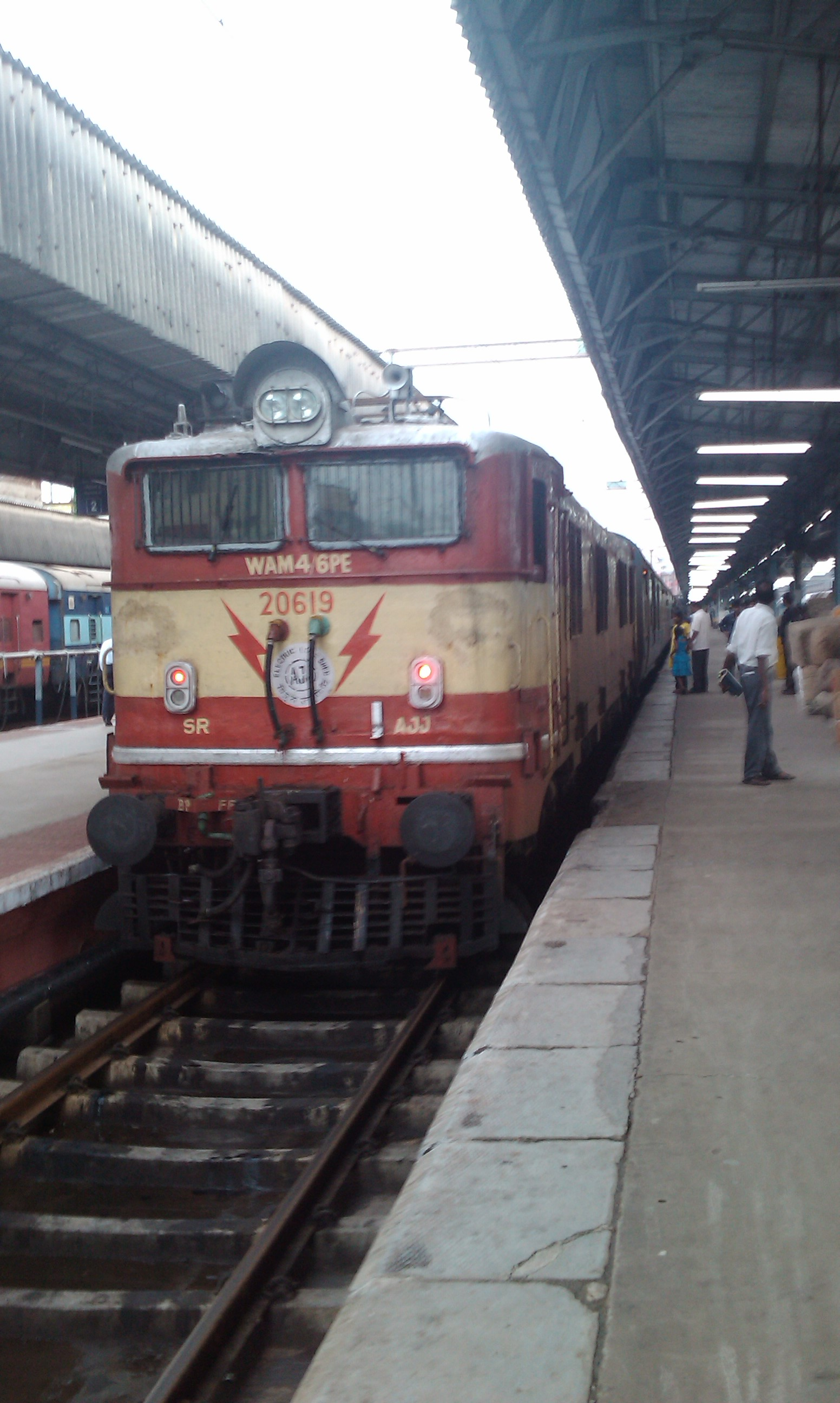
WAM-4 Arakkonam Locomotive pulling this Shatabdi Express train

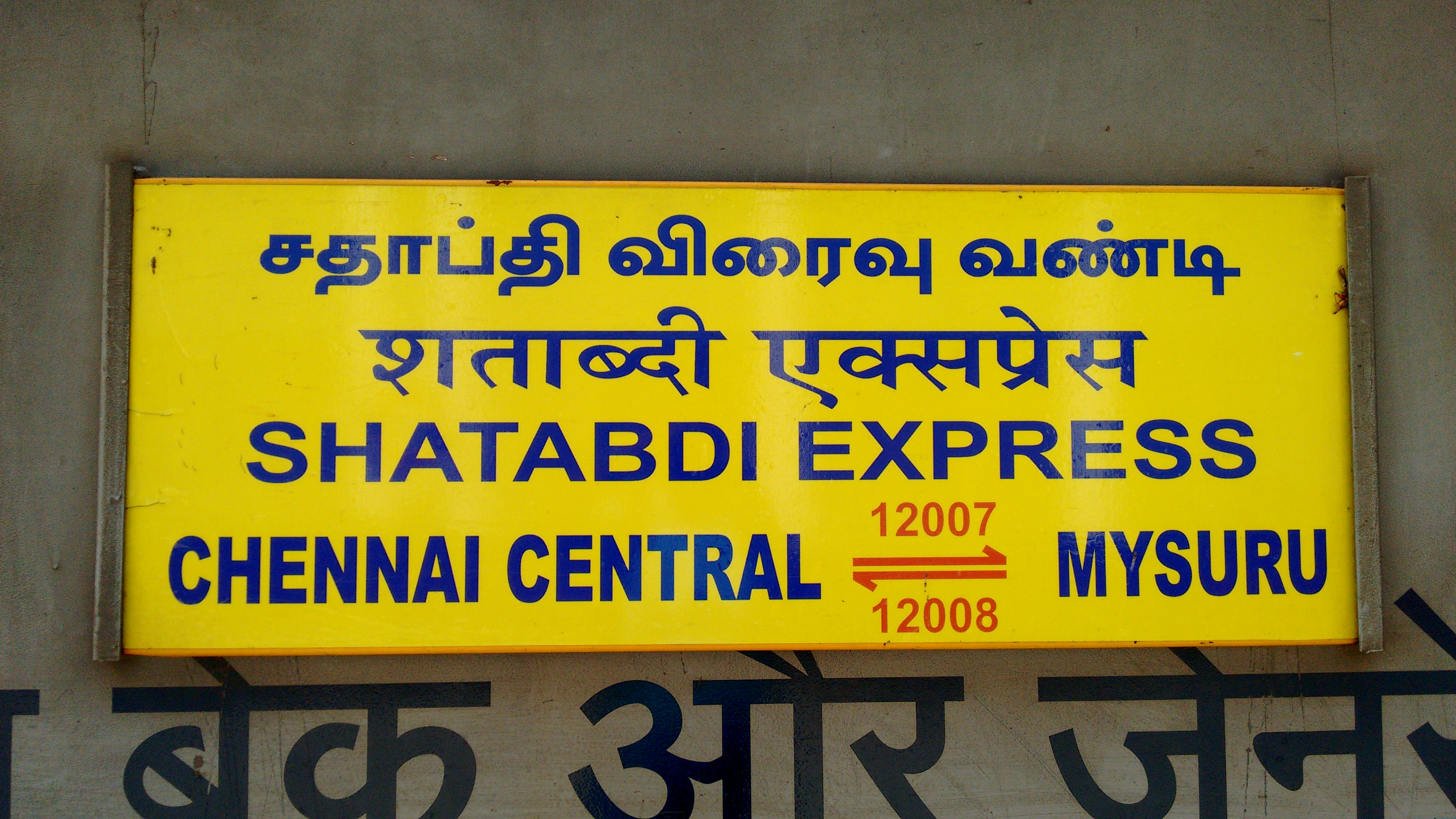
Train Board of this Shatabdi Express train

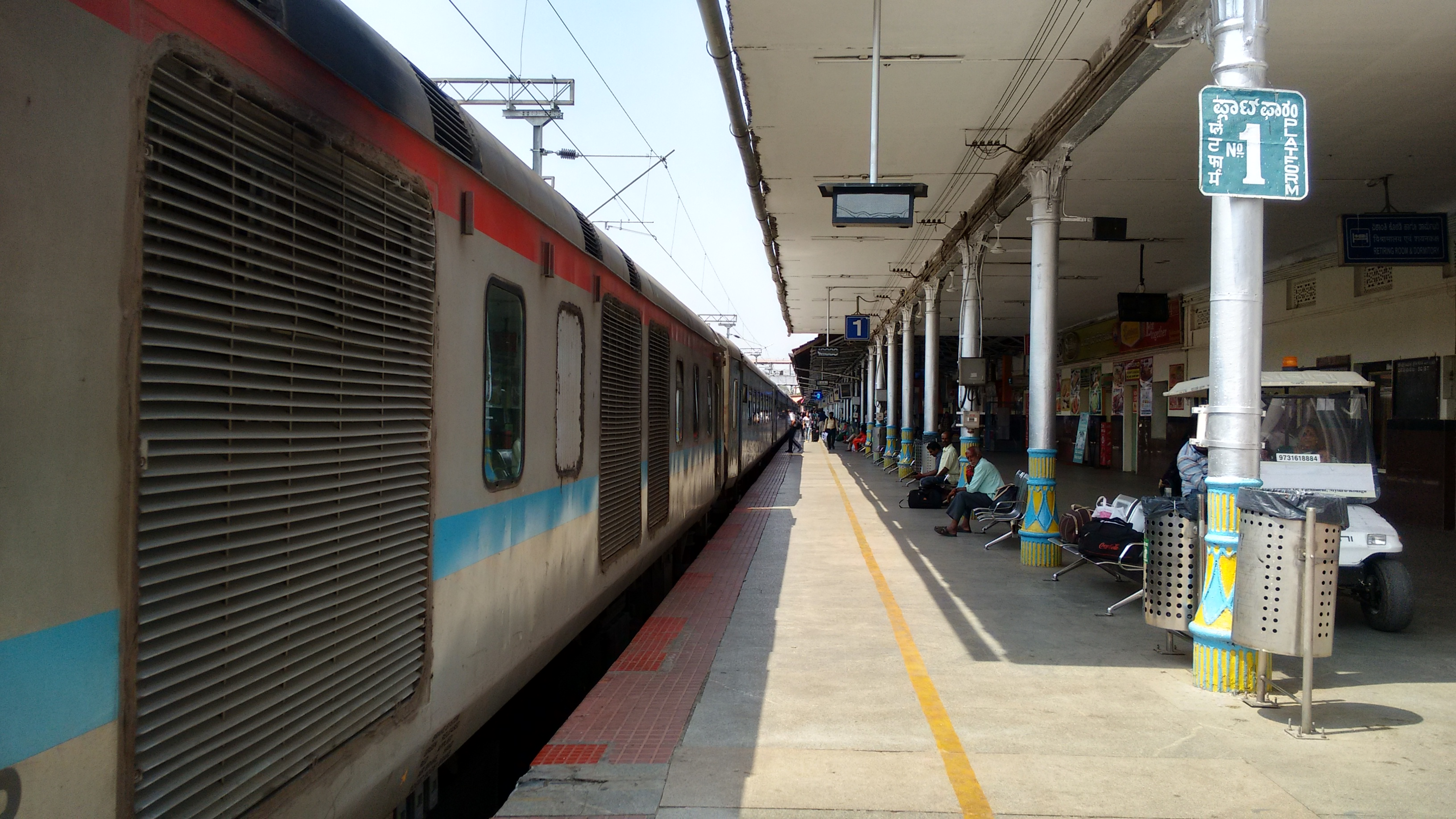
This railway station on standby at Mysuru Junction

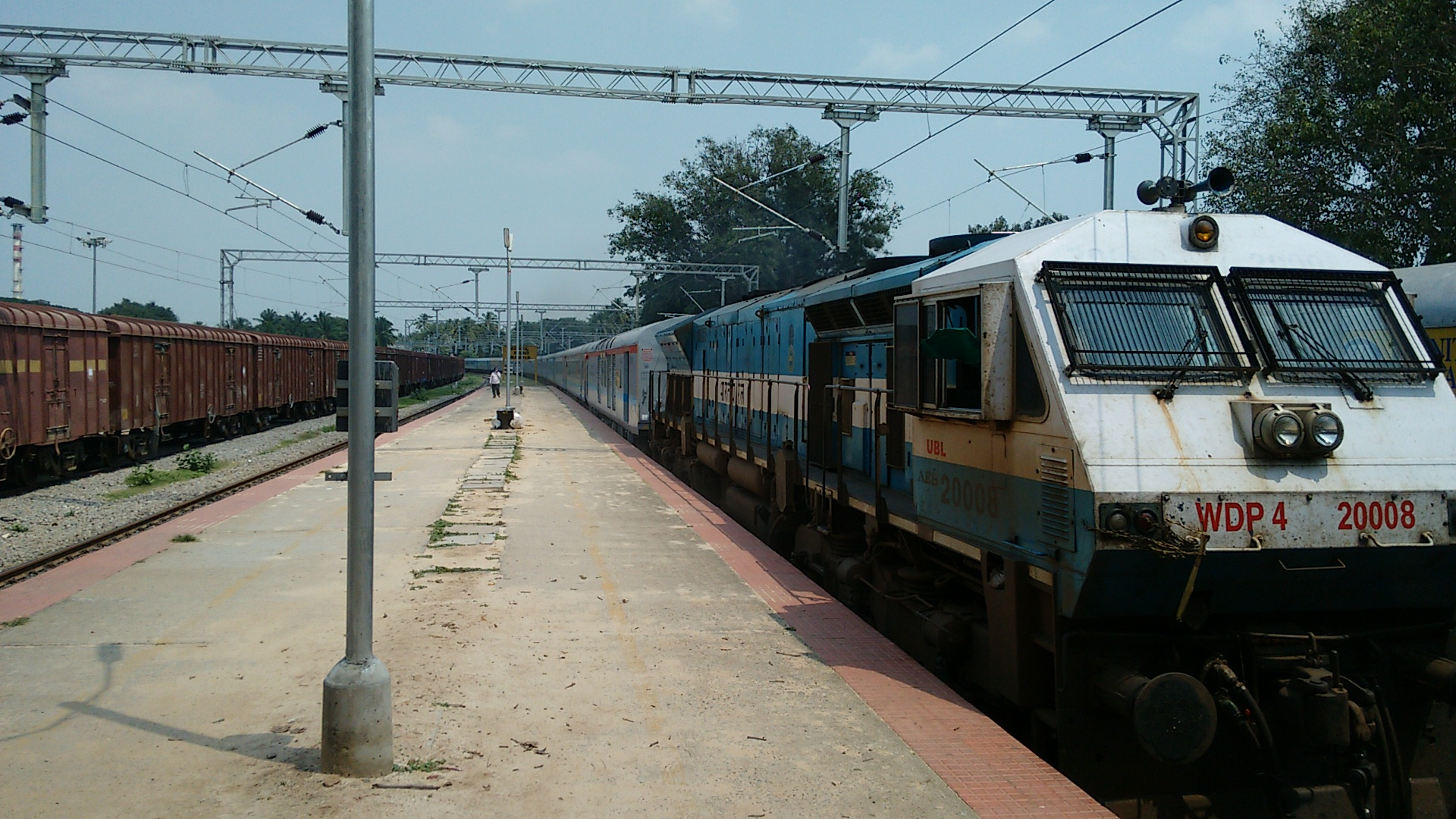
This express train passing through Mandya railway station

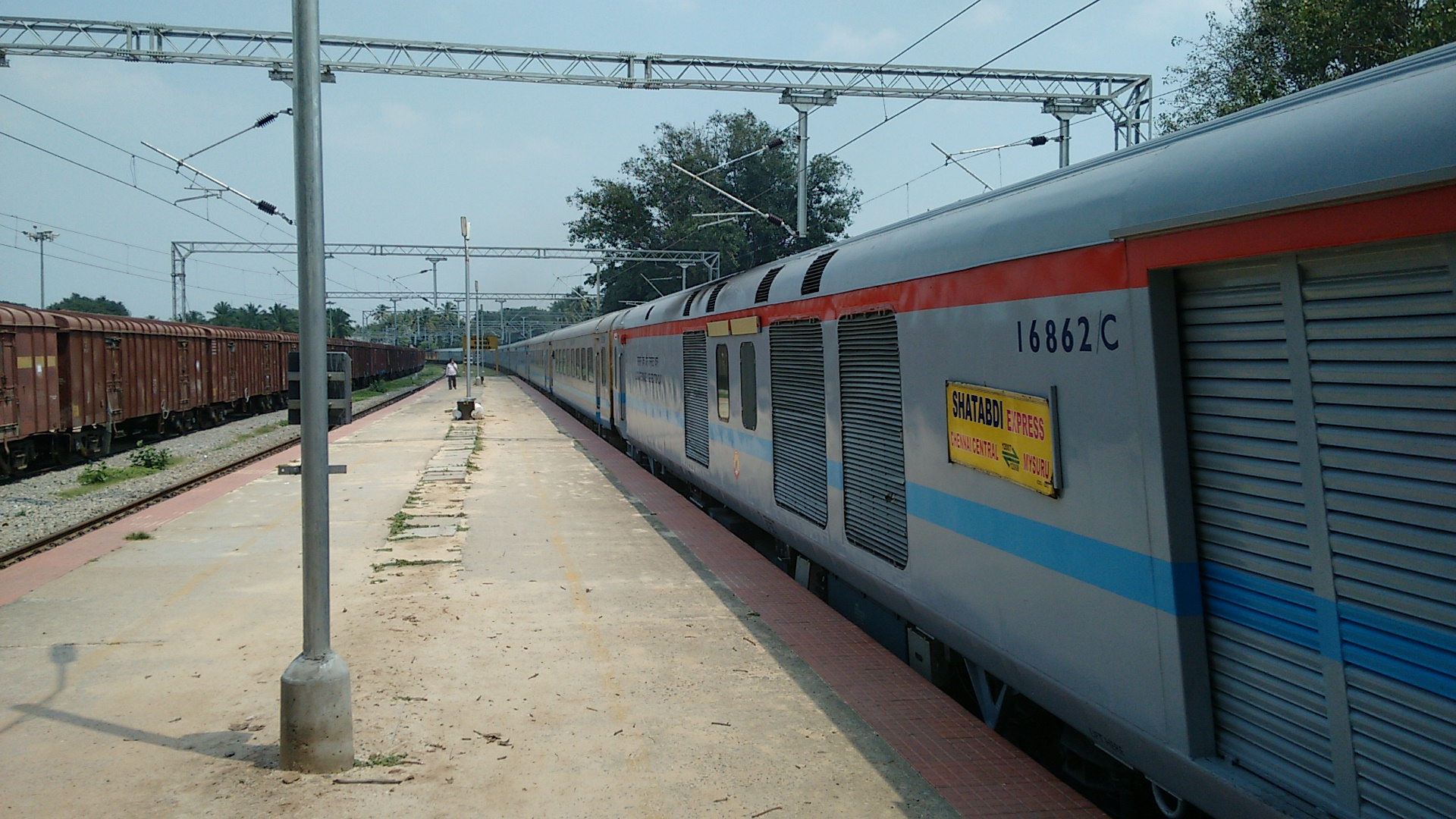
This express train passing through Mandya railway station

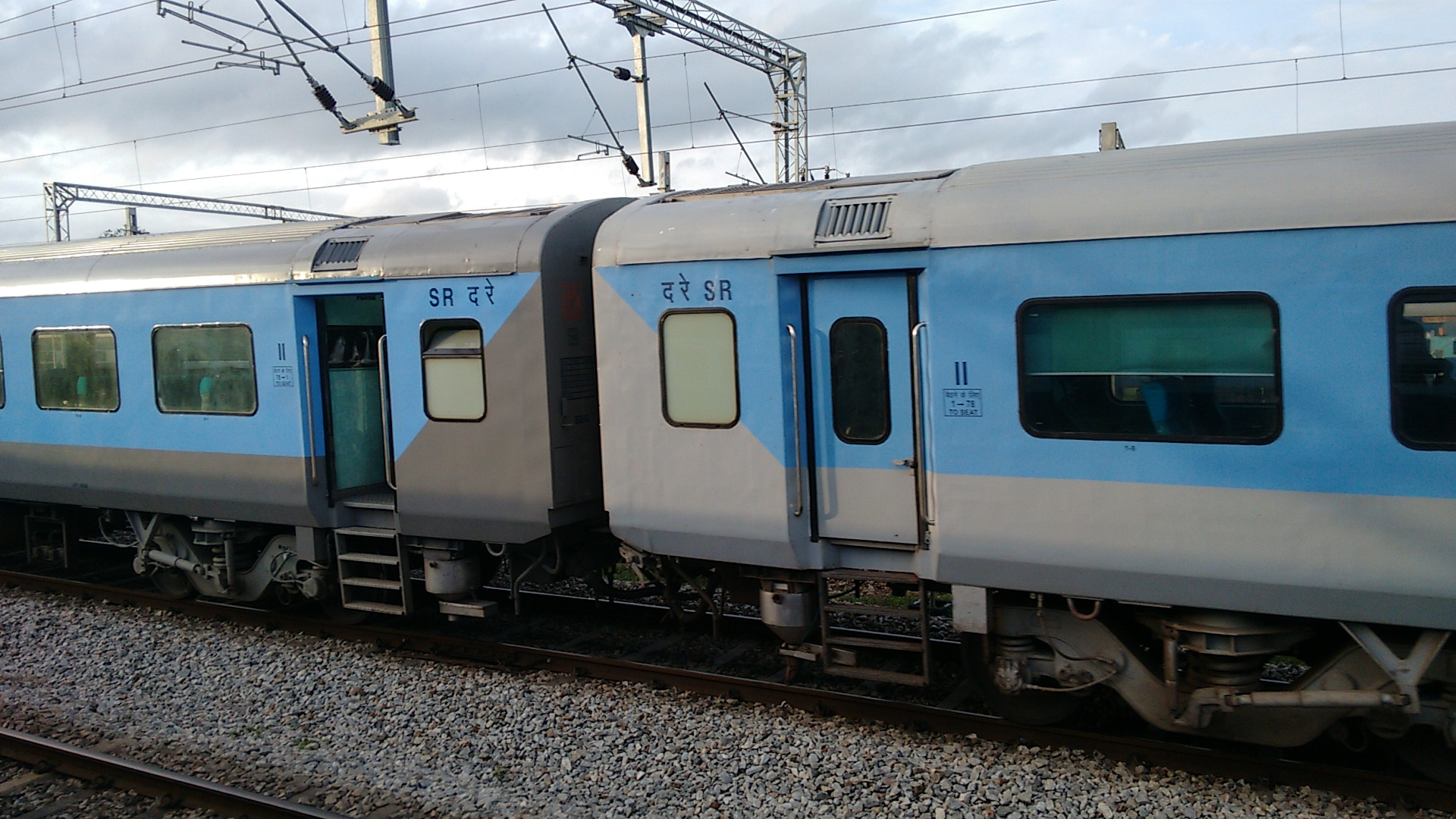
This Shatabdi Express entering Mysuru Junction captured from out going Mysuru–Tuticorin Express

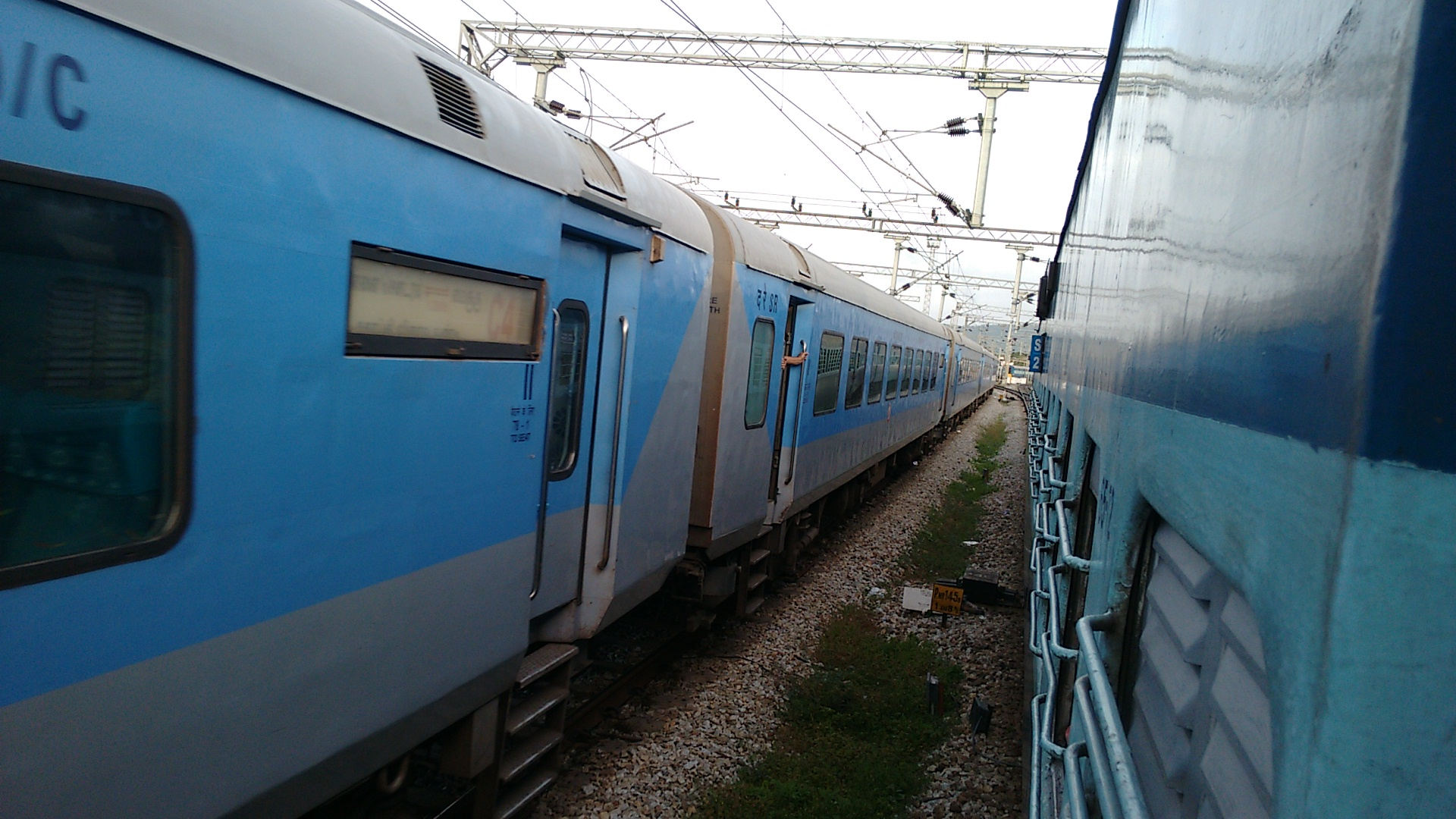
This Shatabdi Express entering Mysuru Junction captured from out going Mysuru–Tuticorin Express
