= Mysuru–Cuddalore Port Express =

Express train in India

Mysore–Cuddalore Port Express
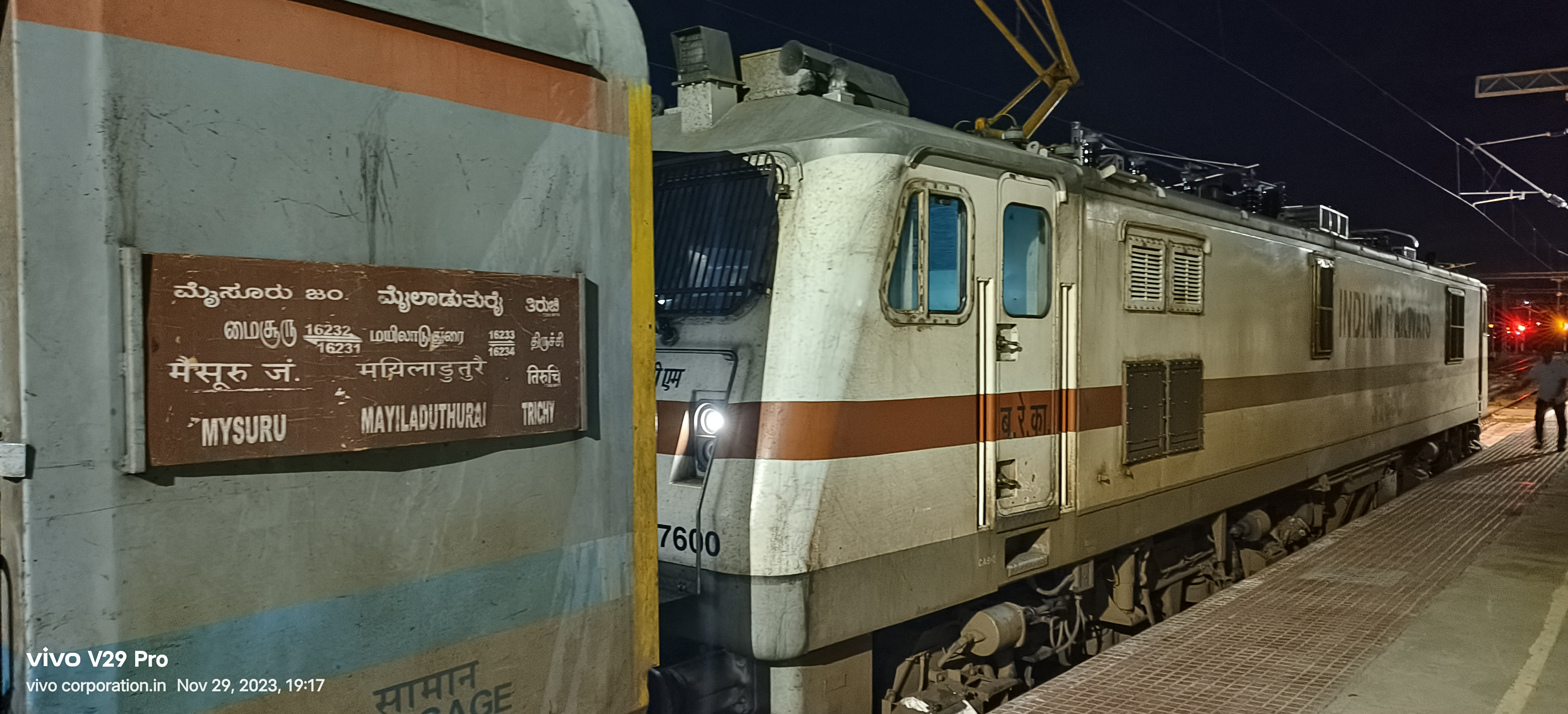
- Mysuru - Cuddalore Port (Thanjavur) Express at Thanjavur Junction Railway Station with WAP-7 Locomotive

Overview
- Service type: Mail/Express
- Status: Active
- Locale: Karnataka & Tamil Nadu
- First service: 1989 (37 years ago)
- Current operator: South Western Railway zone
- Former operator: Indian Railways
- Ridership: Mail/Express
- Daily ridership: 1550
- Annual ridership: Mail/Express
- Website: www.indianrailways.gov.in

Route
- Termini: Mysore Junction (MYS); Cuddalore Port Junction (CUPJ)
- Stops: 24
- Distance travelled: 753 km (468 mi)
- Average journey time: 16 Hours 20 Minutes
- Service frequency: Daily
- Train numbers: 16231 (UP); 16232 (DOWN)
- Lines used: MS - MV : Chennai Egmore - Mayiladuthurai (Mayavaram) via Cuddalore Port Junction (CUPJ) Main Line; MV - TPJ : Trichy - Thanjavur Main Line; TPJ - ED : Trichy - Coimbatore Main Line; ED - SA : Coimbatore - Jolarpettai - Katpadi Main Line; SA - MYS : Salem - Bangalore - Mysore Main Line

On-board services
- Classes: 1 2nd A/C II Tire (A); 5 3rd A/C III Tire (B); 11 Sleeper (SL); 2 Unreserved (GS); 2 End On Generator (EOG)
- Disabled access: Disabled access
- Seating arrangements: Corridor coach (unreserved)
- Sleeping arrangements: Couchette car
- Auto-rack arrangements: No
- Catering facilities: No
- Observation facilities: Windows in all carriages
- Entertainment facilities: No
- Baggage facilities: Overhead racks Baggage carriage
- Other facilities: CCTV Camera's In All Coaches

Technical
- Rolling stock: CUPJ - TPJ : WAP-7 or WAG-9 Locomotive From Electric Loco Shed, Royapuram, Erode / WAP-4 Locomotive From Electric Loco Shed, Erode, Arakkonam; TPJ - ED : WAP-7 or WAP-4 Locomotive From Electric Loco Shed, Royapuram, Erode / WAP-4 Locomotive From Electric Loco Shed, Erode, Arakkonam; ED - MYS : WAP-7 or WAP-4 and WAG-9 Locomotive From Electric Loco Shed, Royapuram, Erode, Krishnarajapuram
- Track gauge: 1,676 mm (5 ft 6 in)
- Electrification: 25 kV AC 50 Hz (Overhead Electric Traction)
- Operating speed: 65 kilometres per hour (40 mph)
- Average length: 21 Coaches
- Track owner: Indian Railways
- Timetable number: 69 / 69A
- Rake maintenance: Mysore Junction
- Rake sharing: 16235/16236 Mysuru–Tuticorin Express

Mysore–Cuddalore Port Express (previously Mysuru–Mayiladuthurai Express) is a overnight regional rail service connecting Cuddalore Port Junction in Tamil Nadu with Mysore Junction in Karnataka via Bangalore City, Erode Junction, Tiruchchirappalli Junction and Thanjavur Junction. From July 19, 2024, this train was extended and run between Cuddalore Port Junction and Mysore Junction.

== History ==
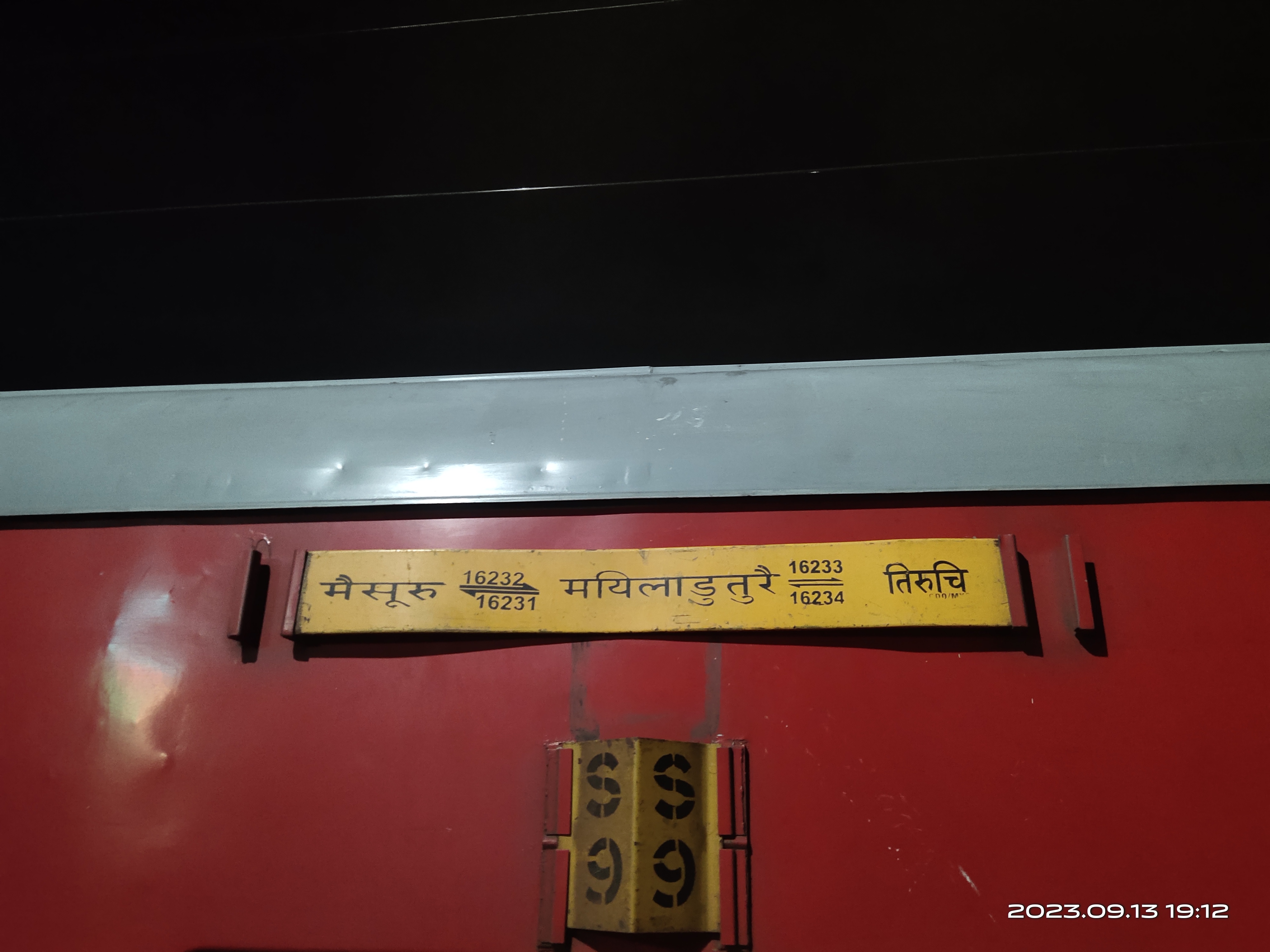

Initially, numbered as 31 / 32, this service had 4 slip coaches linked with Island Express at Erode. Later, C. K. Jaffer Sharief, the then Minister of Railways, introduced an exclusive full service between Bengaluru and Trichy as Train No.6531 / 6532 operated by Bengaluru railway division of Southern Railway zone, (before the formation of South Western Railway zone).

== Extensions ==
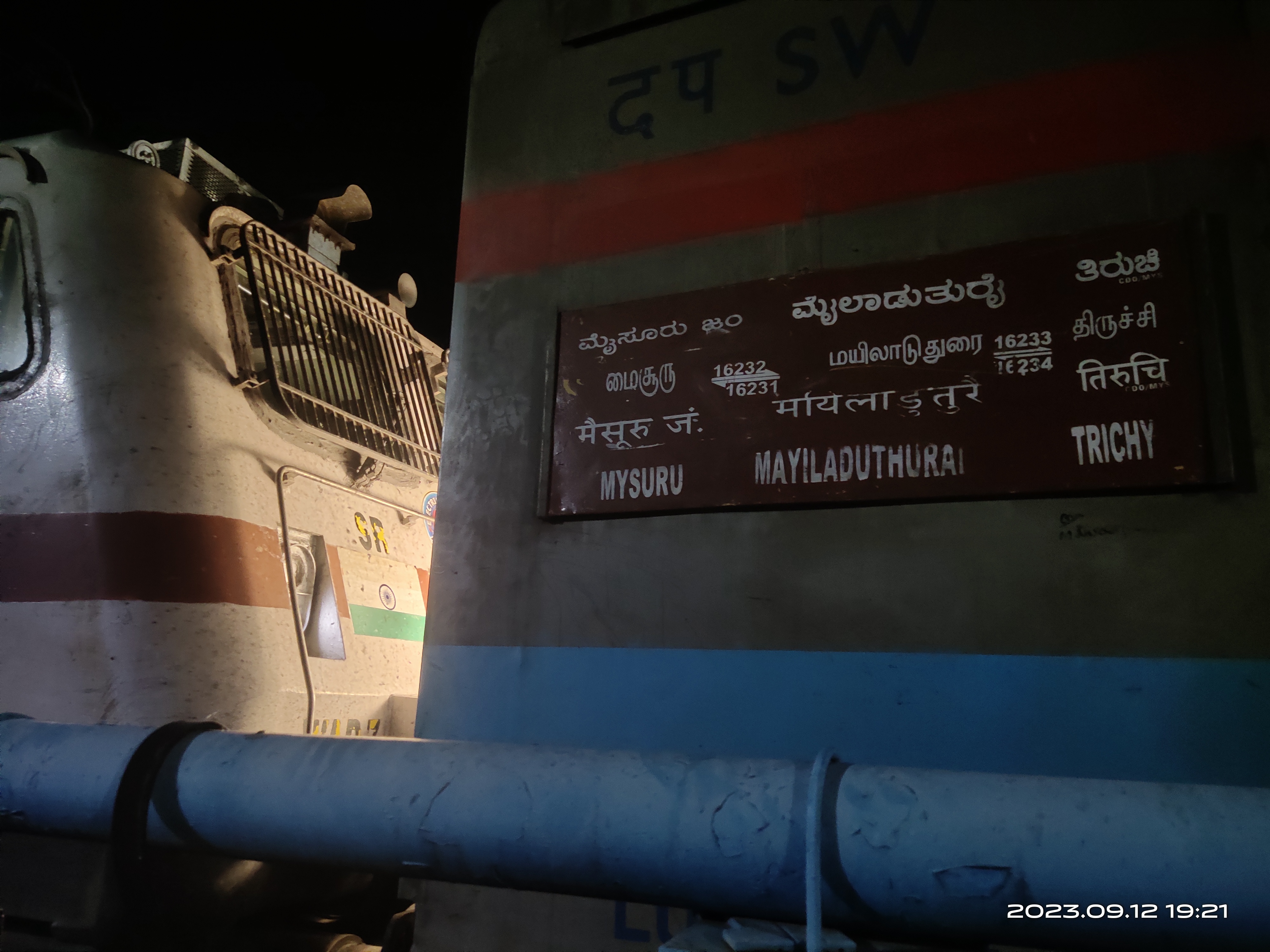

Few coaches of the train were amalgamated and bifurcated at Karur for Madurai, numbered as 6531A / 6532A. After changing the train number from 6531 / 6532 to 6231 / 6232, it was first extended to Mysore, then to Thanjavur and to Nagore. On 29 June 2002, the train number was changed from 6231 / 6232 to 6831 / 6832 as the service was transferred from Mysore railway division to Tiruchirappalli Railway Division with stoppage at Maddur was cancelled. The Tiruchi–Nagore service was trimmed for the execution of gauge conversion in the Tiruchi–Nagore section, sanctioned in 1995–1996 Railway Budget. As the Tiruchi–Thanjavur part was completed in 1998, the service again extended back to Thanjavur. After the completion of gauge conversion Thanjavur–Kumbakonam section in Chennai Egmore–Thanjavur line, Lalu Prasad Yadav, the then Railway Minister extended the service up to Kumbakonam, which was effected since 9 January 2006 along with change in train number from 6831 / 6832 to 6231 / 6232. Further, the service was extended up to Mayiladuthurai Junction, and was effected since 17 June 2006. The train number was changed from 6231 / 6232 to 16231 / 16232 since December 2010 onwards as a part of train management system over the entire Indian Railways network. There is a constant demand from delta people to divert this train through Salem-Namakkal-Karur line for reduce the travel time and also the fare. With effect from July 19, 2024, this train's service has been extended to Cuddalore Port Junction (CUPJ)

== Coach composition ==
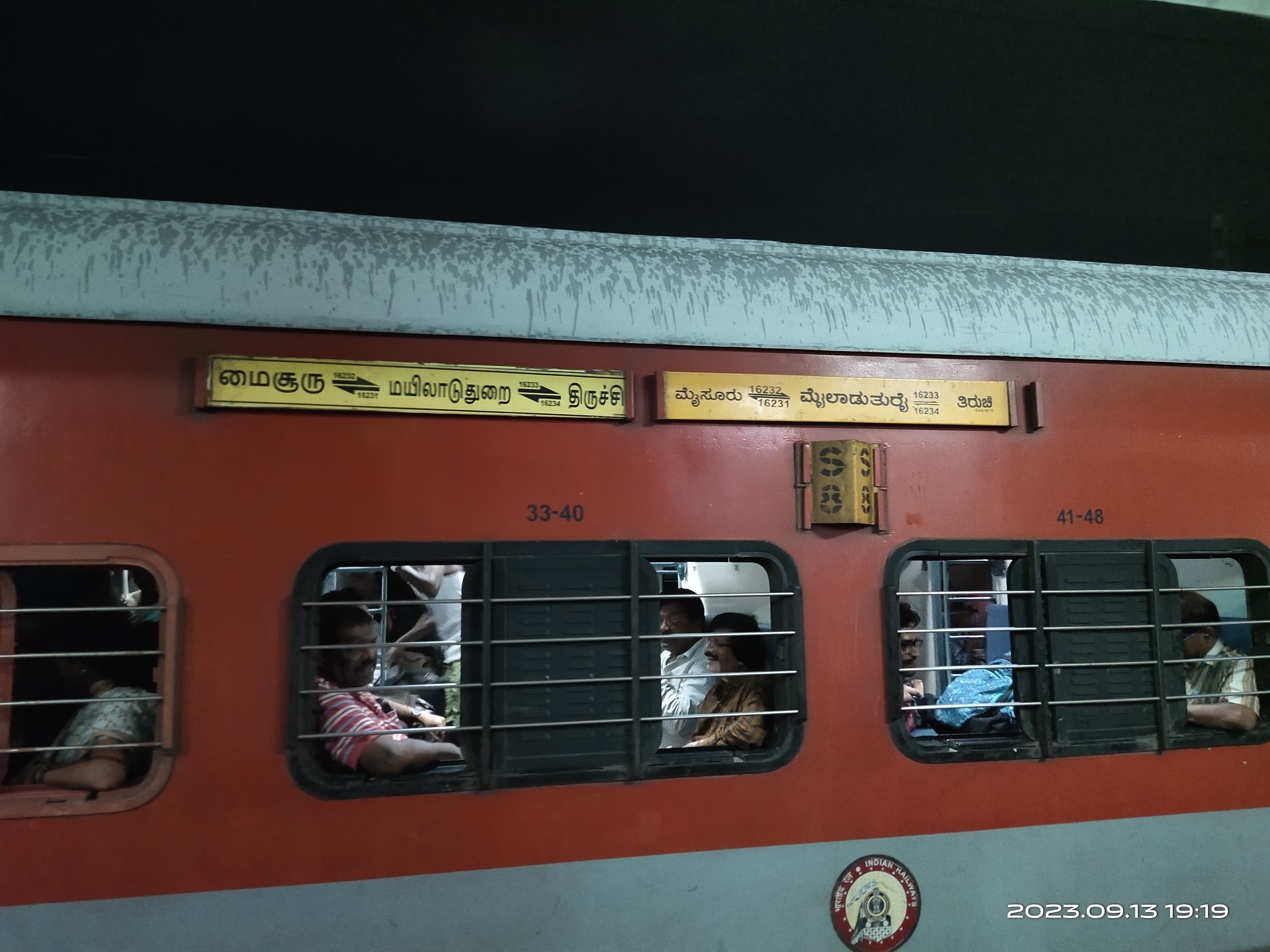

The train runs consists of 21 standard LHB carriages (earlier was ICF coaches):

Loco	1	2	3	4	5	6	7	8	9	10	11	12	13	14	15	16	17	18	19	20	21
	EOG	UR	UR	S11	S10	S9	S8	S7	S6	S5	S4	S3	S2	S1	B5	B4	B3	B2	B1	A1	EOG

== Traction ==
earlier they used to run with WDP-4 and WDP-4D. As the route fully electrified the train run end to end with WAP-7 and WAG-9 or WAP-4

== Schedule ==
Some of the prominent stoppages include Dharmapuri, Thanjavur Junction, Tiruchchirappalli Junction, Erode Junction, Salem Junction, Hosur, Bangalore City and Kengeri. This daily train numbered 16231 departs, Cuddalore Port Junction every evening as "Mysore Express", reverses loco twice at Tiruchirappalli Junction and Erode Junction arrives Mysore Junction next morning. In the return journey, the train departs Mysore Junction as "Cuddalore Express", numbered 16232 during late noon, follows the same route and reverses loco twice at Erode Junction and Tiruchirappalli Junction arrives Cuddalore Port Junction next morning. (Note: The schedule and route are subject to change.)

16231 - Cuddalore Port→ Mysuru ~ Mysuru Express
Station/Junction Name	Station Code	Arrival	Departure	Day
Cuddalore Port	CUPJ	SOURCE	15:40	1
Chidambaram	CDM	16:08	16:10	1
Sirkazhi	SY	16:25	16:26	1
Mayiladuthurai Junction	MV	17:30	17:40	1
Kutralam	KTM	17:52	17:53	1
Aduthurai	ADT	18:05	18:06	1
Kumbakonam	KMU	18:18	18:20	1
Papanasam	PML	18:31	18:32	1
Thanjavur Junction	TJ	18:53	18:55	1
Budalur	BAL	19:13	19:14	1
Thiruverumbur	TRB	19:31	19:32	1
Tiruchchirappalli Junction	TPJ	20:20	20:30	1
Tiruchchirappalli Fort	TP	20:40	20:42	1
Kulithalai	KLT	21:19	21:20	1
Karur Junction	KRR	21:58	22:00	1
Pugalur	PGR	22:19	22:20	1
Erode Junction	ED	23:25	23:35	1
Salem Junction	SA	00:27	00:30	2
Dharmapuri	DPJ	02:06	02:07	2
Hosur	HSRA	03:33	03:35	2
Karmelaram	CRLM	04:04	04:05	2
Bangalore Cantonment	BNC	05:04	05:05	2
KSR Bengaluru City Junction	SBC	05:35	05:40	2
Kengeri	KG	05:59	06:00	2
Maddur	MAD	06:45	06:46	2
Mandya	MAY	07:03	07:05	2
Mysore Junction	MYS	08:35	DEST	2
16232 - Mysuru → Cuddalore~ Cuddalore Express
Mysore Junction	MYS	SOURCE	16:15	1
Mandya	MAY	16:52	16:53	1
Maddur	MAD	17:11	17:12	1
Kengeri	KGI	18:01	18:02	1
KSR Bengaluru City Junction	SBC	18:50	19:00	1
Bangalore Cantonment	BNC	19:11	19:12	1
Karmelaram	CRLM	19:29	19:30	1
Hosur	HSRA	19:58	20:00	1
Dharmapuri	DPJ	21:28	21:30	1
Salem Junction	SA	23:42	23:45	1
Erode Junction	ED	00:50	01:00	2
Pugalur	PGR	01:39	01:40	2
Karur Junction	KRR	01:58	02:00	2
Kulithalai	KLT	02:39	02:40	2
Tiruchchirappalli Junction	TPJ	04:00	04:10	2
Thiruverumbur	TRB	04:28	04:29	2
Budalur	BAL	04:44	04:45	2
Thanjavur Junction	TJ	05:03	05:05	2
Papanasam	PML	05:25	05:26	2
Kumbakonam	KMU	05:38	05:40	2
Aduthurai	ADT	05:50	05:51	2
Kutralam	KTM	06:02	06:03	2
Mayiladuthurai Junction	MV	06:50	06:55	2
Sirkazhi	SY	07:13	07:14	2
Chidambaram	CDM	07:31	07:32	2
Cuddalore Port Junction	CUPJ	08:40	DEST	2

== See also ==
- Mysore - Thoothukudi Express
- Karnataka Express
- Wodeyar Express
