= Kumbalgodu =

Coordinates: 12.879892°N 77.446465°E

- town
- Interactive map of Kumbalgodu
- Country: India
- State: Karnataka
- District: Bengaluru Urban
- Metro: Bengaluru South

Population (2011)
  - Total: 10,178

Languages
  - Official: Kannada
- Time zone: UTC+5:30 (IST)
- PIN: 560 074
- Vehicle registration: KA-41

Kumbalgodu (also spelled as Kumbalagodu) is a town located on the outskirts of the Indian city of Bengaluru.

== Etymology ==
The name Kumbalgodu is derived from two Kannada words, 'Kumbala/Kumbla' (ಕುಂಭಳ / ಕುಂಬ್ಲ) which refers to the Ash Gourd (a species of vine) or in some usages a small pond/tank and 'Godu' (ಗೋಡು) which means settlement, hamlet, or boundary. Put together, Kumbalgodu could mean “the settlement where ash gourds grew abundantly” or “a hamlet near the pond/tank”.

== Location ==
It is situated along the Mysore Road between Kengeri and Bidadi, and, according to the 2011 census, has a population of over 10,000.
