= Eshwara Temple, Kengeri, Bengaluru =

Eshwara Temple

Religion
- Affiliation: Hinduism
- District: Bangalore
- Deity: Lord Shiva

Location
- Location: Bangalore
- State: Karnataka
- Country: India
- Interactive map of Eshwara Temple

Eshwara Temple is a Hindu temple in Kengeri, Bangalore, dedicated to the Lord Shiva. Dates back to the Chola king Rajendra Chola's Period (1050 AD).

It is one of Chola Era Temples in Bangalore.

Eshwara Temple is called as Prasanna Someswara Temple and is located near to Kote Anjaneya Swamy Temple in Kengeri.
