= Ullalu =

- Suburb
- Country: India
- State: Karnataka
- District: Bangalore Urban
- Talukas: Bangalore North

Government
  - Type: City Corporation
  - Body: Bruhat Bengaluru Mahanagara Palike

Population (2001)
  - Total: 6,851

Languages
  - Official: Kannada
- Time zone: UTC+5:30 (IST)
- PIN: 560056,560110
- ISO 3166 code: IN-KA
- Vehicle registration: KA41
- Website: karnataka.gov.in

Ullalu is a western suburb of Bangalore in the southern state of Karnataka, India. It is in the Bangalore North taluk of Bangalore Urban district in Karnataka. As of 2001 India census, Ullalu had a population of 6851 with 3539 males and 3312 females.
