= Mysuru–Tuticorin Express =

Daily train

Mysuru - Tuticorin Express
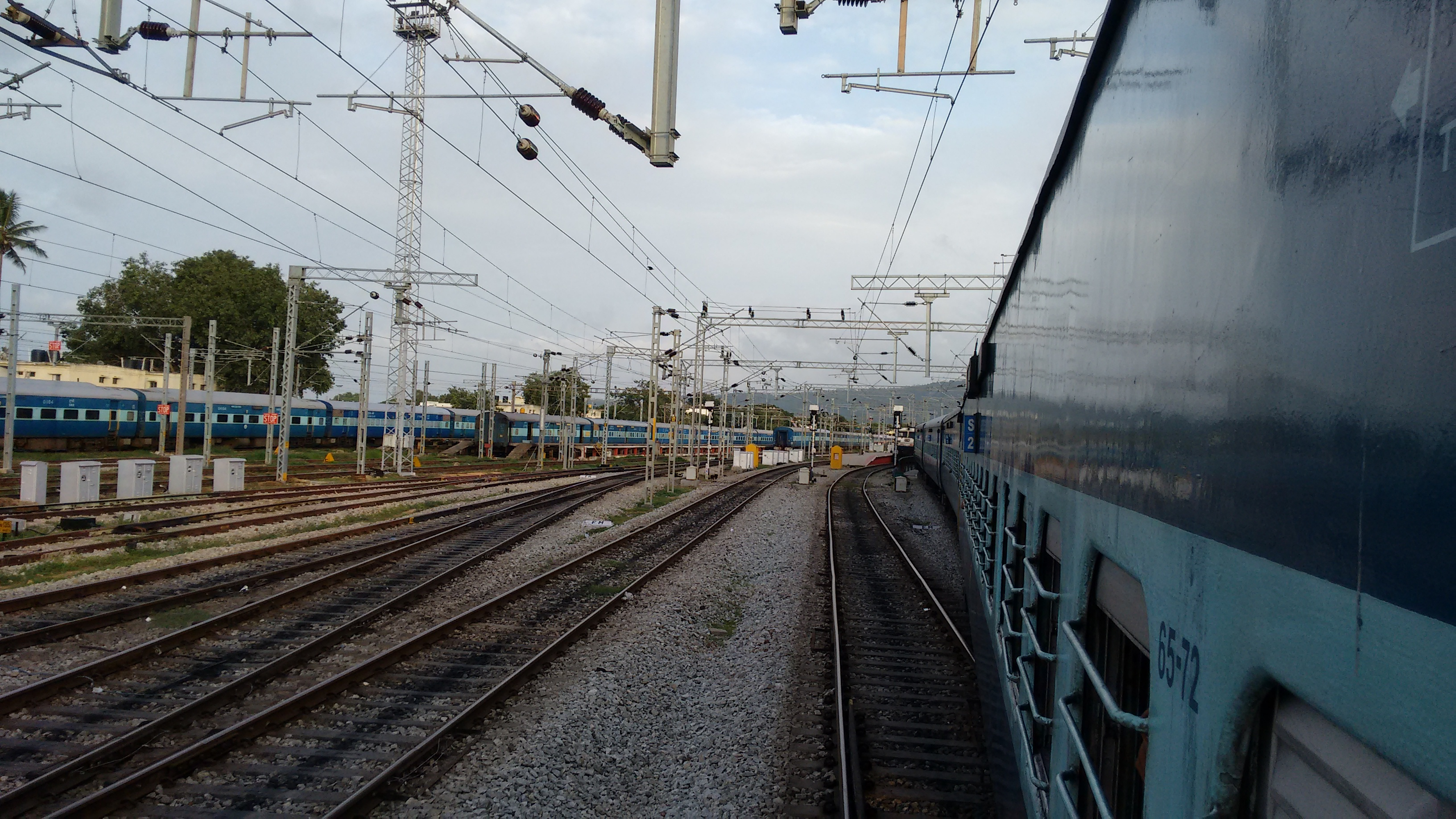
- Mysuru–Tuticorin Express exits Mysore towards North heading towards Tuticorin

Overview
- Service type: Mail/Express
- Status: Active
- Locale: Karnataka & Tamil Nadu
- First service: Fri Aug 01, 1997
- Current operator: South Western Railway zone

Route
- Termini: Mysuru Junction (MYS); Tuticorin (TN)
- Stops: 28
- Distance travelled: 776 km (482 mi)
- Average journey time: 17 Hours 05 Min
- Service frequency: Daily
- Train number: 16235/16236

On-board services
- Classes: 2 A/C, 3 A/C, SL, 2S & EOG
- Disabled access: Disabled access
- Seating arrangements: Yes (Un-Reserved Compartment)
- Sleeping arrangements: Yes (Berth)
- Catering facilities: No
- Observation facilities: Large windows
- Entertainment facilities: Yes

Technical
- Rolling stock: WAP-7 and WAG-9 Locomotive from Krishnarajapuram, Electric Shed (Mysuru - Tuticorin)
- Track gauge: 1,676 mm (5 ft 6 in)
- Electrification: 25 kV AC, 50 Hz (High Voltage Traction)
- Operating speed: 52 km/h (32 mph) average with halts
- Rake maintenance: Tuticorin
- Rake sharing: Mysore-Mayiladuthurai Express, Tiruchchirappalli - Mayiladuthurai Express
Route map
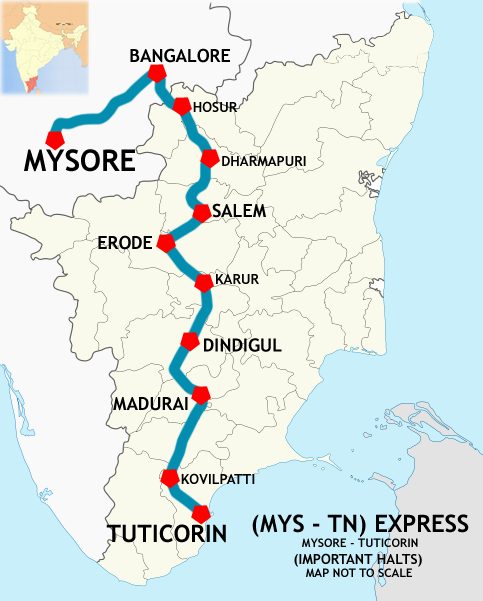

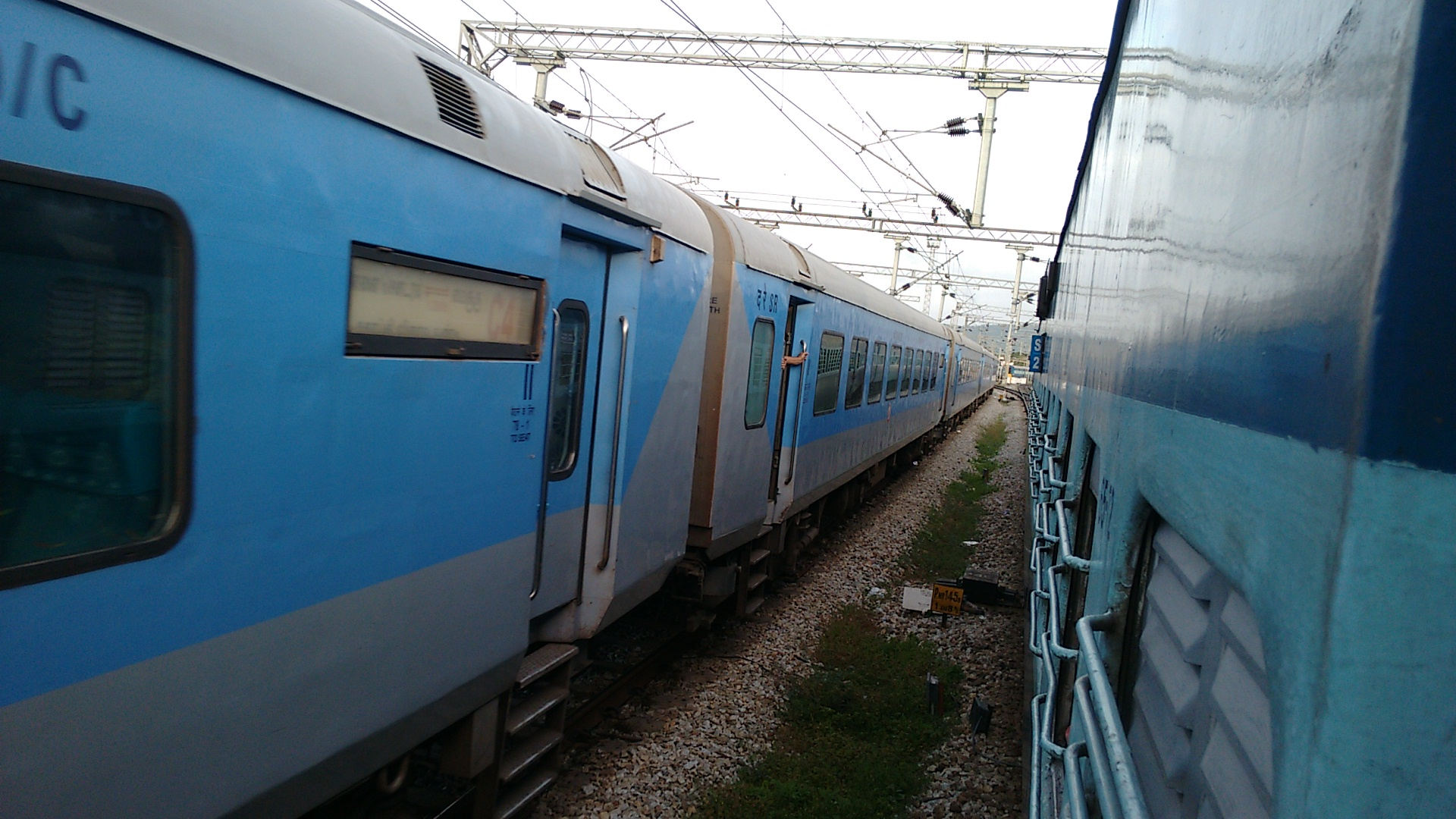
Chennai Central–Mysore Shatabdi Express xing with Mysuru–Tuticorin Express near Mysore railway station

Mysuru–Thoothukudi Express is a daily train service between the cities of Mysore and Thoothukudi operated by the South Western Railway.

== Introduction ==
This train connects the Palace City Mysuru in Karnataka with the Pearl City, Thoothukudi in Tamil Nadu. The train initially operated from Madurai to Bengaluru before being extended to Tuticorin, after that it extended from Bengaluru to Mysuru. Then the train belonged to the Southern Railway and hence is numbered as 16731/16732. Now it's renumbered to 16235/16236 so now it's operated by South Western Railway. It's one of the highly patronized trains of Mysuru division in South Western Railway.There is a constant demand from south tamilnadu people to divert this train through Salem - Namakkal - Karur line for reduce the travel time and also the fare.

== Coach composition ==
| Loco | 1 | 2 | 3 | 4 | 5 | 6 | 7 | 8 | 9 | 10 | 11 | 12 | 13 | 14 | 15 | 16 | 17 | 18 | 19 | 20 | 21 | EOG | GS | GS | S13 | S12 | S11 | S10 | S9 | S8 | S7 | S6 | S5 | S4 | S3 | S2 | S1 | B3 | B2 | B1 | A1 | EOG |

== Rakes sharing ==
Tiruchirappalli-Mayiladuthurai Express & Mysore-Mayiladuthurai Express

== Traction ==
earlier was WDP-4D now WAG-9 and WAP 7 will pull this train end to end
