= Carmelaram =

Suburb of Bangalore, Karnataka, India

Carmelaram is a suburb of Bangalore situated at Varthur Hobli, Sarjapur road. Carmelaram was a village but is now a part of Bruhat Bengaluru Mahanagara Palike.

== History ==
Originally Carmelite Priests ( OCD Fathers) from Kerala bought land and constructed a Theology College in Carmelaram ( Carmelaram Theology College ) in 1969. They called this area Carmelaram, meaning Garden of Carmel. This Institution is the Pioneer institution in Carmelaram. Later many institutions came around and started their training centres. In 2019 Carmelaram Theology College celebrated Golden Jubilee of its foundation. Recently, due to the IT boom it has become part of city.

== Location ==
World / India / Karnataka / Krishnarajapuram, 8 km from center, Coordinates: 12°54′3″N 77°42′56″E. Carmelaram.

== Administration ==
MLA Constituency: Mahadevapura

MP Constituency : Bangalore Central

BBMP Ward Name: Varthur

BBMP Ward Number: 149

MLA: Manjula Aravinda Limbavalli (B.J.P), MP: P C Mohan (B.J.P)

== Transport ==
=== Road ===
Carmelaram is located approximately 11km from Electronic City on the National Highway 7 (NH-7) connecting it with Bangalore and Salem.

Following are the Direct BMTC buses to Carmelaram Railway Gate:

- 342(KR Market to Sarjapur)
- G2(Mayo Hall to Sarjapur)

=== Rail ===
Carmelaram has a railway station located on the Bengaluru-Salem railway line and falls under the Bengaluru Division of the South Western Railway. Trains going to major cities in Tamil Nadu and Kerala halt here, including the 12677/78 Bangalore City-Ernakulam Intercity express, which has the destination of Kochi via Coimbatore, Palakkad, and Thrissur, the 16527/28 Yesvantpur-Kannur Express, which passes via Kozhikode, as well as Coimbatore and Palakkad. 16236 Mysuru-Tuticorin express halts at Madurai. Passenger trains going to Hosur, Dharmapuri and Salem also halt. There are two trains to Mysore.

== The major IT Parks ==
RGA tech park

This project is developed on a land parcel of 18 Acres and is fully functional. This project has a potential development size of 2.1 million sq ft of Grade A office space. Sarjapur Main road is destined to be the new micro-market in Bangalore with close proximity to the Outer Ring Road (IT Hub of Bangalore) and is well connected to other parts of the city. The location is well connected by public transport.

Major Cinema theater near Carmelaram

- Galaxy Paradise - Bommanahalli : 12 km.
- Whitefield Forum Neighbourhood Mall:8 km.
- Innovative-multiplex-marathahalli :8 km.
- PVR Cinemas, Central Mall Belandur
