= 1944 Birthday Honours =

British government recognitions

The 1944 King's Birthday Honours, celebrating the official birthday of King George VI, were announced on 2 June 1944 for the United Kingdom and British Empire, New Zealand, and South Africa.

The recipients of honours are displayed here as they were styled before their new honour, and arranged by honour, with classes (Knight, Knight Grand Cross, etc.) and then divisions (Military, Civil, etc.) as appropriate.

== United Kingdom and British Empire ==
=== Earl ===
- The Right Honourable Edward Frederick Lindley, Viscount Halifax, KG, GCSI, GCIE, TD, HM Ambassador Extraordinary and Plenipotentiary at Washington.

=== Baron ===
- Sir Claud Schuster, GCB, CVO, KC, Clerk of the Crown in Chancery and Permanent Secretary to the Lord Chancellor.

=== Privy Councillor ===
- James Chuter Ede, JP, DL, MP, Parliamentary Secretary, Board of Education, since 1940. Member of Parliament for Mitcham, March–November, 1923; for South Shields, 1929–31, and since 1935.
- The Honourable Francis Michael Forde, Deputy Prime Minister and Minister for the Army in the Commonwealth of Australia.

=== Baronet ===
- William Whytehead Boulton, DL, MP, Vice-Chamberlain of HM Household since March 1942. A Lord Commissioner of HM Treasury, 1940–42. Member of Parliament for Sheffield Central Division since 1931.

=== Knight Bachelor ===
- Robert Reid Bannatyne, CB, Assistant Under-Secretary of State, Home Office.
- Major Jack Becke, CBE, Chief Constable of Cheshire.
- Ernest Edward Bird. For services as President of the Council of The Law Society.
- John Secular Buchanan, CBE, Assistant Chief Executive, Ministry of Aircraft Production.
- Ernest Rock Carling, MB, FRCS, Consultant Adviser in Surgery and Adviser on Casualty Services to the Ministries of Health and Home Security.
- Air Commodore John Adrian Chamier, CB, CMG, DSO, OBE, Executive-Controller of the Air League of the British Empire. Formerly Commandant of the Air Training Corps.
- Alfred William Clapham, CBE, FBA, Secretary, Royal Commission on Historical Monuments. Lately President of the Royal Society of Antiquaries.
- William Henry Collins. For services to hospitals. Chairman of King Edward VII Hospital, Windsor.
- Alwyn Douglas Crow, CBE, ScD, Controller of Projectile Development, Ministry of Supply.
- William Allen Daley, MD, FRCP, DPH, Medical Officer of Health and School Medical Officer, London County Council.
- William Llewelyn Davies, Librarian of the National Library of Wales.
- Colonel Arthur Evans, MP, Member of Parliament for Leicester East Division, 1922–23, and for Cardiff South Division, 1924–29, and since 1931. For political and public services.
- Professor Alexander Fleming, MB, BS, FRCS, FRCP, FRS, Professor of Bacteriology, University of London. Discoverer of Penicillin.
- Professor Howard Walter Florey, MB, PhD, FRS, Professor of Pathology, University of Oxford. For services in the development of Penicillin.
- Percival Hartley, CBE, MC, DSc, FRS, Director of Biological Standards, National Institute for Medical Research.
- Wing-Commander Eric John Hodsoll, CB, Inspector-General of Civil Defence, Ministry of Home Security.
- Hubert Stanley Houldsworth, KC, DSc, JP, Controller-General, Ministry of Fuel and Power.
- Peter David Innes, CBE, MA, DSc, Chief Education Officer, Birmingham.
- Lieutenant-Colonel John Alexander Dunnington-Jefferson, DSO, Chairman of the East Riding War Agricultural Executive Committee.
- Lewis Jones, JP, MP, Parliamentary Charity Commissioner since 1937. Member of Parliament for Swansea West Division since 1931. For political and public services.
- Alexander Boyne King, CBE, JP, chairman, Scottish Advisory Committee, Ministry of Information.
- Mark Frank Lindley, CB, LLD, Comptroller-General, Patent Office.
- Albert Nöel Campbell Macklin, managing director, Fairmile Marine Co.
- Simon Marks, DSc, chairman and managing director, Marks & Spencer Ltd.
- Harry Finlayson Methven, Director of the National Service Hostels Corporation, Ltd.
- Eustace James Missenden, OBE, General Manager, Southern Railway Co.
- Alfred James Munnings, President of the Royal Academy.
- John William Lambton Oliver, CB, CBE, Deputy Director-General, Equipment and Stores, Ministry of Supply.
- Charles Herbert Reilly, OBE, LLD, FRIBA, Emeritus Professor of Architecture, University of Liverpool.
- Alexander Rowland Smith, managing director and Controller, Ford Motor Co. Ltd.
- Charles Aubrey Smith, CBE, Actor. A leading Member of the British community in California.
- Llewellyn Thomas Gordon Soulsby, Regional Director, Merchant Shipbuilding and Repairs, Admiralty.
- Professor Geoffrey Ingram Taylor, FRS, Yarrow Research Professor of the Royal Society.
- Captain Ernest Hugh Thornton, RD, RNR, (Retd), Commodore of the Union Castle Line Fleet.
- William Wavell Wakefield, MP, Member of Parliament for Swindon since 1935. For political and public services.
- Alexander Percival Waterfield, CB, First Commissioner, Civil Service Commission.
- George Alexander Waters, LLD, JP, Editor of The Scotsman.
- Garnet Douglas Wilson, Lord Provost of Dundee.
- Major Alfred Chad Turner Woodward, MB, ChB, FRCS, JP, Chairman of the Worcestershire County Council.
- Herbert Wragg, JP, MP, Member of Parliament for Belper, 1923–29, and since 1931. For political and public services.

Dominions

- The Honourable Robert James Hudson, CMG, MC, Chief Justice of Southern Rhodesia.

India

- The Honourable Mr. Justice Machraj Bhawani Shanker Niyogi, CIE, LLD, Puisne Judge of the High Court of Judicature at Nagpur, Central Provinces and Berar.
- Charles Holditch Bristow, CIE, Indian Civil Service, Adviser to His Excellency the Governor of Bombay.
- Henry Challen Greenfield, CSI, CIE, Indian Civil Service, Adviser to His Excellency the Governor of the Central Provinces and Berar.
- Lakshmipati Misra, Member, Engineering, Railway Board, Government of India.
- The Honourable Sardar Bahadur Sardar Sobha Singh, OBE, Member of the Council of State, Delhi.
- The Honourable Mr. John Henry Burder, Member of the Council of State, Senior Partner, Messrs. Jardine, Skinner & Co., President, Bengal Chamber of Commerce and Associated Chambers of Commerce, India.
- Keith Cantlie, CIE, Indian Civil Service, Member, Assam Revenue Tribunal, Assam.
- Rai Bahadur Seth Bhagchand Soni, OBE, Member, Legislative Assembly (Central), Proprietor, Banking and Industrial firm of Seth Joharmal Gumbhirmal, Ajmer.
- Dhirendra Nath Mitra, CBE, Solicitor to the Government of India.
- Charles Edward Stuart Fairweather, CIE, Indian Police, Commissioner of Police (Retd), Calcutta, Bengal.
- Godfrey George Armstrong, OBE, MC, VD, chairman, Madras Port Trust, Madras.
- Gangaram Kaula, CIE, Mushir-i-Khas, Jind State.
- Sri Diwan Bahadur Madura Balasundaram Nayudu, CIE, Merchant, Madras.
- James Nuttall, Director, Messrs. Binny & Co. (Madras) Ltd., Madras.

Colonies, Protectorates, Etc.

- James Reginald Conyers, CBE. For public services in Bermuda.
- William James Fitzgerald, MC, Colonial Legal Service, Chief Justice, Palestine.
- Tikiri Banda Panabokke. For public services in Ceylon.
- Claud Ramsay Wilmot Seton, MC, Colonial Legal Service, Chief Justice, Nyasaland.
- Gerald Charles Whiteley, CMG, Colonial Administrative Service, Chief Commissioner, Western Provinces, Nigeria.

=== Order of the Bath ===
==== Knight Grand Cross of the Order of the Bath (GCB) ====
Military Division

- General Sir Henry Maitland Wilson, GBE, KCB, DSO, (17547), Colonel Commandant, The Rifle Brigade (Prince Consort's Own), Aide-de-Camp General to The King.

==== Knight Commander of the Order of the Bath (KCB) ====
Military Division

Royal Navy

- Vice-Admiral Sir Harold Martin Burrough, KBE, CB, DSO.
- Vice-Admiral Henry Bernard Rawlings, CB, OBE.
- Vice-Admiral Louis Henry Keppel Hamilton, CB, DSO.

Army

- Major-General (temporary Lieutenant-General) Edmond Charles Acton Schreiber, CB, DSO, (12846), late Royal Artillery.
- Major-General (temporary Lieutenant-General) James Andrew Harcourt Gammell, CB, DSO, MC, (8402), late The Queen's Own Cameron Highlanders.
- Major-General (temporary Lieutenant-General) John George des Reaux Swayne, CB, CBE, (17966), late The Somerset Light Infantry (Prince Albert's).
- General Ashton Gerard Oswald Mosley Mayne, CB, CBE, DSO, (23034), Indian Army.

Royal Air Force

- Acting Air Marshal Norman Howard Bottomley, CB, CIE, DSO, AFC.
- Acting Air Marshal Ralph Squire Sorley, CB, OBE, DSC, DFC.

Civil Division

- Ernest Holloway, CB, OBE, Director-General of Works, Air Ministry.
- The Right Honourable Sir Alan Frederick Lascelles, KCVO, CB, CMG, MC, Private Secretary to The King.
- Sir Walter Hamilton Moberly, DSO, DLitt, chairman, University Grants Committee.
- Sir David Taylor Monteath, KCMG, CB, CVO, OBE, Permanent Under-Secretary of State, India Office.

==== Companion of the Order of the Bath (CB) ====
Military Division

Royal Navy

- Vice-Admiral Edward de Faye Renouf, CVO (Retd).
- Rear-Admiral Richard James Rodney Scott, AM (Retd).
- Rear-Admiral Sir Philip Louis Vian, KBE, DSO.
- Rear-Admiral Arthur Duncan Read.
- Rear-Admiral Henry Clarmont Phillips.
- Rear-Admiral John Hereward Edelsten, CBE.
- Engineer Rear-Admiral Réné Charles Hugill, MVO, OBE (Retd).
- Paymaster Captain Roger Ernest Worthington, DSC, ADC.

Army

- Major-General Albert Edward Macrae, OBE, (3457), late Royal Artillery.
- Major-General Horace Eckford Roome, CBE, MC, (4182), late Royal Engineers.
- Major-General (local Lieutenant-General) Gordon Wilson, CBE, MC, MB, KHS, (26291), late Royal Army Medical Corps.
- Major-General Gilbert Alan Blake, MB, KHS, (4799), late Royal Army Medical Corps.
- Colonel (temporary Major-General) Charles George Phillips, DSO, MC, (4431), late The West Yorkshire Regiment (The Prince of Wales's Own).
- Colonel (temporary Major-General) Clement Arthur West, DSO, MC, (5397), late Royal Engineers.
- Colonel (temporary Major-General) Kenneth Noel Crawford, MC, (10226), late Royal Engineers.
- Colonel (temporary Major-General) Donald Jay McMullen, CBE, DSO, MIMechE, (22933), late Royal Engineers.
- Colonel (temporary Major-General) John Albert Charles Whitaker, CBE, (11783), late Coldstream Guards.
- Colonel (temporary Major-General) Philip Henry Mitchiner, CBE, TD, MD, MS, FRCS, KHS, (2162), late Royal Army Medical Corps (Territorial Army).
- Colonel (temporary Major-General) Nevil Charles Dowell Brownjohn, OBE, MC, (11450), late Royal Engineers.
- Colonel (temporary Major-General) Roger Clayton Reynolds, OBE, MC, (8468), late Royal Artillery.
- Colonel (temporary Major-General) Charles Alexander Phipps Murison, CBE, MC, (21180), late Royal Artillery.
- Colonel (temporary Major-General) Reginald Francis Stewart Denning, (59630), late The Bedfordshire and Hertfordshire Regiment.
- Colonel (temporary Brigadier) Edward Ian Claud Jacob, CBE, BA, (15845), late Royal Engineers.
- Honorary Brigadier Vincent Raymond Kenny, MBE, (181986), late Royal Engineers.
- Major-General Arthur Verney Hammond, DSO, (85999), Indian Army.
- Major-General John Geoffrey Bruce, DSO, MC, (106232), Indian Army.
- Colonel (temporary Major-General) Roland Richardson, MC, (147396), Indian Army.
- Colonel (temporary Major-General) Alfred Cyril Curtis, DSO, MC, (153819), Indian Army.

Royal Air Force

- Air Vice-Marshal Richard Harrison, CBE, DFC, AFC.
- Air Vice-Marshal Ephraim William Havers, CBE.
- Air Vice-Marshal Oswyn George William Gifford Lywood, CBE.
- Air Vice-Marshal Bernard McEntegart, CBE.
- Air Vice-Marshal Reginald Baynes Mansell, CBE.
- Air Vice-Marshal Arthur Penrose Martyn Sanders, CBE.
- Acting Air Vice-Marshal Donald Clifford Tyndall Bennett, CBE, DSO.
- Acting Air Vice-Marshal William Charles Coleman Gell, DSO, MC, Auxiliary Air Force.
- Acting Air Vice-Marshal Edwin Spencer Goodwin, CBE, AFC.
- Acting Air Vice-Marshal Victor Emmanuel Groom, OBE, DFC.
- Acting Air Vice-Marshal Sturley Philip Simpson, CBE, MC.
- Air Commodore George Cyril Bailey, DSO.
- Air Commodore John Nelson Boothman, AFC.
- Air Commodore Alexander Gray, MC.
- Air Commodore Harold Melsome Probyn, CBE, DSO.
- Acting Air Commodore George Robert Beamish, CBE, ADC.
- Acting Air Commodore Stanford Cade, FRCS, MRCP.

Civil Division

- Major Charles Henry Scott Plummer, President, Territorial Army Association of the County of Selkirk.
- Colonel Robert Chapman, CMG, DSO, TD, DL, chairman, Territorial Army and Air Force Association of the County of Durham.
- Brevet Colonel Harold Septimus Burn, MC, TD, DL, chairman, Territorial Army Association of the County of Carmarthen.
- Air Commodore (Hon.) Vernon Sidney Brown, OBE, Chief Inspector of Accidents, Air Ministry.
- Oswald Coleman Allen, CBE, Under-secretary, Acting Deputy Secretary, Ministry of Home Security.
- Stanley Paul Chambers, CIE, Commissioner of Inland Revenue.
- Ralph Roscoe Enfield, Principal Assistant Secretary, Ministry of Agriculture and Fisheries.
- Reginald Daniel Fennelly, Under Secretary, Ministry of Production.
- Herbert Horace George, MC, Principal Assistant Secretary and Accountant General, Ministry of Health.
- Charles Lawrence Kinloch Peel, Principal Assistant Secretary, General Post Office.
- George Lionel Pepler, FSI, ARIBA, Principal Assistant Secretary, Ministry of Town and Country Planning.
- Professor Lionel Charles Robbins, FBA, Director of the Economic Section of the War Cabinet Secretariat.
- Harry Bernard Wallis, Principal Assistant Secretary, Board of Education.
- Richmond Walton, Acting Deputy Secretary, Admiralty.

=== Order of Merit (OM) ===
- The Right Honourable Sidney James, Baron Passfield, LLB, LittD.
- Sir Henry Hallett Dale, GBE, FRS, MA, MD, DSc, LLD, FRCP, President of the Royal Society.
- Sir Giles Gilbert Scott, RA.

=== Order of the Star of India ===
==== Knight Commander of the Order of the Star of India (KCSI) ====
- Henry Foley Knight, CSI, CIE, Indian Civil Service, Adviser to His Excellency the Governor of Bombay.

==== Companion of the Order of the Star of India (CSI) ====
- Yeshwant Anant Godbole, CIE, Indian Civil Service, Adviser to His Excellency the Governor, of Bihar.
- Harold Samuel Eaton Stevens, CIE, MC, Indian Civil Service, Food and Civil Supplies Commissioner, Bengal.
- Colonel (Temporary Major-General) William Corson Holden, CBE, DSO, MC, British Service, Deputy Chief of the General Staff, General Headquarters, India.
- Charles Gordon Herbert, CIE, Indian Political Service, Resident at Gwalior and for the States of Rampur and Benares.

=== Order of Saint Michael and Saint George ===
==== Knight Grand Cross of the Order of St Michael and St George (GCMG) ====
- Sir Eric Teichman, KCMG, CIE, until recently Chinese Adviser to His Majesty's Embassy at Chungking.

==== Knight Commander of the Order of St Michael and St George (KCMG) ====
- Professor Reginald Coupland, CIE, DLitt, Beit Professor of Colonial History, University of Oxford.
- Percivale Liesching, CMG, Second Secretary, Board of Trade.
- The Honourable Sir William Henry Horwood, Chief Justice of Newfoundland.
- Laurence Collier, CMG, His Majesty's Ambassador Extraordinary and Plenipotentiary to His Majesty the King of Norway.
- Donald St. Clair Gainer, CMG, OBE, His Majesty's Ambassador Extraordinary and Plenipotentiary to the United States of Brazil (dated 31 May 1944).
- William Thomas Matthews, CB, OBE, Director-General of the Middle East Relief and Rehabilitation Administration.
- Paymaster-Commander Edward Wilfred Harry Travis, CBE, Royal Navy, Director of a Department of the Foreign Office.

==== Companion of the Order of St Michael and St George (CMG) ====
- Alexander McCulloch Campbell, lately representative of the Ministry of War Transport in South Africa.
- John Henry Hambro, a managing director, United Kingdom Commercial Corporation.
- Maurice Inglis Hutton, Principal Assistant Secretary, Ministry of Food;for services with the British Food Mission to the United States of America.
- The Honourable John Scott Maclay, MP, for services with the British Merchant Shipping Mission, Washington.
- Richard John Rupert Measham, OBE, Director of Postal Services, General Post Office (now Regional Director in Scotland).
- Charles Buxton Anderson, ISO, MInstCE, MIEA, Railways Commissioner for the State of South Australia.
- Lieutenant-Colonel Aubrey Denzil Forsyth Thompson, CBE, Resident Commissioner of the Bechuanaland Protectorate.
- Geoffrey Miles Clifford, OBE, ED, Colonial Administrative Service, Colonial Secretary, Gibraltar.
- Christopher William Machell Cox, Adviser on Education to the Secretary of State for the Colonies.
- Launcelot William Gregory Eccles, MC, Colonial Survey Service, Commissioner for Lands, Mines and Surveys, Northern Rhodesia.
- John James Emberton, MC, Colonial Administrative Service, Senior Resident, Nigeria.
- Joseph Burtt Hutchinson, Geneticist, Cotton Research Station, Trinidad, and Cotton Adviser to the Comptroller for Development and Welfare in the West Indies.
- Alfred Travers Lacey, OBE, Colonial Education Service, Director of Education, Kenya.
- Robert Springett Mackilligan, OBE, MC, Inspector of Mines and Petroleum Technologist, Trinidad.
- Ralph William Richardson Miller, AIC, Colonial Agricultural Service, Director of Agriculture and Sisal Controller, Tanganyika Territory.
- Andre Espitalier-Noel, Controller of Supplies, Mauritius.
- John Gordon Read, Colonial Administrative Service, Provincial Commissioner, Northern Rhodesia.
- George Frederick Steel, Assistant Secretary, Colonial Office.
- Philip Mainwaring Broadmead, MC, Counsellor at His Majesty's Embassy at Rio de Janeiro.
- Frederick George Coultas, one of His Majesty's Consuls.
- Robert Dunbar, MC, Head of the Treaty Department of the Foreign Office.
- Professor Robert Allason Furness, CBE, Deputy Public Censor, Anglo-Egyptian Censorship.
- Douglas Frederick Howard, MC, Head of the Southern Department of the Foreign Office.
- Redvers Opie, Economic Adviser to His Majesty's Embassy at Washington.
- Jose Campbell Penney, OBE, MC, Commissioner of Police and Prisons, Sudan Government.
- Alec Walter George Randall, OBE, Head of the Refugee Department of the Foreign Office.
- Robert William Urquhart, OBE, His Majesty's Consul-General at New Orleans.

=== Order of the Indian Empire ===
==== Knight Grand Commander of the Order of the Indian Empire (GCIE) ====
- Major His Highness Alijah Farzand-I-Dilpazir-I-Daulat-I-Inglishia Mukhlis-ud-Daula Nasir-ul-Mulk Amir-ul-Umara Nawab Sir Saiyid Raza Ali Khan Bahadur Musta'id Jang, KCSI, LLD, DLitt, Nawab of Rampur.

==== Knight Commander of the Order of the Indian Empire (KCIE) ====
- Robert Francis Mudie, CSI, CIE, OBE, Indian Civil Service, lately Acting Governor of Bihar.
- Cyril Edgar Jones, CSI, CIE, Indian Civil Service, Secretary to the Government of India in the Finance Department.
- Lieutenant-Colonel George Van Baerle Gillan, CIE, Indian Political Service, Resident for Rajputana.
- Lieutenant-General William Henry Goldney Baker, CB, DSO, OBE, Indian Army, lately Adjutant-General in India.
- Lieutenant-General Thomas Jacomb Hutton, CB, MC, Secretary, War Resources, and Reconstruction Committees of Council, Government of India.
- Muhammad Saleh Akbar Hydari, CSI, CIE, Indian Civil Service, Secretary to the Government of India in the Department of Industries and Civil Supplies.
- James Drummond Anderson, CIE, Indian Civil Service, Financial Commissioner, Revenue, and Secretary to Government, Revenue Department, Punjab.

==== Companion of the Order of the Indian Empire (CIE) ====
- Mullath Kadingi Vellodi, Indian Civil Service, Textile Commissisoner, and ex-officio Joint Secretary to the Government of India in the Department of Industries and Civil Supplies.
- Prem Nath Thapar, Indian Civil Service, Joint Secretary to the Government of India in the Department of Information and Broadcasting.
- Lieutenant-Colonel Robert Richardson Burnett, OBE, Indian Political Service, Joint Secretary to the Government of India tin the External Affairs Department.
- Colonel (Temporary Major-General) Fred Buckley, Indian Army, Commander, Waziristan District.
- Henry Mend Mathews, AMIEE, Electrical Commissioner with the Government of India.
- Lieutenant-Colonel Cosmo Grant Niven Edwards, Indian Political Service, Resident for Kolhapur and the Deccan States.
- Edward Owen Lee, Indian Civil Service, Commissioner, Bhagalpur Division, Bhagalpur, Bihar.
- Brigadier Mathew Henry Cox, OBE, MC, Deputy Director-General, Ordnance Factories Division, Department of Supply, Government of India.
- Colonel (Temporary Brigadier) Arthur Douglas Magnay, Indian Army, lately Commander, Allahabad Area.
- Colonel (Temporary Brigadier) Lionel Arthur Stuart, MC, Indian Army, lately Director, Pay and Pensions, General Headquarters (India).
- Lieutenant-Colonel Alfred William Nicholls, OBE, Royal Indian Army Service Corps, lately Director of Movements, General Headquarters, India.
- Lieutenant (War Substantive Lieutenant-Colonel) (Temporary Brigadier) Ivor Stewart Jehu, Indian Army (Emergency Commission), Director, Inter-Services Public Relations. General Headquarters, India.
- Frank Fraser Haigh, Indian Service of Engineers, Chief Engineer and Secretary to Government, Public Works Department, Irrigation Branch, Punjab.
- Charles Frederick Victor Williams, Indian Civil Service, Secretary to the Government of Madras, Home Department.
- Ali Ahmed, Indian Service of Engineers, Chief Engineer, Public Works Department and Secretary to the Government of Assam.
- William Gerald Came, Indian Service of Engineers, Chief Engineer and Secretary to Government, Public Works Department, Bihar.
- Edgar William Holland, Indian Civil Service, Secretary, Public Health and Local Self-Government Department, Bengal.
- Sukumar Basu, OBE, Indian Civil Service, Secretary to the Government of Bengal, Department of Agriculture, and lately Deputy Secretary to the Government of India in the Department of Education, Health and Lands.
- Harold Alexander Reid, Chief Mechanical Engineer, South Indian Railway.
- Pyare Kishan Wattal, Indian Audit and Accounts Service, Accountant-General, Punjab.
- Captain Joseph Noel Metcalfe, OBE, DSC, Royal Indian Navy (Retd), Director of Equipment, Naval Headquarters.
- Ahmed Shah Bokhari, Director-General, All-India Radio.
- Lieutenant-Colonel (local Colonel) Geoffrey Cartaret Strahan, OBE, Indian Army, Recruiting Officer for Gurkhas, Kunraghat.
- Major Frank James Salberg, MBE, VD, Engineer, Dibru-Sadiya Railway, and late Chief Engineer, Assam-Bengal Railway.
- Sydney Thomas Hensman Munsey, Indian Service of Engineers, Chief Engineer to Government, Public Works Department, Irrigation Branch, United Provinces.
- Harold Edwin Butler, OBE, Indian Police, Commissioner of Police, Bombay.
- Elmer Hargreaves Chave, Chief Engineer, Public Works Department (General, Buildings and A.R.P.), Madras.
- Captain (Commodore) Charles Ford Hammill, Royal Navy, Senior Naval Officer, Persian Gulf Division.
- Mahabir Prasad, Indian Service of Engineers (Retd), Additional Chief Engineer to Government, United Provinces.
- Ram Gopal, Indian Audit and Accounts Service, Chief Controller of Supply Accounts, New Delhi.
- Herbert Ludlow Davis, Nautical Adviser to the Government of India, and Additional Controller of Indian Shipping.
- Khan Bahadur Muhammad Azimatullah Khan Sahib Bahadur, Collector and District Magistrate (Retd), Madras.
- Frederick William O'Gorman, OBE, Indian Police, Officiating Deputy Inspector-General of Police, Criminal Investigation Department, Bombay.
- Syed Amjad Ali, OBE, Member, Punjab Legislative Assembly, Lahore, Punjab.
- George Rainald Henniker-Gotley, DSO, Indian Forest Service, Conservator of Forests, North-West Frontier Province.
- Robert George Manson, Deputy General Manager, Bengal & Assam Railway, Bengal.
- Lieutenant-Colonel Herbert Edward Murray, Indian Medical Service, Professor of Midwifery, Medical College, and Superintendent, Medical College Hospitals, Calcutta, Bengal.
- Ivan Ellis Jones, Indian Civil Service, Director of Food Purchases and Deputy Secretary to Government, Punjab (Supplies), and lately Registrar, Co-operative Societies, Lahore, Punjab.
- Robert John Mathison Inglis, MInstCE, Divisional General Manager, London & North-Eastern Railway.
- The Reverend John McKenzie, DD, Principal, Wilson College, Bombay.

=== Royal Victorian Order ===
==== Knight Commander of the Royal Victorian Order (KCVO) ====
- Brigadier Charles Alfred Howard, DSO.
- Owen Frederick Morshead, CVO, DSO, MC.

==== Commander of the Royal Victorian Order (CVO) ====
- Lionel Logue, MVO.

==== Member of the Royal Victorian Order (MVO) ====
At this time the two lowest classes of the Royal Victorian Order were "Member (fourth class)" and "Member (fifth class)", both with post-nominal letters MVO. "Member (fourth class)" was renamed "Lieutenant" (LVO) from the 1985 New Year Honours onwards.

Fourth Class

- Alfred Trego Butler, MC, FSA.
- Henry Bromley Derry, DMus, FRCO.
- Thomas Macpherson Stanier.
- Louis Leopold Victor Wulff.

Fifth Class

- Robert Walter Burbidge.
- George Albert Conyard.
- Percival Thorne Fielding.
- Gwendoline Logan.
- James Arthur Masters.
- Norman Leslie Swift.
- Stanley Arkell Williams.

=== Order of the British Empire ===
==== Dame Grand Cross of the Order of the British Empire (GBE) ====
Civil Division

- Stella, Dowager Marchioness of Reading, DBE, chairman, Women's Voluntary Services for Civil Defence.

==== Dame Commander of the Order of the British Empire (DBE) ====
Military Division

- Doris Winifred Beale, RRC.

Civil Division

- Lilian Charlotte Barker, CBE, JP. For services in connection with the welfare of women and girls.

==== Knight Commander of the Order of the British Empire (KBE) ====
Military Division

Royal Navy

- Vice-Admiral Frank Arthur Marten, CB, CMG, CVO (Retd).
- Vice-Admiral Theodore John Hallett, CB, CBE (Retd).
- Rear-Admiral Aubrey Thomas Tillard, DSO (Retd).
- Rear-Admiral Kenelm Everard Lane Creighton, MVO (Retd).

Army

- Major-General Guy de Courcy Glover, CB, DSO, MC, (1336), late The South Staffordshire Regiment.
- Major-General Claude Francis Liardet, CB, DSO, TD, (7191), late Royal Artillery, Territorial Army.
- Major-General (temporary Lieutenant-General) Archibald Edward Nye, CB, MC, (5851), late The Royal Warwickshire Regiment.

Royal Air Force

- Air Vice-Marshal William Tyrrell, CBE, DSO, MC, MB, BCh, DPH.

Civil Division

- Harold Leslie Boyce, JP, MP, Member of Parliament for Gloucester since 1929. For political and public services.
- Herbert Brittain, CB, Under-Secretary, HM Treasury.
- Thomas Gilmour Jenkins, CB, MC, Deputy Director-General, Ministry of War Transport.
- Lancelot Carrington Royle, chairman, Navy, Army and Air Force Institutes.
- Thomas Herbert Sheepshanks, CB, Deputy Secretary, Ministry of Home Security, seconded to the Office of the Minister of Reconstruction.
- Sir Purshottamdas Thakurdas, CIE, MBE, chairman, East India Cotton Association, Bombay.
- William Marston Logan, CMG, OBE, Governor & Commander-in-Chief, Seychelles.

==== Commander of the Order of the British Empire (CBE) ====
Military Division

Royal Navy

- Acting Rear-Admiral (E) Charles Hepworth Nicholson.
- Temporary Surgeon Rear-Admiral Richard Alun Rowlands, OBE, MD.
- Captain (Commodore Second Class) John Pelham Champion, DSO, (Retd).
- Captain (Commodore Second Class) Daniel de Pass, (Retd).
- Captain Terence Hugh Back.
- Captain Arthur Edgar Buckland, DSO, DSC, (Retd).
- Captain Douglas William O'Bryen Forsyth, (Retd), (Portsmouth).
- Captain Archibald Edward Johnston, (Retd).
- Captain Frederick Thomas de Mallet Morgan, (Retd).
- Captain Richard William Ravenhill, DSC.
- Acting Captain Dudley Vivian Peyton-Ward.
- Constructor Captain Neville Green Holt, Royal Corps of Naval Constructors. (Bath).
- Acting Paymaster Captain John Hugo Benwell Benwell-Lejeune.
- Acting Paymaster Captain Charles Alun Maurice-Jones.
- Colonel Second Commandant (Acting Major-General) Godfrey Edward Wildman-Lushington, Royal Marines.
- The Reverend Robert Reginald Churchill, MA, KHCh, Chaplain.
- Jocelyn May Woollcombe, Superintendent, WRNS.

Army

- Colonel Edward Bruce Allnutt, MC, (10751), late Royal Army Medical Corps.
- Colonel and Chief Paymaster (temporary Brigadier) Henry Genge-Andrews (4200), late Royal Army Pay Corps.
- Lieutenant-Colonel (temporary Brigadier) Henry Bainbridge (26946), Royal Engineers.
- Lieutenant-Colonel (temporary Brigadier) Jocelyn Arthur Barlow (6231), The West Yorkshire Regiment (The Prince of Wales's Own).
- Lieutenant-Colonel (temporary Brigadier) Richard Barrow (17971), Royal Artillery.
- Colonel David Ernest Brand, DSO, TD, DL, Lanarkshire Home Guard.
- Colonel Ernest Telford Brook, London Passenger Transport Home Guard.
- Chief Commander (temporary Controller) Monica Mabel Carlisle (192060), Auxiliary Territorial Service.
- Lieutenant-Colonel (temporary Brigadier) Francis George Clark (3145), Royal Artillery.
- Colonel William John O'Brien Daunt (6161), late The Royal Norfolk Regiment.
- Lieutenant-Colonel (temporary Brigadier) Robert Hugh Pagan Duckworth, MC, (20282), Royal Engineers.
- Lieutenant-Colonel (temporary Brigadier) Frederick George French (164028), Retd., Indian Army.
- Lieutenant-Colonel (temporary Brigadier) William Moring Hayes, OBE, (152959), General List.
- Colonel George Noah Heath, DSO, TD, West Lancashire Home Guard.
- Lieutenant-Colonel (temporary Colonel) (acting Brigadier) Llewelyn Wansbrough-Jones (945), Royal Engineers.
- Lieutenant-Colonel (temporary Brigadier) Brian Charles Hannam Kimmins (1294), Royal Artillery.
- Colonel Walter John Challoner Lake (Vice-Admiral, Royal Navy, Retd), Cambridgeshire Home Guard.
- Lieutenant-Colonel Harry Dunbar Maconochie, MC, (589), Royal Engineers.
- Lieutenant-Colonel (temporary Colonel) (local Brigadier) Grant Massie, MS, FRCS, (128972), Royal Army Medical Corps.
- Chaplain to the Forces 1st Class the Reverend Joseph Henry McKew, MC, MA, KHC, (6555), Royal Army Chaplains Department.
- Colonel (temporary Brigadier) Alan Bruce McPherson, MVO, MC, Indian Army.
- Lieutenant-Colonel (temporary Brigadier) Cecil Bernard Simpson Morley, TD, (32368), Royal Artillery, Territorial Army.
- Colonel (temporary Brigadier) George Leslie Grove Pollard, MBE, AMIEE, (34485), late Royal Corps of Signals.
- Colonel (temporary Brigadier) Neville Phillips Procter, MC, (15639), late The South Lancashire Regiment (The Prince of Wales's Volunteers).
- Colonel, CVO, DSO, MC, (4594), late The Essex Regiment.
- Colonel (temporary Brigadier) Harold Redman (15389), late The King's Own Yorkshire Light Infantry.
- Colonel Frederick Reid, MC, TD, Post Office Home Guard.
- Colonel (temporary Brigadier) Collen Edward Melville Richards, DSO, MC, (5049), late The East Lancashire Regiment.
- Colonel (temporary Major-General) Edmund Hakewill-Smith, MC, (13349), late The Royal Scots Fusiliers.
- Colonel (temporary Brigadier) Alexander Wallace Sproull, BSc, MIMechE, MIEE, (11617), late Royal Engineers.
- Colonel Geoffrey Edward Wingfield-Stratford, MC, (3572), late The Queen's Own Royal West Kent Regiment.
- Colonel Edward Mallalieu Brooke-Taylor, MC, TD, DL, Buxton Home Guard.
- Colonel Alexander Smith Turnham, OBE, (10825), late 10th Royal Hussars (Prince of Wales's Own), Royal Armoured Corps.
- Maior (temporary Lieutenant-Colonel) William Lionel Douglas Veitch, OBE, (17541), Royal Engineers.
- Colonel (local Brigadier) John Murray Weddell, FRCS, (18884), late Royal Army Medical Corps.
- Colonel (temporary Brigadier) John Henry Woods (627), late The Royal Berkshire Regiment (Princess Charlotte of Wales's).
- Colonel (temporary Brigadier) Bertran Combes, Australian Military Forces.
- Brigadier Edward Talbot Rowllings, New Zealand Military Forces.

Royal Air Force

- Acting Air Vice-Marshal Robert Mordaunt Foster, DFC.
- Acting Air Vice-Marshal Francis Frederic Inglis.
- Acting Air Vice-Marshal Cedric Ernest Victor Porter.
- Air Commodore Thomas Geoffrey Bowler.
- Air Commodore Oliver Eric Carter, AFC.
- Air Commodore Kenneth Brian Boyd Cross, DSO, DFC.
- Air Commodore Henry George Crowe, MC.
- Air Commodore Thomas Fawdry, OBE.
- Air Commodore Raymund George Hart, OBE, MC.
- Air Commodore Andrew MacGregor, MBE, DFC.
- Air Commodore Harold Jace Roach, OBE, AFC.
- Air Commodore Cecil Alfred Stevens, MC.
- Air Commodore Frank Noel Trinder.
- Air Commodore Thomas Arthur Warne-Browne, DSC.
- Air Commodore Hugh Granville White.
- Acting Air Commodore Clayton Descoue Clement Boyce.
- Acting Air Commodore Hugh Alex Constantine, DSO.
- Acting Air Commodore Leslie Dalton-Morris.
- Acting Air Commodore John Swire Griffiths.
- Acting Air Commodore Thomas Geoffrey Pike, DFC.
- Acting Air Commodore Whitney Willard Straight, MC, DFC, Auxiliary Air Force.
- Group Captain Montague Cecil Collins.
- Group Captain Albert Edward Dark.
- Group Captain James Clement Foden, AFC.
- Group Captain Thomas Percy Gleave.
- Group Captain Douglas McCaul Gordon, AFC.
- Group Captain John Watson Jean, DSM.
- Group Captain John Marsden.
- Group Captain Thomas George Skeats.
- Group Captain Edmund Francis Waring, DFC, AFC.
- Acting Group Captain Henry Dawes, OBE.
- Acting Group Captain Henry Eeles.
- Acting Group Captain Albert Frederick Johnson, DFC.
- Acting Group Captain Martin William Nolan.
- Acting Group Captain Charles James Sidney O'Malley, MB, BS, MRCS, LRCP.
- Acting Group Captain William Edward Victor Richards.
- Acting Group Captain Arthur James Richardson.
- Acting Group Captain Frederick John Taylor, Reserve of Air Force Officers.
- Air Commodore Hippolyte Ferdinand De La Rue, DFC, Royal Australian Air Force.
- Acting Air Commodore James Lloyd Findlay, MC, Royal New Zealand Air Force.

Civil Division

- John Lochhead Adam, Chief Surveyor, British Corporation Register of Shipping & Aircraft.
- Professor Richard Charles Alexander, MB, ChB, FRCS(Ed.), Surgical Director, Emergency Medical Service, Eastern Region of Scotland. Professor of Surgery, University of St. Andrews.
- Benjamin George Arthur, MBE. For services as Secretary to various National Trade Associations.
- Reginald Greenwood Bailey, Wool Trade Adviser to the Export Licensing Department of the Board of Trade.
- Allan Ivor Baker, Production Director and chairman, Baker Perkins Ltd.
- Robert Ritchie Bowman, Secretary, Ministry of Labour, Northern Ireland.
- George Alexander Bryson, JP, For public services in Birmingham, and in connection with licensing problems.
- George Morley Carter, Director of Emergency Works & Recovery, Ministry of Works.
- George Chester, General Secretary, National Union of Boot and Shoe Operatives.
- Professor John Douglas Cockcroft, PhD, FRS, Chief Superintendent, Air Defence Research & Development Establishment, Ministry of Supply.
- Colonel Sir Reginald Kennedy Kennedy-Cox, JP, Command Welfare Officer, Southern Command.
- Henry Francis Cronin, MC, MInstCE, MIMechE, Chief Engineer, Metropolitan Water Board. For services to Civil Defence.
- Alderman David Davies, JP, chairman, Carmarthen War Agricultural Executive Committee.
- Arthur James Dedman, Assistant Secretary, Board of Customs & Excise.
- Captain Cyril Roper Pollock Diver, Clerk to the Select Committee on National Expenditure, House of Commons.
- Brigadier-General Robert Maxwell Dudgeon, DSO, MC, JP, HM Inspector of Constabulary for Scotland.
- Walter Alexander Edmenson, Shipping representative of the Ministry of War Transport in Northern Ireland.
- George David Field, MVO, Chief Accountant and Paymaster, Office of the Treasurer to the King.
- Frank Forrest, MInstCE, MIEE, MIMechE, Lately Chief Engineer and Manager, City of Birmingham Electric Supply Department.
- Sylvester Govett Gates, Lately Controller, Ministry of Information.
- Major Kenneth Gordon, MC, Joint Managing Director, Imperial Chemical Industries (Fertilizer & Synthetic Products) Ltd.
- Sidney Joseph Gunningham, FIA, Lately Financial Adviser and Accountant to the Ecclesiastical & Church Estates Commissioners.
- Richard Walker Haddon, Chairman of the Red Cross Agricultural Fund.
- Arthur Clifford Hartley, OBE, Chief Engineer, Anglo-Iranian Oil Co. Ltd.
- Frank Arthur Hughes, Director of Education, Staffordshire.
- George Pratt Insh, DLitt, Principal Lecturer in History, Training College for Teachers, Glasgow.
- William Clark Jackson, JP, chairman, Cambridgeshire War Agricultural Executive Committee.
- Thomas Clews Keeley. For services to Government scientific research and training.
- William Kerr, Town Clerk of Glasgow.
- William Louis Lawton, OBE, JP, Chief Actuary, York County Savings Bank.
- Thomas Alec Edwin Layborn, Agency Manager, Legal & General Assurance Society Ltd. For services to the Ministry of Pensions.
- Captain Roger Norman Liptrot, OBE, assistant director, Research & Development, Ministry of Aircraft Production.
- Archibald Hector McIndoe, MS, MSc, FRCS, Civilian Consultant to the Royal Air Force in Plastic Surgery.
- Andrew Smith Matheson, Chief Engineer Officer, Merchant Navy.
- Bryan Harold Cabot Matthews, ScD, FRS, Head of the Royal Air Force Physiological Laboratory.
- Colonel Wilfred Horatio Micholls, MC, Command Welfare Officer, Western Command.
- Major Joseph Basil Lawrence Monteith, OBE, chairman, Lanarkshire War Agricultural Executive Committee.
- Major Lyndon Henry Morris, MC, DL, Chief Constable and Air Raid Precautions Controller for the County of Devon.
- Arthur Morse, chairman and Acting Chief Manager, Hong Kong and Shanghai Banking Corporation.
- Colonel Luxmoore Newcombe, TD, LittD, Principal Executive Officer and Librarian, National Central Library.
- Lieutenant-Colonel Alfred John Newling, MVO, TD, Royal Artillery, Assistant Secretary, War Office.
- Captain Samuel John Clement Phillips, Commodore Master, Blue Star Line Ltd.
- Ernest Frederick Relf, ARCS, FRAcS, FRS, Superintendent, National Physical Laboratory, Department of Scientific & Industrial Research.
- Richard Lloyd-Roberts, Under Secretary, Ministry of Labour & National Service.
- Thomas Howard Ryland, JP, Vice-chairman, Warwickshire County Council.
- Albert Edward Sammons, Violinist.
- John Walker Stephenson, Labour Adviser to the Minister of Aircraft Production.
- Albert Patrick Loisel Sullivan, MBE, MM, Deputy Chief of the Fire Staff and Deputy Inspector-in-Chief, National Fire Service.
- Robert Arthur Swan, OBE, Legal Secretary, Law Officers' Department.
- Professor Thomas Murray Taylor, Chairman of the Scottish Nurses' Salaries Committee.
- Captain John Wallace Thomas, Master, Merchant Navy.
- Harry Hooper Tomson, Town Clerk of Salford.
- The Honourable James Kenneth Weir, Director, G. & J. Weir, Ltd.
- Reginald Ramson Whitty, OBE, Deputy Public Trustee.
- Alfred Harry Williams, OBE, Honorary Director of Displays to the National Savings Committee.
- Nina Katherine Woods, Lately President of the Mothers' Union.
- Professor Walter Perceval Yetts, OBE, DLitt, MRCS, LRCP, Professor of Chinese Art and Archaeology, London University.

- Ernest Cunningham, British subject resident in Brazil.
- Henry Arthur Hobson, MBE, His Majesty's Consul-General at Havana.
- The Venerable Archdeacon Francis Featherstonhaugh Johnston, Examining Chaplain to the Bishop of Egypt.
- Major Oscar Loewenthal, British subject resident in the Argentine Republic.
- Vivian Lucas Walter, British subject resident in Persia.
- John Frederick Wilkins, OBE, British subject resident in Iraq.
- George Vickery Brooks, Director of Education, State of Tasmania.
- Frank Hugh Harrison, Chief Mechanical Engineer, Railways Department, State of South Australia.
- William James Kinlay Skillicorn, General Manager of Rhodesia Railways Ltd.
- Bernard Joseph Kirchner, Chief Press Adviser, Department of Information & Broadcasting, Government of India.
- John Black Grant, MD, DPH, Director, All-India Institute of Hygiene & Public Health, Calcutta.
- Raja Prithi Chand Lai Chaudhuri, Zamindar, Purnea, Bihar.
- Earnest James Nicholls, Senior Partner in the firm of Messrs. Williamson Magor & Co., Calcutta.
- Vincent Corbett Wright, JP, chairman, War Risks Insurance Advisory Committee, Bombay.
- Michael Joseph Sheehy, Indian Service of Engineers, Chief Engineer, Public Works Department (Buildings & Roads Branch), Burma.
- Charles Joseph Hodgens, Colonial Treasurer, Sierra Leone.
- Thomas Meade Kelshall, OBE. For public services in Trinidad.
- Kobina Arku Korsah, OBE. For public services in the Gold Coast.
- Commander William McLure Lunt, RD, RNR (Retd). For public services in Kenya.
- David Lusk, Chief Telecommunication Engineer, Posts & Telegraphs Department, Ceylon.
- Michael Joseph McConnell, Colonial Police Service, Deputy Inspector-General of Police, Palestine.
- John Phimister Mitchell, OBE, MD, Colonial Medical Service, Medical Superintendent and Principal, Medical School, Mulago, Uganda.
- Abdurrahman, Emir of Daura, Nigeria.
- Suleiman Bey Abdul Razzak Toukan. For public services in Palestine.

=== Order of the Companions of Honour (CH) ===
- Sir Henry Joseph Wood, MusD, DMus, FRAM, FRCM. For services to music.

=== Companion of the Imperial Service Order (ISO) ===
Home Civil Service

- Charles Vincent Burlton, Principal, Air Ministry.
- Edward Henry Chapman, MBE, Director of Supplies, Stationery Office.
- George Henry Harris, Chief Clerk, Home Office.
- Walter George Ives, MBE, Accountant, Dominions Office.
- George Audley Jeffery, Senior Chief Superintendent and Inspector, Mercantile Marine Offices, Ministry of War Transport.
- Dan William Woollard Keech, Principal, Ministry of Supply.
- Percival Charles Lyel, MBE, Senior Staff Officer, War Office.
- Maude Victoria Moore, MBE, Higher Executive Officer, Foreign Office.
- William Morrison, Assistant Keeper, HM General Register House, Edinburgh.
- William Randolph Rogers, Deputy Master of the Perth Branch of the Royal Mint.
- William Herbert Steele, Lately Accountant, Ministry of Information.
- George Wilfred Lowrie Townesend, Head Clerk, Central Office of the Supreme Court of Judicature.
- Leonard Wright, Deputy Comptroller and Accountant General, General Post Office.

Dominion Civil Services

- George Richard Cake, First Clerk in the Department of Home Affairs, Newfoundland.
- Gerald Albert William Pope, General Manager, Government Produce Department, State of South Australia.

Indian Civil Services

- Jubilee Alfred Victor Foregard, Superintendent, Central Telegraph Office, Simla.
- Harry Walter Martin, Deputy Chief Accounting Officer, Office of the High Commissioner for India, London.
- Sri Rao Bahadur Vaidyanatha Ayyar Natesa Ayyar, Deputy Superintendent of Police, Madras.
- Eraoh Byramji Patell, Senior Assistant Secretary to the Government of Bombay, General & Educational Departments, Secretariat, Bombay.

Colonial Service

- Vernon Eugene Frederick Arndt, Administrative Assistant, Department of Government Electrical Undertakings, Ceylon Civil Service.
- Frank Arthur Cottage, Clerk, Storekeeper and Registrar, Veterinary Department, Uganda.
- John de Nobriga, Warden, St. George, District Administration, Trinidad.
- Victor Campbell Mackay, Chief Inspector of Stamps, Crown Agents for the Colonies.
- Louis Maxime Mesle, Customs Officer (Special Grade), Seychelles.
- Donaisami Stanmukham Pillai, 1st Grade Clerk, Accountant-General's Department, Tanganyika Territory.
- Benjamin Victor Sethukavaler, Office Assistant, Trincomalee Kachcheri, Ceylon.
- Gerald Wickremasinghe, Office Assistant, Galle Kachcheri, Ceylon.

=== Kaisar-i-Hind Medal ===
In Gold

- Ann, Lady Dow (wife of Sir Hugh Dow, KCSI, CIE, Governor of Sind).
- Alice Margaret Rose, Lady Lewis (wife of Sir Hawthorne Lewis, KCSI, KCIE, Governor of Orissa).
- Evangeline Booth Crann, Sister-in-Charge, A.R.P. Emergency Hospital, Behala, 24-Parganas District, Bengal.
- Esther Brigham Fowler, Senior Missionary, American Marathi Mission, Sholapur, Bombay.
- The Right Reverend Timothy John Crowley, CSG, Roman Catholic Bishop of Dacca, Bengal.
- Paul William Harrison, Member, Arabian Mission of the Dutch Reformed Church of America at Bahrain, Persian Gulf.
- The Reverend James Watson Runciman, Church of Scotland Mission, Udaipur, Rajputana.

==== Bar to the Kaisar-i-Hind Medal ====
- Winifred Spicer, Matron, Bombay, Baroda & Central Indian Railway Hospital, Ajmer, and Lady Superintendent, Lady Minto's Indian Nursing Association, Rajputana Branch.

=== Imperial Service Medal ===
- Abdul Karim, Telephone Inspector, Calcutta.
- Krishna Laxman Bhangaonkar, Maccadum, Rolling & Cutting Department, His Majesty's Mint, Bombay.
- Mahadeo Gopal Bhosale, Officiating Senior Subedar, Nasik Road Central Prison, Bombay.
- Munshi Narain Mahadeo, Reader Postman, Karachi General Post Office.
- Havaldar Mahomed Masita, Havaldar, Sind Public Works Department, Sind.
- Babu Bhupal Chandra Mitra, Forest Ranger, Khulna, Bengal.

=== Royal Navy ===
Awards for gallantry or outstanding service in the face of the enemy, or for zeal, patience and cheerfulness in dangerous waters, and for setting an example of wholehearted devotion to duty, upholding the high tradition of the Royal Navy. The appointments and awards are for gallantry or good services in the last six months or more of war in His Majesty's Battleships, Aircraft Carriers, Cruisers, Auxiliary Cruisers, Destroyers, Submarines, Minelayers, Corvettes, Sloops, Escort Vessels, Armed Boarding Vessels, Minesweepers, Trawlers, Drifters, Yachts, Anti-Submarine Vessels, Tugs, Motor Gun Boats, Motor Torpedo Boats, Motor Launches, Patrol Ships, Naval Aircraft, Base Ships, Defensively Equipped Merchant Ships.

==== Bar to the Distinguished Service Order (DSO) ====
- Captain William Scott Bardwell, DSO, MVO, (Retd).

==== Distinguished Service Cross (DSC) ====
- Commander the Honourable David Edwardes. (Wincanton, Somerset).
- Commander Charles Woollven Greening.
- Commander Herbert Guy Abbott Lewis.
- Commander Philip Herbert Earle Welby-Everard. (Grantham).
- Commander Charles Everard Hughes White, DSO, (Retd). (Falmouth).
- Acting Commander the Lord Teynham.
- Acting Commander Frederick Alfred George Hunter, RNR. (Southampton).
- Acting Commander Harold Edward Morison, RD, RNR (Retd). (Cemaes Bay, Anglesey).
- Commander (E) Frank Roberts, (Retd). (Manchester).
- Acting Commander (E) Hereward White. (Wells).
- Lieutenant-Commander John Edward Jowitt. (Bournemouth).
- Lieutenant-Commander Colin Colenso Martell. (Emsworth).
- Lieutenant-Commander Kenneth Walter Michell. (Wayford, Somerset).
- Lieutenant-Commander John Malcolm Rodgers.
- Temporary Acting Lieutenant-Commander John Diack Craighead, RNR. (Glasgow).
- Acting Temporary Lieutenant-Commander Frank Tasker, RNR. (Southport).
- Temporary Acting Lieutenant-Commander Kenneth Egremont Anson Bayley, RNVR (Bosham).
- Acting Temporary Lieutenant-Commander Walter Haliburton Gibbs, RNVR. (Bishop Stortford).
- Acting Temporary Lieutenant-Commander John Fleming Linn, RNVR. (Upper Norwood).
- Temporary Acting Lieutenant-Commander Gerald Finlay Primrose Swan, RNVR (Glasgow).
- Acting Temporary Lieutenant-Commander Ronald McKauge, Royal Australian Naval Volunteer Reserve.
- Lieutenant-Commander (A) Anthony Jex-Blake Forde. (Bray, Berkshire).
- Temporary Lieutenant-Commander (E) John Law, RNR. (Birkenhead).
- Lieutenant Michael Patrick Pollock.
- Lieutenant Henry Batten Poustie, RNR.
- Temporary Lieutenant William Leslie Turner, RNR. (Thame).
- Lieutenant Robert Hunter Davison, RNVR.
- Lieutenant Alasdair Forbes Ferguson, RNVR. (Glasgow).
- Temporary Lieutenant Joseph William Sloan Allison, RNVR. (Glasgow).
- Temporary Lieutenant Francis John Blowers, RNVR. (Lowestoft).
- Temporary Lieutenant Frank Chester, RNVR. (Ludlow).
- Temporary Lieutenant Ronald Eric Cunningham, RNVR.
- Temporary Acting Lieutenant Keith Julyan Day, RNVR. (Fritton).
- Temporary Lieutenant Thomas William Ceri Fisher, RNVR.
- Temporary Lieutenant Ronald Edward Hawker, RNVR. (Southend).
- Temporary Lieutenant John Francis Johns, RNVR. (Briton Ferry, Glamorganshire).
- Temporary Lieutenant Maxwell Low, RNVR. (Dover).
- Temporary Lieutenant Peter Reid, RNVR (Bournemouth).
- Temporary Lieutenant Charles Throgmorton Ball, Royal Australian Naval Volunteer Reserve. (Edinburgh).
- Temporary Lieutenant William Miles Marley, Royal Australian Naval Volunteer Reserve. (Brisbane, Australia).
- Temporary Lieutenant Maurice Leigh Newman, Royal New Zealand Naval Volunteer Reserve. (Christchurch, New Zealand).
- Paymaster Lieutenant Charles Patrick Danby Hunter. (Esher).
- Temporary Lieutenant (A) Allan George Blanchard, RNVR. (Hull).
- Temporary Lieutenant (E) William Alexander Bell, RNR. (Sheerness).
- Temporary Lieutenant (E) Robert Fingland Turnbull, RNR. (Great Crosby, Lancashire).
- Temporary Lieutenant (E) Albert Edward Heydon, RNVR. (Dartford).
- Temporary Instructor Lieutenant Donald MacDonald Macphee, MA. (Oban).
- Acting Skipper Lieutenant James Walter Morris, RNR, 2669, W.S. (Milford Haven).
- Temporary Skipper Hans Albert Jensen, RNR, T.S.734 (Hull).
- Temporary Skipper James Moore, RNR, T.S.627 (Lowestoft).
- Temporary Skipper Jasper Alfred Stanberry Pidgeon, RNR, 579T.S.
- Temporary Sub-Lieutenant Thomas Graham Hughes, RNVR. (Hulme, Cheshire).
- Temporary Acting Sub-Lieutenant John Boyd Williamson, RNVR.
- Mr. Charles Henry Reynolds, Temporary Gunner. (Gosport).
- Mr. George Healy Trend, Commissioned Engineer. (Plymouth).
- Mr. Joseph Henry Tylor, Temporary Warrant Engineer. (Rainham Market).
- Mr. Stanley Victor Heaton, Warrant Mechanician.
- Mr. Henry Brown, Temporary Warrant Mechanician.

===== Bar to the Distinguished Service Cross (DSC) =====
- Temporary Acting Lieutenant-Commander Wynyard Paul Bush, DSC, RNVR (Torquay).
- Lieutenant Herbert Anthony John Hollings, DSC.

==== Distinguished Service Medal (DSM) ====
- Chief Petty Officer Barnard Dickenson, C/J.108853 (Sheerness).
- Chief Petty Officer Thomas Henry Edmonds, C/J.105242 (Gillingham).
- Chief Petty Officer William James Johnson, D/J.84947 (Great Crosby, Lancashire).
- Chief Petty Officer Frederick Arthur Meager, P/J.41891 (Penge).
- Chief Petty Officer Cyril Charles Mitchell, C/J.99549 (Falmouth).
- Chief Petty Officer (Second Hand) William Henry Roberts, LT/JX.212564 (Great Yarmouth).
- Chief Petty Officer John Taylor, C/JX.162324 (Chatham).
- Chief Yeoman of Signals Reginald John Luchford C/J.107345 (Gillingham).
- Chief Yeoman of Signals Edward Joseph Walshe, C/J.51277 (Colchester).
- Chief Petty Officer Telegraphist Donald Alexander Yates, D/J.111764.
- Chief Engine Room Artificer John Clement Dixon, C/M. 18327 (Edington, Wiltshire).
- Chief Engine Room Artificer Edward George Mortimore Harris, C/M.35349 (Torquay).
- Chief Engine Room Artificer William John Ceilings Wright, D/MX.45259 (Tavistock).
- Acting Chief Engine Room Artificer Stanley George Gaskell, P/MX.57132 (Garston, Lancashire).
- Chief Stoker Charles Jacobs, D/KX.61274 (Colbrooke, Devon).
- Chief Stoker Sydney Walter Roots, C/K.37014 (Maidstone).
- Chief Stoker Frederick James Stuttaford, D/K.56062 (Plymouth).
- Chief Ordnance Artificer William Oscar Greatorex, D/MX.48660 (Derby).
- Chief Mechanician Herbert Ernest Henry Checksfield, C/K.63928 (Gillingham).
- Chief Mechanician George Edward Hutchinson, C/K.58510 (Portsmouth).
- Chief Motor Mechanic William Arthur Bert Neville, C/MX.67529 (Windlesham, Surrey).
- Chief Engineman Arthur Cecil Clementson, LT/KX.124843 (Beckenham).
- Chief Engineman John Coull, X.402 E.U (Buckie, Banffshire).
- Chief Engineman James Samuel Hill, LT/X.397 E.T. (Winterton).
- Chief Engineman Fred Morris, LT/X.279 E.U. (North Shields).
- Chief Engineman Harry Francis Reade, LT/KX.101620 (Grimsby).
- Second Hand Lewis Henry Binns, LT/JX.224360 (Cleethorpes).
- Second Hand John Edward Freer, LT/JX.210702 (Hull).
- Second Hand Horace Broderick Laity, LT/X.7574C (Falmouth).
- Second Hand James Mercer Thomson, LT/JX.217841 (Kincardine-on-Forth).
- Temporary Supply Chief Petty Officer Roderick Ivor Hughes, C/MX.47165 (Cappagh, Co. Waterford).
- Engine Room Artificer Third Class Frank Percy Boulton, BEM, C/MX.73612 (Luton).
- Engine Room Artificer Third Class Arthur Victor Gilbert, P/MX.78034 (Longthorpe, Peterborough).
- Engine Room Artificer Third Class William Charles Woodland, D/MX.65278 (Exeter).
- Electrical Artificer Third Class Frederick John Noad, P/MX.53847 (Gosport).
- Ordnance Artificer Third Class Albert Leslie Claridge, P/MX.55693 (Portsmouth).
- Petty Officer Alfred Charles Almond, P/J.110717.
- Petty Officer Edwin Rothwell. Bath, P/J.101608.
- Petty Officer Alfred Edward Victor Cadman, LT/JX.210798 (Bristol).
- Petty Officer William Gabriel, D/JX.125585 (Glasgow).
- Petty Officer Alfred Ling, C/JX.136199 (Ilford).
- Petty Officer William Herbert John Logie, D/J.113477 (Plymouth).
- Petty Officer Ernest Llewellyn Murt, X.9964B (Padstow).
- Petty Officer Albert George Ralph, P/J.113293.
- Petty Officer Adolphus Augustus Rayner, C/JX.134861.
- Petty Officer Stanley Gibson Stead, LT/JX.166257 (Hull).
- Acting Petty Officer Antonio Joseph Carmelo Bartolomew Publio De'Battista, Malta/JX.139290 (Malta).
- Temporary Acting Petty Officer Arthur William Ayling, P/J.73290 (Portslade).
- Temporary Acting Petty Officer Frank Theodore Botting, P/7.30354 (Porchester).
- Temporary Acting Petty Officer Thomas Bray, P/J.92536 (Nuneaton).
- Temporary Acting Petty Officer Jack Jarvis Burnett, P/JX.97516 (Datchet).
- Temporary Acting Petty Officer Arthur Edwin Ernest Chapman, D/JX.172555 (Cardiff).
- Temporary Acting Petty Officer Gerald Wilfred Griffin, C/J.52137 (Watford).
- Temporary Acting Petty Officer Dennis Norman Harvey, D/BDX.1696 (Bristol).
- Temporary Acting Petty Officer Charles Henry James, P/SS.8983 (Cramlington).
- Temporary Acting Petty Officer John Henry Lakin, P/JX.204900 (Coventry).
- Temporary Acting Petty Officer Alexander Macdonald, P/X.19253A (Barras, Stornoway).
- Temporary Acting Petty Officer Thomas Peel, P/SS.10245 (Monkseaton).
- Temporary Acting Petty Officer Frank Potts, D/JX.218292 (Crewe).
- Acting Temporary Petty Officer Harold Alfred Douglas Turtle, P/JX.159958 (Ryde, Isle of Wight).
- Temporary Acting Petty Officer George Henry Weaver, P/JX.165355 (Southampton).
- Temporary Acting Petty Officer Ronald Wellby, C/JX.125502 (New Maiden).
- Temporary Acting Petty Officer William Thomas Williams, D/BDX.1391 (Bristol).
- Temporary Acting Petty Officer William Woods, D/JX.181622 (Belfast).
- Yeoman of Signals Raymond Frederick Bennett, C/JX.171127 (Hull).
- Yeoman of Signals Robert Burns, D/J.87873 (Edinburgh).
- Yeoman of Signals John Bernard Catterall, C/JX.172308 (Grimsby).
- Yeoman of Signals Frank Clarkson Coward, C/JX.186251 (Doncaster).
- Yeoman of Signals Charles Joseph Harris, D/JX.132037 (Bittaford).
- Yeoman of Signals William Ernest Lovelock, P/JX.166154 (Surbiton).
- Yeoman of Signals Joseph Patterson, D/JX.134113 (Plympton).
- Yeoman of Signals Arthur Roberts, P/JX.131025 (Paignton).
- Yeoman of Signals Sydney Frank Stevens, P/JX.164927 (West Wickham).
- Yeoman of Signals Robert Banks Stewart, C/JX.172056 (Dreghorn, Ayrshire).
- Petty Officer Telegraphist Jesse Lilly, P/J.84401 (Cosham).
- Petty Officer Telegraphist James Russell Melrose, P/J.62858 (Edinburgh).
- Petty Officer Telegraphist Ronald Mullins, P/JX.137004 (Borden, Hampshire).
- Petty Officer Telegraphist Clifford Relton, D/J.86937 (Sleaford).
- Petty Officer Telegraphist Eric Arthur Shove, P/JX.135998 (Fareham).
- Engine Room Artificer Fourth Class Denis Colclough, P/MX.72895 (Newton Cunningham, Donegal).
- Engine Room Artificer Fourth Class Eric Marsden, C/MX.66034 (Stockport).
- Stoker Petty Officer Percy Luther Winter, C/KX.779H (London, SE.4).
- Petty Officer Motor Mechanic Alan Richardson, C/MX.67430.
- Engineman William Donaldson Geddes, LT/KX.105079 (Leith).
- Engineman Arthur Edward Nessling, LT/KX.105085 (Great Malvern).
- Blacksmith First Class William Richard John Baker, C/MX.45192 (Gravesend).
- Petty Officer Storekeeper Norman Gilbert, NAP/R.225334 (Wadebridge).
- Sergeant Leonard George Stone, Royal Marines, Ply.22325 (Wiveliscombe, Somerset).
- Acting Temporary Sergeant Arthur John Kerslake, Royal Marines, Ply.17813 (Newton Abbot).
- Acting Temporary Sergeant William Edward Sweetingham, Royal Marines, Ch.19179 (Lytham St Annes).
- Leading Seaman Frank Joseph Colyer, LT/JX.265448 (Brighton).
- Leading Seaman Frank Kitchener Hannaford, LT/JX.164780 (Milford Haven).
- Leading Seaman Herbert Robert Kingman, D/JX.132507 (Rhondda).
- Leading Seaman Dennis Sharpe, LT/JX.219679 (Hull).
- Leading Seaman Robert John Sutton, LT/JX.221517 (Grimsby).
- Leading Seaman George Thresh, LT/JX.167133 (Hull).
- Leading Seaman George. Woolgar, LT/JX.185342 (Lymington).
- Temporary Leading Seaman Kenneth Royston Ward, P/JX.189097 (Manchester).
- Temporary Acting Leading Seaman Henry Greear, P/JX.213201 (York).
- Temporary Acting Leading Seaman Harold Neal, P/JX.227885 (Birmingham).
- Convoy Leading Signalman Albert Edward Rudkin, C/LD/X.4212 (Welling).
- Leading Signalman Arthur Dryden, C/JX.228640 (Bromley).
- Acting Leading Signalman Raymond Vincent Felix Collins, D/JX.145155 (Glencairn, South Africa).
- Leading Telegraphist Frederick James Stubbs, P/J.54903 (Portsmouth).
- Leading Stoker William Isaac Phillips, D/KX.81430 (Edinburgh).
- Able Seaman Allan Bell, D/JX.288212 (Carlisle).
- Able Seaman Frederick Hodge, D/J.43381 (Exeter).
- Able Seaman Frederick Stanley Martin, D/X.10051 B. (Liverpool).
- Able Seaman Arthur Ernest Metheringham, P/JX.184025 (Caythorpe, Lincolnshire).
- Able Seaman Harry Starkie Openshaw, D/JX.256560 (Chorley).
- Able Seaman Harry William Payne, C/J.115134 (Beckenham).
- Able Seaman Henry Sinclair McKenzie Riddell, D/SSX.15763 (Dinnet, Aberdeenshire).
- Acting Able Seaman Frederick Charles Hammond, P/JX.268355 (Ramsgate).
- Telegraphist Leslie Denzil Adams, D/JX.262229 (Tottenham).
- Telegraphist Austin Janies Brown, D/JX.261088 (Eastleigh).
- Telegraphist Edwin John William Slater C/WRX.1213 (Rayleigh).
- Stoker First Class Daniel Bruce, P/KX.89445 (Glasgow).
- Stoker First Class Alfred Edward Cringle, LT/KX.100530 (Douglas, Isle of Man).
- Seaman Kenneth Gilley, LT/JX.205472 (Leeds).
- Seaman Gwilym Henry John, LT/JX.280158 (Calran, Glamorganshire).
- Seaman Charles James Lydiate, LT/JX.226250 (Birkenhead).
- Seaman Kenneth MacKinnon, D/X.18899 A (Stornoway).
- Seaman John William Smith, LT/JX.242010 (Gainsborough).
- Musician Edgar Falcon Pain, R.M.B/X.246 (Scarborough).

==== Mentioned in Despatches ====
- Captain William Halford Selby, DSC. (Maidstone).
- Commander Edward Cresswell Bayldon, DSC. (Henley-on-Thames).
- Commander Henry Norman Scott Brown, OBE. (Alnwick).
- Commander John Paul Guido Bryant. (Woking).
- Commander Edward Tyndale Cooper, DSO. (Twyford).
- Commander Vernon D'Arcy Donaldson.
- Commander Christopher Haynes Hutchinson, DSO. (Pangbourne).
- Commander Kenyon Harry Terrell Peard. (Liphook).
- Commander Edward Fowle Pizey, DSO. (Earl's Court).
- Acting Commander Arthur Hugh Wynne-Edwards, (Retd).
- Commander (E) Geoffrey Arthur Dyson Cooper. (Harlow, Essex).
- Commander (E) Henry John Bedford Grylls. (Bath).
- Commander (E) Frederick Hugh Phillips. (Swanwich).
- Commander (E) Philip Cardwell Taylor. (Gerrard's Cross).
- Acting Paymaster Commander Howard Louis Spurrier, RNR. (Ipswich).
- Major (Acting Lieutenant-Colonel) Ernest John Woodington, Royal Marines (Eastbourne).
- Major (Acting Lieutenant-Colonel) Archibald John Wright, Royal Marines (Luton).
- Lieutenant-Commander Adrian James Dent. (Torrington).
- Lieutenant-Commander Rupert Christopher Oswald Hill, (Retd). (Greenock).
- Acting Lieutenant-Commander Cyril William Armstrong, RNR.
- Acting Lieutenant-Commander Charles William Leadbetter, RNR. (Fleetwood).
- Temporary Acting Lieutenant-Commander Leonard Rupert Curtis, RNVR. (London).
- Temporary Acting Lieutenant-Commander Harold Graham King, RNVR. (Poole).
- Acting Temporary Lieutenant-Commander Stephen Francis Rothon, RNVR. (Farnborough Park).
- Temporary Acting Lieutenant-Commander John Douglas Tooms, RNVR. (Truro).
- Acting Temporary Lieutenant-Commander Arthur Hugh Shaw Mayne, Royal Canadian Naval Volunteer Reserve. (Sheerness).
- Lieutenant-Commander (E) Geoffrey William Tanner.
- Lieutenant-Commander (E) Francis Leslie Tewkesbury. (Bere Alston, Devon).
- Lieutenant-Commander (E) George Henry Ashby, RNR. (Runnington, Somerset).
- Acting Lieutenant-Commander (E) James Bowman, DSC, RNR.
- Temporary Lieutenant-Commander (E) Thomas John Sweett, RNR. (Plymouth).
- Temporary Captain (Acting Temporary Major) Philip John Ryves Harding, Royal Marines (Dorchester).
- Lieutenant (Acting Major) John Patrick Kelly, DSM, Royal Marines (Plymouth).
- Temporary Captain (Acting Temporary Major) Hugh Lindsay, Royal Marines (Harrow).
- Temporary Captain (Acting Temporary Major) Richard Henry Chase Taylor, Royal Marines (Troon, near Ayr).
- The Reverend Christian James Stubbs, Chaplain. (Barnsley).
- Lieutenant Peter John Bayne.
- Lieutenant Montague Keith Burnett. (Portsmouth).
- Lieutenant Michael Guy Chichester. (Warminster).
- Lieutenant Anthony Mervyn Cole-Hamilton. (Brecon).
- Lieutenant Robert Allistair Gilchrist. (Strathyre, Perthshire).
- Lieutenant Edward Melvill Brodie Hoare. (Shrewsbury).
- Lieutenant Brian Mortimer Duncan I'Anson. (Newbury).
- Lieutenant Richard Burgess Michell, DSC. (Cranleigh).
- Lieutenant William Donough O'Brien, DSC. (Hatfield).
- Lieutenant Thomas Wathen Stocker. (Alverstoke).
- Lieutenant Alan Frank Buckland Stuart. (Londonderry).
- Lieutenant James Antony Syms, DSC. (Stanley Green, Surrey).
- Lieutenant James Denis Williams. (Coolham).
- Lieutenant Leslie Willoughby Green, RNR. (Bournemouth).
- Temporary Lieutenant Peter MacKenzie Chadwick, RNR. (Amersham).
- Temporary Lieutenant Walter Gibson, RNR. (Larne, Northern Ireland).
- Temporary Lieutenant Richard Christopher Stancliffe Hurst, RNR. (Bridport).
- Lieutenant Robert Bird, RNVR.
- Lieutenant John Edward Blackmore, RNVR. (Brockenhurst).
- Lieutenant Ronald Parkyn Booth, RNVR. (West Kirby).
- Lieutenant Charles Russell Dunlop, RNVR. (Edinburgh).
- Lieutenant Robert George Eburah, RNVR. (Birmingham).
- Temporary Lieutenant Derek Cecil Spring, RNVR. (Rickmansworth).
- Lieutenant William Williamson, RNVR (Liverpool).
- Temporary Lieutenant Jack Preston Alton, RNVR.
- Temporary Lieutenant Carl Brunning, RNVR. (Greasby, Cheshire).
- Temporary Lieutenant George Symington Carlow, RNVR. (Glasgow).
- Temporary Lieutenant Robert Henry Woodgate Carter, RNVR. (Parkstone).
- Temporary Lieutenant Norman Ernest Colland, RNVR. (Derby).
- Temporary Lieutenant Walter Couper, RNVR. (Glasgow).
- Temporary Lieutenant Frank Darton, RNVR. (Torquay).
- Temporary Lieutenant James Galloway Fletcher, RNVR. (Giffnock, Renfrewshire).
- Temporary Lieutenant Thomas George Stanley Hall, RNVR. (Northampton).
- Temporary Lieutenant William Grange Harding, RNVR. (Newcastle).
- Temporary Lieutenant Herbert Frank Harvey, RNVR. (Ludlow).
- Temporary Lieutenant Francis Arthur Hawkins, RNVR.
- Temporary Lieutenant Gerald Graham Dudley Head, RNVR.
- Temporary Lieutenant William Dennis Hosking, RNVR. (Tressillian, Cornwall).
- Temporary Lieutenant John Hudspeth, RNVR. (Newcastle upon Tyne).
- Temporary Lieutenant Horatio Sidney Lee, RNVR. (Wembley).
- Temporary Lieutenant Leonard Andrew Levey, RNVR. (Southend).
- Temporary Lieutenant Eric John Lockett, RNVR.
- Temporary Lieutenant Edward Lyon RNVR. (Sheffield).
- Temporary Lieutenant Harry Victor Harris Marks, RNVR. (Amersham).
- Temporary Lieutenant John Henry Mathews, RNVR. (Bosham).
- Temporary Lieutenant (Admiral, Retd) the Honourable Sir Herbert Meade-Fetherstonhaugh, GCVO, CB, DSO, RNVR.
- Temporary Lieutenant Edward Lewis Neilson, RNVR. (Retford).
- Temporary Lieutenant William Edward Sugden Robinson, RNVR. (Keighley).
- Temporary Lieutenant William Frederick Irvine Stephenson, RNVR. (Bournemouth).
- Temporary Lieutenant Charles Guy Vaughan-Lee, RNVR. (Midhurst).
- Temporary Lieutenant Harry Williams Ward, RNVR. (London).
- Temporary Lieutenant Peter Charles Wilkinson, RNVR. (Gerrard's Cross).
- Lieutenant John Sharp, Royal Australian Naval Volunteer Reserve.
- Lieutenant Richard John Slattery, Royal Australian Naval Volunteer Reserve.
- Lieutenant Vere Gordon Thorn, Royal Australian Naval Volunteer Reserve.
- Lieutenant Alan Gardner, Royal Canadian Naval Volunteer Reserve (Calgary, Alberta).
- Lieutenant (E) William Henry Arnold.
- Temporary Lieutenant (E) Vernon Tuke Taylor. (Hoddesden).
- Temporary Lieutenant (E) Samuel Beresford Evitt, RNVR.
- Temporary Lieutenant (E) Ronald Corner Foster Stockhill, RNR. (London).
- Temporary Lieutenant (E) Gerald John Nicholson Limebeer, SANF(V) (Johannesberg).
- Temporary Surgeon Lieutenant Ian Hamilton Miller, MRCS, LRCP, RNVR (London, NW.3).
- Temporary Surgeon Lieutenant Geoffrey Holker Murray, MB, ChB, RNVR (Preston).
- Paymaster Lieutenant Frederick Ronald Helwell, RNR. (Barnes, London).
- Temporary Acting Paymaster Lieutenant John Gustavus Ralph Warburton, RNR. (Bromborough).
- Temporary Lieutenant (Acting Temporary Captain) (Quartermaster) Henry Charles Smith, Royal Marines (Sheerness).
- Acting Temporary Skipper Lieutenant George Hattan, DSC, RNR, 141 T.S. (Hull).
- Temporary Acting Skipper Lieutenant Thomas Ferens, RNR, 176 T.S. (Nawton, Yorkshire).
- Acting Temporary Skipper Lieutenant Henry French, RNR, 252 T.S. (Hull).
- Acting Skipper Lieutenant George Henry Green, RNR, 2848 W.S. (Winterton).
- Acting Temporary Skipper Lieutenant Thomas Richardson Robinson, RNR, T.S.253 (Hull).
- Acting Chief Skipper Henry James Barnard, RNR, 2729 W.S. (Caister-on-Sea).
- Skipper Percy Robert Smith Besford, RNR, 3475 W.S. (Lowestoft).
- Temporary Skipper Stanley James Cutts, RNR, 643 T.S. (Hadfield, near Manchester).
- Temporary Skipper Jorjes Laurids Larsen, RNR, 1031 T.S. (Fleetwood).
- Sub-Lieutenant Anthony David Casswell. (Wimbledon).
- Sub-Lieutenant Edward Rex Chard, RNVR (Axbridge).
- Temporary Sub-Lieutenant Peter Desmond Parnell, RNR. (Killin, Scotland).
- Temporary Sub-Lieutenant Leslie Norman Benthall, RNVR. (Kensington).
- Temporary Sub-Lieutenant John Harrison Burnett, RNVR.
- Temporary Sub-Lieutenant Francis Kenneth Elkingron, RNVR. (Danbury, Essex).
- Temporary Sub-Lieutenant George Thomas Bridges Stevens, RNVR. (London).
- Temporary Sub-Lieutenant Philip Arthur Joseph Sturge, RNVR. (Birmingham).
- Lieutenant Arnold Bell, Royal Marines (Chatham).
- Mr. Edward Moore, Commissioned Gunner. (Wimbledon).
- Mr. William Frank Bailey, Gunner. (Canterbury).
- Mr. Richard Tom Lidsey, Gunner.
- Mr. John Alan MacAllan, Gunner (T). (Cobham).
- Mr. George Frederick John Wilkinson, Commissioned Ordnance Officer. (Porchester).
- Mr. Thomas Henry Davison, Commissioned Electrician. (Withdean, Brighton).
- Mr. Edward William Shepherd, Commissioned Electrician. (Rottingdean).
- Mr. Cyril James Miller, Commissioned Cook.
- Mr. William Barker, Warrant Electrician. (Sheet, Hampshire).
- Mr. Edwin Jones, Warrant Electrician. (Gillingham).
- Mr. William Arthur Smith, Temporary Warrant Electrician. (Horndean).
- Mr. Ronald Douglas Martin, Warrant Shipwright. (Southsea).
- Mr. Walter Edward Brocklebank, Warrant Ordnance Officer. (Gillingham).
- Mr. Gerald James William Licence, Warrant Ordnance Officer. (Oxford).
- Mr. Arthur William James Beckett, Warrant Engineer. (Farlington).
- Mr. Francis Henry Rickard, Warrant Engineer. (St. Austell).
- Mr. George Babb, Temporary Acting Warrant Engineer. (Plymouth).
- Mr. Egbert Ernest Hodges, DSC, Temporary Warrant Engineer. (London).
- Mr. Stephen Henry Kettlewell, Temporary Warrant Engineer. (Portsmouth).
- Mr. Herbert Cecil Shepheard, Temporary Warrant Engineer. (Portsmouth).
- Mr. John Reuben Adams, Warrant Mechanician. (Fareham).
- Mr. Harold Healey, Warrant Mechanician. (Sunderland).
- Mr. John Keating, Warrant Mechanician. (Clonakilty, Co. Cork).
- Mr. William Robert Kipling, Warrant Mechanician.
- Chief Petty Officer Thomas Bodfield, D/J.106283 (Bude).
- Chief Petty Officer Leonard Arthur John Coombs, P/J.107664 (Porchester).
- Chief Petty Officer Ralph Cumberley, D/J.31509 (Saltash).
- Chief Petty Officer Oakeley Arthur Davies, D/J.107225 (Plymouth).
- Chief Petty Officer John Francis Day, P/J.93888 (Tichfield).
- Chief Petty Officer Ernest George Victor Durn, P/J.114482 (Cosham, Hampshire).
- Chief Petty Officer Leonard William Ingram, C/J.93738 (Gillingham).
- Chief Petty Officer Frederick William Merrett, C/J.104187 (North Brackley, Hampshire).
- Chief Petty Officer Alfred Ernest Livens, D/J.10652 (Banbury).
- Chief Petty Officer William Donald Alexander Morris, P/J.106975 (Horley, Surrey).
- Chief Petty Officer Michael John O'Leary, D/J.54851 (Dublin).
- Chief Petty Officer Stanley Alfred Pearman, C/J.101216 (Hatfield).
- Chief Petty Officer Harold Head Pitman, D/J.98128 (Manchester).
- Chief Petty Officer George Arthur Rossiter, P/J.108964 (Gosport).
- Chief Petty Officer Bevington Squibb, D/J.93743 (Devonport).
- Chief Petty Officer Percy Williams, DSM, D/JX.128178 (Topsham, Devon).
- Acting Chief Petty Officer Beverly Arthur James Britnell, D/J.108209 (Walthamstow).
- Acting Chief Petty Officer Arthur Clemesha, C/J.106451 (Southend).
- Acting Chief Petty Officer Arthur John Clover, P/J.102318 (Portsmouth).
- Acting Chief Petty Officer Alfred Leslie Colton, P/JX.130518 (Southsea).
- Acting Chief Petty Officer Thomas Grafton, C/JX.131533 (Lowestoft).
- Acting Chief Petty Officer Cecil Hallett Hankcock, P/JX.126233 (Gosport).
- Acting Chief Petty Officer Herbert George Samuel Marriott, P/J.107726.
- Temporary Chief Petty Officer William Merrill Montgomery, R.C.N.2561 (Victoria, British Columbia).
- Temporary Acting Chief Petty Officer Sydney James Pearce, P/JX.125859 (Aldershot).
- Acting Chief Petty Officer Ernest Rushton, P/J.31343 (Lymington).
- Chief Yeoman of Signals Joseph Reginald Middleton, C/J.103503 (Penge).
- Chief Yeoman of Signals Stanley James Robinson, P/JX.131809 (Portsmouth).
- Chief Yeoman of Signals Eldridge Alfred James Upton, DSM, BEM, P/J.79448 (Basingstoke).
- Chief Engine Room Artificer Charles Victor Ball, P/MX.47229 (Richmond, Yorkshire).
- Chief Engine Room Artificer Edwin Alfred Brooks, D/MX.47963.
- Chief Engine Room Artificer Edward Henry Cherry, D/M.28754 (Mallow, Co. Cork).
- Chief Engine Room Artificer George Henry Cole, C/M.27327 (Bedford).
- Chief Engine Room Artificer Harry Lionel Cook, P/M.36642 (Portsmouth).
- Chief Engine Room Artificer Edward Eaton, DSM, C/M.33275 (Lower Dean, Huntingdonshire).
- Chief Engine Room Artificer Kenneth Charles Bernard Geake, C/M.38780 (Gillingham).
- Chief Engine Room Artificer Frederick John Grimmer, DSM, C/MX.47134 (Caister-on-Sea).
- Chief Engine Room Artificer James William Hebbard, DSM, D/MX.46938 (Lamlash, Isle of Arran).
- Chief Engine Room Artificer George Stewart Killan, DSM, BEM, D/MX.46543 (Plymouth).
- Chief Engine Room Artificer Gordon Frederick Thomas King, P/MX.54441 (Portsmouth).
- Chief Engine Room Artificer Bertie James Nash, C/M.37661 (Greenwich).
- Chief Engine Room Artificer Ronald O'Brien, DSM, C/MX.48425 (Hyndland, Glasgow).
- Chief Engine Room Artificer Norman John Victor Pannell, P/M.39405 (Portsmouth).
- Chief Engine Room Artificer Sydney Frederick Small, D/MX.49210.
- Chief Engine Room Artificer Frank Harrison Whales, P/M.34460 (Fareham).
- Chief Engine Room Artificer Griffith George Woodward, D/M.38813 (Devonport).
- Acting Chief Engine Room Artificer Leslie Albert Arthur Dumper, P/MX.49185 (Sandown, Isle of Wight).
- Temporary Chief Engine Room Artificer James William Dornan, D/MX.52194 (Torquay).
- Acting Chief Engine Room Artificer David Albert Mutch, D/M.34928 (Portsmouth).
- Temporary Chief Engine Room Artificer Charlie Rimmington, C/MX.47949 (Gillingham).
- Chief Stoker George Sidney Boyd, C/K.63232 (West Ewell, Surrey).
- Chief Stoker Walter Charles Frederick Bugg, C/K.50095 (Newcastle).
- Chief Stoker William Cheeseman, C/K.60596 (Camberwell).
- Chief Stoker Richard Stephenson Cross, C/K.63112.
- Chief Stoker John Henry Charles Day, P/KX.76760 (Portsmouth).
- Chief Stoker John Arthur Fitzjohn, C/K.61000 (Chatham).
- Chief Stoker Stanley Gregory, P/KX.76781 (Whitehaven).
- Chief Stoker William John Hall, D/K.62159 (Risca, Monmouthshire).
- Chief Stoker Ernest William Hazell, P/K.59547 (Portsmouth).
- Chief Stoker Matthew Jamieson, P/K.61433 (Glasgow).
- Chief Stoker Leslie Kerton, D/K.64343 (St Budeaux, Plymouth).
- Chief Stoker Hugh McKenzie, P/K.64445 (Glasgow).
- Chief Stoker Henry Charles Mapstone, C/K.65695.
- Chief Stoker Albert Marshall, C/K.65759 (Bayswater).
- Chief Stoker Albert Lewis Francis Mills, D/KX.77173 (Pembroke Dock).
- Chief Stoker John William O'Hara, P/K.59273 (Portsmouth).
- Chief Stoker George Frederick Pond, P/KX.75666 (Porchester).
- Chief Stoker Charles Wilson, C/K.59624 (Maidstone).
- Temporary Chief Stoker Brynmawr Treharne, D/KX.76560 (Maesteg, Glamorganshire).
- Chief Electrical Artificer Reginald Corner, C/MX.46605 (Mortlake).
- Chief Electrical Artificer John Ernest Denny, DSM, C/MX.45614 (Gillingham).
- Chief Electrical Artificer Frederick Horace Frank Hornblow, DSM, D/MX.45679 (St. Ives).
- Chief Electrical Artificer John Edwell Johnson, D/MX.46145 (Plymouth).
- Chief Electrical Artificer Richard Beever King, C/MX.47237 (Torquay).
- Chief Electrical Artificer Second Class Frederick William Stacey, DSM, P/M 37772.
- Chief Ordnance Artificer Robert Wilson Dunn, C/M.35678 (Tunbridge Wells).
- Chief Ordnance Artificer Willie Edgar Scrimshaw, P/M. 35580 (Dunfermline).
- Chief Ordnance Artificer William Herbert Woods, C/M.38611 (Maidstone).
- Chief Shipwright William Culf, C/MX.45372.
- Chief Shipwright Hugh Rigby Newton, C/M.6336 (Gillingham).
- Chief Engineman James Yule Duthie, LT/KX.114248 (Rosehearty).
- Chief Engineman David Gibb, LT/KX.113975 (Stranraer).
- Chief Engineman James Nicholson, DSM, X.5929 E.S. (Grimsby).
- Chief Engineman Wilfred Harry Osborn, LT/KX.124598 (Grimsby).
- Chief Engineman Gerald Joseph Prendiville, LT/KX.105707 (Wavertree).
- Chief Engineman Edwin Harold Spooner, LT/KX.116784 (Hull).
- Chief Engineman Sidney Wells, DSM, L/KX.108332 (Grimsby).
- Acting Chief Engineman Andrew James Paterson, LT/KX.109818 (Macduff).
- Acting Chief Petty Officer Engineman John Christopher White, LT/KX.98761 (Hull).
- Acting Chief Motor Mechanic Joseph Brannen, P/MX.89896 (Manchester).
- Acting Chief Motor Mechanic James McGhie, P/MX.98205 (Stranraer).
- Mechanician First Class Leslie Hubert Christopher, C/KX.79009 (Gillingham).
- Second Hand John James Drake, LT/JX.281445 (Fleetwood).
- Second Hand Frank Pepper, LT/JX.174577.
- Second Hand Donald Sutherland Smith, LT/JX.225107 (Aberdeen).
- Second Hand Samuel Craik West, LT/JX.215772 (Mannaig, Invernessshire).
- Sick Berth Chief Petty Officer Philip Mumford Bond, C/M.36235 (Greenford).
- Chief Petty Officer Writer William Noel Barley, C/MX.5H02 (Rainham, Kent).
- Supply Chief Petty Officer Alfred George Adley, C/MX.45872 (Gravesend).
- Supply Chief Petty Officer Charles Joseph Henry Bennett, D/M.37605 (Plymouth).
- Supply Chief Petty Officer Frederick Charles Driskell, C/M.37875 (Herne Bay).
- Supply Chief Petty Officer Sidney Herbert Jones, C/K.23796 (Harrow).
- Supply Chief Petty Officer Cecil Harry Vassie, P/MX.45070 (Portsmouth).
- Master-at-Arms Arthur Edward Roll, P/M.39931 (Hornsea, Yorkshire).
- Master-at-Arms Ronald Randall Weaven, C/M.39719 (Rochester).
- Chief Petty Officer Cook (S) James Herbert Wright, D/M.12839 (Torquay).
- Chief Cook Second Class Edward Shields, NAP/R.11906 (Liverpool).
- Chief Steward John Broom, NAP/1129762 (Saltcoats, Ayrshire).
- Engine Room Artificer First Class Louis Bernard Desmares, C/M.39355 (Gillingham).
- Engine Room Artificer First Class Henry Penrose, D/M.2494.
- Engine Room Artificer Second Class Fleetwood Willingham Ould, D/MX.53034 (Falmouth).
- Engine Room Artificer Second Class Walter William Soper, P/MX.53272 (Greenock).
- Engine Room Artificer Third Class Ernest Walter Bastin, D/MX.54340 (Torquay).
- Engine Room Artificer Third Class John Norman Davies, D/SR.8840 (Penarth).
- Engine Room Artificer Third Class John Joseph Hennessey, D/MX.61871 (Bolton).
- Engine Room Artificer Third Class Arthur Gordon Morrell, P/MX.59349 (Sunderland).
- Engine Room Artificer Third Class William Clifford Nesbit, D/SMX.26 (Liverpool).
- Engine Room Artificer Third Class Stanley Gordon Pittock, C/MX.59898.
- Engine Room Artificer Edward Milburn Stephenson, X.2866 E.A. (Jarrow-on-Tyne).
- Engine Room Artificer Third Class Horace John Upfield, P/MX.51789 (Southsea).
- Engine Room Artificer Henry Thomas White, P/MX.78691.
- Engine Room Artificer Third Class Alfred Leonard Wright, P/MX.61392 (Camberwell).
- Electrical Artificer First Class Francis Hulme, C/M.37747 (London).
- Electrical Artificer Second Class George Cressey, C/MX.48495 (Portsmouth).
- Electrical Artificer Third Class Frank Leonard Batch, C/MX.60104 (Norwich).
- Electrical Artificer Third Class Frederick James Dodd, D/MX.51810 (Liverpool).
- Electrical Artificer Third Class William Lonsdale, D/MX.62508 (Burnley).
- Electrical Artificer Third Class William Joseph Richards, D/MX.60620 (Plymouth).
- Ordnance Artificer Third Class Gerance Banfield, D/MX.64419 (St. Ives, Cornwall).
- Ordnance Artificer Third Class John Ivimy Emery, C/MX.49235 (Cardiff).
- Ordnance Artificer Third Class Ernest Edward Hosking, D/MX.50887 (Carn Brea, Cornwall).
- Ordnance Artificer Third Class Leslie Palmer, D/MX.61486 (Portsmouth).
- Ordnance Artificer Third Class Arthur Rothwell, P/MX.62798 (Stalybridge).
- Ordnance Artificer Third Class William Smith, D/SR.16077 (Glasgow).
- Ordnance Artificer James Watchorn, C/MX.77379 (Didcot).
- Shipwright First Class Richard Dagger, C/MX.45785 (Chatham).
- Temporary Colour Sergeant (Acting Temporary Company Sergeant Major) Joseph Henry Warner, Royal Marines, Ch.23352 (Laindon, Essex).
- Quartermaster Sergeant Edgar Allan Lloyd, Royal Marines, Depot 677 (Bargoed, Glamorgan).
- Armourer Quartermaster Sergeant (Temporary) Harold Buckland, Royal Marines, Po.22414 (T) (Portsmouth).
- Colour Sergeant (Acting Temporary Quartermaster Sergeant) Horace Henry Budd, Royal Marines, Po.215048 (Gosport).
- Colour Sergeant (Acting Temporary Quartermaster Sergeant) Alfred George Eatwell, Royal Marines, Po.217002 (Eastney, Portsmouth).
- Sergeant (Acting Temporary Quartermaster Sergeant) Wilfred John Hayward, Royal Marines, Ch.X.1039 (London).
- Sergeant (Acting Temporary Quartermaster Sergeant) Douglas Ligertwood, Royal Marines, Po.X.1679 (Portsmouth).
- Corporal (Temporary) (Acting Temporary Quartermaster Sergeant) Leslie William Saunders, Royal Marines, Ch.X.102885 (Cheam).
- Colour Sergeant Thomas John Horsnell, Royal Marines, Ch.23094 (T) (Gillingham).
- Colour Sergeant William James Rowter, Royal Marines, Ply.20410 (Plymouth).
- Sergeant (Acting Temporary Colour Sergeant) George Kershaw Mouel, Royal Marines, Po.X.876 (Portsmouth).
- Corporal (Temporary) (Acting Temporary Colour Sergeant) George Alexander Beech, Royal Marines, Ch.X.100672 (Oxford).
- Corporal (Temporary) (Acting Temporary Colour Sergeant) Frederick Henry Woods, Royal Marines, Ex.1506 (Peacehaven).
- Petty Officer Thomas Anderson, LT/JX.241968 (Lowestoft).
- Petty Officer William Edmonds Box, D/J.105539 (St. Budeaux, Plymouth).
- Petty Officer William James Bradford, D/JX.159408 (Mountain Ash).
- Petty Officer Robert Leslie Bridges, P/JX.126404 (Gosport).
- Petty Officer Arthur George Brotchie, C/JX.136112 (Camberwell).
- Petty Officer John Campbell, LT/X.10672 (Lossiemouth).
- Petty Officer Daniel Connell, P/JX.141124 (Troqueer, Dumfries).
- Petty Officer Frank Charles Richard Cooke, C/JX.137105 (Middlesbrough).
- Petty Officer George James Cox, P/JX.125780 (Portsmouth).
- Petty Officer David Dickson, D/JX.150994 (Belfast).
- Petty Officer Harry Hall, D/JX.165824 (Cheadle).
- Petty Officer Torpedo Coxswain Ernest Edward Harrow, C/JX.135068.
- Petty Officer Frederick Gordon Harvey, D/JX.129682 (Newquay).
- Petty Officer Bert Benjamin Baker Marjoram, C/JX.137619.
- Petty Officer Harold Charles Daniel Martin, P/JX.126902.
- Petty Officer Reggie Samuel Munt, P/JX.159872 (Morden).
- Petty Officer Reginald James Theodore Thomas Payne, C/J.106374 (Wickford, Essex).
- Petty Officer Bertie Peart, DSM, C/J.111672 (Norwich).
- Petty Officer George Victor Rivett, D/J.47009.
- Petty Officer George William Robinson, C/J 113760 (Gillingham).
- Petty Officer Robert Scott, C/JX.128485 (Edinburgh).
- Petty Officer Edward Philip Snow, C/JX.139090 (Morden).
- Petty Officer Albion Charles Cyril Stone, P/J.H3382 (Swindon).
- Petty Officer William Henry Owen Stradling, C/JX.129947 (London).
- Petty Officer James Stanley Vickers, D/SSX.23054 (Hull).
- Petty Officer James Walker, D/J.93713 (Bradford).
- Petty Officer Joseph Walter Ward, D/JX.135472 (Newark).
- Petty Officer James Hector Warr, LT/X.18497 A. (Grimsby).
- Petty Officer Samuel Edward White, D/J 109769 (Saltash).
- Petty Officer Coxswain William Lindsay Williams, D/JX.158412 (Glasgow).
- Temporary Acting Petty Officer Henry Emmanuel Allen, C/JX.125014 (Gosport).
- Temporary Acting Petty Officer Sidney Brenton, P/SS.11025 (Ringwood, Hampshire).
- Temporary Acting Petty Officer John Briody, P/J.40604 (Blackpool).
- Temporary Acting Petty Officer Frederick James Alfred Bunton, C/JX.156446 (Edmonton).
- Temporary Acting Petty Officer David Edmund Butterworth, P/SSX.12332 (Earner).
- Temporary Acting Petty Officer William Alderson Calvert, C/JX.125636 (Sunderland).
- Temporary Petty Officer Joshua Albert Edward Carr, P/J.98774 (Ventnor, Isle of Wight).
- Temporary Acting Petty Officer Ernest George Cunningham, D/JX.181637 (Belfast).
- Temporary Acting Petty Officer Albert Dowse, D/BDX.1731 (Bristol).
- Temporary Petty Officer George Wilfred Drake, D/J.104956 (Tor Point).
- Temporary Petty Officer Harold Eves, C/SSX.17722 (Liverpool).
- Temporary Acting Petty Officer Jack Augustus William Jennings, P/JX.189616 (Stroud).
- Acting Petty Officer Douglas Lamb, C/JX.141082 (Durham).
- Temporary Acting Petty Officer William Henry Macdonald, C/X.18461 A. (Liverpool).
- Temporary Acting Petty Officer Cecil Marsden, P/JX.198292 (Wodverhampton).
- Acting Petty Officer Ronald Lester Martin, C/JX.179007 (London, SE.5).
- Temporary Petty Officer Stanley Rose, C/JX.151764 (Thundersley, Essex).
- Temporary Acting Petty Officer Richard Smith, D/JX.181591 (Belfast).
- Temporary Acting Petty Officer Josias Thompson Spence, D/JX.194817 (Duncarron).
- Acting Petty Officer Eric Reginald Taylor, C/SSX.30000 (Lincoln).
- Temporary Petty Officer Clifford Arthur Taylor, P/LD/X.4793 (Palmers Green, N.13).
- Temporary Acting Petty Officer Leonard William Trimmer, P/J.89458 (Manor Park, London).
- Temporary Petty Officer Herbert Samuel Michael Unsworth, P/JX.149243 (Bow, E.3).
- Temporary Petty Officer Leonard Wilkinson, D/SSX.18775 (Manchester).
- Temporary Acting Petty Officer George Edward Williams, P/JX.204892 (Coventry).
- Temporary Acting Petty Officer Walter Albert Kimberley Wise, P/SS.8374 (Reading).
- Yeoman of Signals David Michael Carrol, C/J. 28555 (Paddington).
- Yeoman of Signals George Charles Castle, D/J.31296 (St. Albans).
- Yeoman of Signals Christopher Alfred Plumb, C/SSX.31764 (London).
- Yeoman of Signals George Edward Voss, P/J.84390 (Southsea).
- Petty Officer Telegraphist James Hastings Stewart Fowler, C/JX.154327 (Runcorn).
- Petty Officer Telegraphist Edward Hatch, C/JX.138717 (Epsom).
- Petty Officer Telegraphist Sydney George Hicks, D/JX.143921 (Plymouth).
- Petty Officer Telegraphist James Richard Harrison Hodges, D/J.109468 (Douglas, Isle of Man).
- Petty Officer Telegraphist Lawrence Victor Howard, P/JX.148238 (South Shields).
- Petty Officer Telegraphist Cyril Dennis George Linkin, C/JX.133984 (Folkestone).
- Petty Officer Telegraphist Leonard Reed, C/JX.132753 (Iver Heath, Buckinghamshire).
- Petty Officer Telegraphist Jack Herbert Wilkes, P/J.108508 (Upper Heyford, Oxon.).
- Petty Officer Motor Mechanic William Henry Cox, D/MX.88099.
- Petty Officer Motor Mechanic Alfred John Roe, P/MX.98752 (Slough).
- Petty Officer Motor Mechanic Thomas Hulme, C/MX.77065 (Bolton).
- Petty Officer Motor Mechanic Fourth Class John Stone, D/MX.117083 (Salford).
- Acting Petty Officer Radio Mechanic James Frederick Hamilton, P/MX.102004 (Leeds).
- Acting Petty Officer Radio Mechanic John Heseltine, P/MX.101530 (Lancaster).
- Temporary Acting Petty Officer Radio Mechanic Ronald Roy Jennings, P/MX.98273 (Salisbury).
- Acting Petty Officer Radio Mechanic William Smith Leiper, P/MX.116311 (Wigg, Aberdeenshire).
- Acting Petty Officer Radio Mechanic Edward Mellor, P/MX.89767 (Huddersfield).
- Electrical Mechanician Fifth Class Bernard Grix, D/MX.74961.
- Engineman John Gray, LT/X.5985 E.S (Aberdeen).
- Engineman John William Harmer, LT/KX.106155 (Hull).
- Engineman David Wilfred Lanford, LT/KX.147417 (Birmingham).
- Stoker Petty Officer George Bater, D/KX.78256 (Skewen, Glamorganshire).
- Stoker Petty Officer Edgar Biggs, P/KX.84165 (Pontypool).
- Stoker Petty Officer William Ernest Davies, P/KX.82768 (Highley, Shropshire).
- Stoker Petty Officer Archibald Alfred Harriss, C/K.58342 (Barking).
- Stoker Petty Officer Cecil Alfred Hillyer, P/KX.89116 (Fareham).
- Temporary Stoker Petty Officer Arthur Kenneth McIntyre, C/KX.85132 (Manor Park, London).
- Stoker Petty Officer Frederick David Merrett, D/K.65301 (Bristol).
- Stoker Petty Officer Bernard Edward Thomas Millington, P/KX.79362 (Cotton in Elmes, Burton-on-Trent).
- Stoker Petty Officer Arthur Orlando Rampling, P/K.58721 (Lavenham, Suffolk).
- Stoker Petty Officer William Edgar Preston Rann, P/K.50146 (Ryde, Isle of Wight).
- Stoker Petty Officer Albert Henry Robertshaw, C/KX.90032 (Walderslade, Kent).
- Stoker Petty Officer George Rogers, D/KX.82194 (Plymouth).
- Stoker Petty Officer Percy Victor Withey, P/KX.84543 (Trowbridge).
- Temporary Stoker Petty Officer Robert Edgar, C/KX.77097 (Glasgow).
- Electrical Artificer Fourth Class Eric Arber, C/MX.67425 (Sheffield).
- Electrical Artificer Fourth Class Bruce Gervais Marshall Overton, D/MX.74030 (Porthcawl).
- Electrical Artificer Fourth Class Ernest George Alfred Walters, C/MX.73693 (Wood Green).
- Ordnance Artificer Fourth Class Wilfred Dunbavand, P/MX.62800 (Runcorn).
- Ordnance Artificer William John Webb, D/MX.64076 (Gloucester).
- Ordnance Mechanician Fourth Class John McCabe, P/MX.89011 (St. Helens).
- Shipwright Fourth Class Frank Arthur Knights, C/MX.77334 (Woodbridge, Sussex).
- Shipwright Fourth Class William Charles Le Breton, P/MX.78991 (Ironbridge, Shropshire).
- Sick Berth Petty Officer Henry Bibby, D/SBR./X.7203.
- Temporary Petty Officer Writer George William Plater, C/MX.66837 (South Shields).
- Supply Petty Officer Derrick Harold Allsopp, C/MX.59729 (Greenwich).
- Supply Petty Officer Cyril Alexander Cairns, C/KX.89129 (Woolwich).
- Supply Petty Officer George Ernest Wilkinson, P/MX.52715 (Portsmouth).
- Temporary Petty Officer Cook John Ceilings Crago, D/MX.50836 (Liskeard).
- Canteen Manager William Henry Chapman, NAAFI, C/NX.2660 (St. Ives, Huntingdonshire).
- Acting Temporary Sergeant William Harold Britton, Ply.21455 (Tiverton).
- Acting Temporary Sergeant John Stanley Brooke, Ch.24082 (Godstone, Surrey).
- Corporal (Temporary) (Acting Temporary Sergeant) Robert Kenneth Gray, Royal Marines, Ex.577 (Hull).
- Sergeant Edward Frederick Toop Hodges, Royal Marines, Ch.X.2. (Chatham).
- Sergeant Harold Ough, Royal Marines, Ply.X.1071 (Plymouth).
- Corporal (Temporary) (Acting Temporary Sergeant) Richard Henry Preston, Royal Marines, Ex.658 (Blackpool).
- Acting Temporary Sergeant Alfred Edward Sims, Ch./A.15348 (Rainham, Kent).
- Acting Temporary Sergeant Ernest Williams, Ch.24655 (Paignton).
- Acting Temporary Sergeant William Woodrow, Po.A.215367 (Leicester).
- Leading Seaman Eric Bennett, LT/JX.205624 (Bradford).
- Leading Seaman Henry Bloomfield, LT/JX.202353 (Warrington).
- Leading Seaman Peter Spink Cargill, LT/6071D. (Arbroath).
- Leading Seaman John Ernest Gamine, LT/JX.198823 (Shoreham).
- Leading Seaman John Carroll, LT/X.20170A, (Hull).
- Leading Seaman Raymond Merville Cresswell, LT/JX.253688 (Hemsworth, Yorkshire).
- Leading Seaman James Henry Gunn, L/SR.53753 (South Shields).
- Leading Seaman Alfred Frederick William Hales, LT/JX.232648 (Leytonstone).
- Leading Seaman William Buchan Hughes, LT/JX.183092 (Swansea).
- Leading Seaman John Richard Leadbetter, LT/JX.241820.
- Leading Seaman Harry Lister, LT/JX.198954 (Fleetwood).
- Leading Seaman Arthur Henry Little, D/JX.136242.
- Leading Seaman Alfred Sidney Lomath, C/JX.134278 (Glasgow).
- Leading Seaman Murdo MacDonald, LT/JX.210932 (Stornoway).
- Leading Seaman John Mackenzie, X.7262C (Stornoway).
- Leading Seaman Abraham Mitchley, C/J.41358 (St. Denys, Hampshire).
- Leading Seaman Thomas William North, LT/JX.170342 (Hull).
- Leading Seaman William Owen, LT/JX.187352.
- Leading Seaman Thomas Robert Readshaw, LT/JX.170671 (Douglas, Isle of Man).
- Leading Seaman Thomas Render, LT/JX.167134 (Hull).
- Leading Seaman James Hursel Rogers, LT/JX.185982 (Newfoundland).
- Leading Seaman Edwin Reubin Sellers, LT/JX.225742 (Scarborough).
- Leading Seaman D. Shaw, SANF(V) C/SA/67668 (East London, Cape Province, South Africa).
- Leading Seaman Arthur Sheppard, LT/JX.230235 (Bonavista Bay, Newfoundland).
- Leading Seaman Frederick Vale, P/JX.254103 (Manchester).
- Acting Temporary Leading Seaman Harold Beaver, D/J.53894 (Bristol).
- Acting Temporary Leading Seaman Douglas Ivan Butler, P/JX.142040 (Wool).
- Temporary Leading Seaman James Marcus Copping, P/JX.155618 (Chesterfield).
- Acting Leading Seaman Albert Edward Dally, D/JX.112473 (Cardiff).
- Temporary Acting Leading Seaman Francis Robert Drinkwater, P/JX.194622 (Great Barr, Birmingham).
- Acting Leading Seaman Thomas Duckworth, D/JX.238684 (Burnley).
- Acting Leading Seaman Kenneth Duckworth, P/SSX.25189.
- Temporary Acting Leading Seaman Alexander Duguid, C/JX.206053 (Aberdeen).
- Temporary Acting Leading Seaman Arthur Benjamin Dyson, D/J.88384 (Saundersfoot, South Wales).
- Temporary Acting Leading Seaman Frederick George Gardner, D/JX.213451 (Sidmouth).
- Temporary Leading Seaman Leslie Charles Hancock, D/JX.133843 (Rhymney, Monmouthshire).
- Acting Leading Seaman Hubert Hawkes, P/SSX.26052 (Doncaster).
- Acting Leading Seaman George Joseph, C/JX.291232 (Swansea).
- Temporary Acting Leading Seaman Charles James Impett, C/J.113962 (Liverpool).
- Temporary Acting Leading Seaman Donald Mitchell, D/JX.194670 (Shirehampton, Bristol).
- Acting Temporary Leading Seaman Walter Robinson, D/JX.157411 (Manchester).
- Acting Temporary Leading Seaman Thomas Stanley White, P/J.101292 (Teddington).
- Convoy Leading Signalman Leslie John Parsons, C/JX.269269 (Taunton).
- Temporary Leading Signalman Maurice Worthington Brice, P/JX.232320.
- Leading Telegraphist Albert Brown, C/J.52980 (Hastings).
- Leading Telegraphist Rennie Hull, P/JX.155686 (Edlington, near Doncaster).
- Leading Telegraphist Leonard George Payne, P/J.100388 (Fareham).
- Leading Radio Mechanic William Kenneth Philp, P/MX.89533 (Markinch, Fifeshire).
- Leading Stoker Thomas Joseph Hyland, D/K.62325 (Stonehouse, Plymouth).
- Leading Stoker Ronald William Spencer, P/KX.104644 (Hook).
- Leading Stoker Henry Charles Willoughby, P/KX.95392 (Bradfield, Berkshire).
- Temporary Leading Stoker Sydney Albert Lyford, P/K.50244 (Andover).
- Temporary Acting Leading Stoker David Thomas Steer, D/SS.123381 (Plymouth).
- Acting Leading Stoker Robert Edward Ward, D/KX.91314.
- Acting Temporary Leading Stoker Elmer Charles Worsley, D/KX.115056 (Wickwar, Gloucestershire).
- Acting Leading Stoker Graham Thomas Wyatt, D/KX.115275 (Aylesbury).
- Blacksmith Fourth Class Leonard Timothy Berwick, C/MX.70086 (Stourport-on-Severn).
- Temporary Leading Writer Robert John Bain Mowat, P/MX.106590 (Dingwall, Rossshire).
- Temporary Leading Supply Assistant Richard Walter Kemp, D/MX.66800 (Chippenham).
- Leading Supply Assistant Ernest James Sidders, C/MX.61217 (Cleveland Acol, near Margate).
- Temporary Leading Steward Alexander Henry White, C/LX.23151 (Bromley).
- Leading Cook Michael Richard Groucher, LT/MX.87174 (Shepherd's Bush).
- Leading Cook Stanley Twidell, P/MX.60575 (Sevenoaks).
- Marine (Acting Temporary Corporal) Robert Robinson Fletcher, Royal Marines, Po.X.102510 (Cassle, Yorkshire).
- Marine (Acting Temporary Corporal) William Raymond Dennis Hugh, Royal Marines, Ply.X.120105 (Llanelly).
- Temporary Corporal Herbert Norman Lane, Royal Marines, Ch.X.102838 (Surbiton).
- Corporal (Temporary) Edwin Moorhouse, Royal Marines, Po.X.3998 (Preston).
- Corporal (Temporary) Leslie Arthur Peck, Royal Marines, Ch.X.1680 (Woodbridge).
- Able Seaman John William Adams, C/J.113088 (Scarborough).
- Able Seaman Edmund Boyce, D/J.26985 (Shepton Mallet, Somerset).
- Able Seaman Francis Budd, D/J.106133 (Bishop Stortford).
- Able Seaman Dennis Edward Burrin, C/JX.373710 (Edgware).
- Able Seaman William Leonard Clements, C/J.92467 (Lamberhurst, Kent).
- Able Seaman Eddie Julian Dallimore, P/JX.388462 (Reading).
- Able Seaman Arthur Edward Foulger, C/J.105922.
- Able Seaman Percy Stephen Gardiner, C/SSX.12363 (Malvern).
- Able Seaman Gerald Leofric Goss, D/J.95872 (Plymouth).
- Able Seaman Christopher Edward Hawkes, P/JX.290744 (London).
- Able Seaman Stanley Cecil Hawkins, P/J.101295 (Oxford).
- Able Seaman Edward Rayner Hills, D/JX.246523 (London, SE.4).
- Able Seaman Joseph Leslie Howard, D/JX.256404 (Grimsby).
- Able Seaman Lewis Hutchinson, D/JX.257704.
- Able Seaman William Jolly, P/J.47817 (Acomb, Yorkshire).
- Able Seaman Percival Robert Kelly, C/J.76284 (Highbury, London).
- Able Seaman Henry Thomas Keywood, P/J.14233.
- Able Seaman Frederick James McIver, D/X.19233 A. (West Hartlepool).
- Able Seaman Francis Henry Northcott, D/J.108175 (Plymouth).
- Able Seaman Edward Ernest Perry, C/JX.310048 (Leytonstone).
- Able Seaman Sydney Arthur Ernest Pitt, C/JX.319727 (Biggin Hill).
- Able Seaman Russell Edmond Pontifex, C/JX.202995 (Coulsdon).
- Able Seaman Victor John Rea, D/JX.186917 (Edinburgh).
- Able Seaman Kenneth Walter Rosling, D/JX.202882.
- Able Seaman Frederick Redvers Sheerson, D/J.79201 (Caerleon, Monmouthshire).
- Able Seaman Sidney Steere, D/JX.284782 (Cardiff).
- Able Seaman Charles Alfred Symer, P/JX.223947 (London, W.12).
- Able Seaman Joseph Whittingham, C/JX.277204.
- Temporary Able Seaman John Protheroe Boon Snary, C/JS.2225.
- Temporary Able Seaman (Lieutenant Colonel, Retd) Charles Percival Fenwick Warton, C/JS.2217.
- Convoy Signalman John Francis Madden, C/JX.226576 (Peckham).
- Convoy Signalman Bertie Harold Pryor, C/JX.233745 (Chiswick).
- Signalman Frederick Eric Birkinshaw, LT/JX.176255.
- Signalman Kenneth Morgan Davies, LT/JX.204957 (Birmingham).
- Signalman Henry Cecil Housego, LT/JX.274527 (Greenford, Middlesex).
- Signalman George Mance Raine, LT/JX.220689 (Sheffield).
- Signalman John George Robson, D/J.73197 (St. Albans).
- Signalman John Barren Taylor, D/JX.187931 (Blackpool).
- Telegraphist Albert Henry Arnold, P/SSX.26962 (Stoke Newington).
- Telegraphist George Arthur Edwin Broad, LT/JX.298565 (Baling).
- Telegraphist Patrick Terence Burns, C/JX.321775 (Pontefract).
- Telegraphist Frederick Collins, LT/JX.169682 (Manchester).
- Telegraphist Rowland Ernest Fairweather, P/JX.231119.
- Telegraphist John Murdoch Henry, C/WRX.687 (Clydebank).
- Telegraphist Bertie Jarvis, C/JX.282154 (Leicester).
- Telegraphist John Thomas Skeldon, P/J.111165 (Whitley Bay).
- Telegraphist Hugh Walker, LT/JX.190853 (Falkirk).
- Stoker First Class Richard Allen, C/KX.151390 (Catford).
- Stoker First Class George Henry Berry, P/SS.125647 (Stratford, E.15).
- Stoker First Class Richard Bowerbank, C/KX.123553 (Blackburn).
- Stoker First Class James William Reginald Channing, P/KX.133487 (Shanklin, Isle of Wight).
- Stoker First Class Allan Haywood, D/KX.151284 (Darwen, Lancashire).
- Stoker First Class George William Honey, D/KX.113710.
- Stoker First Class Geoffrey Francis Raymond Potter, D/KX.104089 (Bristol).
- Stoker First Class Robert Stewart, C/KX.138155.
- Stoker First Class Bernard Townend, D/KX.132257 (Roughlee, Lancashire).
- Sick Berth Attendant Henry Thomas Meek Brown, C/MX.83884 (Foley, Oxon).
- Sick Berth Attendant Geoffrey Alan Cowin, P/MX.109266 (Marown, Isle of Man).
- Sick Berth Attendant James Henry Waterworth, D/SBR/X.7642 (Brierfield, Lancashire).
- Supply Assistant Richard John Glover, C/MX.67616 (Abington).
- Steward Roy Anderson Buchanan, P/LX.26480 (Sion Mills, Tyrone).
- Steward Walter Henry Purcell, LT/LX.29388 (London, EC.1).
- Steward Frederick William Walter Chartres, LT/LX.27506 (Finsbury Park, N.4).
- Wireman William Thomas Haslam, D/JX.168313 (Dagenham).
- Wireman Kenneth William Page, C/MX.96561 (Tottenham).
- Seaman Robert James Boyd, LT/JX.174480 (Douglas, Isle of Man).
- Seaman Joseph Clayton, LT/JX.299322 (Stockport).
- Seaman John Jones, LT/JX.187332 (Heswall, Cheshire).
- Seaman John Dennis Mason, LT/JX.256015 (Liverpool).
- Seaman William Davies, LT/JX.190120 (Llanelly).
- Seaman Glyndwr Newman, LT/JX.240615 (Belfast).
- Seaman Kenneth Smith, LT/X.18297 A (Stornoway).
- Seaman Haydn Thomas, LT/JX.221385 (Llanelly).
- Seaman Nathan Percey, LT/JX.195272 (Concepcion Bay, Newfoundland).
- Seaman John Moms, LT/JX.199033 (Aberdeen).
- Seaman Daniel Patrick Lynch, LT/JX.225765 (Deptford).
- Seaman Percy Holland, LT/JX.202041 (Boston, Lincolnshire).
- Seaman George Blythe Thomas, LT/JX.243040 (Choppington, Northumberland).
- Seaman Sydney Charles Hill, LT/JX.179323 (Market Harborough).
- Seaman Hiram Thomas Rideout, LT/JX.246634 (Newfoundland).
- Seaman Joseph Donovan, LT/JX.283405.
- Seaman William Rowland Bisset, LT/JX.216239 (Sydenham).
- Seaman John Thomas Bennett, LT/JX.315683 (Codrory, Newfoundland).
- Ordinary Signalman Herbert Edward George Troke, P/JX.343493 (Bournemouth).
- Stoker Thomas Ivor Cavell Anthony, LT/KX.103338 (Haverfordwest).
- Stoker Robert George Sparkes, LT/KX.126931 (Belvedere, Kent).
- Stoker Harry King, LT/KX.168014 (Tonypandy).
- Coder William Watchman Blakeborough, C/JX.293176 (Leeds).
- Coder Mortimer Cowling, C/JX.229660 (Grimsby).
- Coder Charles Hill Harrison, D/JX.251593.
- Coder Cyril Uttley, C/JX.199677 (Manchester).
- Marine (Lance Corporal) John George Ernest Lynn, Royal Marines, Po.X.103856 (Brighton).
- Marine Donald Finlay, Royal Marines, Ch.24146 (T) (Castle Bromwich).
- Marine Gwyn Meredith Haddrell, Royal Marines, Po.X.107177 (T) (Treherbert).
- Marine Fred Slade, Royal Marines, Ply.X.109444 (Stoke-on-Trent).
- Marine Arthur Stanley Ballard, Royal Marines, Ch.X.102452 (Thames Ditton).
- Marine Maurice Wombell, Royal Marines, Ch.X.102381 (Mansfield).

=== Royal Red Cross (RRC) ===
Royal Navy
...for out-standing zeal, patience & cheerfulness and for courage and wholehearted devotion to duty in HM Naval Hospitals in the last six months or more of war...

- Ailleen Marjorie Taylor, ARRC, Acting Matron, Queen Alexandra's Royal Naval Nursing Service.
- Kathleen Margaret Cooper, ARRC, Acting Matron, Queen Alexandra's Royal Naval Nursing Service.

Army

- Nancy Patricia de Beauvois Bampton, Sister (acting Matron) (206030), Queen Alexandra's Imperial Military Nursing Service.
- Olive Emily Clark, Sister (acting Matron) (206063), Queen Alexandra's Imperial Military Nursing Service.
- Sister Doris Dulake, Sister (acting Matron) (206111), Queen Alexandra's Imperial Military Nursing Service.
- Isabella Bingham Hazlett, Sister (acting Matron) (206207), Queen Alexandra's Imperial Military Nursing Service.
- Mabel Haufleur Joyce, Matron (218264), Queen Alexandra's Imperial Military Nursing Service.
- Margaret Phoebe Northrop, Sister (acting Matron) (206350), Queen Alexandra's Imperial Military Nursing Service.
- Florence Mary Percival, Sister (acting Matron) (206380), Queen Alexandra's Imperial Military Nursing Service.
- Elizabeth Sanger, Matron (206436), Queen Alexandra's Imperial Military Nursing Service.
- Christina Fowler Fraser, Sister (acting Matron) (206144), Queen Alexandra's Imperial Military Nursing Service Reserve.
- Janet Balderston Campbell Orchardson, Matron (221510), Territorial Army Nursing Service.
- Ann Forsyth Thorn, Matron (215005), Territorial Army Nursing Service.
- Edith Mary Lewis, Matron (42593), New Zealand Army Nursing Service.
- Margaret McLeod Matheson, Sister (temporary Matron) (255217), South African Military Nursing Service.

Royal Air Force

- Matron Maud Harriette Adamson, ARRC, Princess Mary's Royal Air Force Nursing Service.
- Matron Elsie Madeline Clements, ARRC, Princess Mary's Royal Air Force Nursing Service.

==== Bar to the Royal Red Cross ====
- Matilda Goodrich, RRC, Principal Matron, Queen Alexandra's Royal Naval Nursing Service.
- Dame Katharine Henrietta Jones, DBE, RRC, (206237), Queen Alexandra's Imperial Military Nursing Service.

==== Associate of the Royal Red Cross (ARRC) ====
Royal Navy

- Eva Doris Bishop, Acting Principal Matron, Queen Alexandra's Royal Naval Nursing Service.
- Margaret Frances Maxwell Trimble, Acting Matron, Queen Alexandra's Royal Naval Nursing Service.
- Phyllis Mary Wilkinson, Acting Principal Matron, Queen Alexandra's Royal Naval Nursing Service.
- Irene Kathleen Coleman, Senior Sister, Queen Alexandra's Royal Naval Nursing Service.
- Gertrude Annie Ramsden, Nursing Sister (Reserve), Queen Alexandra's Royal Naval Nursing Service.
- Dorothy Esther Tope, Nursing Sister (Reserve), Queen Alexandra's Royal Naval Nursing Service.
- Cicely Hollis Ewens, Nursing Sister (Reserve). Queen Alexandra's Royal Naval Nursing Service.
- Mary Weetman, Nursing Sister (Reserve), Queen Alexandra's Royal Naval Nursing Service.
- Elizabeth Ann Brock, Supervising V.A.D Nursing Member.
- Violet Morrison, Supervising V.A.D Nursing Member.

Army

- Margaret Ashmore, Nursing Officer (206551), Queen Alexandra's Imperial Military Nursing Service.
- Marjorie Clark, Nursing Officer (206092), Queen Alexandra's Imperial Military Nursing Service.
- Doris Elethea Sybil Conley, Sister (206830), Queen Alexandra's Imperial Military Nursing Service.
- Gwendolen Nancy Evans, Sister (206141), Queen Alexandra's Imperial Military Nursing Service.
- Margaret Winter Milne Glass, Sister (temporary Matron) (239764), Queen Alexandra's Imperial Military Nursing Service.
- Coralie Josephine Jeboult Jones, Sister (assistant Matron) (206244), Queen Alexandra's Imperial Military Nursing Service.
- Gladys Murray, Sister (assistant Matron) (206320), Queen Alexandra's Imperial Military Nursing Service.
- Henrietta Hope Tuissant, Sister (274159), Queen Alexandra's Imperial Military Nursing Service.
- Helen Margaret Buchanan, Sister (241796), Queen Alexandra's Imperial Military Nursing Service Reserve.
- Gertrude Carruthers, Sister in Charge (206069), Queen Alexandra's Imperial Military Nursing Service Reserve.
- Margaret Elizabeth Low Soutar Clark, Sister (206873), Queen Alexandra's Imperial Military Nursing Service Reserve.
- Ellen Annie Davies, Sister (acting Matron) (231365), Queen Alexandra's Imperial Military Nursing Service Reserve.
- Olive Mary Liddell Davies, Sister (206992), Queen Alexandra's Imperial Military Nursing Service Reserve.
- Brenda Hazelby Edwards, (238151), Queen Alexandra's Imperial Military Nursing Service Reserve.
- Sheila Saisie Raebura, Sister (209158), Queen Alexandra's Imperial Military Nursing Service Reserve.
- Winifred Waite, Sister (assistant Matron) (209474), Queen Alexandra's Imperial Military Nursing Service Reserve.
- Jessie Wilson, Sister (209456), Queen Alexandra's Imperial Military Nursing Service Reserve.
- Euphemia Maclean, Nursing Officer (213909), Territorial Army Nursing Service.
- Edith Mary Rawlins, Sister (215302), Territorial Army Nursing Service.
- Alice Alexandra Smith, Sister (215476), Territorial Army Nursing Service.
- Jean Thomson, Sister (236240), Territorial Army Nursing Service.
- Joy Willard Bannister, Nursing Officer, East Africa Military Nursing Service.
- Dorothy, Mary Field, Sister, Burma Hospital Corps.
- Joyce Trevelyn Sexton, Charge Sister, New Zealand Military Nursing Service.

Royal Air Force

- Senior Sister Pauline Giles, Princess Mary's Royal Air Force Nursing Service.
- Acting Senior Sister Margery Reid Campbell, Princess Mary's Royal Air Force Nursing Service.
- Acting Senior Sister Mary Ross Gall, Princess Mary's Royal Air Force Nursing Service.
- Acting Senior Sister Annie Katherine Macfie, Princess Mary's Royal Air Force Nursing Service.
- Acting Senior Sister Gwendoline Patty Taylor, Princess Mary's Royal Air Force Nursing Service.
- Sister Isabel Mary Lavina Barnes, Princess Mary's Royal Air Force Nursing Service.
- Sister Florence Eddy, Princess Mary's Royal Air Force Nursing Service.
- Sister Helen Mary Jones, Princess Mary's Royal Air Force Nursing Service.

=== Honorary Chaplain to His Majesty ===
- The Reverend Denis Beauchamp Lisle Foster, MA, Chaplain to the Forces, 1st Class, Royal Army Chaplains' Department.

=== King's Commendation for Valuable Service in the Air ===
United Kingdom

- Captain William Armstrong, British Overseas Airways Corporation.
- James Rowland Fraser, Radio Officer, No. 45 Atlantic Transport Group, Royal Air Force.
- James Ernest Giles, Radio Officer, British Overseas Airways Corporation.
- Captain Clive Beckingham Houlder, British Overseas Airways Corporation.
- Captain Anthony Christopher Loraine, British Overseas Airways Corporation.
- Alton Myles Loughridge, Radio Officer No. 45 Trans-Atlantic Group, Royal Air Force.
- Captain William Floyd Sheldon Luck, No. 45 Atlantic Transport Group, Royal Air Force.
- John Donald McIntyre, Radio Officer, No. 45 Atlantic Transport Group, Royal Air Force.
- Captain James Tait Percy, British Overseas Airways Corporation.
- Captain Frederick Dudley Travers, DFC, British Overseas Airways Corporation.
- Captain Raymond Ivor Burgess Winn, British Overseas Airways Corporation.

Royal Air Force
Acting Wing Commander

- V. W. Soltau (18185).

Squadron Leaders

- I. M. Gundry-White (39660).
- L. E. Headley (70292), RAFVR.
- F. V. Lister (74720), RAFVR.
- D. F. H. Smith (40759).
- J. D. Wood (70747), RAFVR.

Acting Squadron Leaders

- R. S. Blake (37274).
- K. Hensman (80026), RAFVR.
- L. J. Hill (41584)
- C. H. Prince (80025), RAFVR.
- D. H. Stuart (42159).

Flight Lieutenants

- E. Bowen (48650).
- G. H. Bridges (45644).
- W. Cummins (46775).
- G. H. Duncan (82217), RAFVR.
- F. C. Ferguson (116150), RAFVR.
- N. B. Freeman (82697), RAFVR.
- A. E. Hall (45679).
- O. C. Horton (121465), RAFVR.
- J. Keegan (86385), RAFVR.
- E. E. Morris (88196), RAFVR.
- G. Rees (43254).
- F. G. Woosnam-Mills (111775), RAFVR.

Acting Flight Lieutenants

- F. Beswick (119350), RAFVR.
- W. F. Garnham (142595), RAFVR.
- K. F. J. Parfitt (118176), RAFVR.
- W. G. Shearer (141528), RAFVR.
- B. A. Timmings (129932), RAFVR.

Flying Officers

- A. D. Burt (49994).
- H. Griffin (134524), RAFVR.
- J. F. Haffenden (136039), RAFVR.
- S. Hamilton (51833).
- A. G. Jesseman (60132), RAFVR.
- G. E. R. Parr (50282)
- D. J. Williams (162942), RAFVR.

Pilot Officers

- R. Fender (170125), RAFVR.
- J. Varty (162943), RAFVR.

Warrant Officer

- N. D. Wilkinson (656059).

Flight Sergeants

- 1330376 J. F. Dell, RAFVR.
- 620817 H. W. B. Greetham.
- 1314410 J. E. Toomer, RAFVR (deceased).

Sergeant

- 1196145 V. F. Pearce, RAFVR.

Corporals

- 1087375 C. C. Lamb, RAFVR.
- 646301 J. E. H. Ritch.

Royal Australian Air Force
Squadron Leaders

- E. R. Griffiths (Aus.260440).
- D. M. Johnstone (Aus.260436).

Acting Squadron Leaders

- C. T. G. Lister (Aus.2605).
- C. W. Sawley (Aus.282303).

Flight Lieutenants

- A. J. R. Duffield (Aus.251431).
- J. N. McBride (Aus.407485).
- J. R. Mowbray (Aus.405417).
- A. J. A. O'Donnell (Aus.407588).
- A. J. Sharp, DFC, (Aus.402140).

Flying Officer

- H. J. Farley (Aus.402906).
- A. D. McKellar (Aus.421925).

Warrant Officer

- J. Jamieson (Aus.400675).

Royal Canadian Air Force
Flying Officers

- W. M. Arbuckle (Can/J.17202).
- J. M. Daniels (Can/J.20462).
- R. A. Gilberstad (Can/J.16352).
- L. B. Wyman (Can/J.106131).

Pilot Officer

- G. T. Parkinson (Can/J.38604).

Royal New Zealand Air Force
Flying Officer

- J. McLachlan (N.Z.404390).

South African Air Force
Captain

- S. L. Love (103594).

Southern Rhodesian Air Force
Flight Lieutenant

- J. McAdam.

=== King's Commendation for Brave Conduct ===
Royal Air Force
Flying Officer

- J. H. P. Wynton (49335).

Pilot Officer

- R. H. Durham (143684), RAFVR.

Flight Sergeant

- 509938 K. C. Matthews.

Sergeant

- 943051 A. Liudzius, RAFVR.

Corporals

- 1178198 S. J. Beswick, RAFVR.
- 1055219 J. Hilditch, RAFVR (deceased).
- 1650343 C. S. Horne, RAFVR.
- 1368256 G. Jardine, RAFVR.

Leading Aircraftmen

- 870935 C. Blythe, Auxiliary Air Force.
- 1253735 A. J. T. Buss, RAFVR.

Aircraftman 1st Class

- 1279173 H. R. Phillips, RAFVR, (deceased).

Aircraftman 2nd Class

- 1860769 W. H. Gittins, RAFVR.

Royal Australian Air Force
Flight Lieutenant

- L. E. B. Rogers (Aus.402400).

Sergeant

- Aus.413123 K. M. Hudson.

Corporal

- Aus.17963 L. V. Roberts.

Leading Aircraftman

- Aus.16122 F. H. Bolton.

Indian Air Force
Naik

- B. N. Banerjee (0278).

Lance Naik

- N. Sen (6069).

=== Air Force Cross (AFC) ===
Royal Air Force

- Group Captain John Darey Baker-Carr.
- Acting Group Captain Alfred Mulock Bentley.
- Acting Group Captain Christopher Clarkson, Reserve of Air Force Officers.
- Wing Commander Basil Archie Coventry (39224).
- Wing Commander Edward Michael Morris (28206).
- Wing Commander Charles Sandford Wynne-Eyton, DSO, (09186).
- Acting Wing Commander Clifford Cockcroft Barker, MB, ChB, (23304).
- Acting Wing Commander Philipp Richardson Crompton, DFC, (72250), RAFVR.
- Acting Wing Commander Peter Dobson, DFC, (64824), RAFVR.
- Acting Wing Commander John Douglas Richard Forbes (43630).
- Acting Wing Commander George Augustus Erskine Harkness (27057).
- Acting Wing Commander Philip William Dunstan Heal (90220), Auxiliary Air Force.
- Acting Wing Commander Humphrey de Verd Leigh, OBE, DFC, (74528), RAFVR.
- Acting Wing Commander Ronald Lloyd, DFC, (33321).
- Acting Wing Commander George Raymond Nottage (44566).
- Acting Wing Commander Joseph Roy George Ralston, DSO, DFM, (47650).
- Acting Wing Commander Anthony Hartwell Rook, DFC, (90071), Auxiliary Air Force.
- Acting Wing Commander Harold Constantine Smith, DFM, (44824).
- Acting Wing Commander John Lawrence Waters (39262).
- Acting Wing Commander Edward Walpole Whitaker, DFC, (40971).
- Squadron Leader James Reginald Ayling (27072), Reserve of Air Force Officers.
- Squadron Leader James Herbert Sydney Broughton (40880), Reserve of Air Force Officers.
- Squadron Leader Clarence Judge Callingham (40206), Reserve of Air Force Officers.
- Squadron Leader Denis Anderson Rea (70566), Reserve of Air Force Officers.
- Squadron Leader Richard Eric Stevenson (70648), Reserve of Air Force Officers.
- Squadron Leader John William Jameson Truran (70682), Reserve of Air Force Officers.
- Acting Squadron Leader Roy Bailey (43828).
- Acting Squadron Leader Colin Norman Birch (41519), Reserve of Air Force Officers.
- Acting Squadron Leader Jack Brain (41661), Reserve of Air Force Officers.
- Acting Squadron Leader Leslie Harold Talbot Cliff (78720), RAFVR.
- Acting Squadron Leader Anthony Da Costa (86409), RAFVR.
- Acting Squadron Leader Frederick Bertram Everest (43940).
- Acting Squadron Leader Norman Hearn-Phillips, DFM, (45615).
- Acting Squadron Leader Joseph William Ernest Holmes, DFC, (114291), RAFVR.
- Acting Squadron Leader John Arthur Ingham, DFC, (81355), RAFVR.
- Acting Squadron Leader Dudley Graham Johnson (76306), RAFVR.
- Acting Squadron Leader Geoffrey Dawson Lane (60560), RAFVR.
- Acting Squadron Leader Douglas Leatherland (85674), RAFVR.
- Acting Squadron Leader Michael Dillon Lyne (33431). Royal Air Force.
- Acting Squadron Leader Gordon Montague Merrifield (73006), RAFVR.
- Acting Squadron Leader Hayden Hugh James Miller, DFC, (43041).
- Acting Squadron Leader John Henry Nassau Molesworth, DFC, (80828), RAFVR.
- Acting Squadron Leader Harold Charles Morris, GM, (44773).
- Acting Squadron Leader Richard Lawrence Leach McCullough, DFC, (44052).
- Acting Squadron Leader Edgar Sheppard Stow Nash, DFC, (42354).
- Acting Squadron Leader Thomas Roberts Russell, DFC, (100614), RAFVR.
- Acting Squadron Leader George Wardrop Scott (62257), RAFVR.
- Acting Squadron Leader William John Thomas Smith (45189).
- Acting Squadron Leader Richard Paul Todd, DFC, (88690), RAFVR.
- Acting Squadron Leader Joseph Charles Wheeler (43365).
- Flight Lieutenant Arthur Ian Albertson (80126), RAFVR.
- Flight Lieutenant Edmund Eugene Allen (45355).
- Flight Lieutenant John Sidney Andrews (83686).
- Flight Lieutenant Charles Ripley Bogle (102615), RAFVR.
- Flight Lieutenant John Cartwright (113839), RAFVR.
- Flight Lieutenant John Harry Cater (86675), RAFVR.
- Flight Lieutenant Geoffrey Collinson (86627), RAFVR.
- Flight Lieutenant Frank William Cook (45095).
- Flight Lieutenant Peter James Darke (82694), RAFVR.
- Flight Lieutenant Frederick Gait de Sieyes (42813).
- Flight Lieutenant Frank Leslie Dodd (89766), RAFVR.
- Flight Lieutenant Eric Stanley Few (83246), RAFVR.
- Flight Lieutenant Kenneth Fisher (108959), RAFVR.
- Flight Lieutenant Godfrey Ian Hutchinson (62012), RAFVR.
- Flight Lieutenant Prince Michael Imeretinsky (78190), RAFVR.
- Flight Lieutenant John Kenneth Jackson (102057), RAFVR.
- Flight Lieutenant Geoffrey Wenham Jarman (86718), RAFVR.
- Flight Lieutenant Jocelin Laverton (109982), RAFVR.
- Flight Lieutenant Arthur Douglas Meredith (62651), RAFVR.
- Flight Lieutenant Raymond Allan Pegler (46785).
- Flight Lieutenant Patrick William Percy (109140), RAFVR.
- Flight Lieutenant Robert George Walter Plutte, DFC, (104533), RAFVR.
- Flight Lieutenant Harold Quittenden (76926), RAFVR.
- Flight Lieutenant James Robinson (47845).
- Flight Lieutenant Raymond Frederick Sellers (11124), RAFVR.
- Flight Lieutenant Herbert Scott Sewell, DFC, (86667), RAFVR.
- Flight Lieutenant John Arthur George Sizmur (123466), RAFVR.
- Flight Lieutenant Alfred Arthur Smith (103052), RAFVR.
- Flight Lieutenant David John Thacker (85273), RAFVR.
- Flight Lieutenant Reginald Heber Thomas (48325).
- Flight Lieutenant Leonard Alfred Wells (66606), RAFVR.
- Flight Lieutenant John Granville Ginder Wilkinson (61233), RAFVR.
- Flight Lieutenant William Legard Woodcock (119500), RAFVR.
- Acting Flight Lieutenant James Lawrence Anderton (122994), RAFVR.
- Acting Flight Lieutenant James Robert Wade Blyth (115103), RAFVR.
- Acting Flight Lieutenant William Brayton Cowman (45742).
- Acting Flight Lieutenant John Harold Eshelby (124746), RAFVR.
- Acting Flight Lieutenant Richard Garfield Galloway (45680).
- Acting Flight Lieutenant Dudley Brian Graeme (66598), RAFVR.
- Acting Flight Lieutenant Reginald Charles George Harman, AFM, (44880).
- Acting Flight Lieutenant Ernest Donald McLean Hicham (43469).
- Acting Flight Lieutenant Kenneth Bruce Hollowell (113338), RAFVR.
- Acting Flight Lieutenant Charles Gordon Killpack (101058), RAFVR.
- Acting Flight Lieutenant Mervyn Henry Parry (63850), RAFVR.
- Flying Officer William Thomas Benstead (126713), RAFVR.
- Flying Officer Ronald George Brown (128366), RAFVR.
- Flying Officer Harold Edwin Davis (50102), RAFVR.
- Flying Officer Thomas John German (162956), RAFVR.
- Flying Officer Norman Glaholm, DFM, (143376), RAFVR.
- Flying Officer William Price Griffiths (139488), RAFVR.
- Flying Officer Edward William Foott Hewett (49250).
- Flying Officer Geoffrey George Holtom (145327), RAFVR.
- Flying Officer John Roy Lake (51282).
- Flying Officer Stanley Douglas Walbank (145663), RAFVR.
- Pilot Officer Ronald Allen (168831), RAFVR.
- Pilot Officer Norman Charles Blackband (170204), RAFVR.
- Pilot Officer Kenneth John Marshall (169576), RAFVR.
- Pilot Officer Andrew Mathieson (172140), RAFVR.
- Pilot Officer Henry O'Neill (168837), RAFVR.
- Pilot Officer Harold Kent Richardson (53972).
- Warrant Officer Guy Stuart Batchelor (748572), Royal. Air Force Volunteer Reserve.
- Warrant Officer Charles Frederick Blake (740150), RAFVR.
- Warrant Officer Lewis Samares Dimaresq (905759), RAFVR.
- Acting Warrant Officer Erroll Minter (743637), RAFVR.
- Acting Warrant Officer Gerard Francis Turnbull (938944), RAFVR.

Royal Australian Air Force

- Acting Squadron Leader John Keith Douglas, DFC, (Aus.403564).
- Acting Squadron Leader Gordon Donald Graham (Aus.404910).
- Flight Lieutenant Edward Anzac Duplex, DFC, (Aus.400142).

Royal Canadian Air Force

- Acting Squadron Leader John Edward McCormack, DFC, (Can./J.6136).
- Flight Lieutenant Donald Ian McQueen Fink (Can./J.4257).
- Flight Lieutenant Lyle George William Jarvis (Can./J.8320)
- Acting Flight Lieutenant Athur Adelbert Bishop, DFM, (Can./J.15819).
- Flying Officer Raymond Boyd Hart (Can./J.10759).

Royal New Zealand Air Force

- Flight Lieutenant Allan John Price (N.Z.413176).
- Flying Officer Thomas Alexander (N.Z.413800).

South African Air Force

- Major Walter Ralph Bryden (48055).

Indian Air Force

- Acting Flight Lieutenant Dinshaw Ferozeshan Eduljee (1669).

Royal Australian Air Force.

- Wing Commander Ian Percy Albert Allen.
- Wing Commander James Andrew Hepburn, DFC.
- Squadron Leader Derek Randal Cuming.
- Squadron Leader David Fotheringham Miller.

Royal New Zealand Air Force

- Acting Wing Commander Arthur Candlish Allen.
- Squadron Leader Ernest William Barnett.
- Flight Lieutenant William Bernard Pettett.

==== Bar to Air Force Cross ====
- Acting Group Captain Vivian Reginald Moon, AFC.
- Wing Commander William Joseph Scott, AFC, (28117).
- Flight Lieutenant Frederick Arthur Rickaby, AFC, (100041), RAFVR.

==== Second Bar to Air Force Cross ====
- Wing Commander Hugh Joseph Wilson, AFC, (28170).

=== Air Force Medal ===
Royal Air Force

- 1314140 Flight Sergeant Desmond Clarke, RAFVR.
- 1320435 Flight Sergeant William Charles Dallimore, RAFVR.
- 923999 Flight Sergeant Theodore George Arthur Davis, RAFVR.
- 620573 Flight Sergeant Thomas William Donoghue.
- 701893 Flight Sergeant Richard Charles Dunlop, RAFVR.
- 656948 Flight Sergeant George Henry Griggs.
- 1165631 Flight Sergeant Claude Morley Houghton, RAFVR.
- 541332 Flight Sergeant Matthew McGiniley.
- 1313716 Flight Sergeant Frederick Myers, RAFVR.
- 551563 Flight Sergeant George Rollings.
- 1202230 Flight Sergeant Robert Dennis Smart, RAFVR.
- 1273298 Sergeant Alfred George Burton, RAFVR.
- 1343724 Sergeant John Carlyle Sheppard, RAFVR.
- 627473 Sergeant Arthur James Sutton.
- 627471 Sergeant Derek Bruce Edgar Weller.
- 636093 Corporal William Alfred John Richards.
- 1116212 Leading Aircraftman Leonard William Ashton, RAFVR.
- Aus.402431 Sergeant John Jamieson Wilson, Royal Australian Air Force

=== King's Police and Fire Services Medal (KPFSM) ===
For Gallantry

- James Arthur Cole, Sub-Divisional Inspector, Metropolitan Police Force (a bar to the Medal).
- James Price, Inspector, Metropolitan Police Force.
- Leslie Howard Terry, Special Constabulary Inspector, Metropolitan Police Force.
- Alfred Charles Salmon, Constable, Metropolitan Police Force.
- Herman Arthur Alexander Quashie, Police Constable, Trinidad Police Force.

For Distinguished Service

- John Clervaux Chaytor, DSO, MC, Chief Constable, North Riding of Yorkshire Constabulary.
- John Gabbitas, Superintendent and Deputy Chief Constable, Leicester City Police Force.
- Joseph William Parry Goulder, Chief Superintendent and Deputy Chief Constable, Gloucestershire Constabulary.
- Jesse Robert Lucas, Superintendent, City of London Police Force.
- Dorothy Olivia Georgiana Peto, OBE, Superintendent of Women Police, Metropolitan Police Force.
- Frank Swaby, Chief Constable, Leeds City Police Force.
- Eric Gladstone Webber, Superintendent, Somersetshire Constabulary and Regional Police Staff Officer, Bristol.
- James McConnach, Chief Constable, City of Aberdeen Police Force.
- William Merrilees, Superintendent, City of Edinburgh Police Force.
- Police: Northern Ireland.
- Michael Murphy, MM, District Inspector, Royal Ulster Constabulary.
- Herbert Blackledge, Fire Force Commander, No. 28 (Bolton) Fire Force.
- Frank Jowett, Divisional Officer, No. 6 (Hull) Fire Force.
- Henry James William King, Fire Force Commander, River Thames Formation.
- William Nicholson, Divisional Officer, No. 26 (Liverpool) Fire Force.
- Henry Ernest Skillern, Fire Staff Officer, Grade I, Headquarters, National Fire Service.
- Colin Sharp Davidson, OBE, Column Officer, Eastern Fire Area.
- Sydney William Walter Wright, Indian Police, District Superintendent of Police, Madras.
- Hugh Beresford Kidd, Indian Police, District Superintendent of Police, Bombay Suburban District, Bombay.
- Reginald Bonsfield Lagden, OBE, MC, Commandant, Special Constabulary, Calcutta, Bengal.
- Donald Ross Hardwick, Indian Police, Deputy Inspector-General of Police, Intelligence Branch, Criminal Investigation Department, Bengal.
- Khan Saadullah Khan, Officiating Deputy Superintendent of Police, Mardan, North-West Frontier Province.
- Colonel Walter Angus Muller, Commissioner of Police, Trinidad.
- Frederick William Syer, Assistant Inspector-General of Police, Palestine.
- Ahmed Sudqi Bey el Jundi, Qaid, Arab Legion.

=== Colonial Police Medal (CPM) ===
For Gallantry

- Constable Abdi Ahmed, Kenya Police Force
- Lance Corporal John Augustus Bailey, Trinidad Police Force.

For Meritorious Service

- Charles William Howe Thatcher, Superintendent, British South Africa Police.
- Robert Arthur Killick, Inspector, British South Africa Police.
- Jackson, Native Detective Sergeant, British South Africa Police.
- Shuria Adan, Corporal, Kenya Police Force.
- Abdul Salami Adeyinka Ebun Agbabiaka, Inspector, Grade I, Nigerian Police Force.
- Samson Amuzu Amable, Sub-Inspector, Gold Coast Police Force.
- Robert Christian Amanor, Constable, Gold Coast Police Force.
- Captain James Bruce Gordon Austin, Superintendent, Nigerian Police Force.
- Musa Awaleh, Inspector, British Somaliland Protectorate Police Force.
- Major Bertram Arthur Stanley Bennett, Superintendent, Gold Coast Police Force.
- Tewfik Kusta Bishara, Assistant Superintendent, Palestine Police Force.
- James Emanuel Brandon, Inspector, Sierra Leone Police Force.
- Captain Bernard Eglington Bulstrode, Superintendent, British Somaliland Protectorate Police Force.
- Leslie Chapman, Assistant Superintendent, Gold Coast Police Force.
- Robert Chattan Ross-Clunis, Superintendent, Cyprus Police Force.
- Albert Edward Conquest, Assistant Superintendent, Palestine Police Force.
- Arthur James Cook, Sergeant, Palestine Police Force.
- William Alfred Curtis, Inspector, Palestine Police Force.
- Frank de Abreu, Sergeant, British Guiana Police Force.
- Bartholomew Driscoll, Superintendent, Uganda Police Force.
- Derek Gwynne Cawley Eager, Sergeant, Palestine Police Force.
- Johnnie Silvanus Elba, Sergeant, Sierra Leone Police Force.
- Clavis Lavinio Ellcock, Sergeant, Barbados Police Force.
- Isaac Katrine Finkel, Corporal, Palestine Police Force.
- John Patrick Purcell Gildea, Superintendent, Gold Coast Police Force.
- Hersi Hassan, Sub-Inspector, British Somaliland Protectorate Police Force.
- Desmond Lynton Hill, Superintendent, Nigerian Police Force.
- Kipsang Kitam, Sergeant, Kenya Police Force.
- Alan Courtenay Luck, Superintendent, Nigerian Police Force.
- Frank Cyril Matthews, British Inspector, Palestine Police Force.
- John Anthony Moore, Inspector, Fiji Police Force.
- Abdi Nur, Corporal, Kenya Police Force.
- Charles William Pantry, Superintendent, Bermuda Police Force.
- Frank Cecil Rhodes Parris, Sergeant-Major, Barbados Police Force.
- Terence Patrick Phillips, MC, Superintendent, Nigerian Police Force.
- Bernard Alan Sheldon, Assistant Inspector, Kenya Police Force.
- Alan Edward Sigrist, Deputy Commissioner, Aden Police Force.
- William Rufus Skeete, Sergeant, Barbados Police Force.
- Desmond David Claude Swayne, Assistant Superintendent, Kenya Police Fierce.
- Allan Thomas Tate, Assistant Superintendent, Nyasaland Police Force.
- Peter Edward Turnbull, Assistant Superintendent, Sierra Leone Police Force.
- John Howard Walker, Chief Inspector, Kenya Police Force.
- Arthur Edward Wilson, Superintendent, Nyasaland Police Force.
- Ernest Frederick Eric Wolton, Superintendent, Tanganyika Territory Police Force.

== Canada ==
=== Order of the Bath ===
==== Companion of the Order of the Bath (CB) ====
Military Division

Royal Canadian Navy

- Rear-Admiral Leonard Warren Murray, CBE.

Canadian Army

- Major-General Ronald Okeden Alexander, DSO.
- Major-General John Percival MacKenzie, DSO, ED.

Royal Canadian Air Force

- Air Marshal William Avery Bishop, VC, DSO, MC, DFC.
- Air Vice-Marshal Ernest Walter Stedman, OBE.

=== Order of the British Empire ===
==== Commander of the Order of the British Empire (CBE) ====
Military Division

Royal Canadian Navy

- Captain (Commodore Second Class) Cuthbert Robert Holland Taylor.
- Paymaster Captain John Alick Edward Woodhouse, OBE, Royal Navy (Retd).

Canadian Army

- Major-General Rodney Frederick Leopold Keller.
- Brigadier Edmond Alfred Blais, MC.
- Brigadier Charles Stephen Booth, ED.
- Brigadier Charles Philip Fenwick, MC, ED.
- Brigadier Ralph Burgess Gibson, VD.
- Brigadier Noel Dudley Lambert.
- Brigadier Donald John MacDonald, DSO, MC.
- Brigadier Allister Thomas MacLean, MC, VD.
- Brigadier George Power Morrison.
- Brigadier Marcel Noel, ED.
- Brigadier Alexander Charles Spencer, ED.
- Colonel (Acting Brigadier) Hubert Brock Keenleyside.

Royal Canadian Air Force

- Air Vice-Marshal Arthur Thomas Noel Cowley.
- Air Vice-Marshal George Victor Walsh, MBE.
- Air Commodore Douglas Iron, OBE, Royal Air Force.
- Group Captain William Fielding Hanna.

==== Officer of the Order of the British Empire (OBE) ====
Military Division

Royal Canadian Navy

- Acting Captain Geoffrey Bateman Hope.
- Acting Captain (E) James William Keohane.
- Commander Frederick Avery Price, RCNVR.
- Acting Commander Laurence James Dover.
- Acting Temporary Commander (E) Charles Murtough O'Leary, RCNR.
- Acting Temporary Surgeon Commander Henry Robertson Ruttan, MD, RCNVR.
- Acting Temporary Lieutenant-Commander Anthony Fenwick Pickard, RCNR.
- Acting Lieutenant-Commander Angus Hetherington Rankin, RCNVR.
- Temporary Paymaster Lieutenant-Commander George Cringle, RCNVR.
- Lieutenant-Commander Isabel Janet MacNeill, Women's Royal Canadian Naval Service.

Canadian Army

- Colonel Albert Malcolm Brown, VD, General List.
- Colonel George Lynch Cameron, DSO, VD, Canadian Dental Corps.
- Colonel George William Cavey, MC, MM, Royal Canadian Ordnance Corps.
- Colonel Leonard McEwan Chesley, ED, General List.
- Colonel Charles Stuart Craig, DSO, MC, Royal Canadian Artillery.
- Colonel Osborn Shore Hollinrake, ED, Royal Canadian Artillery.
- Colonel George Wilfred Little, MVO, MC, ED, Canadian Armoured Corps.
- Colonel Edmund Batten McPherson, ED, Royal Canadian Artillery.
- Colonel Philippe Auguste Piuze, ED, The Canadian Provost Corps.
- Colonel Louis Scott, DCM, Canadian Infantry Corps.
- Colonel Archie Romuald St. Louis, Royal Canadian Corps of Signals.
- Lieutenant-Colonel (Acting Colonel) Hugh Alexander McKay, Corps of Royal Canadian Engineers.
- Lieutenant-Colonel (Acting Colonel) Donald Frederick Spankie, Canadian Infantry Corps.
- Lieutenant-Colonel (Acting Colonel) Ernest Brown Wilson, ED, Canadian Infantry Corps.
- Lieutenant-Colonel Ernest George Barrie, ED, Canadian Infantry Corps.
- Lieutenant-Colonel Francis Eric Bell, Royal Canadian Ordnance Corps.
- Lieutenant-Colonel Frederick Ashton Burgess, Royal Canadian Corps of Signals.
- Lieutenant-Colonel Robert James Cassidy, Corps of Royal Canadian Engineers.
- Lieutenant-Colonel Dameral Aubrey Clarke, MC, General List.
- Lieutenant-Colonel Paul Marechal Desautels, ED, Royal Canadian Army Service Corps.
- Lieutenant-Colonel Harold Arthur Pochet Francis, ED, Canadian Infantry Corps.
- Lieutenant-Colonel Joseph Marie Eugene Laval Fortier, Canadian Infantry Corps.
- Lieutenant-Colonel Archibald William Hunt, MM, Canadian Infantry Corps.
- Lieutenant-Colonel William Harold Kippen, DSO, MC, ED, Canadian Infantry Corps.
- Lieutenant-Colonel Frank Dwyer Lace, Royal Canadian Artillery.
- Lieutenant-Colonel Cyrille Joseph Laurin, General List.
- Lieutenant-Colonel James Walls Ross, ED, Royal Canadian Army Medical Corps.
- Lieutenant-Colonel John Godfrey Spragge, ED, Canadian Infantry Corps.

Royal Canadian Air Force

- Wing Commander Thomas Frederick Cooper (C.5202).
- Wing Commander Frank Homer Smith (C.1216).
- Wing Commander Albert Ross Tilley (C.3607).
- Wing Commander Henry Bartram Wood (C.1979).
- Acting Wing Commander Ernest Blake (35213), RAF.

Civil Division

- Captain Thomas Campbell Bannerman, Master, Canadian Merchant Navy.
- Robert Davidson Knox, Chief Engineer Officer, Canadian Merchant Navy.
- Captain Anaclet Leblanc, Master, Canadian Merchant Navy.
- Captain Edward Alfred LeBlanc, Master, Canadian Merchant Navy.
- Captain George Vincent Thomas, Master, Canadian Merchant Navy.
- Captain Herbert Lawson Thomas, Master, Canadian Merchant Navy.

==== Member of the Order of the British Empire (MBE) ====
Military Division

Royal Canadian Navy

- Acting Temporary Lieutenant (E) Gordon Allan, RCNR.
- Acting Temporary Skipper Lieutenant Herman Baker, RCNR.
- Temporary Chief Skipper Claude Kenneth Darrach, RCNR.
- Temporary Skipper William James Arsenault, RCNR.
- Mr. Charles McDonald, Commissioned Boatswain.
- Mr. Richard Leslie Richards, Commissioned Engineer, RCNR.
- Mr. Wilfred Roy Marryat, Commissioned Shipwright, RCNVR.
- Mr. Lawrence Chancy, Boatswain.
- Mr. Leonard Idiens, Coxswain, RCNR.
- Mr. Leslie Charles Karagianis, Warrant Steward.

Canadian Army

- Major (now Lieutenant-Colonel) William Gordon Dehney, Royal Canadian Ordnance Corps.
- Major (Acting Lieutenant-Colonel) Frank James Fleury, General List.
- Major (Acting Lieutenant-Colonel) Eric Leon Gibbs, General List.
- Major (Acting Lieutenant-Colonel) Cecil Alexander Hamilton, Canadian Infantry Corps.
- Major (Acting Lieutenant-Colonel) Harold McGill Jackson, ED, Canadian Infantry Corps.
- Major (Acting Lieutenant-Colonel) Daniel Charles O'Brien, Canadian Armoured Corps.
- Major (Acting Lieutenant-Colonel) Harold Bruce McAdam, Royal Canadian Ordnance Corps.
- Major (Acting Lieutenant-Colonel) Percy Alexander Woods, ED, Canadian Infantry Corps.
- Major Clarence Ayearst, Royal Canadian Army Pay Corps.
- Major James Duncan Kenneth Black, ED, Royal Canadian Artillery.
- Major Ralph Gilbert Bowser, Corps of Military Staff Clerks.
- Major John Archibald Douglas Craig, ED, Canadian Infantry Corps.
- Major Charles Harry Rutherford Dain, MC, Corps of Royal Canadian Engineers.
- Major George Matthewson Ewens, Royal Canadian Artillery.
- Major Donald George Percival Forbes, ED, Canadian Infantry Corps.
- Major Alexandre Gagnon, Royal Canadian Army Service Corps.
- Major John Thomas Harper, Canadian Infantry Corps.
- Major Howard Lawrence Hayman, Corps of Royal Canadian Engineers.
- Major Thomas Henry Jermyn, ED, Corps of Royal Canadian Engineers.
- Major Harold Johnston Keating, Royal Canadian Corps of Signals.
- Major Lucien-Alfred Lacroix, Royal Canadian Ordnance Corps.
- Major Phyllis Helena Lee Wright, Canadian Women's Army Corps.
- Major James George Keber Lindsay, Royal Canadian Army Medical Corps.
- Major Garnet Ernescliffe Macklin, MC, Canadian Infantry Corps.
- Major James Henderson Millar, The Canadian Provost Corps.
- Major George Frederick Millward, Corps of Royal Canadian Engineers.
- Major Stanley Henry Muton, Canadian Armoured Corps.
- Major Hedley Samuel Packman, ED, Canadian Armoured Corps.
- Major Edward Hammond Stevenson, The Canadian Provost Corps.
- Major Lovell John Stiver, Canadian Infantry Corps.
- Major Frederick Patrick Yokes, Corps of Royal Canadian Engineers.
- Captain (Acting Major) Albert Brindle, Royal Canadian Artillery.
- Captain (Acting Major) Sydney Buxton, Canadian Infantry Corps.
- Captain (Acting Major) Robert Edward Lucy, Royal Canadian Artillery.
- Captain (Acting Major) Craig Alexander McLaughlin, Royal Canadian Army Pay Corps.
- Captain (Acting Major) Harold Leonard Nixon, Royal Canadian Artillery.
- Captain (Acting Major) Francis Fesring Ouin, Royal Canadian Army Service Corps.
- Captain Joseph Emmanuel Archambault, Canadian Infantry Corps.
- Captain (Quartermaster) Frederick William Chapman, Royal Canadian Army Medical Corps.
- Captain Armand Cote, Royal Canadian Ordnance Corps.
- Captain (Quartermaster) Gordon Gerald MacKenzie, Canadian Armoured Corps.
- Captain David Ross McMaster, Royal Canadian Artillery.
- Captain John Hartley Neate, Royal Canadian Ordnance Corps.
- Captain Marshal De Witt Peters, General List.
- Captain George William Rogers, General List.
- Captain (Quartermaster) Thomas Sheehy, Canadian Armoured Corps.
- Captain John Slatter, Canadian Infantry Corps.
- Honorary Captain Harry Stonier-Hamnett, Canadian Chaplain Services.
- Captain Joseph Ephrem Teasdale, Corps of Royal Canadian Engineers.
- Captain Robert Alexander Wagner, Royal Canadian Corps of Signals.
- Lieutenant (Acting Captain) William Kirwan Willcocks Baldwin, Canadian Infantry Corps.
- Lieutenant (Acting Captain) Arthur James Elliott, Veterans Guard of Canada.
- Lieutenant (Acting Captain) Arthur Joseph Leblanc, Corps of Royal Canadian Engineers.
- Lieutenant (Acting Captain) Charles Donald MacKinnon, Royal Canadian Army Service Corps.
- Provisional Lieutenant Leo Bouchard, Corps of Military Staff Clerks.
- Lieutenant John Corner, Canadian Infantry Corps.
- Lieutenant Thomas William Sharp, Canadian Infantry Corps.
- Second Lieutenant Jean-Augustin Goulet, Canadian Infantry Corps.
- L.1848 Warrant Officer Class I (Sergeant-Major) John Melville Ballantine, Corps of Military Staff Clerks.
- D.118318 Warrant Officer Class I (Regimental Sergeant-Major) William Charles Cunningham, Royal Canadian Artillery.
- L.27401 Warrant Officer Class I (Regimental Sergeant-Major) Harry Den-ham, Canadian Infantry Corps.
- H.45607 Warrant Officer Class I (Regimental Sergeant-Major) Wilfred James Donaldson, Canadian Infantry Corps.
- P.10567 Warrant Officer Class I (Sergeant-Major) James Somerville Dunlop, Corps of Royal Canadian Engineers.
- K.74429 Warrant Officer Class I (Garrison Sergeant-Major) John MacMorland Green, Royal Canadian Artillery.
- H.39235 Warrant Officer Class I (Regimental Sergeant-Major) Alec Lockwood, Corps of Royal Canadian Engineers.
- B.21001 Warrant Officer Class I (Regimental Sergeant-Major) John James Victor McDonald, Royal Canadian Artillery.
- E.0168 Warrant Officer Class I (Regimental Sergeant-Major) Wilbert Findley McRae, Canadian Infantry Corps.
- P.866 Warrant Officer Class I (Regimental Sergeant-Major) James Michael Ross, Canadian Armoured Corps.
- M.8 Warrant Officer Class I (Regimental Sergeant-Major) William Charles Shirley, Royal Canadian Artillery.
- M.42002 Warrant Officer Class I (Sergeant-Major) William James Wilson Cathro, Royal Canadian Army Service Corps.
- P.35225 Warrant Officer Class II (Armament Quartermaster-Sergeant) Alexander Joseph Christensen, Royal Canadian Ordnance Corps.
- D.114531 Warrant Officer Class II (Company Sergeant-Major) Theodore Jean Armand Dubois, Canadian Intelligence Corps.
- A.56762 Warrant Officer Class II (Company Sergeant-Major) Stanley George Dunscombe, Canadian Infantry Corps.
- F.14160 Warrant Officer Class II (Quartermaster-Sergeant) Preston George Hillier, Royal Canadian Artillery.
- F.20420 Warrant Officer Class II (Battery Sergeant-Major) Harold Kieghley Raper, Royal Canadian Artillery.
- B.101634 Warrant Officer Class II (Company Sergeant-Major) Henry Thomas Shepherd, Royal Canadian Army Service Corps.
- B.74842 Warrant Officer Class II (Company Sergeant-Major) Thomas Joseph Smith, Canadian Infantry Corps.
- M.41144 Warrant Officer Class II (Company Sergeant-Major) Ernest Albert Stanford, Corps of Military Staff Clerks.
- D.59090 Warrant Officer Class II (Company Sergeant-Major) Joseph Armand Robert St. Laurent, Canadian Infantry Corps.
- A.56894 Warrant Officer Class II (Company Sergeant-Major) Arthur Charles Webb, MC, Canadian Infantry Corps.
- P.9822 Warrant Officer Class II (Battery Sergeant-Major) Russell Seth Young, Royal Canadian Artillery.

Royal Canadian Air Force

- Wing Commander Spence Anderson Allan (C.2338).
- Wing Commander Joseph Medard Ladislas Emard (C.4032).
- Wing Commander Ian Nicholson McKinnon (C.1910).
- Wing Commander Harold Pearce (C.1101).
- Wing Commander Harry Leslie Wright (C.2758).
- Squadron Leader Edward Alfred Blanchard (C.2074).
- Squadron Leader David Moses Bruser (C.5879).
- Squadron Leader Sherman Reed Burbank (C.1990).
- Squadron Leader Kenneth Cairns Cameron (C.2912).
- Squadron Leader David Frederick Manders (C.995).
- Squadron Leader Horatio Cecil Shaw (C.4384).
- Squadron Leader Kenneth Walter Walton (C.2104).
- Squadron Leader Alden Prescott Whalen (C.2701).
- Flight Lieutenant Reginald James Axcell (C.12936).
- Flight Lieutenant William Henry Corkill (80901), RAFVR.
- Flight Lieutenant George William Delaney (74473), RAFVR.
- Flight Officer Margot Constance Northwood (V.30317), RCAF (Women's Division).
- Flight Lieutenant John Robert Valentine Tremaine (C.3368).
- Warrant Officer, Class I, James Herbert Cooper (6519).
- Warrant Officer James Walter McDowell Day (365842), RAF.
- Warrant Officer Finlay Fraser (358709), RAF.
- Warrant Officer Harold Eric Peel Gray (363407), RAF.
- Warrant Officer, Class I, John Albert Silver (R.68735).
- Warrant Officer, Class I, Morley Squire (430).
- Warrant Officer, Class II, Leslie James Stratton (1958).

Civil Division

- Alexander Hendry, Chief Officer, Canadian Merchant Navy.
- Captain Alphonse Ernest Lavallee, Master, Canadian Lightship.
- Michael Joseph Moyle, Second Engineer Officer now Chief Engineer Officer, Canadian Merchant Navy.
- Walter Oliver, Chief Officer, Canadian Merchant Navy.
- Supervisor Wensley Ritchie MacCoy, Auxiliary Services.
- Supervisor Andrew Dick MacCrindle, Auxiliary Services.
- Supervisor Gordon Pilfrey, Auxiliary Services.
- Supervisor Thomas Bernard Ryan, Auxiliary Services.

=== George Medal (GM) ===
- Commander Owen Connor Robertson, Royal Canadian Naval Reserve.

=== British Empire Medal (BEM) ===
Military Division

Royal Canadian Navy

- Chief Petty Officer Frank Edward Aves, 2617.
- Chief Petty Officer William Burtee Dodsworth, 21455.
- Chief Petty Officer William Clifton Pickering, RCNR, A-2654
- Acting Chief Petty Officer Henry Biddle, RCNVR, V-10186.
- Chief Engine Room Artificer John David Pratt, X-21317.
- Chief Petty Officer Writer Bruce S. Joudrey, RCNVR, V-25078.
- Engine Room Artificer Second Class Peter Christie Allan, RCNVR, V-10347.
- Regulating Petty Officer Robert Blakeley, RCNVR, V-22076.
- Leading Seaman Allan Boon, RCNVR, V-16252.
- Able Seaman Albert Bruce Campbell, RCNR, FR.244.
- Stoker First Class William Samuel Carson, RCNVR, V-68135.
- Cook (S) Allen John Roberts, RCNVR, V-36211.
- Ordinary Seaman Diver Second Class Albert Joseph Hanley, RCNVR, V-2493.

Canadian Army

- B.5804 Mechanist Staff Sergeant Clifford George Denny, Corps of Royal Canadian Engineers.
- A.34214 Staff Sergeant Edward Thomas Newman, MM, Veterans Guard of Canada.
- M.41143 Staff Sergeant William Kenneth Robson, Corps of Military Staff Clerks.
- P.35168 Staff Sergeant Frederick George Arnott Salmon, Royal Canadian Ordnance Corps.
- D.92720 Sergeant (Acting Warrant Officer Class II, Quartermaster-Sergeant) Alexander Hailey Campbell, Corps of Military Staff Clerks.
- E.5930 Sergeant (now Acting Warrant Officer Class II, Company Sergeant-Major) Emile Couture, Corps of Military Staff Clerks.
- B.54878 Sergeant (Acting Warrant Officer Class II, Staff Quartermaster-Sergeant) Harold George Ernest Langstaff, Royal Canadian Ordnance Corps.
- E.25535 Sergeant (Acting Warrant Officer Class II, Quartermaster-Sergeant) James Hector MacKay, Royal Canadian Artillery.
- K.22167 Sergeant (Acting Staff Sergeant) Joseph Hochbaum, Royal Canadian Artillery.
- A.37796 Sergeant Jack Fortune Bartlett, Canadian Infantry Corps.
- B.23011 Sergeant Herbert Joseph Bellisle, Corps of Royal Canadian Engineers.
- D.32003 Sergeant Arthur Herbert Henry Bieber, Royal Canadian Corps of Signals.
- K.92511 Sergeant Sydney Ebbutt Church, Veterans Guard of Canada.
- C.96298 Sergeant Thomas Fox, Corps of Military Staff Clerks.
- K.98555 Sergeant Edward John Levesque, Canadian Forestry Corps.
- W.2048 Sergeant Mable Mary Patterson, Canadian Women's Army Corps.
- A.10000 Lance Sergeant (Acting Sergeant) Gerald Woodside, Royal Canadian Army Service Corps.
- B.40382 Corporal (Lance Sergeant) Arthur Sydney Lang, Corps of Royal Canadian Engineers.
- B.36001 Corporal Bartholomew Andrews, Veterans Guard of Canada.
- E.610296 Corporal Jacques Aubry, Canadian Infantry Corps.
- D.107314 Corporal James Leslie Brown, MM, Veterans Guard of Canada.
- H.601959 Corporal Alex Cherniski, Canadian Infantry Corps.
- F.25542 Bombardier William Joseph Comeau, Royal Canadian Artillery.
- P.35362 Corporal Frank Clifton Lord, Veterans Guard of Canada.
- D.121480 Corporal Joseph Henry Madden, Royal Canadian Army Service Corps.
- A.54789 Corporal Thomas Edward Morrison, Veterans Guard of Canada.
- K.68659 Bombardier Edward Arthur Stebner, Royal Canadian Artillery.
- H.59148 Lance-Corporal James Keith Robinson, The Canadian Provost Corps.
- K.57214 Private (Acting Sergeant) Douglas Bute Stewart, Canadian Infantry Corps.
- B.26810 Private (Acting Corporal) John Ernest Aubin, Royal Canadian. Army Service Corps.
- W.10061 Private (Acting Corporal) Ann Crapleve, Canadian Women's Army Corps.
- E.91802 Sapper (Acting Corporal) Thomas James Murphy, Corps of Royal Canadian Engineers.
- B.58786 Private (Acting Lance-Corporal) Huntly Gerrard MacDonald, Royal Canadian Ordnance Corps.
- K.42569 Private Kenneth Arthur Ingham, Canadian Infantry Corps.
- H.17366 Sapper Ronald George James, Corps of Royal Canadian Engineers.
- D.135121 Gunner Napoleon Miclette, Royal Canadian Artillery.

Royal Canadian Air Force

- R.96558 Flight Sergeant John Gordon Armstrong.
- R.128085 Flight Sergeant Walter Berry.
- 993645 Flight Sergeant Robert Forster Blair, RAF.
- 560551 Flight Sergeant Frederick Albert Spicer Carter, RAF.
- 2238 Flight Sergeant Lawrence Foan.
- R.54736 Flight Sergeant Anatoly Givotnikoff.
- R.51430 Flight Sergeant Peter Gros.
- R.50938 Flight Sergeant Simon MacDonald.
- R.58132 Flight Sergeant John Olson Major.
- R.51375 Flight Sergeant Harry Lorraine Ogletree.
- FAA/FX76286 Chief Petty Officer Airman Richard Stephen Rolph, Royal Navy.
- 591177 Flight Sergeant James Scrimgeour, RAF.
- R.86999 Flight Sergeant David Moses Wolochow.
- R.59387 Sergeant Harry Joseph Conn.
- R.54948 Sergeant Victor Percival Davidson.
- 591554 Sergeant Douglas George Evans, RAF.
- R.87068 Sergeant William Flett Forman.
- R.103848 Sergeant Harry William Harrison.
- 63964 Sergeant Frederick Denham Lonsdale, RAF.
- R.54355 Sergeant Adam Bruce MacQueen.
- R.89934 Sergeant Percy Moote.
- W.307763 Sergeant Mauriette Elvira Oliver, RCAF (Women's Division).
- R.74623 Sergeant Elmer Lee Scott.
- 302396 Sergeant Thomas Edward Smith, RAF.
- W.304473 Sergeant Bessie Carolina May Wiebe, RCAF (Women's Division).
- R.54776 Corporal Anthony Lee.
- R.86932 Corporal Edward Stevens.
- R.97816 Corporal Guy Lyndon Twiss.
- W.306630 Airwoman, Class I, Audrey Mary Anderson, RCAF (Women's Division).

Civil Division

- Thomas Mathew DeWolfe, Seaman, Canadian Merchant Navy.
- Harold Gates, Boatswain, Canadian Merchant Navy.
- John J. Murray, Carpenter, Canadian Merchant Navy.
- L. Pierce, Carpenter, Canadian Merchant Navy.
- Alexander Cassels Watson, Boatswain, Canadian Merchant Navy.

=== Royal Red Cross (RRC) ===
Royal Canadian Army Medical Corps

- Major (Principal Matron) Annie Black Boyd, ARRC.
- Major (Principal Matron) Frances Grace Charlton.
- Major (Principal Matron) Edith Rainsford Dick.
- Major (Principal Matron) Suzanne Giroux.
- Captain (Matron) Sarah Jane Roberts.

==== Associate of the Royal Red Cross (ARRC) ====
Royal Canadian Army Medical Corps

- Lieutenant (Nursing Sister) Helen Mary Cannon.
- Lieutenant (Nursing Sister) Kathleen Georgina Christie.
- Lieutenant (Physiotherapy Aide) Constance Neville Compston.
- Lieutenant (Nursing Sister) Dorothy Winnifred Rapsey.
- Lieutenant (Nursing Sister) Marie Therese Georgette St. Georges.
- Lieutenant (Nursing Sister) Frances Sybil Tetlaw.
- Lieutenant (Nursing Sister) Anna May Waters.
- Lieutenant (Physiotherapy Aide) Effie Beryl Webster.
- Lieutenant (Nursing Sister) Helen Elizabeth Wilson.
- Lieutenant (Nursing Sister) Leila Marie Young.

Royal Canadian Air Force

- Matron Jessie Elizabeth Christina Porteous, (C.5657).
- Nursing Sister Mary Jean Cleary, (C.4487).

=== Distinguished Flying Cross (DFC) ===
Royal Canadian Air Force

- Flight Lieutenant Robert Morrison Aldwinckle (J.5766), No. 10 (RCAF) Squadron.
- Flight Lieutenant John Peter Blythman Dale (J.10795), No. 10 (RCAF) Squadron.
- Flight Lieutenant Leonard Alvin Draper (J.5704), No. 113 (RCAF) Squadron.
- Flight Lieutenant Bruce Alexander Murray (J.7212), No. 10 (RCAF) Squadron.
- Flying Officer Gustave Edwin Francis (J.10690), No. 113 (RCAF) Squadron.
- Flying Officer Thomas Fraser (J.22321), No. 113 (RCAF) Squadron.
- Flying Officer Peter Gower Hughes (J.10708), No. 10 (RCAF) Squadron.
- Flying Officer Albert Stanford White (J.23795), No. 113 (RCAF) Squadron.
- Pilot Officer Roger Wilson Beamish (J.36688), No. 10 (RCAF) Squadron.
- Pilot Officer Allan MacDougall Roy (J.29626), No. 119 (RCAF) Squadron.
- Warrant Officer, Class I, John Billings (R.92420), No. 10 (RCAF) Squadron.
- Warrant Officer, Class I, William Christie Maxwell (R.93153), No. 10 (RCAF) Squadron.

=== Air Force Cross (AFC) ===
Royal Canadian Air Force

- Group Captain John Gay Stephenson.
- Group Captain Alfred Watts.
- Wing Commander Wilfrid John Bundy (C.264).
- Wing Commander Herman Hamilton Langford (C.485).
- Wing Commander Joseph Carmel Mirabelli (C.1575).
- Wing Commander Edwin Michael Reyno (C.806).
- Wing Commander William Ronald David Turner (C.1369).
- Acting Wing Commander Frank Bernard Howard Hayward (28188), RAF.
- Squadron Leader Herbert Charles Jewsbury (C.5582).
- Squadron Leader Andre Rene Morrissette (J.4102).
- Flight Lieutenant John Allan Boyle (J.6226).
- Flight Lieutenant George Davison (44782), RAF.
- Flight Lieutenant William Howard Durnin (J.15155).
- Flight Lieutenant Hugh Frost Featherby (101469), RAFVR.
- Flight Lieutenant Frederick Duncan McKechnie (J.4103).
- Flying Officer Raymond James Eugene Barichelle (J.20053).
- Flying Officer Francis Victor Pilon (J.21667).
- Pilot Officer Charles Grant Reynolds Dyer (C.36584).
- Warrant Officer, Class I, Wesley Dynes Bailey (R.71959).
- Warrant Officer John Arthur Harrison (1069913), RAFVR.

=== Air Force Medal (AFM) ===
- 1215713 Leading Aircraftman James Daniel Collins, RAFVR.

=== Mentioned in Despatches ===
Royal Canadian Navy

- Acting Temporary Lieutenant-Commander Philip Cabell Evans, RCNR.
- Acting Temporary Lieutenant-Commander William Roland Stacey, RCNR.
- Acting Temporary Lieutenant-Commander Ian Hunter Bell, RCNVR.
- Acting Temporary Lieutenant-Commander Frederick Bancroft Brooks-Hill, RCNVR.
- Acting Temporary Lieutenant-Commander James Sinclair Davis, RCNVR.
- Acting Temporary Lieutenant-Commander Henry Knox Hill, RCNVR.
- Acting Temporary Lieutenant-Commander Rendell James Godschall Johnson, RCNVR.
- Acting Temporary Lieutenant-Commander Dudley Gawen King, RCNVR.
- Acting Temporary Lieutenant-Commander Frederick Robb Knyvet Naftel, RCNVR.
- Temporary Lieutenant John Alexander Ferguson, RCNR.
- Temporary Lieutenant John Glover McQuarrie, RCNR.
- Temporary Lieutenant Fred Francis Osborne, RCNR.
- Temporary Lieutenant Freeman Elkins Burrows, RCNVR.
- Temporary Lieutenant Sidney William Buxton, RCNVR.
- Temporary Lieutenant Gordon Duncan Campbell, RCNVR.
- Temporary Lieutenant Geoffrey Lionel Goodwin, RCNVR.
- Temporary Lieutenant Richard Wallace Hart, RCNVR.
- Temporary Lieutenant Archibald Miller Kirkpatrick, RCNVR.
- Temporary Lieutenant John Barry O'Brien, RCNVR.
- Temporary Lieutenant James Leslie Percy, RCNVR.
- Temporary Lieutenant James Charles Pratt, RCNVR.
- Temporary Lieutenant Charles Wallace Spinney, RCNVR.
- Temporary Lieutenant (E) William Simpson Gibson, RCNVR.
- Mr. Sandon Alexander Karr, Acting Warrant Engineer, RCNR.
- Chief Petty Officer Douglas Robert Strachan, RCNR, A-4161.
- Acting Chief Engine Room Artificer Herbert Cecil Harris, RCNVR, V-25877.
- Petty Officer Robert Marshall, Royal Canadian Navy, 4775.
- Stoker Petty Officer Gerald Ludvig Haugen, RCNR, A-764.
- Stoker Petty Officer Walter Valentine Sweet, RCNVR, V-10003.
- Acting Petty Officer John George Alerie, RCNVR, V-5626.
- Acting Engine Room Artificer Fourth Class Albert Gordon Dryden, RCNVR, V-24854.
- Acting Engine Room Artificer Fourth Class Joseph Keith Fleming, RCNVR, V-55387.
- Leading Seaman Carmen Ernest Stephenson, Ottawa, RCNVR, V-5646.
- Leading Telegraphist Thomas Shute, RCNVR, V-17066.
- Acting Leading Seaman Henry Snow, RCNR, A-2212.
- Acting Leading Seaman Morrill Henry Rodgerson, RCNR, A-4854.
- Acting Leading Seaman Bruce Simon Scott, RCNVR, V-2435.
- Acting Leading Seaman Lloyd Victor North, RCNVR, V-10323.
- Able Seaman Allan Porter, RCNR, A-1533.
- Able Seaman Reginald Taylor, RCNVR, V-16072.
- Stoker First Class Oliver Philip Munt, RCNVR, V-46590.
- Stoker First Class Virgil Green, RCNVR, V-54609.

Royal Canadian Air Force

Wing Commanders

- R. R. Ings (C.27599). (deceased).
- R. W. Devins (C.2513).
- D. E. Galloway (C.378).

Squadron Leader

- J. F. Green (C.1970).

Flight Lieutenants

- S. G. Bruce (J.10705).
- R. F. Fisher (J.5821).
- J. Hearst (J.8606).
- W. J. I. Montgomery (J.9186).
- R. K. Roulston (J.10395).

Flying Officers

- E. J. Brady (J.13994).
- D. C. Hicks (J.11005).
- J. C. Jensen (C.10902).
- J. S. Johnston (C.7987).

Flight Officer

- M. M. Graham (V.30042). (Women's Division).

Assistant Section Officer

- N. H. Willett (V.30551). (Women's Division).

Warrant Officer, Class I

- W. S. McKay (1941).

Warrant Officers, Class II

- B. J. Bielinski (R.102428).
- A. J. Escaravage (R.95078).
- J. G. Griggs (R.122317).
- A. C. Johns (R.69281).
- J. Lament (R.97502).
- C. D. Loader (R.121205).
- J. Silverstein (R.67673).

Flight Sergeants

- R.680 G. W. Downes.
- 2264 H. Jones.
- R.50272 P. K. Jones.
- 2157A H. Smith.
- 770003 E. A. Spire, RAFVR.

Sergeant

- 7803 C. T. Ryan.

Corporal

- R.131352 I. N. P. Jackson.

=== King's Commendation for Valuable Service in the Air ===
- Squadron Leader W. R. Brown (J.3996), RCAF.
- Squadron Leader P. M. Hale (C.3880), RCAF.
- Squadron Leader A. J. A. Laing (39993), RAFO.
- Flight Lieutenant L. I. Armstrong (J.6646), RCAF.
- Flight Lieutenant J. R. Eldridge (86967), RAFVR.
- 658664 Flight Sergeant E. D. Skelding, RAF.

== South Africa ==
=== Order of the Bath ===
==== Companion of the Order of the Bath (CB) ====
Military Division

- Temporary Brigadier (Acting Major General) Francis Richard Gurney Hoare, South African Staff Corps (Volunteers).

=== Order of the British Empire ===
==== Commander of the Order of the British Empire (CBE) ====
Military Division

- Temporary Brigadier Edwin Williamson, South African Staff Corps (Volunteers).
- Temporary Brigadier John Daniel, South African Staff Corps (Volunteers).
- War Substantive Colonel George Clement Gie Werdmuller, South African Staff Corps (Volunteers).

==== Officer of the Order of the British Empire (OBE) ====
Military Division

- Temporary Commander Brian Laidlaw Goodlet, South African Naval Forces.
- War Substantive Lieutenant-Colonel David Ashwood Lane, General Services Corps (Volunteers).
- Temporary Lieutenant-Colonel George Albert Leech, MM, South African Army Postal Corps.
- Colonel Benjamin Gottlieb Viljoen, South African Air Force.

==== Member of the Order of the British Empire (MBE) ====
Military Division

South African Naval Forces

- Lieutenant John William Lundberg (67099V).

South African Army

- War Substantive Lieutenant-Colonel James Woodhouse Wright (86178V), South African Artillery.
- Lieutenant-Colonel Albert Bond (40012V), Technical Services Corps.
- War Substantive Major (Acting Lieutenant-Colonel) James Cameron McIntyre (123638V), South African Engineer Corps.
- War Substantive Major Douglas Barend Van Riet (74578V), General Services Corps (Volunteers), attached N.M.C.
- Temporary Major Jack Penn (295956V), South African Medical Corps.
- Temporary Captain Emile Albert Ehlinger (143003V), South African Intelligence Corps.
- War Substantive Captain William Norman Roberts (19906V), South African Engineer Corps.
- Warrant Officer I Arthur Enoch Bagshaw Lamb (240503V), General Services Corps (Volunteers), attached Base Depot.

South African Air Force

- Lieutenant-Colonel Horace Woodward (P102866V).
- Major Hyman Starfield (103020V).
- Major Frederick Charles John Fry (2028857).
- Major Simon Biesheuvel (2033337).
- Temporary Captain Ernest Edward Schmidt (293697).
- Temporary Lieutenant Olive Raeburn Scholtz (F46951V), Women's Auxiliary Air Force.

=== British Empire Medal (BEM) ===
Military Division

South African Naval Forces

- Chief Engine Room Artificer Gustav Adolph Nelson (66832V).
- Ordnance Artificer Ronald James Fiske (47989), (seconded from the Royal Navy).

South African Army

- Sergeant John Douglas Armstrong (235829V), South African Corps of Signals.
- Farrier Sergeant Francois Johannes Bestbier (P4497V), "Q" Services Corps (Veterinary and Remount Services).
- War Substantive Sergeant William Brough (P4181V), South African Artillery.
- Corporal Lewis Charles Brown (289785V), South African Corps of Signals.
- Corporal Richard Roelof Troeberg (72456V), "Q" Services Corps (Transport Directorate).
- Signaller Patrick Harry Casey (155858V), South African Corps of Signals.
- Sapper Gerrit Albertus van Niekerk Fabricius (134535V), South African Engineer Corps.

South African Air Force

- Flight Sergeant Allan Bryant Crawford (314183V).
- Temporary Flight Sergeant Peter Johannes Reitsma (94272V).
- Flight Sergeant Theunis Gerdhardus Van Onselen (P724V).
- Air Sergeant Phillip John Groenewald (112079V).
- Temporary Sergeant Philip Albert Valentine Henneberger (P598V).
- Air Mechanic Arthur Raymond Marchand (338206V).

=== Royal Red Cross (RRC) ===
South African Military Nursing Service

- Principal Matron Maria Elizabeth Wilhelmina Olivier (254800V).
- Senior Matron Gladys Josephine Sharpe (317112) (Canadian).
- Junior Matron Eleanor Jeppe (316811V).

=== Air Force Cross (AFC) ===
South African Air Force

- Temporary Lieutenant-Colonel Eric Aubrey Pope (P102597V).
- Temporary Major Pieter Jooste Hayden-Thomas (P102652V).
- Temporary Major Roy Crawford Davidson (203106V).
- Captain George Charles Henry Freeman (47312V).
- Temporary Captain William Marshall Smith (47862V).
- Temporary Captain Harold Percy Blinkhorn (2030967).
- Lieutenant Daniel Petras Du Toit (35535V).
- Temporary Lieutenant Cyril Frank Rene Le Sueur (205407V).
- Lieutenant Henry John Rainier Tindall (152744V).
- Warrant Officer Class II James Richard Lund (96614V).

==== Bar to the Air Force Cross ====
- Temporary Major Matthys Johannes Uys, AFC, (102734V).
