= Tondaiman =

Indian family

The Tondaiman family were Tamil rulers of the ancient Tondai Nadu (Tondaimandalam) division of Tamilakkam in South India. Their capital was at Kanchipuram.

They ruled with the Pallava dynasty, which controlled northern Tamil Nadu and Andhra Pradesh and had its capital at Kanchipuram. Hundreds of records and edicts exist pertaining to the Tondaiman rulers of Chola dynasty.

== Sangam literature ==
Ruler Tondaiman Ilandiraiyan was mentioned in Purananuru (புறநானூறு) (in one of the poems written by Avvaiyar) as a king confronting Adhiaman; battle was avoided by the tactics of Avvaiyaar. He is said to be the founder of Pallava dynasty. Pathupaattu (பத்துப்பாட்டு) a sangam literature work mentioned that Tondaiman Ilandriyan ruled Kanchipuram town before 2500 years.

== Chola Empire ==
The Tondaiman title was borne by various chiefs in the Chola empire, notable ones being Karunakara Tondaiman and Naralokaviran alias Porkoyil Tondaiman who served as generals under Kulottunga I.

The poet Kambar wrote Silaiyezhupathu about Karunagara Tondaiman.

== Origin ==
=== Aranthangi Tondaimans ===
The Aranthangi Tondaimans ruled Aranthangi from the 15th to the 18th centuries in southern Tamil Nadu. The Aranthangi Tondaimans belonged to the Kallar community. There are references to the Aranthangi Tondaimans in temple inscriptions at Avudayarkovil, Alapiranthan, Palaiyavanam, Pillaivayal, Aranthangi, Kovilur, Paramandur, Palankarai, Piranmalai, Thiruvarankulam and Kurumbur. Similarly, the Aranthangi Tondaimans were an independent line of chieftains ruling from Aranthangi. They flourished about 200 years before the rule of the Thondaman dynasty of Pudukottai (which began around 1640).

The Aranthangi Tondaimans were the chief patrons of the Avudayarkovil temple, and regularly donated to its maintenance (as indicated by copper plates in the possession of the Tiruvavaduthurai Adheenam). They donated land to the Tiruvarur, Rameswaram, Kanchipuram and Benares temples. About 25 copper plates indicating grants from the Aranthangi Tondaimans have been recorded so far; 16 are in the Thiruvavaduthurai Adheenam.Their direct descendants were the Palayavanam Zamin "Vanangamudi Pandarathar". The Thondaiman kings of the Pudukkottai principality who came to power in the 17th century were their descendants.

=== Pudukottai Tondaimans ===
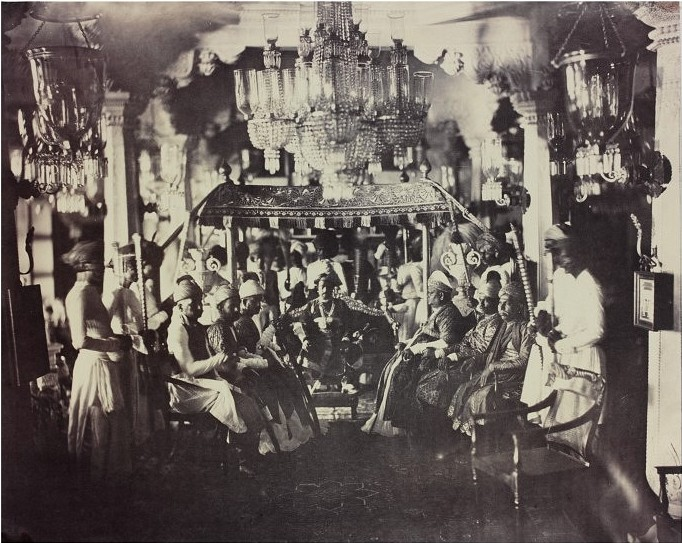
Thondaiman King in his Durbar, Pudukkottai, 1858.

The Thondaimans are chieftains who ruled the region in and around Pudukottai from the 17th to 20th century. The Aranthangi Tondaimans belonged to the Kallar community. The Pudukkottai Thondaiman dynasty was founded by Raghunatha Thondaiman, the brother-in-law of the then Raja of Ramnad, RaghunathaKilavan Setupati. The Pudukottai Samasthanam was under Thondaiman dynasty for one year even after Indian Independence. The Thondaiman dynasty had a special Valari regiment.

== List of Pudukottai Thondaman Kings ==
The Thondaman lineage:

- Raghunatha Raya Tondaiman (1686–1730)
- Vijaya Raghunatha Raya Tondaiman I (1730–1769)
- Raya Raghunatha Tondaiman (1769 – Dec 1789)
- Vijaya Raghunatha Tondaiman (Dec 1789 – 1 February 1807)
- Vijaya Raghunatha Raya Tondaiman II (1 February 1807 – June 1825)
- Raghunatha Tondaiman (June 1825 – 13 July 1839)
- Ramachandra Tondaiman (13 July 1839 – 15 April 1886)
- Marthanda Bhairava Tondaiman (15 April 1886 – 28 May 1928)
- Rajagopala Tondaiman (28 October 1928 – 4 March 1948 {as Official} 5 March 1948-16 Jan 1997 {as Titular} )
- R. Rajagopala Tondaiman (16 Jan 1997 – present) (Titular)
