= Thondaman dynasty =

Traditional dynasty in India

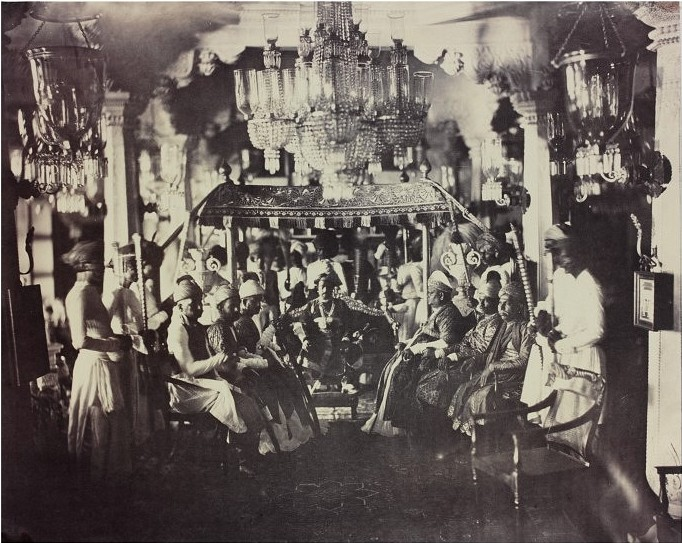
Thondaiman King in his Durbar, Pudukkottai, 1858.

The Thondaman or Thondaiman was a dynasty ruled the region in and around Pudukkottai from the 17th to 20th century. The Pudukkottai Thondaiman dynasty was founded by Raghunatha Thondaiman, the brother-in-law of the then Raja of Ramnad, RaghunathaKilavan Setupati. The Pudukottai Samasthanam was under Thondaiman dynasty for one year even after Indian Independence. The Thondaiman dynasty had a special Valari regiment.

== History ==
In 1686, the Ramnad kingdom was ruled by Raghunatha Kilavan Setupati, the Raja of Ramnad and the Pudukottai region was ruled by a chief called Pallavarayan. The Raja of Ramnad suspected the chief's loyalty to the Ramnad kingdom and believed that the chief would shift his allegiance to the ruler of Thanjavur. So the Raja of Ramnad ousted the chief and appointed his brother-in-law Ragunatha Raya Tondaman, the brother of his queen Kathayi Nachiar, as the new ruler of Pudukottai. Thondaiman, the son of Avadai Raghunatha Tondaiman, was earlier ruling Thirumayam. In appreciation of Tondaman's services, Raghunatha Kilavan Setupati gave him the region of Pudukkottai.

Thondaman became the de facto ruler of Pudukottai. In later centuries, the Thondaiman rulers, while nominally feudatories of the Ramnad state, often pursued an independent foreign policy, a trend common in all parts of India at that time.

After becoming the ruler of Pudukottai, Raghunatha Thondaiman fought against the Nayaks of Tanjore in support of the Nayaks of Madurai and conquered Thirukkattupalli, a very important place. Then, there was a direct clash between Thondaimans of Pudukottai and the Nayaks rulers of Tanjore. Thondaiman conquered the west of Thirukkattupalli.

The next ruler Raja Vijaya Reghunatha Raya Thondaiman helped Nawab of Arcot against Hyder Ali, the ruler of Mysore. He was also loyal towards the British Government. After some time, when Hyder Ali's army tried to invade the kingdom of Pudukkottai, Thondaiman's army defeated them and drove Hyder's army away. Thondaiman captured Kilanilai and Aranthangi. He helped the British Government against Tipu Sultan.

Pudukkotai finally came under formal British protection. This was arguably unavoidable, since the Thondaimans were much menaced in that period by a resurgent Mysore ruled by Hyder Ali and Tipu Sultan. Tipu Sultan had sought to leverage the power of the French against the British

== Thondaman Rulers ==
The Thondaman lineage:

- Raghunatha Raya Tondaiman (1686–1730)
- Vijaya Raghunatha Raya Tondaiman I (1730–1769)
- Raya Raghunatha Tondaiman (1769 – Dec 1789)
- Vijaya Raghunatha Tondaiman (Dec 1789 – 1 February 1807)
- Vijaya Raghunatha Raya Tondaiman II (1 February 1807 – June 1825)
- Raghunatha Tondaiman (June 1825 – 13 July 1839)
- Ramachandra Tondaiman (13 July 1839 – 15 April 1886)
- Marthanda Bhairava Tondaiman (15 April 1886 – 28 May 1928)
- Rajagopala Tondaiman (28 October 1928 – 4 March 1948 {as Official} 5 March 1948 – 16 Jan 1997 {as Titular} )
- R. Rajagopala Tondaiman II (16 Jan 1997 – present) (Titular)

== See also ==
- Pudukkottai state
- Tondaiman
