= Pudukkottai Legislative Council =

Pudukkottai Legislative Council was the legislative assembly which functioned in the princely state of Pudukkottai from 1924 to 1948. Made up of 50 members, 15 of whom were nominated, the assembly discussed issues of importance to the state and passed resolutions on them. The legislative council was eventually disbanded in 1948 when the state was annexed to the Dominion of India and became a part of Tiruchirappalli district.

== Origin and history ==
Until 1850, legislations made in Pudukkottai state were limited to royal proclamations and British Indian laws were not in use. From 1850 onwards, British Indian laws were introduced in stages, with the Civil Procedure Code in 1859 and Indian Penal Code in 1868. Registration laws were enacted in 1876 and a police force was created the same year.

Until 1904, bills were drafted by the diwan and circulated to the assistant diwan, civil judge, appeal judge and heads of departments for their opinion. Bills became law once the Raja gave his assent. In 1904, the function of drafting bills was delegated to a Law Committee. On the occasion of his Silver Jubilee in 1915, Martanda Bhairava Tondaiman inaugurated an advisory council composed of the State vakil, two members of the Representative Assembly and two members nominated by the raja. The council was purely advisory in nature and did not have any say in other matters.

The Pudukkottai Legislative Council owes its genesis to the state's first representative body - the Assembly of Nominated Representatives, which was inaugurated in 1902 by Diwan bahadur Siram Venkataramadas Nayudu. Made up of 30 members nominated by various departments of the state administration, the assembly discussed the various laws and measures enacted in the previous year and drew up plans for the following one. Each member had a term of one year but this was later increased to three. In 1907, elections were introduced for 18 of the 30 seats in the assembly. This was reduced to 13 in 1913 but increased to 25 in 1916 as a gift by the Raja of Pudukkottai to his subjects.

The Pudukkottai Legislative Council was formed in 1924 and its first session was inaugurated on 29 September 1924 by the Diwan Raghunatha Pallavarayar in the presence of the British Agent for the Madras States Agency, C. W. E. Cotton. The council assumed the functions of the Representative Assembly as well as the advisory council. It had a total of 50 members of whom 35 were elected and the rest, nominated by the raja. One reserved seat each for women and Dalits were introduced in 1927.

== President ==
The sessions of the legislative council were presided over by the diwan or administrator and in his absence, by the assistant diwan. In the absence of both, the sessions were presided over by a deputy president nominated by the diwan.

== Constituencies ==
According to the Pudukkottai Legislative Council Resolution IV of 1924, the "Pudukkottai Legislative Council shall consist of not less than forty and not more than sixty members of whom seventy percent shall be elected and the rest, nominated."

Constituency	Type	Number of seats
Pudukkottai Town	General	4
Pudukkottai Division	General	1
Vallanadu Division	General	2
Alangudi Division	General	2
Varappur Division	General	2
Karambakkudi Division	General	2
Ponnamaravathi Division	General	2
Karaiyur Division	General	2
Thirumayam Division	General	2
Kilanilai Division	General	2
Sengirai Division	General	2
Nirpalani Division	General	2
Kiranur Division	General	2
Kudumiyanmalai Division	General	2
Kunnandarkoil Division	General	2
Muhammadan Constituency	Reserved	1
Christian Constituency	Reserved	1

== Electorate ==
To vote in the elections to the Pudukkottai Legislative Council, a person should be not less than 21 years of age and of sound mind and not a convicted offender under Section IX A of the Indian Penal Code. Those accused of electoral misconduct are automatically barred from voting in the elections for the next five years. The voter should be a subject of the state and should have spent at least 100 days in the preceding year in the state. The person was also required to satisfy the following income criteria:

- Landholders and beneficiaries of inam lands should pay at least Rs. 3 per annum as property tax.
- House-owners should pay at least Rs. 2 per annum as house tax.
- Those employed in non-agricultural professions should receive a salary of more than Rs. 250 per month.
- State pensioners should receive a pension of more than Rs. 25 per month

The subject should be a graduate of any Indian or British university.
