= Alexander Tottenham =

Sir Alexander Robert Loftus Tottenham

Diwan of Pudukkottai
- In office 1934–1946
- Monarch: Rajagopala Tondaiman
- Preceded by: B. G. Holdsworth
- Succeeded by: C. P. Karunakara Menon

Personal details
- Born: 31 July 1873
- Died: 13 December 1946 (aged 73) Pudukkottai, British India
- Occupation: civil servant

Sir Alexander Robert Loftus Tottenham CIE (31 July 1873 – 13 December 1946) was a British civil servant and administrator who served as the Diwan of Pudukkottai state from 1934 to 1944.

== Early life ==
Alexander Tottenham was born to British naval officer John Francis Tottenham and his wife Laura Ellen Dodd Janverin on 31 July 1873. Alexander graduated from Clifton College, Bristol and did his post-graduation from Queen's College, Oxford.

== Career ==
Alexander passed the 1896 Indian Civil Service examinations and arrived in India on 5 December 1897 where he served as District Collector and Assistant Magistrate in the Madras Presidency. From 1923 to 1932, he was as a member of India's Central Board of Revenue. Alexander retired from the Indian Civil Service in 1933 at the age of sixty.

== Pudukkottai ==
In 1934, Tottenham was appointed Diwan of Pudukkottai and he served until his death in 1946. Tottenham is regarded as one of the best administrators of Pudukkottai and promoted arts and industry. A portrait of Alexander Tottenham hangs in the Government Museum, Thirukokarnam.

== Biographies ==
- Nagarajan, Krishnaswami (1992). Sir Alexander Tottenham. N. Ramachandran.
