= Pallavaraiyan =

Pallavaraiyan was a title used by various officials in the medieval Chola and Pandya governments in present-day India. It was borne by persons from different communities like Bhoja, etc. and does not imply a relation to the erstwhile Pallava dynasty.

For example, there is a Perundaram (high dignitary), Irayiravan Pallavarayan, who bore the titles Mummudisola-Posan and Uttama Chola Pallavaraiyan at different times. This officer belonged to the family of Bhoja. Usually the Pallavaraiyan title was assumed by various officials along with the surname of the king like Arumori-Pallavaraiyan, Uttama Chola-Pallavaraiyan, SundaraPandya-Pallavaraiyan, etc. Also the Pallavarayar rulers of Pudukkottai belongs to Kallar (caste) lineage.

Mappillai Pallavarayar was the Chief Magistrate of the Pudukkottai State from 1807 to 1814. He was married to Rajakumari Perundevi Ammal Ai Sahib, the only daughter of the Pudukkottai King Rayaragunatha Thondaiman. After his death, his wife Rajakumari Perundevi Ammal Ai Sahib adopted her husband's younger brother Rangan Pallavarayar as her heir. In 1829, on the orders of the King of Thondaiman, Rangan Pallavarayar built a dam at Sundarapatti in Ilupur Taluk.

== See also ==
- Raghunatha Pallavarayar
