= R. Vedantacharlu =

Indian administrator

Diwan of Pudukkottai
- In office November 1894 – February 1899
- Monarch: Marthanda Bhairava Tondaiman
- Succeeded by: S. Venkataramadas Nayudu

R. Vedantacharlu was an Indian administrator who served as the Diwan (styled Diwan-in-council from 1898 onwards) of Pudukkottai state from November 1894 to February 1899.

== Administration ==
When A. Seshayya Sastri, Diwan of Pudukkottai retired in November 1894, Vedantacharlu who was the Assistant Diwan at the time succeeded him. On assuming charge, Vedantacharlu brought in a number of reforms. The procedure for granting agricultural loans was changed and the settlement of inam lands was undertaken. A Sanskrit school, a technical school and a dairy farm were opened in Pudukkottai. The state, however, soon fell into an economic crisis and the newly opened schools had to be closed shortly afterwards. Magisterial powers were withdrawn from district collectors and a new office of magistrate was created.

The state's devasthanam department was abolished in 1897 and charge of devasthanams was given to the Revenue department. The most noteworthy event of Vedantacharlu's tenure was the creation of the Pudukkottai state council in 1898. The council consisted of two members - the Diwan and a Councillor and was in charge of the administration of the state. The council was headed by the Diwan who was henceforth known as the "Diwan-in-council".

Vedantachalu retired in February 1899 and was succeeded by S. Venkataramadas Nayudu.
