= Thondaman =

Thondaman may refer to:

- Arumugam Thondaman (born 1964), Cabinet Minister of Livestock and Rural Community Development in Sri Lanka
- Jeevan Thondaman (born 1994), Sri Lankan politician
- Ramamirda Thondaman, Indian politician and former Member of the Legislative Assembly of Tamil Nadu
- Savumiamoorthy Thondaman (1913–1999), Sri Lankan politician who represented the Indian Tamils of Sri Lanka
- Thondaman Dynasty derive from the state of Pudkottai, which was created by Raghunatha Thondaiman

== See also ==
- Thandan
- Thandivarman
- Thondaiman
- Tondaiman
- Tondaimans
