= Charubala Tondaiman =

Indian politician

Rani Sarubala Rajammani Ayi Sahib (born 7 October 1958), popularly known as Mayor Sarubala Tondaiman, is an Indian politician and member of the royal house of Pudukkottai. She is the Organising Secretary of AMMK. She was elected mayor of Tiruchirappalli City Corporation two times (2001 and 2005) and was the president of Trichy Unit Tamil Maanila Congress for a brief time. She quit the Tamil Maanila Congress (TMC) and joined the All India Anna Dravida Munnetra Kazhagam (AIADMK) on 15 September 2016. Later, she sided with RK Nagar MLA Dhinakaran to become a higher office holder in the Amma Makkal Munnetra Kazhagam.

== Shooting ==
Sarubala was a keen rifle shooter in her early days. She is the current treasurer of Royal Pudukottai Sports Club.

== Early and personal life ==
Tondaiman was born on 7 October 1958 to Subramaniam, a superintendent engineer of the Tamil Nadu Highways Department and his wife Sarojini, granddaughter of late Sri Bhaskara Tondaiman IFS from Tirunelveli sister of S Ramasundaram IAS, former public works secretary and sister-in-law of Archana Ramasundram IPS. Tondaiman has a masters in arts and philosophy.

She is married to Rajah R. Rajagopala Tondaiman, who is the titular Rajah of Pudukottai, the president of Royal Pudukottai Sports Club and a vice president of the Tamil Nadu Shooting Association. The couple have a son, R. Prithviraj Tondaiman, who is an international trap shooter and the secretary of Royal Pudukottai Sports Club, and a daughter, Radha Niranjani, who is also a national trap shooter and the joint treasurer of Royal Pudukottai Sports Club.

== Politics ==
From her early days, Sarubala has been an active member of the Indian National Congress. She served as the mayor of Tiruchirappalli from 2001 to 2009. During the 2009 and 2014 Lok Sabha elections, she stood from the Tiruchirappalli Lok Sabha constituency and lost to P. Kumar consecutively of the Anna Dravida Munnetra Kazhagam (ADMK) by 4,335 votes and 1,00,300 votes respectively.

Sarubala is currently the joint convenor of the Movement for the Restoration of Vedic Wisdom. She is also the secretary of ACME Matriculation School, Tiruchirappalli, and the Pudukkottai Mannar Educational and Charitable Trust and Mannar Arts & Science College, Tiruchirappalli.

She quit the Tamil Maanila Congress (TMC) and joined the All India Anna Dravida Munnetra Kazhagam (AIADMK) on 15 September 2016.

She contested unsuccessfully in the 2019 parliamentary elections in Tiruchirappalli constituency as an AMMK candidate.
