= Cosmo Grant Niven Edwards =

Cosmo Grant Niven Edwards (c. 1896 – 22 July 1964) was a soldier and British civil servant of the Indian political service who served as resident for the Madras States.

== Early life ==
Born in 1896, Edwards was the son of Rev. James Edwards of Lossiemouth. Edwards was educated at Fettes, Edinburgh and graduated from the Edinburgh University.

== Military career ==
From 1914 to 1919, Edwards served in the British army and was wounded in France in 1917. Edwards also served in the Corps of Guides during the Third Anglo-Afghan War.

== Political service ==
Edwards entered the Indian political service in 1921 and was assigned to the North-West Frontier Province. From 1930 to 1932, Edwards served as under-secretary to the Government of India and from 1934 to 1937, as deputy secretary, Foreign and Political Department, Government of India.

Edwards served as resident for Kalat State from 1938 to 1940, Bhopal from 1940 to 1942, Kolhapur from 1942 to 1944 and the Madras States from 1944 to 1947.

== Death ==
Edwards died on 22 July 1964.
