= B. G. Holdsworth =

Benjamin George Holdsworth

Diwan of Pudukkottai
- In office 1931–1934
- Monarch: Rajagopala Tondaiman
- Preceded by: T. Raghavaiah
- Succeeded by: Alexander Tottenham

Personal details
- Born: 31 July 1892
- Died: 24 July 1949 (aged 56)
- Occupation: civil servant

Benjamin George Holdsworth CIE (31 July 1892 – 24 February 1943) was an Indian civil servant and administrator who served as the Diwan of Pudukkottai state from 1931 to 1933.

== Early life ==
Holdsworth was born on 31 July 1892 to Rev. J. Forster Holdsworth. He had his education at Bristol Grammar School and Brasenose College, Oxford and entered the Indian Civil Service in 1919.

During the First World War, Holdsworth served in Mesopotamia and Palestine with the 1/155 Pioneers.

== In India ==
From 1920 to 1927, Holdsworth served as a settlement officer in the Tanjore, Kistna, and Godavari districts. He was Secretary in the Board of Revenue, Madras Presidency, from 1927 to 1930 and Joint Secretary at the First Indian Round Table Conference.

=== Pudukkottai ===
In November 1931, Holdsworth was appointed Diwan of Pudukkottai, and he served from 1931 to 1934. Holdsworth was responsible for the creation of the Holdsworth Dam in Pudukkottai, which is named after him. The Holdsworth Park in the princely state is also named after Holdsworth.

Holdsworth was relieved in 1934 and succeeded by Alexander Tottenham, of whom, Holdsworth remarked that the people of Pudukkottai state were fortunate to get as Diwan.

== Later life and honours ==
In 1941, Holdsworth was made a Companion of the Order of the Indian Empire.

In 1942, Holdsworth was appointed Secretary to the Indian Food Department and served until his death. Holdsworth died on 24 February 1943 at the age of fifty-one, following complications from a tooth infection; there was a shortage of penicillin due to supplies being redirected for the war effort. He is buried in New Delhi.

== Family ==
Holdsworth was the eldest of four children. His two younger brothers, Joseph and Wesley, were both killed in WWI. His sister was called Hilda.

In 1920, Holdsworth married Ellen May, daughter of James Hill of Poltimore. The couple had one son, Peter, who rose to the rank of Brigadier in the British Army, and one daughter, Pamela.
