= Herbert John Todd =

British civil servant, resident of Madras States 1943-45

Sir Herbert John Todd (1893-1985) was a British civil servant who served as resident for the Madras States from 1943 to 1945.
