= T. Raghavaiah =

Diwan of Travancore

Diwan Bahadur Thodla Raghavaiah CSI

President of the Council of Administration of Pudukkottai state
- In office 28 February 1929 – November 1931
- Monarch: Rajagopala Tondaiman
- Preceded by: Raghunatha Pallavarayar
- Succeeded by: B. G. Holdsworth

Diwan of Travancore
- In office 8 July 1920 – 18 May 1925
- Monarchs: Moolam Thirunal, Sethu Lakshmi Bayi (as regent for Chithira Thirunal)
- Preceded by: M. Krishnan Nair
- Succeeded by: M. E. Watts

President of the Madras Corporation
- In office 1911–1911
- Preceded by: P. L. Moore
- Succeeded by: A. Y. G. Campbell

Diwan Bahadur Thodla Raghavaiah CSI was an Indian administrator who served as the Diwan of Travancore from 1920 to 1925. He was a favourite of the Maharaja Moolam Thirunal. His refusal to allow low-caste to enter Hindu temples is believed to have led to the Vaikom Satyagraha.

== Early life ==
Raghavaiah was born in a Telugu-speaking family from the northern part of the Madras Presidency. He had his education in Madras city and entered the provincial civil service when he was posted as Deputy Collector in 1893. He also served as Special Forest Settlement Officer from 1904 to 1906 and Revenue Officer, Madras Corporation from 1906.

== Diwan of Travancore ==
Raghavaiah was appointed Diwan of Travancore in 1920, replacing M. Krishnan Nair. Ragahvaiah's administration is considered to be a mixture of progress as well as discontent. He is credited with having reformed the electoral system in Travancore. However, Raghavaiah's diwanship is remembered as a period of turbulence and discontent. In 1920, he raised the tuition fees for students in government colleges. This was followed by protests all over the state.

Untouchables had been prohibited from entering the Vaikom temple since time immemorial. In the early 1920s, however, though the efforts of politician T. K. Madhavan, the Indian nationalist Indian National Congress resolved to put an end to the practice. Madhavan petitioned Raghavaiah, the then Diwan in 1924, to introduce a legislation enabling untouchables to enter the Vaikom temple and other temples in the kingdom. But Raghavaiah being a staunch, orthodox, upper-caste Hindu, refused. This led to widespread agitations throughout and made the administration highly unpopular.

== Honours ==
Raghavaih was made a Diwan Bahadur in 1921 and a Companion of the Order of the Star of India in 1924.
