= Molly Fink =

Australian socialite

Queen Molly
- Molly in 1915

Queen Consort of Pudukkottai
- Tenure: 10 August 1915 – 28 May 1928
- Born: Esme Mary Sorrett Fink; 15 September 1896; Malvern, Melbourne, Australia
- Died: 20 November 1967 (aged 71); Cannes, Provence-Alpes-Côte d'Azur, France
- Burial: Golders Green Crematorium, London, England
- Spouse: King Martanda Bhairava I of Pudukkottai (m. 1915 - 1927; his death)
- Issue: Prince Martanda Sydney Tondaiman
Names
- Esme Mary Sorrett
- Father: Wolfe Fink
- Mother: Elizabeth Hamilton Watt

Esme Mary Sorrett Fink (15 September 1894 – 20 November 1967), popularly known as Molly Fink was an Australian socialite and wife of Martanda Bhairava Tondaiman, the Raja of the princely state of Pudukkottai. The marriage created a public scandal and resulted in the ostracization of the couple and their only son Martanda Sydney Tondaiman.

== Early life ==
Fink was born to Wolfe Fink, a barrister and Shakespearan scholar and his wife Elizabeth on 15 September 1894 at Malvern in Melbourne, Australia. Molly had her early schooling at Lauriston Girls' School where she studied English, French, German and Latin. At the age of fifteen, Fink discontinued her studies after being expelled from Lauriston Girls' School for misbehaviour.

Tragedy struck the family before the First World War when Wolfe Fink died of a ruptured aorta. In dire financial straits, Elizabeth rented an apartment in Hotel Majestic Mansions to which the family moved.

== Marriage ==
In March 1915, Martanda Bhairava Tondaiman, the Raja of Pudukkottai came to Australia on a visit and checked in at the Hotel Majestic Mansions where he met Molly Fink at the dining room. He was enamoured by Molly Fink and joined Molly, her mother and sister at Hotel Hydro Majestic near Sydney and subsequently accompanied them when they returned to Melbourne. Five months later, Martanda proposed to her and she accepted. The couple got engaged on 6 August 1915 and married on 10 August 1915 at the registrar's office in Melbourne. The newly-wed couple went to San Francisco in August 1915 to see the Panama Exhibition. Martanda returned to India with his Australian bride in October 1915.

== In British India ==
Molly spent five months in British India suffering ostracism by the British officialdom, even surviving a poisoning attempt. On 22 November 1915, Martanda presented his new Maharani to his subjects at a lavish public ceremony in Pudukkottai. However, though a warm welcome was accorded by the people of Pudukkottai state, the government of British India refused to grant her official recognition. Afflicted by a sudden, mysterious bout of vomiting and diarrhoea soon after her arrival in Pudukkottai, Molly was moved first to Trichinopoly and then to Sylk's Hotel, Ootacamund by Martanda. Soon after checking in at Sylk's Hotel, Martanda had Molly's health examined by his Major Robb, a government medical examiner who found traces of oleander, a traditional poison in her vomitus. Martanda applied to the Indian government for the purchase of a house in Ootacamund for Molly's safety but the officials refused. Frustrated, Martanda left India with Molly in 1916.

== Later years ==
The couple settled down in Australia where their first son Martanda Sydney Tondaiman was born on 22 July 1916. In Australia, both Martanda and Molly developed a wide social circle. Martanda developed a passion for horse racing while Molly became popular at parties and balls for the exquisite jewels and wardrobe she wore. When official recognition for Molly was not forthcoming, Martanda and Molly moved to London and purchased a flat at Park Lane in August 1919. When at an audience with George V, Martanda was told by the Secretary of State for India that their son Sydney would not be recognised as the rightful heir by the Government of British India, Martanda renounced his own claim to the throne and nominating his brother Rajagopala Tondaiman as the Raja of Pudukkottai, Martanda settled for an annual pension.

Martanda and Molly lived in Cannes from 1922 to 1927 where they bought a villa called La Favorite. At Cannes, Molly developed friendship with Elsa Maxwell, Cecil Beaton, Nancy Beaton, Lord Donegall, Lady Houston and William Locke. The couple frequented social events and held dinner parties. Martanda died at Paris on 28 May 1928 at the age of fifty-three. Molly wanted his body to be shipped to India and cremated with full state honours but the Government of India refused permission. Eventually, the body was cremated at Golders Green Crematorium in London as per Hindu rites.

Following Martanda's death, Molly's finances began to dwindle. She sold La Favorite and purchased a house at Mayfair, London where she lived with her son, Sydney. Aga Khan III proposed to her soon after Martanda's death, but she rejected his proposal. In her later years, Molly remained aloof and began drinking heavily. She was diagnosed with bowel cancer in 1967. Molly died in Cannes on 22 November 1967 at the age of seventy-three.
