= S. Venkataramadas Nayudu =

Indian administrator

Diwan Bahadur S. Venkataramadas Nayudu

Diwan of Pudukkottai
- In office 1899–1909
- Monarch: Marthanda Bhairava Tondaiman
- Preceded by: R. Vedantacharlu
- Succeeded by: Raghunatha Pallavarayar

Diwan Bahadur Siram Venkataramadas Nayudu was an Indian administrator who served as Diwan of the Pudukkottai state from 1899 to 1909. He was the Chief Secretary and Magistrate of Madras Presidency

== As Diwan ==
Siram Venkataramadas Nayudu was appointed Diwan by the Raja, Martanda Bhairava Tondaiman in 1899, just before his departure for England. Nayudu brought ministerial expenditure under budgetary restrictions and created the office of Treasury Officer. He inaugurated the Pudukkottai Representative Assembly in 1902.

== Personal ==
Venkataramadas Nayudu was a distinguished alumnus of the Madras Presidency College. He was directly recruited as a Deputy Collector by the Madras government and eventually became Chief Presidency Magistrate and Secretary, Board of Revenue at Madras. In recognition of his distinguished public service he was awarded the Diwan Bahadur title of honor.

His nephew and foster son Siram Govindarajulu Naidu was educated at Madras Christian College and Magdalene College, University of Cambridge. He was the principal of Madras Law College, Director of Public Instruction for Madras state and the new formed Andhra state, the founding vice-chancellor of Sri Venkateswara University, Tirupati and the chairman of the Southern Language Book Trust.
