= A. Seshayya Sastri =

Indian administrator (1828–1903)

Sir Amaravati Seshayya Sastri
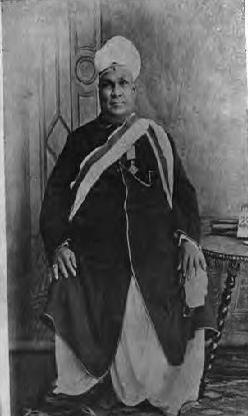
- Portrait of Sir A. Seshayya Sastri

Diwan of Pudukkottai
- In office 1878–1894
- Monarchs: Ramachandra Tondaiman (1878-1886), Marthanda Bhairava Tondaiman (1886-1894)
- Succeeded by: R. Vedantacharlu

Diwan of Travancore
- In office May 1872 – 1877
- Monarch: Ayilyam Thirunal of Travancore
- Preceded by: T. Madhava Rao
- Succeeded by: Nanoo Pillai

Personal details
- Born: 22 March 1828 Tanjore, Madras Presidency, India
- Died: 29 October 1903 (aged 75) Madras Presidency, India
- Spouse: Sundari
- Education: Madras University
- Occupation: lawyer, Administrator
- Profession: Statesman

Sir Amaravati Seshayya Sastri KCSI (22 March 1828 – 29 October 1903), or Sashiah Sastri, was an Indian administrator who served as the Diwan of Travancore from May 1872 to 4 May 1877 and as the Diwan of Pudukkottai from 1878 to 1894. He is credited with having modernized the city of Pudukkottai.

Seshayya Sastri was born in the village of Amaravati in Tanjore district, Madras Presidency in 1828 in a poor Hindu family. At the age of nine, Seshayya Sastri moved to Madras city with his uncle Gopala Aiyer. Seshayya Sastri had his schooling and higher education in Madras and graduated in 1848 in first class.

In 1848, Seshayya Sastri was employed as a clerk in the Revenue Office and rose to become Tahsildar, Naib Sheristadar and later, Head Sheristadar. In 1872, Seshayya Sastri was appointed Diwan of Travancore and served from 1872 to 1877, when palace intrigues forced him to quit. Seshayya Sastri served as Diwan of Pudukkottai from 1878 to 1886 and Diwan-Regent from 1886 to 1894. He rebuilt the town of Pudukkottai and created the Pudukulam Lake. Seshayya Sastri retired from service in 1894. He died on 29 October 1903 at the age of 75.

Seshayya Sastri was made a Knight Commander of the Order of the Star of India in 1902.

== Early life ==
Seshayya Sastri was born on 22 March 1828 in the village of Amaravati in Tanjore district He was the youngest of six children and his father was a Vaidika priest. Sastri's parents were poor and he had a troubled upbringing. At a very early age, he moved with his uncle Gopala Aiyer, to Madras. In Madras, he learnt Tamil from a private tuition master and had his first English lessons at a school run by a Portuguese named Francis Rodriques. In 1837, Seshayya Sastri joined Anderson's school. As a child, Seshayya Sastri mastered verses from the Bible and became a favorite with the Rev. Mr. Anderson. In 1840, as a result of violent protests and accusations of proselytization against Anderson, an Education Board was set up by the Madras Government and a preparatory and a high school established by the board. Seshayya Sastri joined the preparatory school in 1841. The school was later upgraded to a high school and Seshayya Sastri studied in the school till 1848 when financial difficulties forced him to quit. The headmaster of the school was the legendary E. B. Powell who took a special liking for the boy. Sastri's classmates at the school were the illustrious Ramiengar and T. Madhava Rao. In 1848, he joined Pachaiyappa's school and studied with the aid of a regular stipend from the Government.

Meanwhile, Sastri's uncle Gopala Aiyer died in 1847. The very same year Seshayya Sastri married Sundari, a native of Konerirajapuram and became a householder. Seshayya Sastri rigorously practised oratory and drama along with his close friend Ramiengar. He graduated on 29 May 1848 in first class. In September 1848, Sastri was employed as a clerk in the Revenue Office.

== Career ==
Seshayya Sastri's performance as a clerk won him a place in the Roving Commission. Later, Seshayya was transferred to the Currents Department and was eventually appointed Tahsildar of Masulipatnam in May 1851. Sastri was promoted as Naib Sheristadar in 1853 and Head Sheristadar on 5 November 1855. Seshayya served in the Imam Commission from November 1858 to 1865, when he was appointed Deputy Collector of Tanjore. Sastri took charge in April 1866 and served for a year till he was appointed Vice President of the Tanjore municipality. In 1869, Seshayya was appointed Head Sheristadar of the Board of Revenue. In May 1872, he succeeded his classmate Madhava Rao as the Dewan of Travancore.

== As Dewan of Travancore ==
During the tenure of Seshayya Sastri as Dewan, the Varkala Tunnel connecting two lakes in Varkala, forty kilometres from Tiruvananthapuram city was opened for traffic. The first systematic census of Travancore state was taken on 18 May 1875.

Seshayya Sastri became Dewan at a time when Travancore was gripped by political intrigues. Sastri's predecessor Madhava Rao had tried to overrule the king and was dismissed. Sastri, too, was dominant and uncompromising as Madhava Rao and had frequent clashes with the king. Notwithstanding this strained relationship, Kerala Varma, the ruler of Cochin, wrote a letter to Seshayya Sastri warning him about the designs of Maharaja Ayilyam Thirunal but the letter fell into the hands of the Raja of Travancore.

In August 1877, Seshayya Sastri resigned as Diwan of Travancore and retired to Trichinopoly where he was appointed Vice-President and Secretary of the Mansion House Famine Relief Committee. In January 1878, Seshayya was nominated to the Madras Legislative Council and served till August 1878 when he took charge as the Diwan of Pudukkottai.

== As Dewan of Pudukkottai ==
In 1878, when Ramachandra Tondaiman was the ruler of Pudukkottai, Seshayya Sastri was appointed Dewan. He brought forth a number of reforms. He remodelled the town and rebuilt it incorporating modern principles of town planning. The Pudukkottai administrative office building was constructed during the tenure of Seshayya Sastri. The famous Pudukkulam Lake in Pudukkottai was a creation of Seshayya Sastri. Under Seshayya Sastri's advice, Ramachandra Tondaiman renovated many temples in the state. At the suggestion of his Tanjore-born wife, Ramachandra Tondaiman adopted the name "Brihadambaldas" with consent of Dewan Seshayya Sastri.

In 1886, Ramachandra Tondaiman died and Martanda Bhairava Tondaiman, then a minor, succeeded to the throne of Pudukkottai. Seshayya Sastri, who was the Dewan, ruled Pudukkottai as Regent till Martanda Bhairava Tondaiman came of age. His tenure as dewan came to an end in 1894 and he returned to private life.

== Later life ==
In 1902, Seshayya Sastri was knighted for his services to the Crown.

Seshayya Sastri died on 29 October 1903.

== Honours ==
Seshayya Sastri was made a fellow of the University of Madras in 1868 and on 1 January 1878, made a Companion of the Order of the Star of India in the New Year Honour's List. In 1901, Seshayya Sastri was made a Knight Commander of the Order of the Star of India in the King's Birthday Honour's List.
