= C. P. Karunakara Menon =

Indian civil servant and administrator

Diwan Bahadur Cherubala Pathayapura Karunakara Menon

Diwan of Pudukkottai
- In office 1947 – 3 March 1948
- Monarch: Rajagopala Tondaiman
- Succeeded by: Princely state dissolved

Diwan of Cochin
- In office 1947–1947
- Preceded by: G. T. Boag
- Succeeded by: Princely state dissolved

Personal details
- Born: 1891 Chittur, Cochin kingdom
- Died: 1976 (aged 84–85) Chittur, Kerala

Diwan Bahadur Cherubala Pathayapura Karunakara Menon (1891–1976) was an Indian civil servant and administrator who served as the Diwan of Cochin kingdom from 1944 to 1947. He was the last Diwan of the kingdom and served until its accession to the Indian Union.

== Early life and education ==
Karunakara Menon was born in 1891 in the town of Chittur in the then Cochin kingdom in a family of six. Menon had his schooling in Chittur and graduated from the Presidency College, Madras.

== Career ==
On completion of his education, Menon joined the Madras Board of Revenue as a clerk. When the first Indian National Congress government was formed in the Madras Presidency as per the Government of India Act 1935, Karunakara Menon was appointed Secretary in the Public Service Commission.

Menon was soon transferred as district collector of South Canara and to the Development Department as Secretary. When the Second World War broke out, Menon was appointed Regional Food Commissioner of the Government of India and then, transferred to Delhi to take over as Director-General of Food.

In 1944, Menon succeeded G. T. Boag as the Diwan of Cochin kingdom and served till 15 August 1947, when India obtained independence. He presided over the state's accession to the Republic of India.

== Later life ==
In his later life, Karunakara Menon served as an advisor to the Indian government and was instrumental in setting up the Chittur College. Karunakara Menon died in 1976 at the age of 85.
