= Pattathurani =

Pattathurani Sornakkadu
- village
- Country: India
- State: Tamil Nadu
- District: Thanjavur

Area
  - Total: 4 km^{2} (1.5 sq mi)

Population (March 2011)
  - Total: 1,500
  - Density: 380/km^{2} (970/sq mi)

Languages
  - Official: Tamil
- Time zone: UTC+5:30 (IST)
- PIN: 614801
- Telephone code: 04373
- Vehicle registration: TN 49
- Nearest city: Aranthangi
- Sex ratio: 1:0.7 ♂/♀
- Literacy: 60%
- Lok Sabha constituency: Thanjavur
- Vidhan Sabha constituency: Peravurani

Pattathurani is a village located on the border of the Thanjavur and Pudukkottai districts in Tamil Nadu, India. It is 16 kilometers far east of Aranthangi.
