= R. Rajagopala Tondaiman =

Indian socialite (born 1957)

Rajah Rajagopala Tondaiman
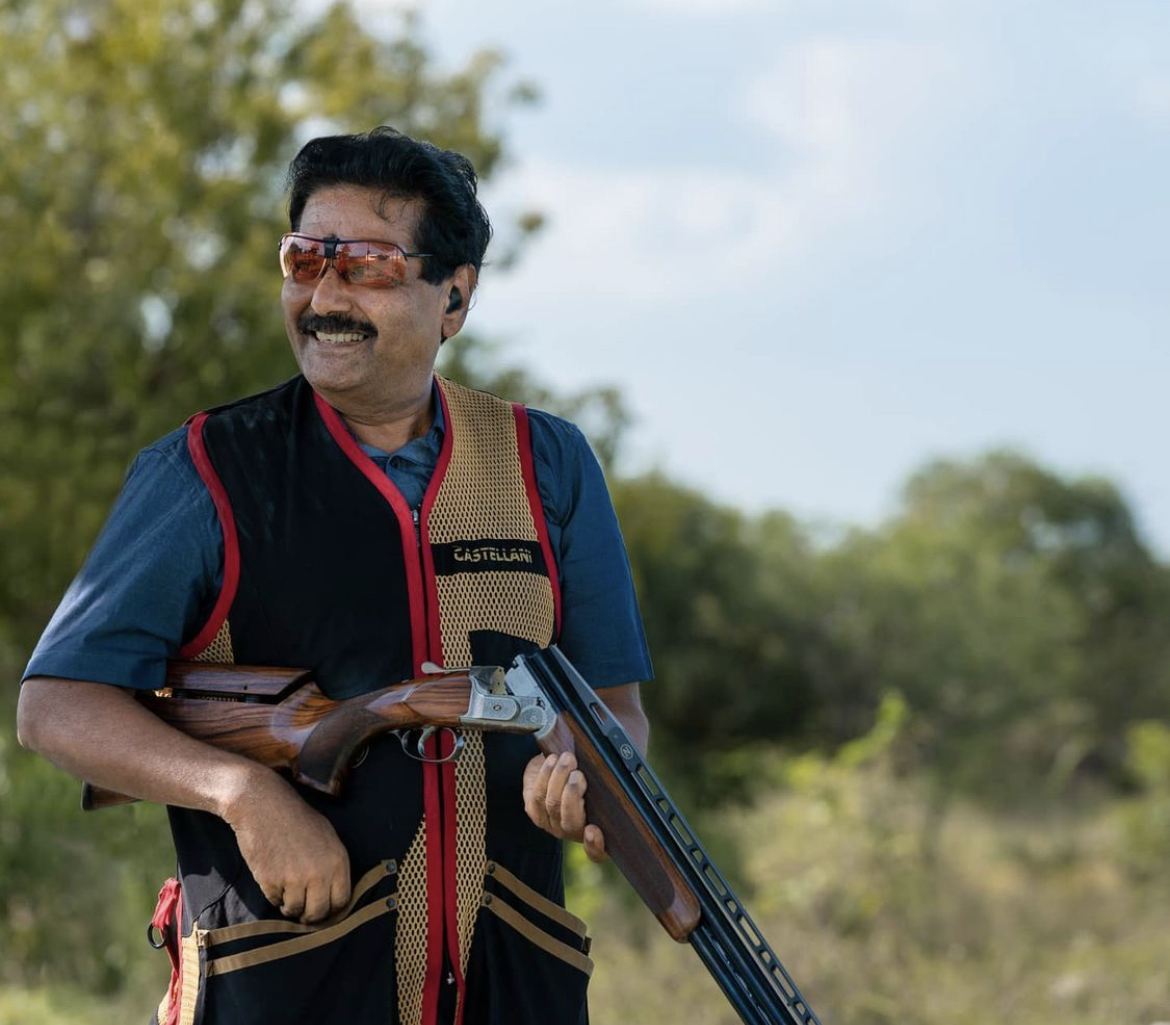
- Born: 6 September 1957 (age 68); Thiruchirapalli, Madras State, India
- Other names: Rajah, RRR Tondaiman
- Occupation: Socialite
- Employer(s): Royal Pudukottai Sports Club, Tamil Nadu Shooting Association
- Title: Titular Rajah of Pudukkottai
- Term: 1992-incumbent
- Spouse: Sarubala Tondaiman
- Children: Prithviraj Tondaiman Radha Niranjani Rajayee

Sri Brahdamba Dasa Rajah Rajagopala Tondaiman Bahadur, popularly known as Rajah Rajagopala Tondaiman, is an Indian socialite and the present head of the royal house of Pudukkottai. He is a shotgun shooter and is married to politician AMMK Organising Secretary Tmt. Sarubala Tondaiman.

== Early life ==
Rajagopala Tondaiman was born on 6 September 1957 to Prince Radhakrishna Tondaiman, the younger brother of Rajah Rajagopala Tondaiman, and his wife, Mathusri Raja Srimathi Rani Rema Devi Rajammani Bayi Sahib. Rajagopal finished his schooling and college at Trichy. He was adopted at an early age by his uncle and the last Maharajah of Pudukottai, Maharajah Rajagopala Tondaiman.

== Public life ==
Rajagopala Tondaiman became the titular Rajah of Pudukkottai upon the death of his uncle Rajagopala Tondaiman on 16 January 1997. The position is ceremonial and heads some family-owned trusts, a patron of a few clubs and hereditary trustee of temples.

He is a skeet shooter and is the president of the Royal Pudukkottai Sports Club, which trains shooters in Trap, Double Trap and Skeet Events and Vice President of the Tamil Nadu Shooting Association. He is a Convenor for the Movement for the Restoration of Vedic Wisdom.

== Family ==
He is married to Rani Sarubala Tondaiman, who is the organising secretary of Amma Makkal Munnettra Kazhagam, former mayor of Tiruchirappalli and the treasurer of Royal Pudukottai Sports Club. The couple have a son, R. Prithviraj Tondaiman, who is an International Trap Shooter and the Secretary of Royal Pudukottai Sports Club, and a daughter, Radha Niranjani, who is also a national trap shooter and the Joint Treasurer of Royal Pudukottai Sports Club.
