= Raghunatha Pallavarayar =

Indian civil servant and administrator (1872–1930)

Rajkumar Vijaya Raghunatha Pallavarayar Dorai Raja

Diwan of Pudukkottai
- In office 1909 – February 1929
- Monarchs: Martanda Bhairava Tondaiman, Rajagopala Tondaiman

Personal details
- Born: 1872 Pudukkottai state
- Died: 1930 (aged 57–58)
- Relations: Ramachandra Tondaiman, Martanda Bhairava Tondaiman
- Children: Died without issue
- Education: Madras University
- Occupation: Civil servant, administrator

Vijaya Raghunatha Pallavarayar Dorai Raja (1872–1930) was an Indian civil servant and administrator and a member of the royal house of Pudukkottai. He served as the Chief Minister of Pudukkottai state from 1909 to 1922 and regent from 1922 to 1929.

== Early life and education ==
Raghunatha Pallavarayar was born in 1872 in Pudukkottai, the eldest son of Princess Brihadambal, the elder princess of Pudukkottai and her husband M.R.Ry. Kolandaswami Pallavarayar Sahib. He was the grandson of Ramachandra Tondaiman the then Raja of Pudukkottai and the eldest brother of Martanda Bhairava Tondaiman.

Pallavarayar graduated in arts from the University of Madras and joined the Madras Civil Service, serving as a Deputy Collector for a short period.

== Administration of Pudukkottai state ==
Raghunatha Pallavarayar served as a member of the Pudukkottai State Council from 1898 to 1909. In 1909, he was appointed Chief Minister or Diwan of Pudukkottai and served till 1922, under his younger brother, the Raja of Pudukkottai. In 1922, when Martanda Bhairava Tondaiman formally gave up the administration of the state and agree to remain as "Raja" in title only, he appointed Raghunatha Pallavarayar to rule the state. When six-year-old Rajagopala Tondaiman succeeded to the throne on the death of Martanda Bhairava Tondaiman on 28 May 1928, Raghunatha Pallavarayar continued as regent formally relinquishing his office in February 1929, with the appointment of a regency council by the Government of India.

== Personal life & Death ==
Vijaya Raghunatha Pallavarayar Dorai Rajah married a Scottish music teacher, Muriel Briggs, after his engagement to an Englishwoman was broken off in 1914. He was popularly known as Uncle Do. He lived with his wife Muriel at Tredis, the bungalow owned by the Tondaimans in Kodaikanal. Her memory still lingers in the bungalow along with her piano and her sheets of music. Raghunatha Pallavarayar died in 1930 at the age of fifty-seven or fifty-eight.
