= Government Museum, Pudukkottai =

Museum located in the town of Pudukkottai

Coordinates: 10.389013°N 78.799667°E

This Government Museum is a museum located in the town of Pudukkottai of Pudukkottai District. This is the second largest museum of Tamil Nadu after Government Museum, Chennai. The museum is divided into sections covering zoology, geology, paintings, anthropology, epigraphy. Rare ancient stone and Bronze sculptures are also found here.

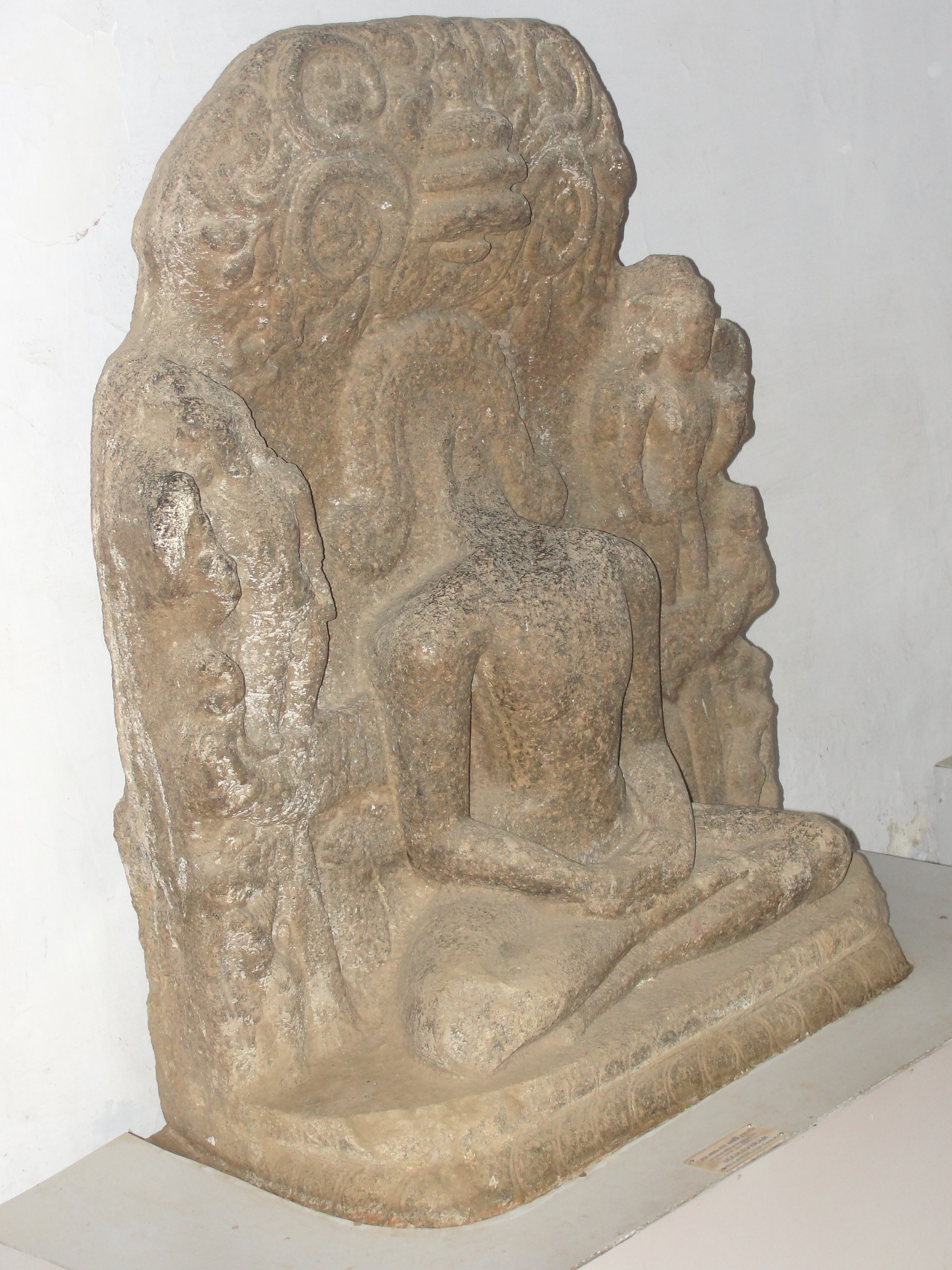
A sculpture in Pudukkottai museum
