= C. W. E. Cotton =

Charles William Egerton Cotton CSI CIE

Agent for the Madras States Agency
- In office 1923–1928
- Preceded by: None (post created)
- Succeeded by: C. G. Croswaithe

Chief Secretary to the Government of the Madras Presidency
- In office 1929–1931
- Premier: P. Subbarayan, B. Munuswamy Naidu
- Succeeded by: G. T. H. Bracken

Personal details
- Born: 14 August 1874
- Died: 6 September 1931 (aged 57) Madras, British India
- Education: Eton College, University College, Oxford

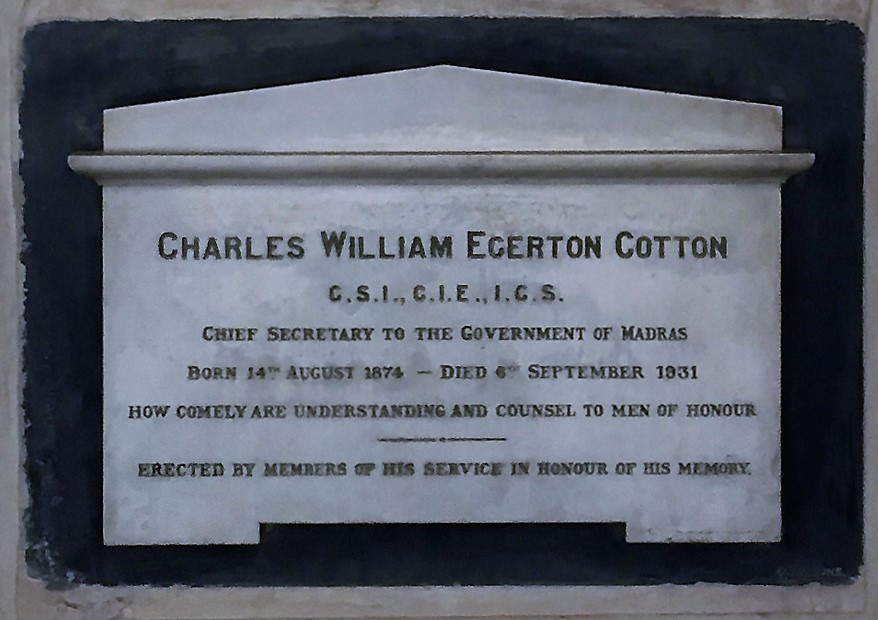
C. W. E. Cotton Memorial, St. Mary's Church, Madras

Charles William Egerton Cotton CSI CIE (14 August 1874 – 6 September 1931) was a British civil servant of the Indian civil service who served as Chief Secretary of Madras and the Agent of the Governor-General for the Madras States.

== Early life ==
Born in England on 14 August 1874, Cotton graduated from Eton College and University College, Oxford and qualified for the Indian Civil Service in 1897.

== Career ==
Cotton arrived in India on 8 December 1898 and served as Assistant Collector and magistrate in the Madras Presidency. After serving as Collector of Customs and Director of Industries in the early 1920s, Cotton was, in 1923, appointed the Governor-General's first agent for the Madras States and stationed at Trivandrum in the state of Travancore. Cotton served as agent till 1928. On 29 September 1924, Cotton inaugurated the first session of the Pudukkottai Legislative Council.

== Later life ==
In 1930, Cotton was appointed Chief Secretary to the Madras government. He died on 5 September 1931 at the age of fifty-seven and was buried in St. Mary's Church, Chennai.
