= Ramachandra Tondaiman =

Raja of Pudukkottai from 1839 to 1886

- Seated in his palace, 1858

Raja of Pudukkottai
- Reign: 13 July 1839 – 15 April 1886
- Coronation: 13 July 1839
- Predecessor: Raghunatha Tondaiman II
- Successor: Martanda Bhairava Tondaiman
- Born: 20 October 1829; Pudukkottai, Pudukkottai state
- Died: 15 April 1886 (aged 56); Pudukkottai
- Issue: Kamalambal Rajammani Bayi Sahib, Mangalambal Rajammani Bayi Sahib, Sivarama Raghunatha Tondaiman, Brihadambal Rajammani Bayi Sahib
- House: Pudukottai
- Father: Raghunatha Tondaiman
- Mother: Rani Kamalambal Ayi Sahib

Raja Sri Brahdamba Dasa Raja Ramachandra Tondaiman Bahadur (20 October 1829 – 15 April 1886) was the ruler of princely state of Pudukkottai from 13 July 1839 to 15 April 1886.

== Early life ==
Ramachandra Tondaiman was born in Pudukkottai on 20 October 1829 to Raghunatha Tondaiman, the Raja of Pudukkottai kingdom and his second wife, Rani Kamalambal Ayi Sahib. He was educated in private and succeeded to throne at the age of nine on the death of his father with the British political agent at Pudukkottai acting as the regent.

== Reign ==
Pudukkottai was administered by a regent in the early years of Ramachandra's reign. Soon after his accession, Ramachandra was awarded the style of "His Excellency" by the British government. In 1844, Ramachandra, formally, assumed control of the government.

Ramachandra's administration was allegedly marked by extravagance and financial mismanagement. He was punished by the British government who twice revoked the permission to use the style "His Excellency" in 1859 and 1873. In 1878, at the advice of Sir T. Madhava Rao, the Madras government appointed A. Seshayya Sastri, former Diwan of Travancore as the Diwan of Pudukkottai. Sastri reformed the administration and rebuilt the city of Pudukkottai as per modern principles of town planning. The Pudukulam and Pallavankulam tanks in the city were renovated and a Post and Telegraph Office was inaugurated in 1884. At Sastri's suggestion, Ramachandra renovated many Hindu temples in the state. In 1881, Ramachandra officially adopted the hereditary title "Brihadambadas" with the consent of Sastri.

Ramachandra was awarded the style "His Highness" on 16 May 1884 along with an 11-gun salute. He was awarded the Prince of Wales medal in 1875 and the Empress of India Medal in gold in 1877.

== Family ==
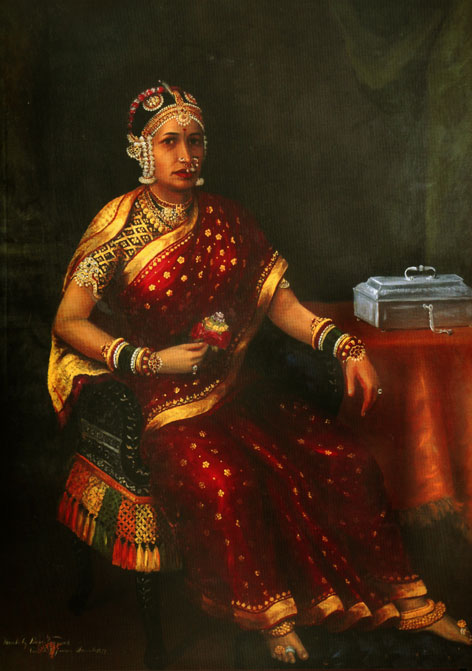
HH Subbamma Bai Sahib Rani of Pudukottai, consort of Ramachandra Tondaiman

Ramachandra Tondaiman married Rani Brihadambal Rajammani Bayi Sahib on 13 June 1845. The couple had two daughters.

- Kamalambal Rajammani Bayi Sahib (d. 24 January 1903)
- Mangalambal Rajammani Bayi Sahib (d. 1873)

Ramachandra married for a second time, to Janaki Subbammal, the eldest daughter of the zamindar of Neduvasal on 31 August 1848. The couple had a son and a daughter

- Sivarama Raghunatha Tondaiman (died 1867)
- Brihadambal Rajammani Bayi Sahib (1852–1903)

Since Sivarama Raghunatha Tondaiman, Ramachandra Tondaiman's only son predeceased him, Ramachandra adopted Martanda Bhairava Tondaiman, son of his daughter Brihadambal, and designated him heir-apparent to the throne.

== Patronage of music ==
Ramachandra Tondaiman patronised music and organised Carnatic music concerts in his palace. Ramachandra Tondaiman, himself, was a prolific composer and set his drama Kuruvaji Nataka to music and had it enacted at the Viralimalai Murugan temple.
