= Vijaya Raghunatha Raya Tondaiman II =

Raja of Pudukkottai from 1807 to 1825

Raja of Pudukkottai
- Reign: 1 February 1807 – 4 June 1825
- Coronation: 1 February 1807
- Predecessor: Vijaya Raghunatha Tondaiman
- Successor: Raghunatha Tondaiman II
- Born: c 1797; Pudukkottai, Pudukkottai state
- Died: 4 June 1825 (age 28); Pudukkottai
- House: Pudukkottai
- Father: Vijaya Raghunatha Tondaiman
- Mother: Rani Ayi Ammani Ayi Sahib

Vijaya Raghunatha Raya Tondaiman (c 1797 - 4 June 1825) was the ruler of the princely state of Pudukkottai from 1 February 1807 to 4 June 1825.

== Early life ==
Vijaya Raghunatha Raya Tondaiman was born in 1797 to Vijaya Raghunatha Tondaiman, Raja of Pudukkottai kingdom, and his second wife, Rani Ayi Ammani Ayi Sahib Avargal in Pudukkottai and was educated by a private tutor. He was the elder of two sons of Vijaya Raghunatha Tondaiman who survived him.

== Reign ==
Vijaya Raghunatha Raya Tondaiman ascended the throne on 1 February 1807 on the death of his father, Vijaya Raghunatha Tondaiman. The administration as in the hands of a Council of Superintendence headed by the Resident of Tanjore, William Blackburn till 1817, when Vijaya Raghunatha Raya attained majority.

William Blackburn completely rebuilt the city with wider roads, tiled houses and public buildings. A new palace was constructed for the Raja in 1825. Blackburn introduced Marathi as the language of administration and it remained the official language of Pudukkottai state for seventy-five years.

== Death ==
Vijaya Raghunatha Raya Tondaiman died of a mysterious illness on 4 June 1825. He was succeeded by his brother, Raghunatha Tondaiman II.

== Family ==
In 1812, Vijaya Raghunatha Raya Tondaiman married a daughter of M.R.Ry. Sri Singappuli Aiyar. He also married a second time, to a daughter of Thirumalai Panrikondran. Vijaya Raghunatha Raya Tondaiman had one son and one daughter.

- Vijaya Raghunatha Raya Tondaiman (died 23 December 1823)
- Rajkumari Rajammani Bayi Sahib
