= Raghunatha Tondaiman II =

Raja of Pudukkottai from 1825 to 1839

Raja of Pudukkottai
- Reign: 20 July 1825 – 13 July 1839
- Coronation: 20 July 1825
- Predecessor: Vijaya Raghunatha Raya Tondaiman II
- Successor: Ramachandra Tondaiman
- Born: c.1798 Pudukkottai, Pudukkottai state
- Died: 13 July 1839 (age 41); Pudukkottai
- House: Pudukkottai
- Father: Vijaya Raghunatha Tondaiman
- Mother: Rani Ayi Ammani Ayi Sahib

Raja Sri Raghunatha Tondaiman Bahadur (c. 1798 – 13 July 1839) was the ruler of the princely state of Pudukkottai from 4 June 1825 to 13 July 1839.

== Early life ==
Raghunatha Tondaiman was born in 1798 to Vijaya Raghunatha Tondaiman, Raja of Pudukkottai kingdom, and his second wife, Rani Ayi Ammani Ayi Sahib Avargal in Pudukkottai and was educated by a private tutor. Raghunatha was the youngest of two sons of Vijaya Raghunatha Tondaiman who survived him. Raghunatha Tondaiman succeeded to the throne on the premature death of his elder brother Vijaya Raghunatha Raya Tondaiman II in June 1825.

== Reign ==
Raghunatha Tondaiman reigned for 14 years from his coronation on 20 July 1825. His reign was largely uneventful. In 1837, Raghunatha Tondaiman suggested a scheme to bring Cauvery River water into Pudukkottai state but could not execute it due to lack of funds. Raghunatha Tondaiman was permitted the style "His Excellency" on 2 April 1830 along with a 17-gun salute.

== Family ==
Raghunatha was married twice, first in 1812, to a daughter of M.R.Ry. Sri Suryamurti Panrikondran, of Kallakurichi. Later he married Rani Kamalambal Ayi Sahib. The couple had two sons and two daughters.

- Rajkumari Periya Rajammani Bayi Sahib (died 1836)
- Rajkumari Chinna Rajammani Bayi Sahib (died 1840)
- Ramachandra Tondaiman (1829–1886)
- Thirumalai Tondaiman (1831–1871)
