= Rajagopala Tondaiman =

Raja of Pudukkottai from 1928 to 1948

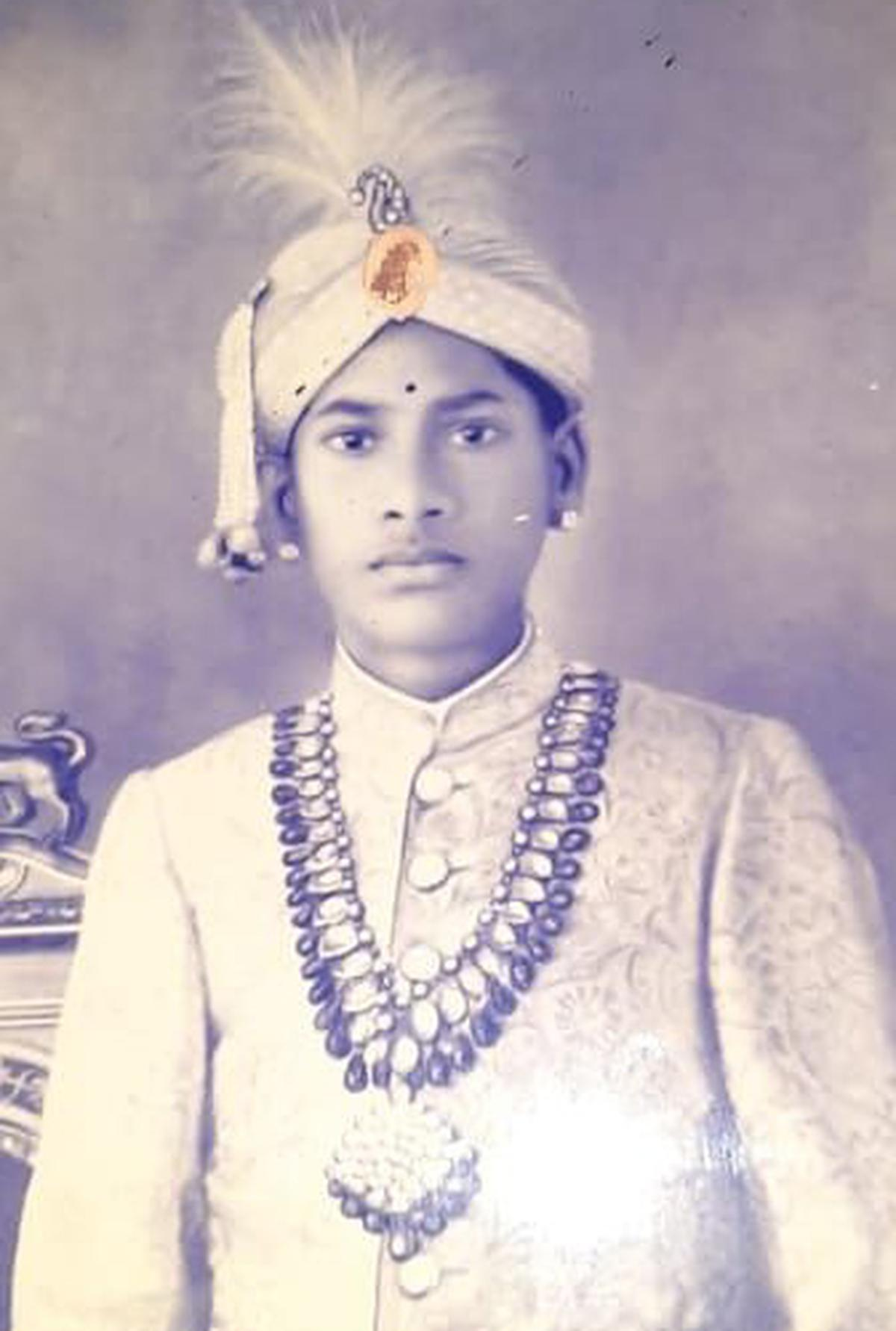
- Formal portrait, c. 1930s

Raja of Pudukkottai
- Reign: 24 October 1928 – 3 March 1948
- Coronation: 24 October 1928
- Predecessor: Martanda Bhairava Tondaiman
- Successor: R. Rajagopala Tondaiman
- Diwan: Raghunatha Pallavarayar, T. Raghavaiah, B. G. Holdsworth, Alexander Tottenham, C. P. Karunakara Menon
- Born: 23 June 1922; Pudukkottai, Pudukkottai state
- Died: 16 January 1997 (aged 74); Chennai, India
- House: Pudukkottai

Raja Sri Brahdamba Dasa Raja Sri Rajagopala Tondaiman Bahadur (23 June 1922 – 16 January 1997) was the ninth and last ruler of the princely state of Pudukkottai.

== Early life ==
Rajagopala Tondaiman was born to Prince Ramachandra Tondaiman and his second wife, Mathusri Raja Srimathi Rani Janaki Ayi Sahib, on 23 June 1922.

== Reign ==
On 19 November 1928, six-year-old Rajagopala Tondaiman was appointed to succeed Martanda Bhairava Tondaiman as the Raja of Pudukkottai kingdom, as Martanda Bhairava had married an Australian wife, Molly Fink. This was heavily discouraged by the British Imperial government, resulting in public scandal and dethronement of the previous Raja, and the appointment of Rajagopala Tondaiman to succeed.

Raghunatha Pallavarayar served as regent until February 1929. From February 1929 to 17 January 1944, the state was governed by a council of regency appointed by the British. Rajagopala took over the administration on 17 January 1944. On 3 March 1948, Rajagopala Tondaiman acceded to the dominion of India. The princely state became a part of Trichirappalli district of the Madras Presidency.

Rajagopala Tondaiman served as the President of the Tamil Nadu Cricket Association (TNCA), Pudukottai Recreation Club (PRC) and Kodaikanal Boat and Rowing Club. He is a recipient of the George V Silver Jubilee Medal (1935), George VI Coronation Medal (1937) and Indian Independence medal (1948).

The Raja also, allowed and patronised the practice of Sadirattam, performed by the devadiyar community in Temples to continue, in his protection in the princely state of Pudukkottai, which did not fall under the laws of the general British Raj.

R Muthukannammal a former devadiyar, was one of the last known temple dancers, practiced during Rajagopala Tondaiman's rule, and was one of his protégées .
