= Madras States Agency =

1923 colonial agency in British India

Coordinates: 8°29′N 76°57′E

- Agency of British India
- 1923–1948
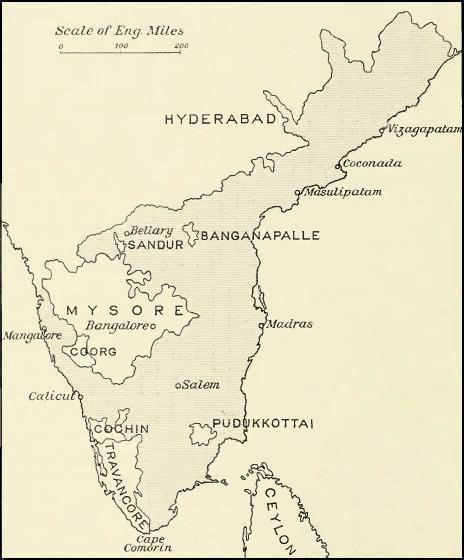
- 1913 map of the Madras Presidency including the Princely States.
- History
  - Establishment of the agency: 1923
  - Accession to the Indian Union: 1948
Preceded by	Succeeded by
Agencies of British India	India

The Madras States Agency was a colonial agency for the indirect rule of princely states associated with British India. Founded in 1923, it consisted of these five princely states (by precedence) :

- Travancore, ruled by a Maharaja with a hereditary salute of 19-guns;
- Cochin, ruled by a Maharaja with a hereditary salute of 17-guns;
- Pudukkottai, ruled by a Raja with a hereditary salute of 11-guns;
- Banganapalle, ruled by a Nawab with a hereditary salute of 9-guns;
- Sandur, a non-salute state ruled by a Raja.

== History ==
Prior to 1923, the five states have been subject to the government of the Madras Presidency which was represented in each state by a resident usually the District Collector of a neighbouring Madras district. When in 1923, all the states were brought under the direct control of the Government of India, the individual residencies were abolished and replaced with a single unitary agency responsible to the Governor-General of India.

The agent was based in Trivandrum, the capital of Travancore. He supervised the foreign relations of the princely states and their relationship with the Central government in New Delhi.

The agency was abolished when India became independent in 1947. Between 1947 and 1950, the Madras states with the exception of Travancore and Cochin were merged with the neighbouring districts of Madras Province.

== Chief officers ==
=== Agents ===
#	Name	Took office	Left office	Term
1	C. W. E. Cotton	26 June 1923	4 May 1926	1
2	H. A. B. Vernon (acting)	4 May 1926	11 November 1926	1
3	C. W. E. Cotton	9 November 1926	18 April 1928	2
4	C. G. Croswaithe	19 April 1928	4 December 1929	1
5	A. N. L. Cater	4 December 1929	20 October 1930	1
6	H. R. N. Pritchard	20 October 1930	21 November 1932	1
7	Donald Muyle Field	21 November 1932	22 February 1935	1
8	W. A. M. Garstin	22 February 1935	19 November 1936	1
9	Clairmont Percival Skrine	19 November 1936	1 April 1937	1

=== Residents ===
On 1 April 1937, the Madras States Agency was converted into a residency and on 1 January 1939, the princely states of Banganapalle and Sandur were transferred to the Mysore Residency.
