= Martanda Bhairava Tondaiman =

Raja of Pudukkottai from 1886 to 1928

- Martanda Bhairava Tondaiman in 1921

Raja of Pudukkottai
- Reign: 15 April 1886 – 28 May 1928
- Coronation: 15 April 1886
- Predecessor: Ramachandra Tondaiman
- Successor: Rajagopala Tondaiman
- Diwans: A. Seshayya Sastri, S. Venkataramadas Nayudu, Raghunatha Pallavarayar
- Born: 26 November 1875; Pudukkottai, Kingdom of Pudukkottai
- Died: 28 May 1928 (aged 52); Cannes, France
- Burial: Golders Green Crematorium
- Consort: Molly Fink (m. 1915 - 1928; his death)
- Issue: Prince Martanda Sydney Tondaiman
- House: Pudukkottai, kallar
- Mother: Princess Brihadambal Rajammani of Pudukkottai

Raja Sri Brahdamba Dasa Raja Sir Martanda Bhairava Tondaiman GCIE (26 November 1875 – 28 May 1928) was the ruler of the princely state of Pudukkottai from 15 April 1886 to 28 May 1928.

== Early life ==
Martanda Bhairava Tondaiman was born on 26 November 1875 to Princess Brihadambal Rajammani Sahib of Pudukkottai and her husband M.R.Ry. Kolandaswami Pallavarayar Sahib. Princess Brihadambal was the eldest daughter of Ramachandra Tondaiman, the Raja of Pudukkottai. Martanda was Brihadambal's third son. At an early age, Martanda was adopted by Ramachandra Tondaiman as he did not have any male heirs of his own.

Martanda was educated in private by Fredric Feilden Crossley, a Cambridge alumnus. Martanda excelled in sports and developed a liking for European culture and manners.

== Reign ==
Ramachandra Tondaiman, the Raja of Pudukkottai kingdom, died on 15 April 1886 after a reign of fifty years. Martanda Bhairava Tondaiman was, therefore, crowned king at the age of eleven with a regency headed by the Diwan, A. Seshayya Sastri governing the state in his minority.

Martanda assumed the reins of the government on 27 November 1894 when he attained majority and was invested with full powers by Lord Wenlock, the Governor of Madras, himself. Soon after obtaining the management of the state, Martanda petitioned for the restitution of the Manovarti jagir. The Manovarti jagir consisted of four villages which had been designated by Vijaya Raghunatha Tondaiman in the early 19th century as the private property of his three wives. Since Martanda was unmarried and did not have wives of his own at the time, he desired that the jagir be restored to him. However, the government rejected his request.

During his reign, Martanda attended the Coronation Durbar at Delhi in 1903 and the Coronation of George V at Westminster Abbey in 1911. In 1902, Martanda set up a representative assembly of 30 members on the pattern of the Mysore Assembly. The members of the assembly were nominated by heads of government departments and public institutions. The office of Councillor was created to assist the Diwan and the Diwan acting with the assistance of the Councillor was known as "Diwan-in-Council".

Martanda was made a Knight Grand Commander of the Order of the Indian Empire in the 1913 New Year Honours' List.

== Marriage and later life ==
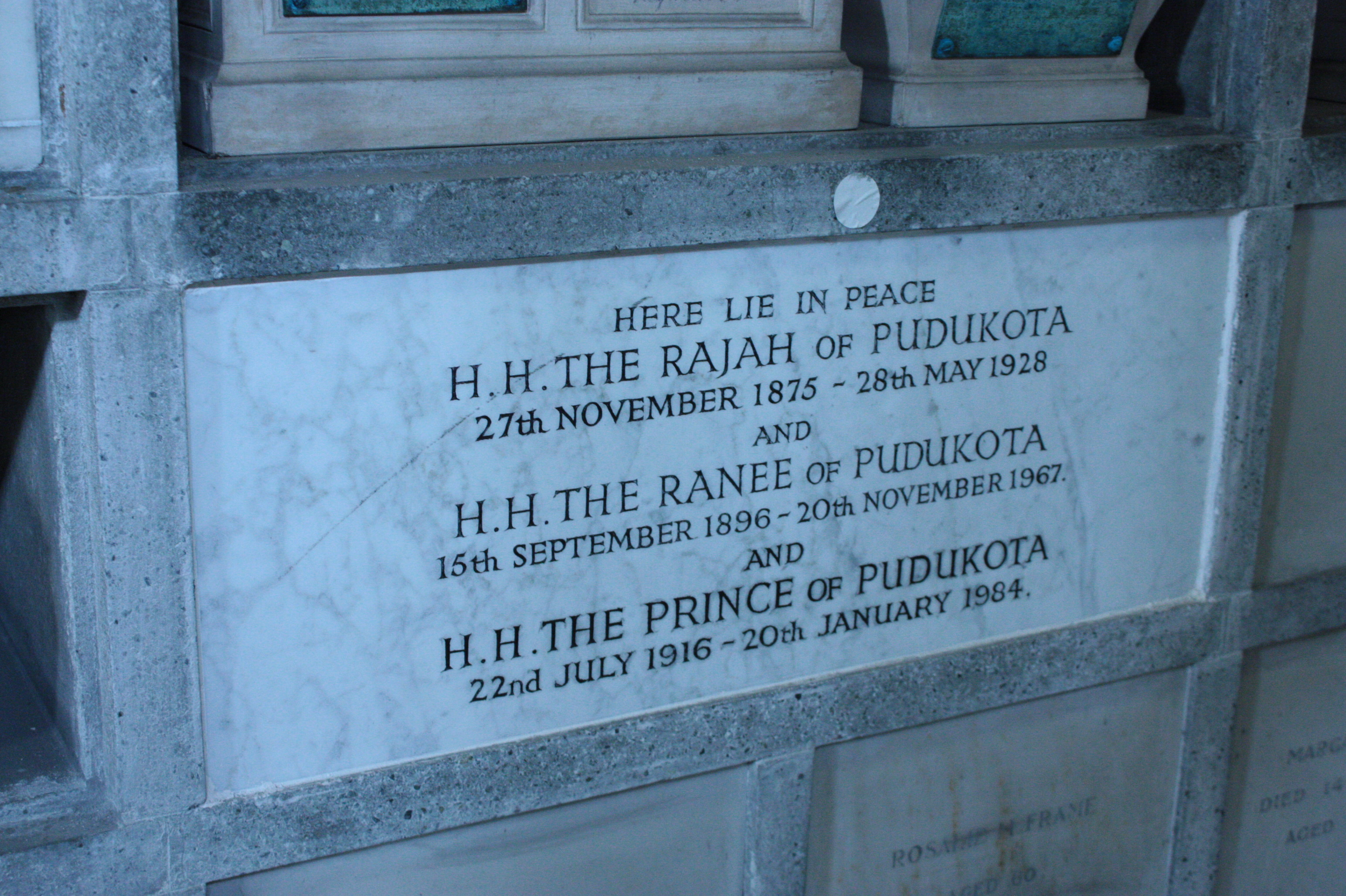
The grave of the Rajah of Pudukota, Golders Green Crematorium, London

In March 1915, Martanda travelled to Australia where he met Australian socialite Molly Fink at Hotel Majestic Mansions in Melbourne. Martanda soon fell in love with her and followed her to Sydney. In August 1915, Martanda proposed to Molly and she accepted. The couple were married on 10 August 1915 at the Regsitrar's Office in Melbourne. A son Martanda Sydney Tondaiman was born to them on 22 July 1916. Martanda had been briefly engaged to an American woman prior to his marriage with Molly.

Right from the beginning, the British authorities in India were hostile to their marriage. They refused to recognise Molly Fink as Martanda's wife and accord her the privileges due to a "Maharani". Martanda returned to India in October 1915 with Molly but barely stayed for five months. The couple moved to Australia where they stayed from 1916 to 1919 and then to London and eventually, Cannes, where they purchased a villa, La Favourite. In 1921, Martanda formally gave up his claim to the throne of Pudukkottai and nominated his brother Raghunatha Pallavarayar to rule the state in his absence. Martanda settled down in France with Molly and Sydney.

He died on 28 May 1928 at the age of fifty-two. His body was cremated and the ashes were interred in the Columbarium at the Golders Green Crematorium in London as the India Office refused Molly's request to transport his body by air to India.

Martanda Bhairava Tondaiman was succeeded as the Raja of Pudukkottai by his nephew, 6-year old Rajagopala Tondaiman, with Raghunatha Pallavarayar continuing as regent.
