= Pudukkottai Kingdom =

Monarchy in India (1680–1948)

Kingdom of Pudukkottai
- 1680–1948
- Flag Coat of arms

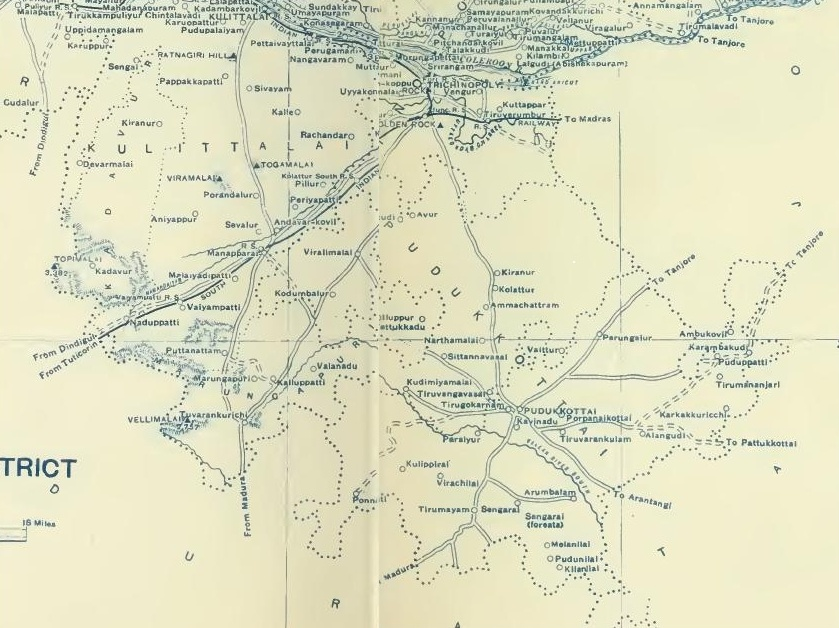
- Map of Pudukkottai
- Status: Independent Kingdom till 1801, Princely state of the British Raj (1801–1947)
- Capital: Pudukkottai
- Common languages: Tamil, English
- Religion: Hinduism, Islam
- Government: Absolute Monarchy
- Raja
  - 1686–1730: Raghunatha Raya Tondaiman (first)
  - 1928–1948: Rajagopala Tondaiman (last)
- History
  - Established: 1680
  - Earliest records: 1680
  - Disestablished: 1 March 1948

Area
- 1941: 3,050 km^{2} (1,180 sq mi)

Population
  - 1941: 438,648
Preceded by	Succeeded by
Madurai Nayak dynasty; Ramnad estate	Pudukkottai district
- Today part of: Tamil Nadu, India

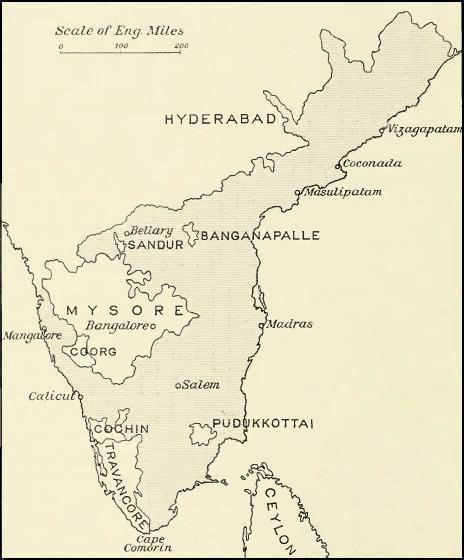
1913 map of the Madras Presidency showing location of Pudukkottai State

Pudukkottai was a kingdom and later a princely state in British India, which existed from 1680 until 1948.

The Kingdom of Pudukkottai was founded in about 1680 as a feudatory of Ramnad and grew with subsequent additions from Tanjore, Sivaganga and Ramnad. One of the staunch allies of the British East India Company in the Carnatic, Anglo-Mysore and Polygar wars, the kingdom was brought under the Company's protection in 1800 as per the system of Subsidiary Alliance. The state was placed under the control of the Madras Presidency from 1800 until 1 October 1923, when the Madras States Agency was created, and until 1948 it was under the political control of the Government of India.

Pudukkottai State covered a total area of 1,178 square miles (3,050 km^{2}) and had a population of 438,648 in 1941. It extended over the whole of the present-day Pudukkottai district of Tamil Nadu (with the exception of Aranthangi taluk which was then a part of Tanjore district). The town of Pudukkottai was its capital. The ruler of Pudukkottai was entitled to a 17-gun salute.

== Geography ==
The state of Pudukkottai extended from 10°7′ to 10°44′ north latitude and from 78°25′ to 79°12′ east longitude, and covered a total area of 1,178 square miles (3,050 km^{2}). It extended for 52 miles (84 km) from east to west and 41 miles (66 km) from north to south. The state was bounded by Trichinopoly district to the west, Tanjore district to the east and south-east and Sivaganga estate of Madura district to the south.

The kingdom did not have fixed boundaries originally and was called "Tondaiman country" or "Tondaiman's woods" until the end of 18th century. The kingdom started to have fixed boundaries since early 19th century. The easternmost point of Pudukkottai state was located 12 miles (19 km) from the sea. When the Pudukkottai district was formed in 1974 long after its incorporation into the Republic of India, the coastal Aranthangi taluk was detached from Tanjore district and merged with the new district.

For administrative purposes, the state was divided into three taluks: Alangudi, Kulathur and Thirumayam, each under the authority of a Tahsildar who was responsible for land revenue. There were also a few semi-autonomous zamindaris : Karambakadu, Nagaram, Palayavanam, Senthankudi and Seriyalur.

== Demography ==
Historical population
Year	Pop.	±%
1871	316,695	—
1881	302,127	−4.6%
1891	373,097	+23.5%
1901	380,440	+2.0%
1911	411,694	+8.2%
1921	426,813	+3.7%
1931	400,694	−6.1%
1941	438,648	+9.5%

As of 1931, the princely state of Pudukkottai had a total population of 400,694 with a population density of 340 people per square mile. Ponnamaravathi firka was the most densely populated with 498 people per square mile while Nirpalani was the most sparsely populated with 213 people per square mile. There were 435 towns and villages - 426 of them with a population less than 5,000 and nine - Pudukkottai, Ponnamaravathi, Varpet, Ramachandrapuram, Arimalam, Thirumayam, Alangudi, Keeranur and Pillamangalam-Alagapuri with population greater than 5,000. The male literacy rate was 21.62 percent and the female literacy rate, 1.87 percent. Between 1925 and 1929, the population of the state dropped by over 65 percent as more than 53,000 people left Pudukkottai for neighbouring districts due to widespread plague and famine.

=== Religion ===
The kingdom was predominantly Hindu. However, there were significant Muslim and Christian populations. The affairs of Hindu temples were administered by a Devasthanams Department established in 1897.

According to the 1901 census, there were 353,723 Hindus who formed 93% of the state's population. Muslims who numbered 12,268 formed 3.2% of the population while the Christians numbering 14,449 formed 3.8% of the population. In 1931, there were 367,348 Hindus (91.7 percent), 15,194 Muslims (3.8 percent) and 17,960 Christians (4.5 percent).

=== Languages ===
The majority of the population spoke Tamil as their mother tongue. According to the 1931 census, Tamil was spoken by 378,741 people or 94.52 percent of the population as their mother tongue. Other languages spoken as mother-tongue included Telugu (12,250 speakers, 3.05%), Kanarese (5,118, 1.27%), Saurashtri (1,172, 0.29%), Marathi (660, 0.16%), Malayalam (522, 0.13%), Hindi (187, 0.04%), Arabic (23, 0.005%), English (22, 0.005%), Danish (2, 0.0005%), Malay (1, 0.0003%), Sinhalese (1, 0.0003%), Konkani (1, 0.0003%) and Spanish (1, 0.0003%). The natives of Pudukkottai spoke Tamil which was also an official language of the state alongside English. Telugu-speakers were descendants of military chieftains who had migrated during the rule of the Vijayanagar Empire and the Madurai Nayak kingdom. Kanarese or Kannada was spoken largely by the Kuruba shepherds who had migrated from the Mysore kingdom. However, the Kurubars spoke a Kanarese dialect of their own with a heavy admixture of Tamil words. Hindusthani or Urdu was used by Pathani Muslims while Saurasthri and Marathi were spoken by the Saurashtra and Thanjavur Marathi migrants.

== Administration ==
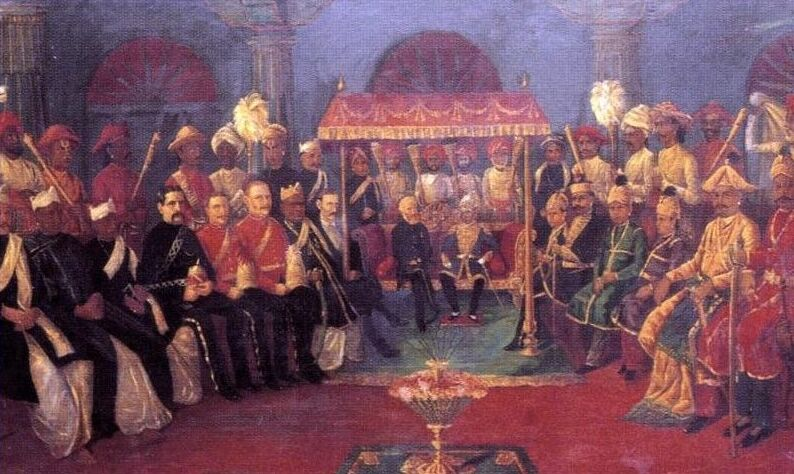
Puddukotai Durbar painted by Raja Ravi Varma

The Raja of Pudukkottai was the paramount head of the state and no bill became law without his assent. He was assisted by a Prime Minister designated as Sirkel till 1 July 1885 and Diwan from 1 July 1885 till 17 November 1931 and Administrator from 17 November 1931 till 1948. The Diwan was assisted by a Councillor and the Diwan acting with the assistance of the Councillor was known as the Diwan-in-Council.

A representative assembly of 30 nominated members was inaugurated in 1902 by Diwan Bahadur Siram Venkataramadas Nayudu. Elections were introduced in 1907 and from then on, 18 out of the 30 representatives were elected. The number of elected members was reduced to 13 in 1913 but was raised to 25 in 1916. The representative assembly was replaced by the Pudukkottai Legislative Council in 1924 and its first session was inaugurated by C. W. E. Cotton, the Governor's agent for the Madras states on 29 September 1924. At the time of the dissolution of the state in 1948, the assembly had a total of 50 members of whom 35 were elected and the rest, nominated by the government. However, as per the Pudukkottai Legislative Council Resolution of 1924, the creation of the council did not affect the right of the Raja to enact laws and issue proclamations on his own; nor did it allow its members to debate on the activities of the royal household.

The Government of Madras was represented by a political agent. From 1800, when the first Political agent was appointed, till 1840, the Political Agent was usually the District Collector of Tanjore, from 1840 to 1865, the Agent was the Collector of Madurai and from 1865 to 1947 the agent was the Collector of Trichinopoly. All the decisions made by the Diwan are passed to the Madras Government for approval before they become the law.

== Economy ==
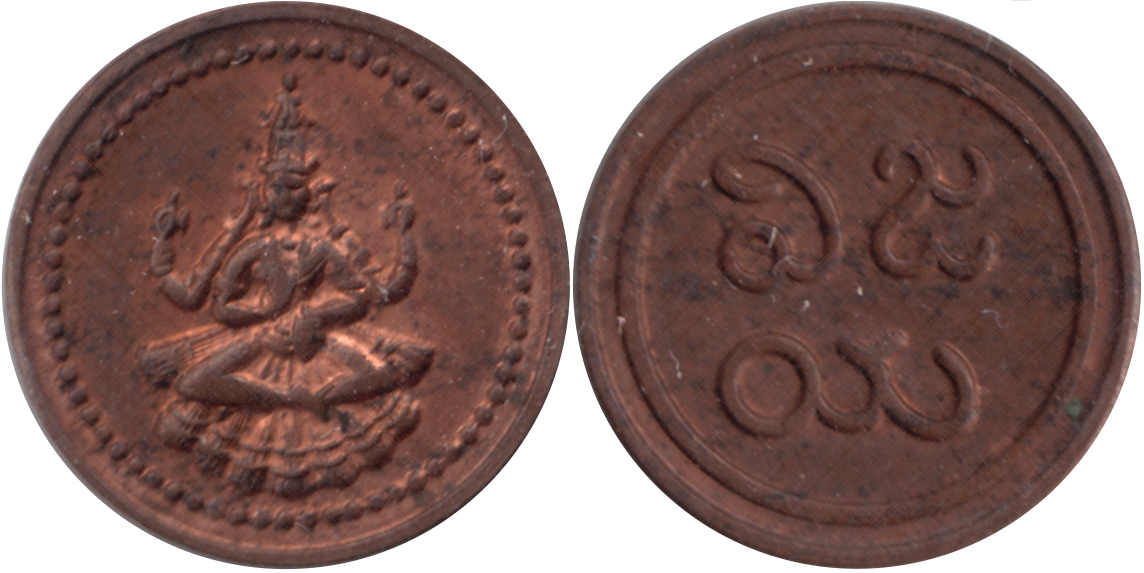
1 amman kasu coin (1889-1906) from Pudukkottai with Vijaya written in Telugu in the obverse

As of 1 April 1936, there were 27 companies registered in Pudukkottai state. Limited companies which were operating in Pudukkottai state included The Chettinad Corporation and Bank Ltd, M. C. T. M. Banking Corporation Ltd, The Pudukkottai Trading and Banking Corporation, the Hindu Karur Bank which had a branch in Pudukkottai town, Diwan Bahadur Subbiah Chettiar's Trading and Banking Company, Mena Chena Mena Mena Bank, Janopkara Motor Service Company which had a branch in Ponnamaravathi, The Sun Bank Ltd, The Modern Bank Ltd (Pillamangalam-Alagapuri), Pudukkottai branch of the Indo-Commercial Bank Ltd and the Pudukkottai branch of the Travancore National Bank Ltd. Registered companies which carried on industrial or trading businesses in Pudukkottai included The Pudukkottai Brick and Tile Manufactory, Sri Murugan Company, The Pudukkottai Trading and Banking Company, Sambandam & Co., Diwan Bahadur Subbiah Chettiar's Trading and Banking Company, T. V. Sundaram Aiyangar & Co. and South Indian Corporation Ltd.

== List of kings of Pudukkottai ==
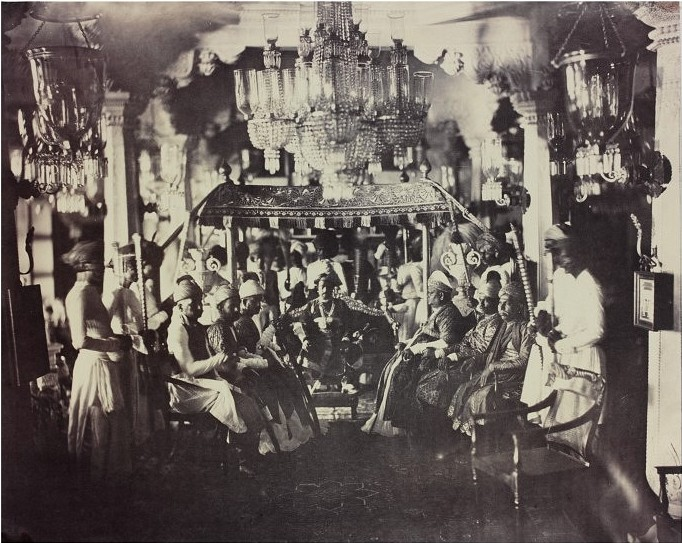
Ramachandra Tondaiman, king of Pudukkottai, at his durbar, ca. 1858

- Raghunatha Raya Tondaiman (1686–1730)
- Vijaya Raghunatha Raya Tondaiman I (1730–1769)
- Raya Raghunatha Tondaiman (1769– December 1789)
- Vijaya Raghunatha Tondaiman (December 1789 – 1 February 1807)
- Vijaya Raghunatha Raya Tondaiman II (1 February 1807 – June 1825)
- Raghunatha Tondaiman (June 1825 – 13 July 1839)
- Ramachandra Tondaiman (13 July 1839 – 15 April 1886)
- Martanda Bhairava Tondaiman (15 April 1886 – 28 May 1928)
- Rajagopala Tondaiman (28 October 1928 – 1 March 1948)

== List of Diwans of Pudukkottai ==
- A. Seshayya Sastri (1878–1894)
- R. Vedantacharlu (1894–1899)
- S. Venkataramadas Nayudu (1899–1909)
- Raghunatha Pallavarayar (1909–1924)
- K. Kunjunni Menon (1924–1929)
- G. Ganapati Sastriar (1929–1931)
- G. Krishnaswamy Iyer (1931-1934)
- Alexander Tottenham (1934-1941)
- P. Kalifullah Rowther Sahib (1941-1947)

== President of the Council of Administration ==
- T. Raghavaiah (1929–1931)

== Administrators ==
- B. G. Holdsworth (1931–1934)
- Alexander Tottenham (1934–1946)
- P. Khalifulla Rowther Sahib (1946–1948)

== Family tree ==
Family tree of the Rajas of Pudukkottai

Raghunatha; Raya; Tondaiman I^{(1)} r. 1686-1730
Thirumalai; Raya; Tondaiman
Vijaya; Raghunatha; Raya; Tondaiman I^{(2)} r. 1730-1769	Thirumalai; Raya; Tondaiman
Raya; Raghunatha; Tondaiman^{(3)} r. 1769-1789	Vijaya; Raghunatha; Tondaiman^{(4)} r. 1789-1807
Vijaya; Raghunatha; Raya; Tondaiman II^{(5)} r. 1807-1825	Raghunatha; Tondaiman II^{(6)} r. 1825-1839
Ramachandra; Tondaiman^{(7)} r. 1839-1886
Kolandaswami; Pallavarayar	Brihadambal; Rajammani
Martanda; Bhairava; Tondaiman^{(8)} r. 1886-1928	Ramachandra; Tondaiman
Rajagopala; Tondaiman^{(9)} r. 1928-1948
