= Pudukkottai =

City in Tamil Nadu, India

- City
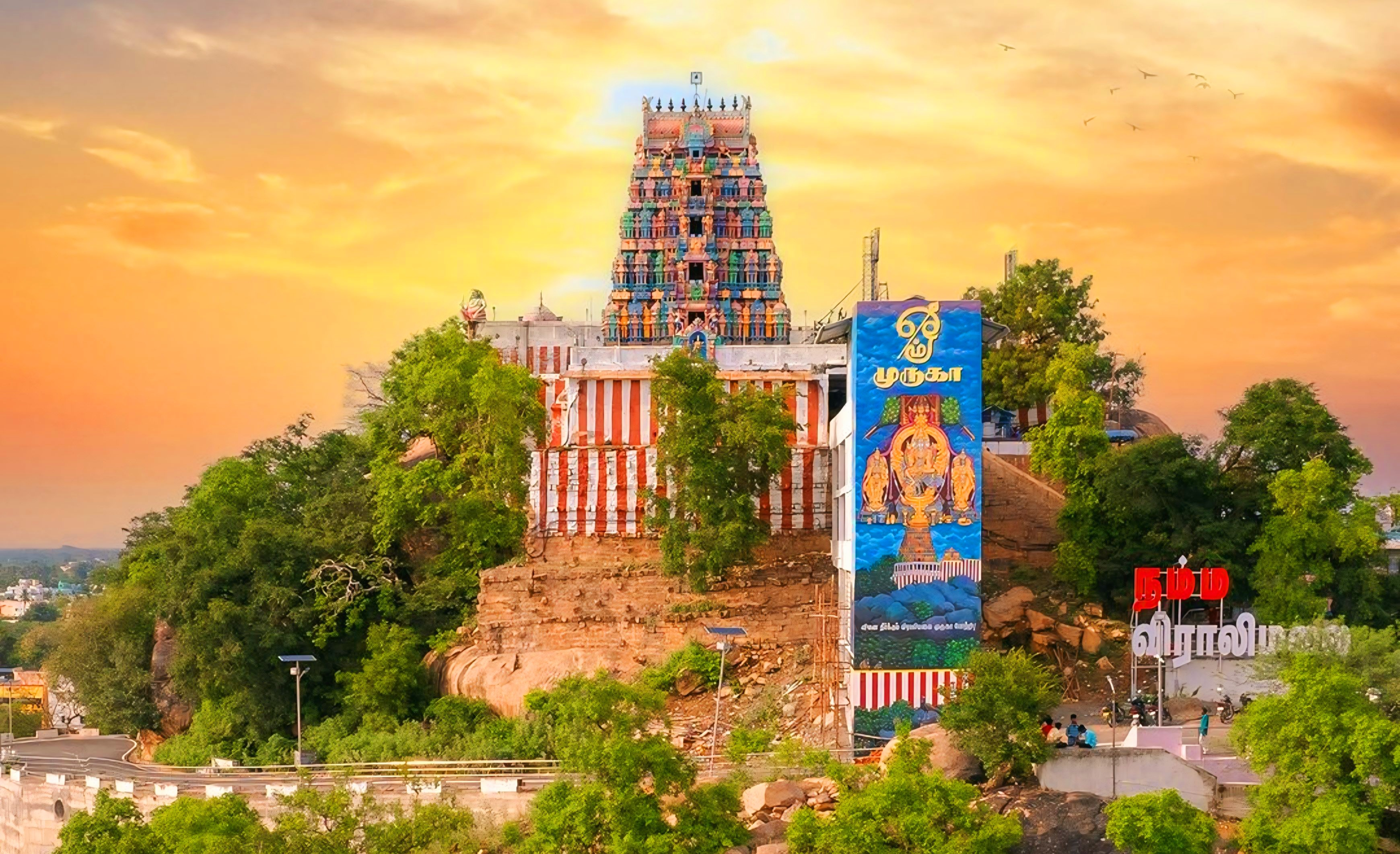
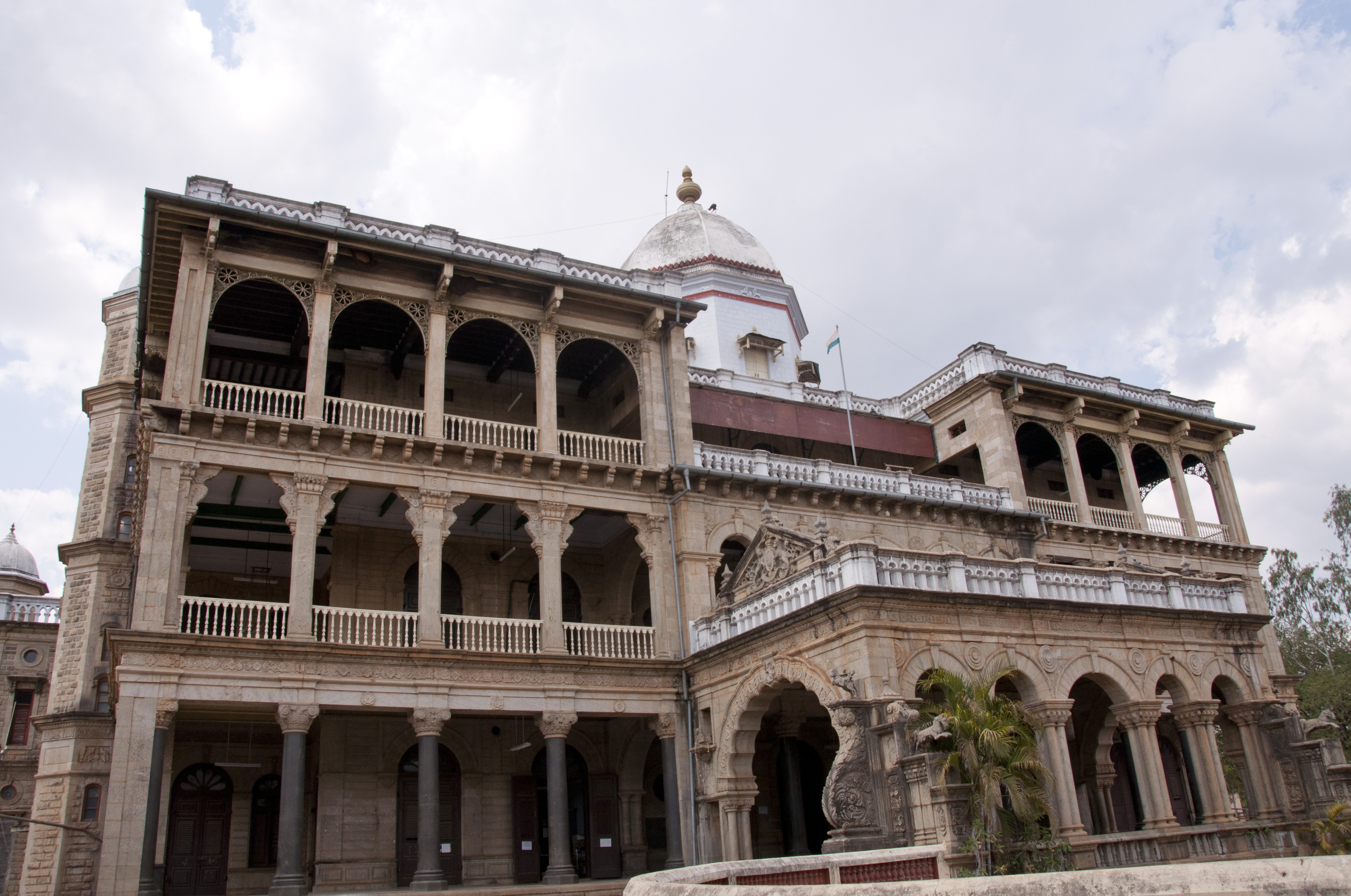
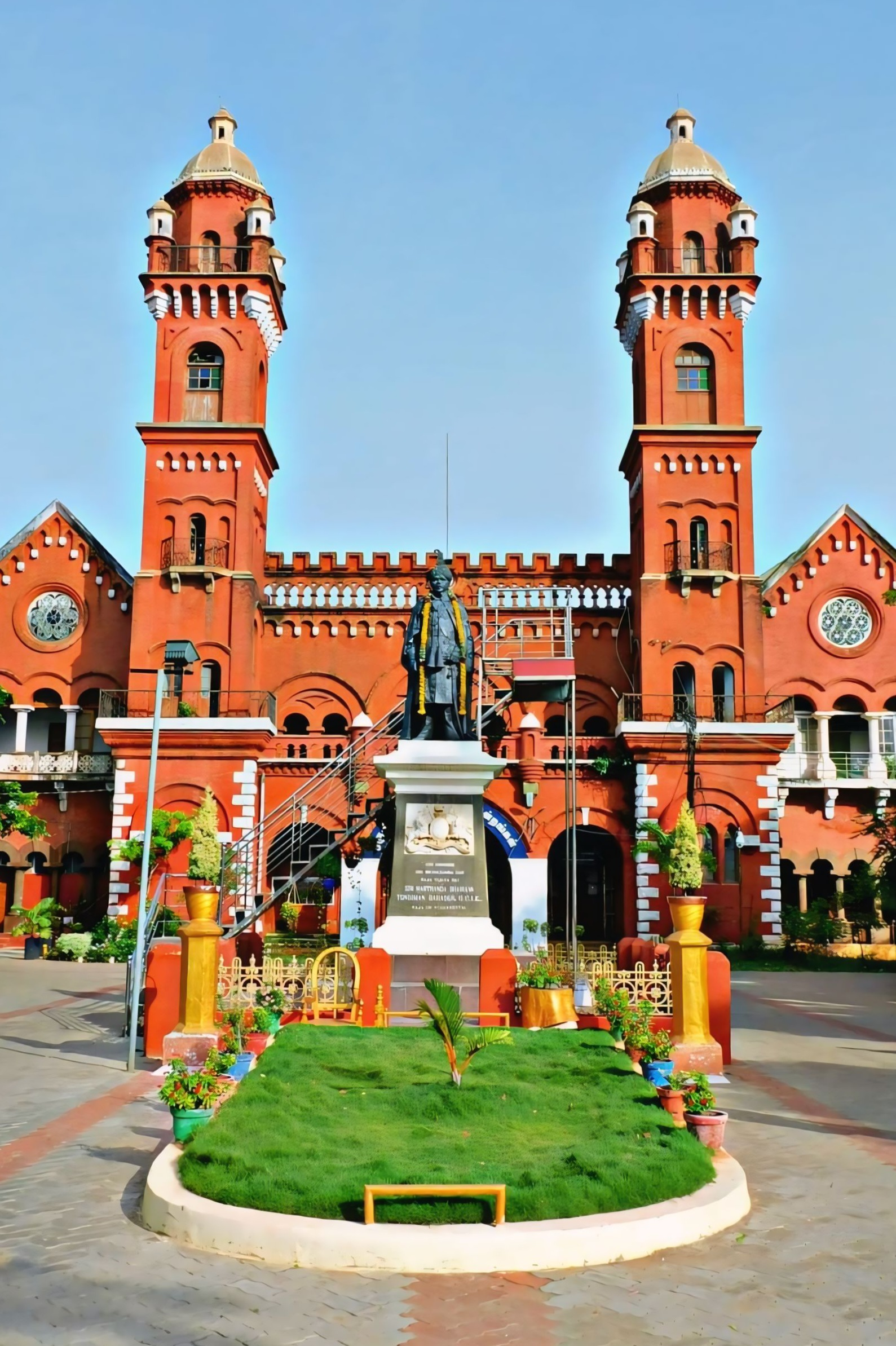
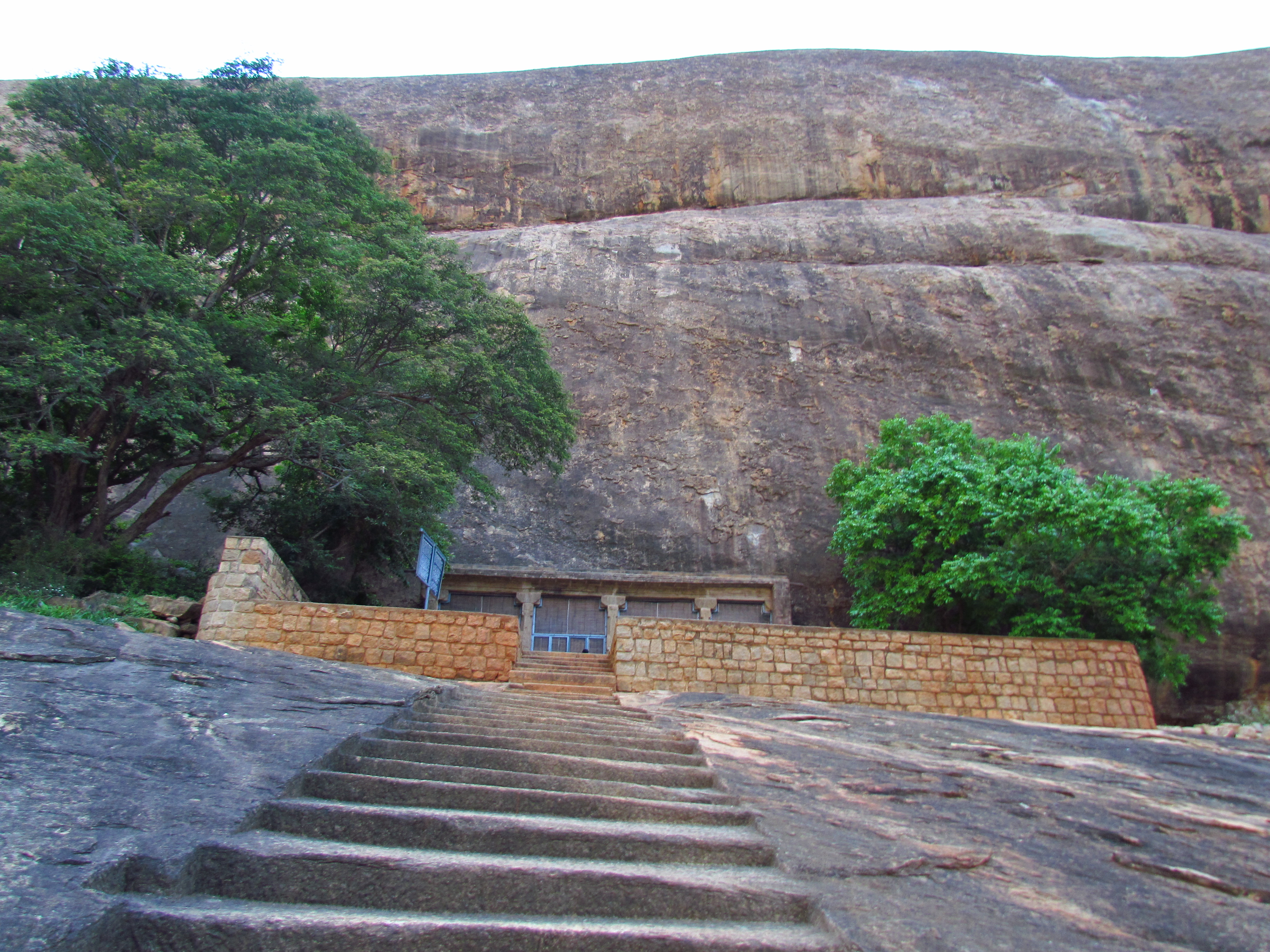
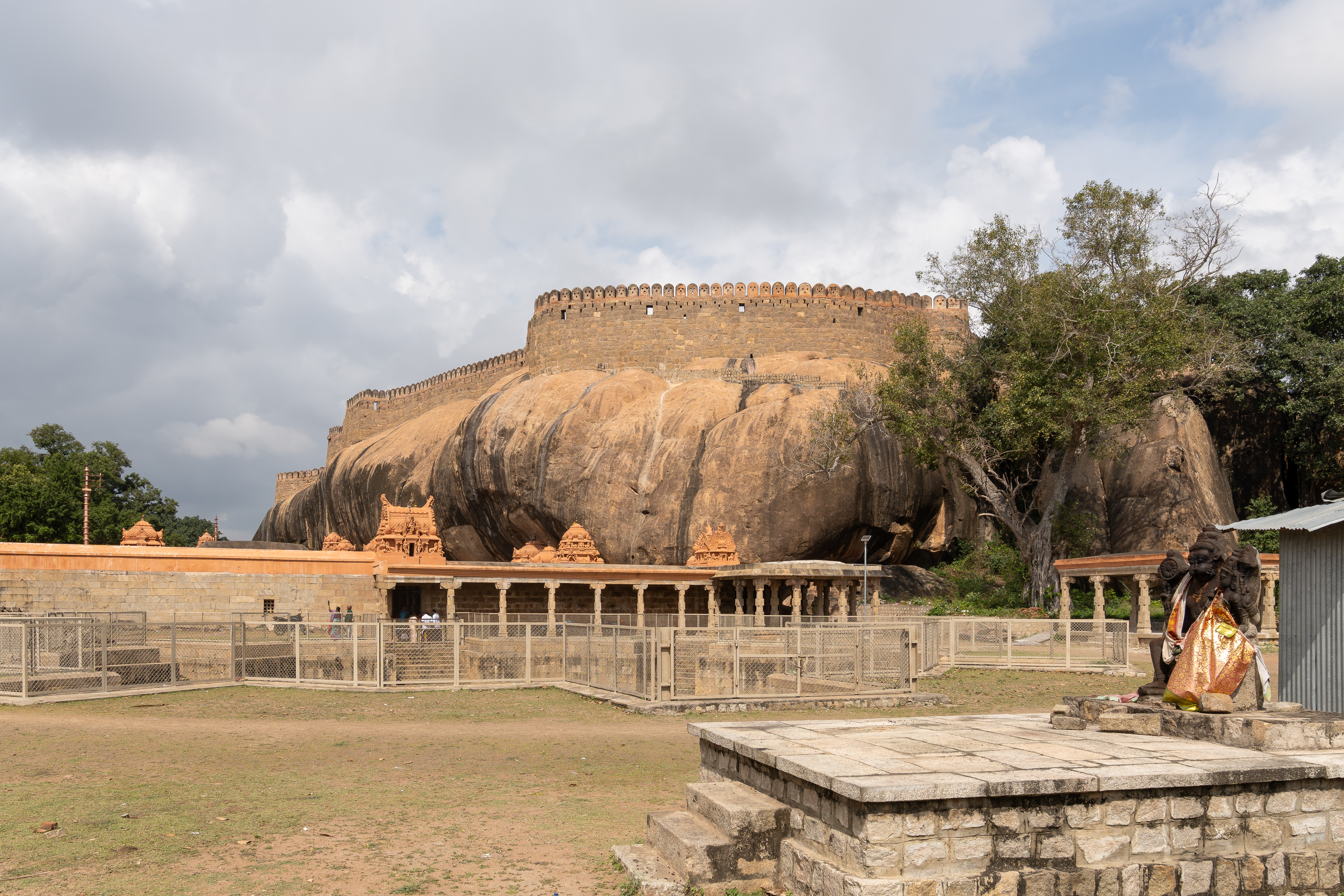
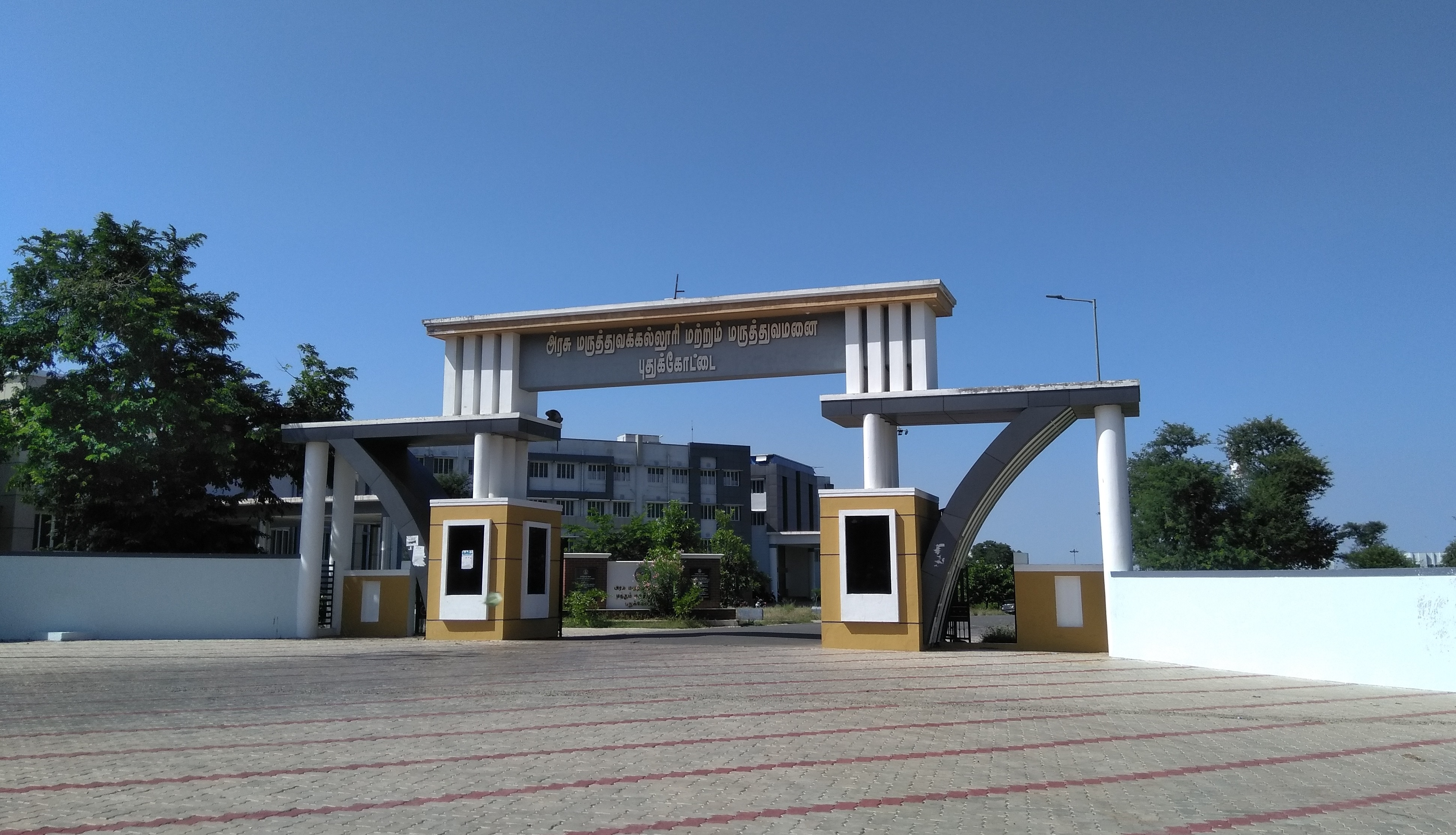
- Viralimalai Murugan temple Pudukkottai palace District court Sittanavasal Cave Thirumayam Fort Government Pudukkottai Medical College and Hospital
- Nicknames: Thondaiman Pudukkottai , Princely State
- Location in Tamil Nadu, India
- Coordinates: 10.383300°N 78.800100°E
- Country: India
- State: Tamil Nadu
- District: Pudukkottai
- Collector: M. Aruna, IAS
- Superintendent of Police: Rabindra Kumar Gupta, IPS
- Established: 1912
- Founder: Raghunatha Raya Tondaiman
- Named for: New fort built by Raghunatha Raya Tondaiman

Government
  - Type: Municipal corporation
  - Body: Pudukkottai Municipal Corporation
  - Mayor: S. Thilagavathi Senthil (2022-Present)
  - Deputy Mayor: M. Liyakath Ali (2022–Present)
  - Municipal Commissioner: D. Narayanan (2024–Present)

Area
  - Total: 121.26 km^{2} (46.82 sq mi)
- Elevation: 116 m (381 ft)

Population (2024)
  - Total: 225,500
  - Density: 1,860/km^{2} (4,816/sq mi)
- Demonym: Pudukkottaikaran

Languages
  - Official: Tamil
- Time zone: UTC+5:30 (IST)
- PIN: 622001–622006
- Telephone code: 04322
- Vehicle registration: TN-55
- Sex ratio: 995 per 1,000 males ♂/♀
- Website: pudukkottai.nic.in

Pudukkottai is a City and the administrative headquarters of Pudukkottai district in the Indian state of Tamil Nadu. It is one of the oldest heritage cities located on the banks of the Vellar River. It has been ruled, at different times, by the Mutharaiyar dynasty, Cholas, Early Pandyas, and Thondaimans. It is situated about 372 kilometres (231 mi) southwest of the state capital Chennai, 50 kilometres (31 mi) southeast of Tiruchirappalli, and 108 kilometres (67 mi) northeast of Madurai.

Pudukkottai is sometimes called a cradle of archaeology. Being the district headquarters, Pudukkottai has district administrative offices, along with government educational institutes, colleges, and schools. Pudukkottai is a part of the Pudukkottai constituency and elects its member to the legislative assembly every five years. It is a part of the Lok Sabha constituency comprising Ramanathapuram, Sivaganga, Tiruchirappalli and Karur. Pudukkottai is administered by a selection-grade municipality established in 1912 as per the Municipal Corporation Act. Pudukkottai covers an area of 21.25 km^{2} (8.20 sq mi) and had a population of 117,745 in 2011. Roadways are the major mode of transport to the city, along with rail connectivity. The nearest airport is Tiruchirappalli International Airport, located at a distance of 45 km (28 miles) from the city.

It is one of the few towns and cities in the List of AMRUT Smart cities in Tamil Nadu selected by the central government. Its developmental activities are taken care of by government of Tamil Nadu. On 15 March 2024, the Government of Tamil Nadu announced that the city along with the surrounding merged panchayats will be upgraded from municipality to corporation status (Tamil: மாநகராட்சி).

== History ==
Pudukkottai was a kingdom and later a princely state in British India, existing from 1680 until 1948.

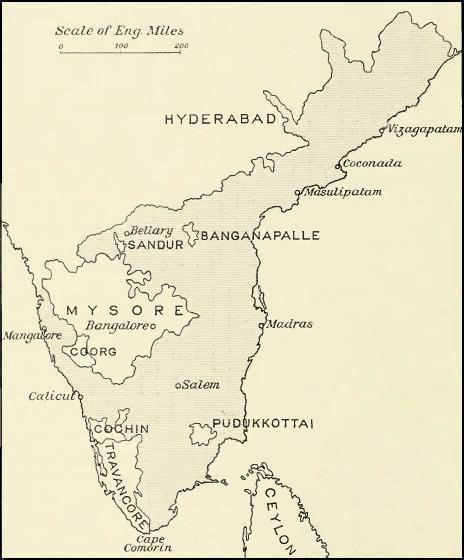
1913 map of the Madras Presidency showing location of Pudukkottai State

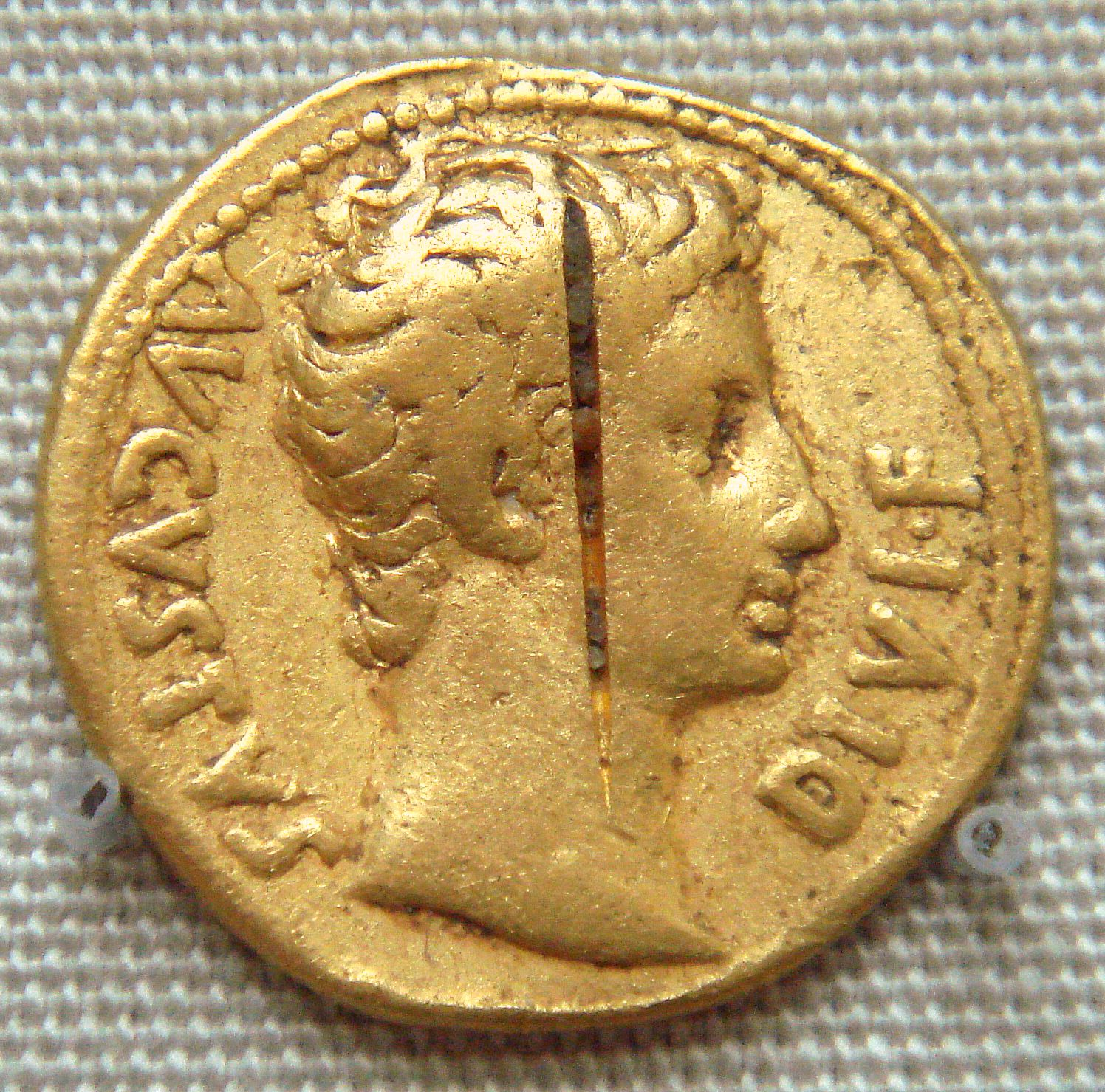
Coin of the Roman emperor Augustus from the Pudukottai hoard (British Museum).

The princely state of Pudukottai was created by Raghunatha Raya Tondaiman (1641–1730), who earlier had ruled Thirumayam. In appreciation of Tondaiman's services, Ragunatha Kilavan Setupati (r. 1671–1710) gave Pudukkottai to Tondaiman as an honor for his services. In later centuries, the Thondaiman rulers, while nominally feudatories of the Ramnad state, often pursued an independent foreign policy, a trend common in all parts of India at that time. After the death of Setupati, Thondaiman become ruler of Pudukottai.

Thondaiman soon fought against the Nayaks of Thanjavur in support of the Nayaks of Madurai and conquered Thirukattupalli, a very important place. A direct clash between Thondaiman and the Nayaks of Tanjore soon followed. From 1751-1752, The next ruler, Vijaya Raghunatha Raya Tondaiman (1713-1769), helped the Muslim Nawab of the Carnatic Sultanate against Hyder Ali, the ruler of Mysore, who was loyal to the British Government. After some time, when Hyder Ali's army tried to enter Pudukkottai, Thondaiman's army defeated and drove Hyder's army away. Thondaiman then captured Kilanilai, Aranthangi and helped the British government against Tipu Sultan.

Pudukkotai eventually came under formal British protection. This was arguably unavoidable since the Thondaimans were much menaced in that period by a resurgent Mysore ruled by Hyder Ali and Tipu Sultan. When Tipu Sultan sought to leverage the power of the French against his British adversaries, Pudukkotai, in common with its neighbors, such as Thanjavur and Travancore, found it expedient to ally with the British.

Raja Rajagopala Thondaiman (1928–1948), the last and ninth in the line of Thondaiman rulers, was selected by the British Government and was crowned when he was six years old. After Indian independence in 1947, the Pudukkottai Princely State was amalgamated with the Indian Union on 3 April 1948 and became a division in Tiruchirappalli District. The long history of the Thondaimans' rule came to an end.

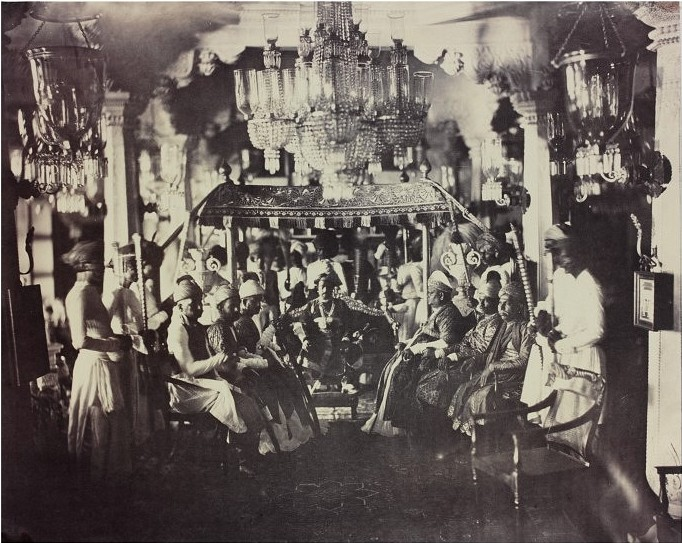
Thondaiman King in his Durbar, Pudukkottai, 1858.

Revenue stamp issued by the princely state of Pudukkottai with a portrait of Martanda Bhairava Tondaiman

Some of the major kings of the dynasty are Tondaiman (1686–1730), Vijaya Raghunatha Raya Tondaiman,(1730–1769), Raya Raghunatha Tondaiman (1769 – Dec 1789), Vijaya Raghunatha Tondaiman (Dec 1789 – 1 February 1807), Vijaya Raghunatha Raya Tondaiman (1 February 1807 – June 1825), Raghunatha Tondaiman (June 1825 – 13 July 1839), Ramachandra Tondaiman (13 July 1839 – 15 April 1886), Marthanda Bhairava Tondaiman (15 April 1886 – 28 May 1928) and Rajagopala Tondaiman (28 October 1928 – 4 March 1948).

Pudukkottai became a princely state of British India under the political authority of Madras Presidency. The state had an area of 4663 Sq.miles and in 1901, a population of 380,000. The Rajas of Pudukkotai were entitled to a 17-gun salute. The last Thondaiman raja of Pudukkottai acceded to newly-independent India in 1948, and the state became a division of the Trichinopoly District of Madras State. The state was reorganized twice in the succeeding decade, taking its present form in 1956; it was renamed Tamil Nadu in 1968. On 14 January 1974, the present Pudukkottai District was formed from parts of Tiruchirappalli and Thanjavur districts.

== Geography ==
Pudukkottai City is located at 10.38°N 78.82°E in the valley of the Vellar River. The city has a semi-arid climate with high temperatures throughout the year and relatively low rainfall. Pudukkottai has a plain terrain with a few rocky hills in the outskirts. Urugumalai, Athimalai, Chennaimalai are the hills that surround the city. The rivers that flow in Pudukkottai are Amaravathy, Noyal, Bhavani, and Kaveri. There are no notable mineral resources available in and around the district. Red loam and red sand are the types of soil found in the town. Paddy, groundnuts, bananas and sugarcane are the major crops in the region. Pudukkottai experiences hot and dry weather throughout the year. The temperature ranges from a maximum of 39.7 °C (103.5 °F) to a minimum of 17.8 °C (64.0 °F). Like the rest of the state, April to June are the hottest months, and December to January are the coldest. Pudukkottai receives an average rainfall of 978.8 mm (38.54 in). The Southwest monsoon, starting in June and lasting up to August, brings scanty rainfall. A bulk of the rainfall is received during the North-East monsoon in the months of October, November and December. The municipality covers an area of 21.25 km^{2} (21,250,000 m^{2}).

== Demographics ==
Religious census
Religion	Percent(%)
Hindu	88.28%
Muslim	5.86%
Christian	6.13%
Sikh	0.02%
Other	0.26%
No religion	0.26%

Historical population
Year	Pop.	±%
1961	50,428	—
1971	66,384	+31.6%
1981	87,952	+32.5%
1991	99,058	+12.6%
2001	109,217	+10.3%
2011	117,745	+7.8%
Sources: 1901 – 2001; 2011

According to 2011 census, Pudukkottai had a population of 117745 with a sex-ratio of 1,003 females for every 1,000 males. A total of 960 were under the age of six. The town enjoys a high literacy rate of 91.35% as of 2011 census. As of 2001, 20 slums were identified in the town and approximately 37,740 people resided in the slums. The population of the town decreased during the 1991–2001 period is attributed to the migration to other cities in search of employment and lesser job opportunities in the town. The city covers an area of 21.25 square kilometres (8.20 sq mi).

As per the religious census of 2011, Hinduism is the majority religion in Pudukkottai city with 79.40% followers. Islam is the second most popular religion in the city of Pudukkottai with approximately 15.14% following it. In Pudukkottai city, Christianity is followed by 4.89%, Jainism by 0.00%, Sikhism by 0.02%, and Buddhism by 0.02%. Around 0.04% stated 'Other Religion', approximately 0.50% stated 'No Particular Religion'.

The Thondaiman king, Vijaya Raghunatha rebuilt the town based on the principles of town planning so that the main streets were laid intersecting at right angles with the palace at the center. Out of the total area, 80.85% of the land is marked developed and 19.15% of the city remains undeveloped. Residential areas makeup 60.1% of the town's total area while commercial enterprises and industrial units make up 4.43% and 1.47% respectively. The population density is not uniform throughout the town. It is high in the center and lowers in peripheral areas such as Sivagandapuram, Ganesh Nagar, and the Tamil Nadu Housing Area. The density ranges from 200 to 300 persons per hectare in the central part of the town and 16 – 55 persons per hectare (PPH) in the peripheral areas with low-density Hindus form the majority of the urban population, followed by Muslims and Christians. Tamil is the main language spoken in the city, but the use of English is relatively common; English is the medium of instruction in most educational institutions and offices in the service sector.

== Municipal administration and politics ==
City Corporation Officials
Mayor	Mrs. Thilagavathi Senthil
Corporation Commissioner	Mr. Narayanan
Deputy Meyor	Mr. Liyakath Ali
Elected members
Member of Legislative Assembly	Mr. Muthuraja
Member of Parliament	Mr. Durai Vaiko

Pudukottai Municipal Corporation is the headquarters of the Pudukkottai district. The city was constituted as a third-grade municipality in 1912, promoted to first-grade during 1963 and selection-grade from 1998. The Pudukkottai municipality has 42 wards and there is an elected councillor for each of those wards. The functions of the municipality are devolved into six departments: general administration/personnel, Engineering, Revenue, Public Health, city planning and Information Technology (IT). All these departments are under the control of a Municipal Commissioner who is the executive head. The legislative powers are vested in a body of 42 members, one each from the 42 wards. The legislative body is headed by an elected chairperson assisted by a deputy chairperson.

Pudukkottai is a part of the Pudukottai and it elects a member to the Tamil Nadu Legislative Assembly once every five years. From the 1977 elections, All India Anna Dravid Munnetra Kazhagam (AIADMK) won the assembly seat three times (in 2001 and 2006 elections), five times by Dravida Munnetra Kazhagam (DMK, 1989, 1996, 2016, 2021 and 2026), four times by Indian National Congress (INC) (1977, 1984 and 1991 elections). The current MLA of Pudukottai constituency is Dr.Muthuraja from DMK party.

Pudukottai is a part of the Pudukkottai (Lok Sabha constituency) till the 2004 elections before delimitation in 2009 – it had the following six assembly constituencies – Peravurani, Pudukkottai, Alangudi and Arantangi state assembly constituencies. From the 2009 elections, the town is part of Tiruchirappalli constituency and the current Member of Parliament is Su. Thirunavukkarasar from the Indian National Congress. From 1951, the erstwhile Pudukottai parliament seat was held by the Indian National Congress for six times (during 1957, 1980, 1984, 1989, 1991 and 1999 elections), Dravid Munnetra Kazhagam three times (during the 1971, 1996 and 2004 elections) and once each by KMPP (during 1951 elections), CPI (during 1962 elections), CPM (during 1967 elections) and AIADMK (during 1998 elections). The current Member of Parliament from the constituency is Su. Thirunavukkarasar from Indian National Congress.

Law and order in the city are maintained by the Pudukottai subdivision of the Tamil Nadu Police headed by a Deputy Superintendent. There are four police stations in the town, with one of them being an all-women police station. There are special units like prohibition enforcement, district crime, social justice, and human rights, district crime records and the special branch that operate at the district level police division headed by a Superintendent of Police.

== Transportation ==
The Pudukottai Municipal Corporation maintains 122.84 km (76.33 mi) of roads. The city has 4.16 km (2.58 mi) concrete roads, 9.78 km (6.08 mi) WBM roads, 6 km (3.7 mi) gravel roads, 2.5 km (1.6 mi) footpaths and 100.4 km (62.4 mi) bituminous road. A total of 19.908 km (12.370 mi) of state highways is maintained by the State Highways Department and national highways by the National Highways Department.

There are two national highways namely the NH 336 Trichy – Ramanathapuram road and NH 36 Vikravandi – Manamadurai road that pass via Pudukkottai. There are two state highways that pass via the town – SH 26 Trichy – Mimisal road and SH 71 Musiri – Sethubavachatram road. The other major district roads connect Pudukkottai to other parts of the district. The Pudukkottai bus stand is a A-grade bus stand located in the centre of the town. The State Express Transport Corporation operates long-distance buses connecting the city to important cities like Chennai and Bengaluru. TNSTC Kumbakonam division operates frequent intercity and intrastate buses to cities like Kumbakonam, Tiruchchirapalli, Thanjavur, Madurai, Coimbatore, Aranthangi, Karaikudi, Devakottai, Sivagangai, Pattukkottai, Ponnamaravathi, Rameswaram, Kodaikanal, Dindigul, Theni, Tiruppur, Karur, Palani, Salem, Erode, Mettupalayam, Nagapattinam, Velankanni, Villupuram, Vellore, Tiruvannamalai, Nagercoil, Tiruchendur and Thoothukudi. KSRTC operates daily buses between Bengaluru and Pudukkottai.

Pudukkottai railway station has daily express trains to and from Chennai, Rameswaram and weekly express trains to Coimbatore, Puducherry, Kanyakumari, Varanasi and Bhubaneshwar. The town has passenger train services to Trichy, Manamadurai, Rameswaram and Karaikudi.

The nearest local and international airport is the Tiruchirapalli International Airport, located 45 km from the town.

== Places of interest ==
- Sittanavasal Cave
- Government Museum, the second largest museum in Tamil Nadu
- Thirumayam Fort
- Pudukottai Palace – A grand palace in Pudukkottai featuring a sand casket with a mantra written by saint Sadasiva Brahmendra of the 18th century.

== Economy ==
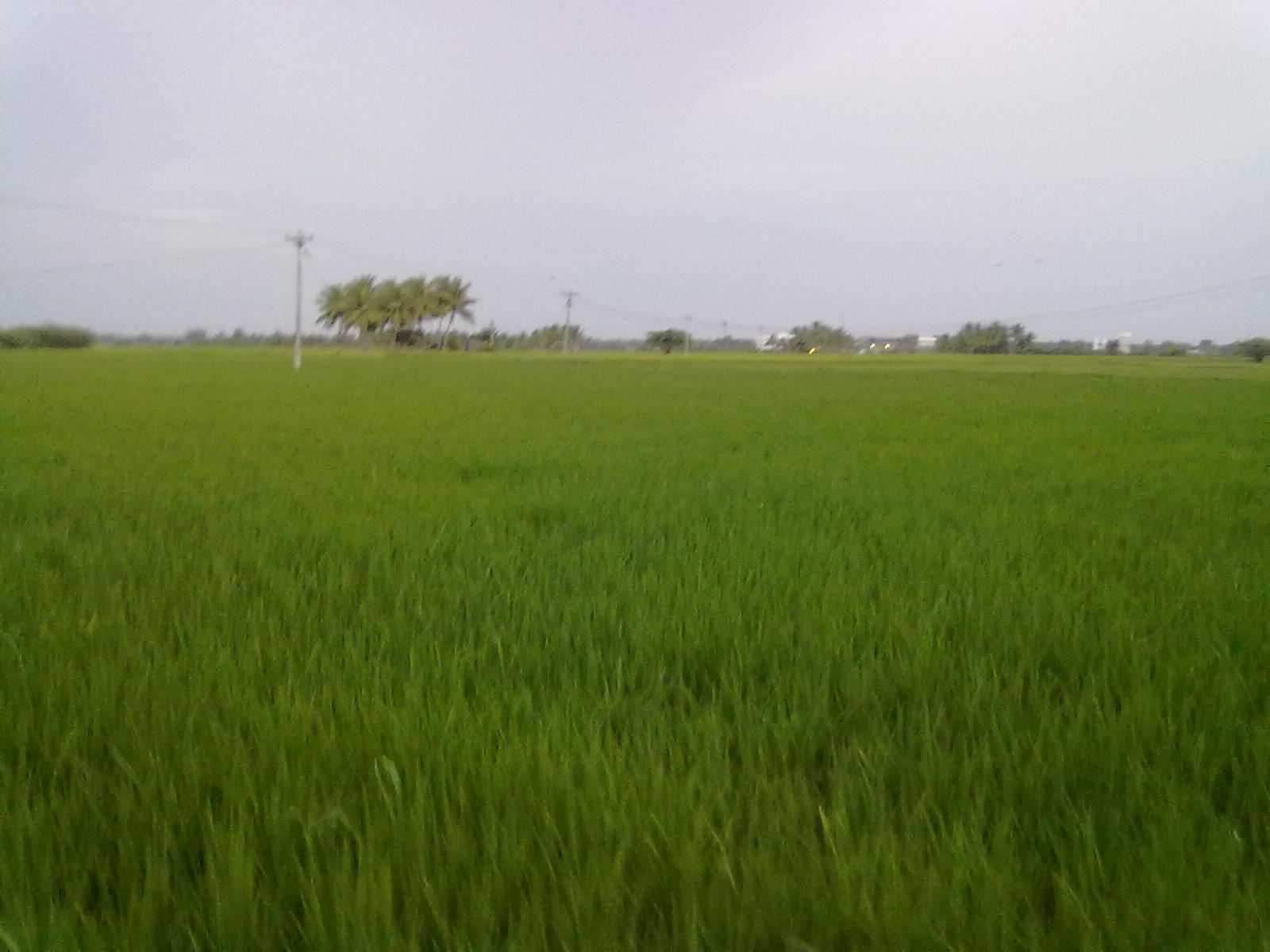
A paddy field in Regunathapuram Village of Pudukkottai district

The SIPCOT Industrial Complex is located on Tiruchirappalli – Rameswaram National Highways (NH 210). This Industrial complex is well connected by Road, Rail, and Air. It was established in 1980. The allotment of land commenced in 1982 to accommodate Engineering and General Industries. The total extent of complex area is 421.10 acres (1.7041 km^{2}).

Pudukkottai district is predominantly an agricultural oriented district. Generally a dry and hot climate prevails in this district and this district's agricultural production depends mainly on the rainfall. The normal annual rainfall of the Pudukkottai district is 922.8 mm. Out of which 52.2 mm is received in winter, 124.6 mm is received in hot weather period, 351.9 mm is received during southwest Monsoon and 394.1 mm is received in North-East Monsoon. Recently Tamil Nadu Agricultural University started Diploma college in agriculture at Kudimiyanmalai with a approximate strength of 50 students including girls.

There are 5,451 irrigation tanks available in this district, of which 172 tanks were system tanks fed by Grand Anaikat Channel and the remaining are rain-fed tanks. There are about 47,583 wells in the district catering an area of 100,993 Ha. Paddy is the major crop of this district. 90000 Ha. of the area is covered under paddy, out of which 135000 Ha. of the area is fed with Kaveri Mettur Project through the G.A. canal. The remaining area is well and tank fed. The present productivity level is 4.985 Mt. of Paddy /Ha. Other than Paddy, Groundnut is the major crop in this district which is mainly cultivated under rainfed conditions. Groundnut is being cultivated in 36000 Ha. as rain fed crop and 8000 Ha. under irrigated condition. Millet, pulse, cotton, sugarcane, gingelly are the other crops cultivated in this district.

== Education and utility services ==
As of 2011, there were 33 schools in Pudukkottai: nine primary schools, seven middle schools, and 17 high and higher secondary schools. There were three arts and science colleges, namely, H.H.The Rajah's College for men, Govt. Arts College for Women and Govt. College of Education. There were five industrial training institutes ITI in the town, namely, DIET, Govt. Industrial Technical Institute, Advanced I.T.I., Central ITI, Little flower ITI and SriBrahathambal ITI.

Electricity supply to Pudukkottai is regulated and distributed by the Tamil Nadu Electricity Board (TNEB). A Chief Distribution engineer is stationed at the regional headquarters. Water supply is provided by the Pudukkottai Municipality from the Cauvery river through Jeyapuram head water works located 86 km (53 mi) away and Ammaiyappatti water works located 9.06 km (5.63 mi). In the period 2000–2001, a total of 7 million litres of water was supplied every day for households in the town. As per the municipal data for 2011, about 30–35 metric tonnes of solid waste were collected from Pudukkottai every day by door-to-door collection and subsequently the source segregation and dumping was carried out by the sanitary department of the Pudukkottai municipality. The coverage of solid waste management in the town by the municipality had an efficiency of 100% as of 2001. There is no underground drainage system in the town and the sewerage system for disposal of sullage is through septic tanks, open drains and public conveniences.

The municipality maintained a total of 191 km (119 mi) of storm water drains in 2011: 55 km (34 mi) pucca drains and 136 km (85 mi) open drains. As of 2011, there were a total of 31 hospitals, municipal dispensary, private dispensaries and private general clinics and five clinical labs that take care of the health care needs of the citizens. As of 2011, the municipality maintained a total of 4,039 street lamps: 631 sodium lamps, 3,450 tube lights and one high mast beam lamp. The municipality operates one weekly market, two daily vegetable markets and one daily fish market that cater to the needs of the town and the rural areas around it.

Schools and colleges include:

- Agricultural College & Research Institute, Kudumiyanmalai
- Government Arts College for Women, Pudukkottai
- Government Medical College and Hospital, Pudukkottai
- H. H. The Rajah's College, Pudukkottai
- Mookambigai College of Engineering
- Mount Zion College of Engineering and Technology
- Mount Zion College of Nursing
- Valampuri Vaduganathan Higher Secondary School
- Vidyaa Vikas Higher Secondary School

== Sports ==
A major long-distance runner from Pudukkottai is Govindan Lakshmanan. Lakshmanan received gold medals for both 5000 and 10000 meter track in the 2017 Asian Athletics Championships. He is the first person from India to win two gold medals in the Asian Athletics Championships. He also took part in the world championships in London, 2017, and finished the 5,000 meters heat with a personal best of 13:35.69 minutes.

== See also ==
- Chola Nadu
- Pattathurani
