= Sethupathi (surname) =

Sethupathi is an Indian surname that may refer to

Indian royalty

- Sethupathi, rulers of Ramnad
  - Muthuramalinga Sethupathi II (1841–1873)
  - Raja Rajeswara Sethupathi (1889–1929)
  - Ramanatha Sethupathi (died 1979)
  - Vijayaraghunatha Sethupathi (died 1720)
  - Raghunatha Kilavan
  - Bhaskara Sethupathi

Others

- Rajkumar Sethupathi, Indian actor
- Shanmugha Rajeswara Sethupathi (1909–1967), Indian politician
- Vijay Sethupathi (born 1978), Indian film actor, producer, lyricist, and dialogue writer
- Latha (actress) or Latha Sethupathi, Indian actress, sister of Rajkumar Sethupathi
