= Sethupathi =

Tamil Kingdom

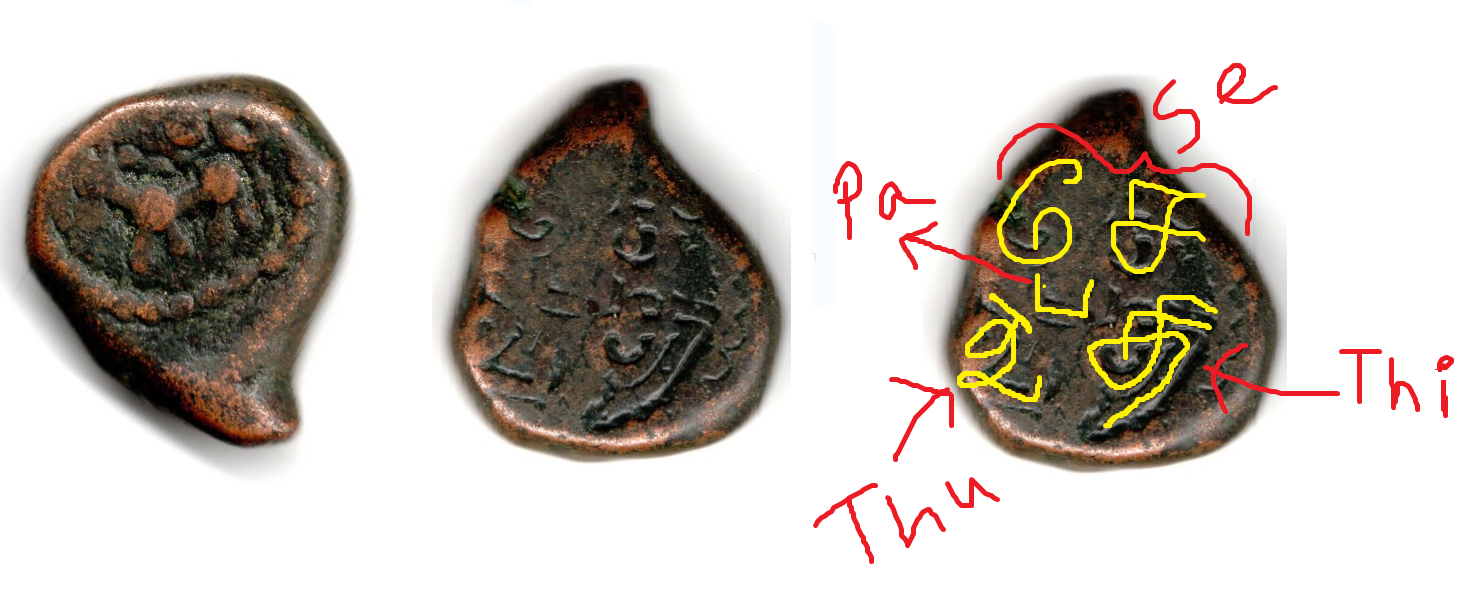
An 18th-century copper coin made under an unidentified Sethupathi king depicting a horse and the word Sethupathi in Tamil.

The Sethupathis are a Tamil clan of the Maravar community native to the Ramanathapuram and Sivaganga district of Tamil Nadu, India. They were from the 12th century considered independent kings in 16th century who ruled the Ramnad kingdom, also known as Maravar country. The male rulers of Ramnathapuram also bore the title of "Sethupathi" or "protector of the bridge", the bridge here referring to the legendary sacred Rama's Bridge (Adam's Bridge), while female rulers bore the title "Nachiyar". Among the 72 poligars (feudal title of chieftains under Nayaka rulers) of the region, the Sethupathi stood first. This special position was conferred not based upon the revenue that his kingdom generated but because of his military prowess. Back in the beginning of the 18th century, the Sethupathi ruler could mobilize a considerable army, about 30,000 to 40,000 strong at short notice (one week).

Under the Madurai Nayak king Muthukrishnappa Nayak, the first recorded Sethupathi, Saidaikan who assumed the title Udaiyan Rakunatha Sethupathi was installed as ruler from 1606–1621. The Sethupathis who were under the suzerainty of the Madurai Nayak, gained its full independence in 1702. The Ramnad Kingdom lost its independence under British Empire and became a Zamindari divided into the Ramnad estate also called Greater Marava and Sivaganga estate also called Little Marava.

== Etymology ==
The title Sethupathi is a Sanskrit term meaning "Lord of Sethu", where Sethu refers to Ram Setu, a chain of limestone shoals from Rameswaram Island in India to Mannar Island in Sri Lanka. The Maravar clan from 5th century CE were patrons of the Ramanathaswamy Temple, which is also known as Sethu and thereupon assumed the title Sethupathi. According to Jennifer Howes, while inscription evidence about Sethupathis is available only since early 17th century; two manuscripts collected by Colin Mackenzie attribute first coronation of Sethupathi in puranic past by none other than Ramayana-Rama himself. Howes says as per the manuscripts true rulership of South India was in the hands of Sethupathis during Pandya period and that the Cholas had dispossessed Sethupathis of their territories.

The title "Sethu Kavalar" meaning "Guardian of Sethu" was a title used by the Aryacakravarti dynasty of Jaffna Kingdom, who also used the term "Sethu" on their coin on account of being related to the Sethupathis.

== Sethupathis of Ramnad and Sivaganga ==
The rulers of Ramnad and Sivaganga region of early 17th century were called Sethupathis. The Nayak ruler Muthukrishnappa Nayak reestablished the ancient line of Sethupathys who were the chieftains under the pandyas in the beginning of 17th century as protector and guardian of the pilgrims to Sethusamudram and Rameswaram. The protector of Sethusamudram was called as Sethupathy. Sadaikkathevar emerged as the chief of the poligas. Sethupathis were maravas of Ramnad, Madurai and Tirunelveli. They had Ramnad as their official headquarters. Sadaikkathevar and his son KuttanSethupathi acted as Sethupathis and extended protection to the pilgrims who visited Rameswaram. Apart from giving protection two Sethupathis did religious services to the Ramanathaswamy temple at Rameswaram. The Sethupathis also issued copper coins until they became Zamindar in the 18th century, the coins depict horses and peacocks with deity on the obverse and the name Sethupathi in Tamil on the reverse.

== List of Sethupathis ==
- Sadaikka Thevar Sethupathi (1590–1621)
- Kootan Sethupathi (1621–1637)
- Dalavai Sethupathi (1637–1659)
- Raghunatha Thirumalai Sethupathi (1659–1670)

The independent kings were:

- Raghunatha Kilavan Sethupathi (1670–1708)
- Vijaya Raghunatha Sethupathi I (1708–1723)
- Sundaresvara Raghunatha Sethupathi (1723–1728)
- Kumara Muthu Vijaya Raghunatha Sethupathi (1728–1734)
- Muthukumara Raghunatha Sethupathi (1734–1747)
- Rakka Thevar (1747–1748)
- Vijaya Raghunatha Sethupathi II (1748–1760)
- Muthuramalinga Sethupathi (1760–1794)
- Ruler of princely state under the paramountcy of the British Raj
- Interregnum (1795—1803)

The zamindars are as follows:

- Mangaleswari Nachiyar (1803–1807)
- Annaswami Sethupathi (1807–1820)
- Ramaswami Sethupathi (1820–1830)
- Muthu Chella Thevar Sethupathi (1830–1846)
- Parvatha Vardhani Ammal Nachchiyar (1846–1862)
- Muthuramalinga Sethupathi II(1862–1873)

Court of Wards (1873–1889)

- Bhaskara Sethupathi (1889–1903)
- Dinakara Sethupathy
- Raja Rajeswara Sethupathi (1903–1929)
- Shanmugha Rajeswara Sethupathi(1929–1967)
- Ramanatha Sethupathi (1967–1979)
- Rajeswari Nachiyar (1979–present)

== Raghunatha Sethupathi II alias Kizhavan Sethupathi ==
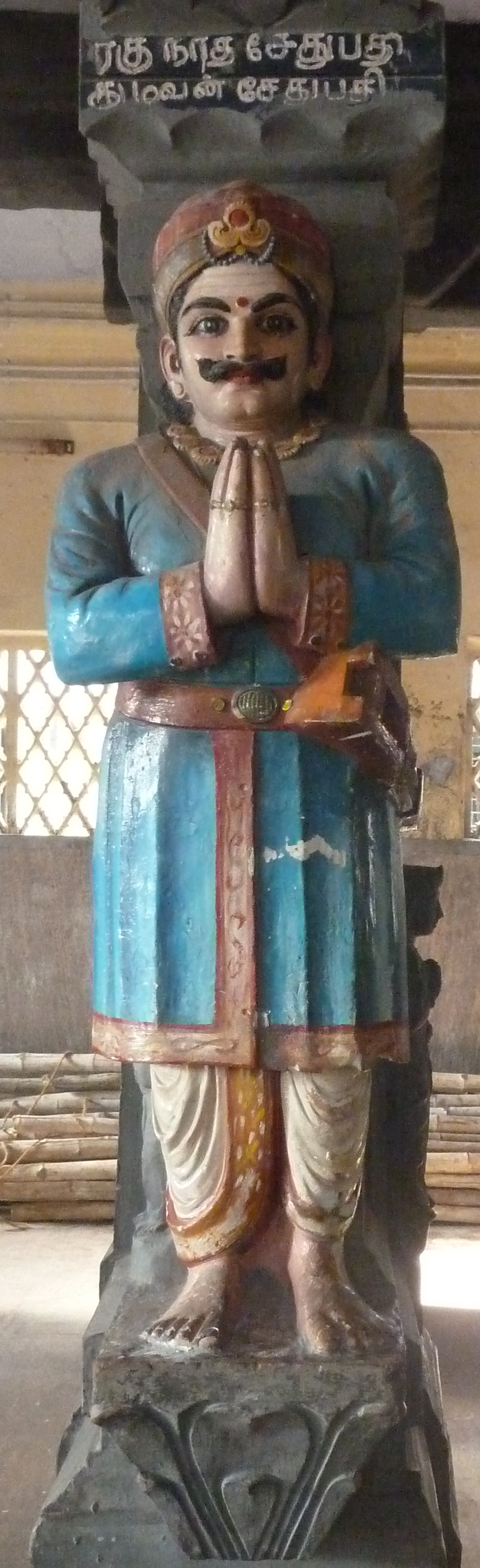
Kizhavan Sethupathi

Kizhavan Sethupathi (1671 AD to 1710 AD) was the greatest ruler among the Tamil kings. He was the seventh king of Ramnad. He was helpful to Chokkanatha Nayak. The Nayak king conferred him a title Para Rajakesari (Lion to alien kings). He annexed some territories of Madurai Kingdom. Aranthangi, Thirumayam, Piranmalai. He opposed the spread of Christian missionary activities. Kizhavan Sethupathi liberated the Marava country from the control of Madurai Nayak. After defeating Rani Mangammal's army, he declared independent Marava country in 1707. He shifted his headquarters from Pughalur to Ramnad. Kilavan Sethupathi established the Nalcottal palayam (later Sivaganga) and appointed Udaya Thevar as governor. He served well for the development of Hinduism. He endowed villages to a temple at Thiruvadanai and Kalaiyar Koil. He constructed a fort around the Ramanathapuram, the capital city. He constructed a dam across the Vaigai. His rule was marked as the golden age of the Maravas. Kilavan Sethupathi was succeeded by Bhavani Shankarathevar and Thandathevar.

== Post Kilavan Sethupathi ==
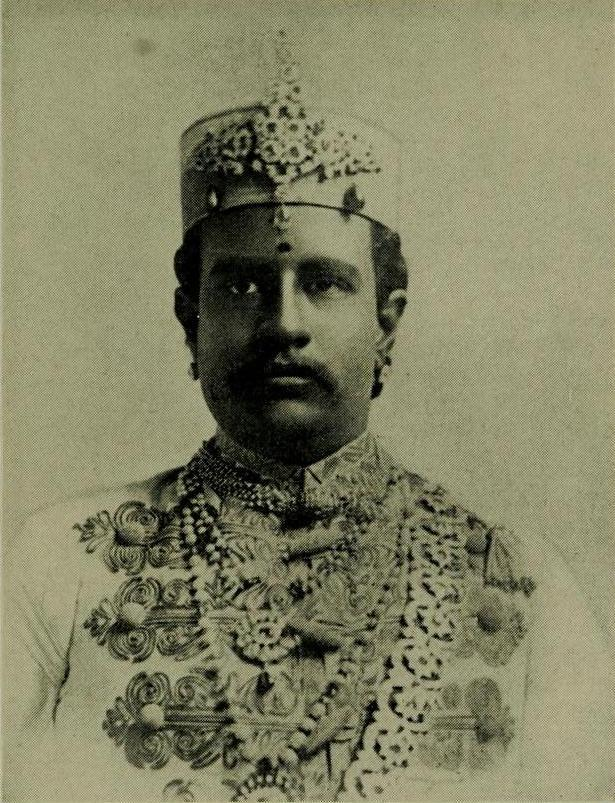
Bhaskara Sethupathy

Vijayaraghunatha Sethupathi became the 8th King of Ramnad in 1710 after the death of Kilavan Sethupathy. After Kilavan Sethupathi the kingdom was divided into two new Sivaganga Kingdom emerged. During the later period of Sethupathi's rule, the Ramnad was reduced to a zamin level. Then it was brought under the control of the Britishers. Finally it became a part of the Indian Union. Among the later Sethupathis, Bhaskara Sethupathy was an exceptionally enlightened zamindar. And his brother Raja Dhingara Sethupathi were English educated rulers.

Raja Dhinagara sethypathy become the zamindar after Bhaskara Sethypathy died from 1903. He honored Swami Vivekananda who attended the parliament of Religion at Chicago. on return of Swami Vivekananda both zamindars maeda great agenda on that day, for this they made a memorial pillar on Sigil Raha Street, Now the street is named after the "Swamy Vivekanandga Salai". The social life under Sethupathi's rule was good.

== See also ==
- Ramnad Kingdom
- Maravar, community to which Ramnad / Sethupathi kings belonged
- Thanjavur Nayak kingdom, once an ally and later adversary of Sethupathis
- Madurai Nayak dynasty, once and ally and later adversary of Sethupathis
- Marava War of Succession, war of succession after Vijaya Raghunatha Sethupathi
