= Ramnad Civil War (1637) =

- Part of Dutch–Portuguese War and Thirty Years' War outside Europe
Date	1637
Location	Tamilnadu, India
Result	Thampi faction victory

Belligerents
Thampi's faction Madurai Nayaks; Portugal	Sadaika II's faction Dutch Republic

Commanders and leaders
Thampi; Tirumala Nayaka; Ramaiyan; Rangama Nayaka	Sadaika II (POW); Vanniyan †; Raghunatha Sethupathi

The Ramnad Civil War of 1637 was a civil war fought between rival claimants to the throne of the Kingdom of Ramnad. The conflict began after the death of Kuttan Sethupathi, when his son Sadaika Deva II was challenged by his illegitimate brother Thampi who received support from the Tirumala Nayaka. Fighting broke out between Marava forces loyal to Sadaika and the Madurai armies sent to back Thampi. The war caused serious disorder and suffering throughout the Marava country and ended only after several changes of rulers and the later division of the region to bring stability.

== Background ==
Kuttan Sethupathi became the ruler of Ramnad around 1623 and governed the region until about 1635. He was succeeded by his son Sadaika Tevar II, also known as Dalavay Sethupathi. After ruling peacefully for nearly two years, Dalavay Sethupathi faced a serious challenge from his illegitimate younger brother called the Tamphi who claimed the Sethupathi title and gained support from Tirumala Nayaka. Despite this Dalavay Sethupathi stood firm ready to defend his position and enjoyed strong support from the people. As a result conflict between the Nayak of Madurai and the Sethupathi of Ramanathapuram became unavoidable.

== War ==
=== Battle of Ariyandapurakottai ===
With Rangama Nayakka as his deputy, Ramaiyan began his punitive campaign and led a large army along the Vaigai River. The force halted first at Chinnaravuttanpalayam and then moved on to Vandiyur before passing through Tiruppuvanam and reaching Manamadurai. When Sadaika Sethupathi learned of this advance he became angry and quickly gathered his troops to face the Madurai army with strong support from his brave son-in-law Vanniyan. The two sides met in battle at Ariyandapurakottai, where the Marava forces won a clear victory, plundering the Madurai Army camp and killing many soldiers. However, Ramaiyanrecovered from the setback and renewed the attack the next day and after heavy fighting he succeeded in capturing Ariyandapurakottai.

=== Battle of Aviyuttikottai ===
Ramaiyan closely pursued the retreating Marava forces and reached Kadankudi, where he crossed the Vaigai River. He caught up with the enemy at Avtiyuttikottai, and a battle followed in which Sadaika Deva himself was wounded. In this battle the Madurai army gained the advantage and pushed the Marava forces back. Despite the bravery of Vanniyan, Sadaika was forced to retreat again and Avtiyuttikottai was quickly occupied by Ramaiyan. Still under pressure Sadaika finally crossed the channel and withdrew towards Rameswaram.

=== Bijapur Invasion ===
At this point, Tirumala Nayaka was forced to turn his attention to the northern borders of his kingdom where the Sultan of Bijapur was preparing to invade. Ramaiyan was sent to meet this threat and successfully defeated the Sultan’s forces. After securing the northern front the general returned to continue the campaign in the Marava country.

=== Siege of Rameshwaram ===
To attack Rameswaram, Ramaiyan decided to build a bridge across the sea and, according to the "Ramaiyan Ammanai" he rebuilt the legendary Sethu. When his soldiers hesitated Ramaiyan himself is said to have laid the first stone encouraging the army to continue the work. Soon the bridge was completed and the forces advanced. Sadaika Sethupathi sought help from the Dutch of Ceylon, while Tirumala Nayaka secured support from the Portuguese, confirmed by Portuguese records and Jesuit letters that mention naval battles between the two sides. During the fighting Vanniyan the brave general of Sadaika was killed. Ramaiyan then defeated the Sethupathi and brought him as a prisoner to Madurai.

== Aftermath ==
Sadaika Deva was kept as a prisoner in the capital and Thampi was appointed as the new Sethupathi. However, Thampi soon became unpopular in the Marava country and Ragunatha Deva and Narayana Deva the nephews of the former Sethupathi strongly opposed his rule. Disorder spread once again across the region showing Thampi’s failure to maintain peace. At the same time, the Bairagis a group of Vaishnava devotees visiting Rameswaram appealed to Tirumala Nayaka to restore Sadaika. Realizing that only Sadaika Deva could bring stability, Tirumala released him and returned his kingdom.

Sadaika Deva ruled for a few more years but was later murdered by Thampi. To end the disputes among the rival claimants, Tirumala Nayaka decided to divide the Marava country around the year 1646. The region was split into three parts Ramanathapuram was given to Ragunatha Deva, Sivaganga was allotted to Thampi, and Tiruvadanai was placed under the control of Tanaka Deva.

== See also ==
- Chokkanatha Nayak Invasion of Ramnad
- Battle of Madurai (1656)
- Kingdom of Ramnad
