= Madurai Invasion of Ramnad (1702) =

- Part of Madurai-Ramnad Conflicts
Date	1702
Location	Tamilnadu, India
Result	Ramnad victory: Ramnad Kingdom became independent

Belligerents
Madurai Nayakas; Supported by: Thanjavur Marathas	Ramnad Kingdom

Commanders and leaders
Rani Mangammal; Narsappaiya †; Shahuji I	Raghunatha Kilavan

Strength
Unknown	30,000–40,000

The Madurai invasion of Ramnad (1702) was a military campaign undertaken by the Madurai Nayak kingdom under the regent Rani Mangammal against Raghunatha Kilavan Sethupathi. Led by Dalavay Narasappaiya the expedition sought to reassert Madurai's authority over the increasingly independent Maravar state. The campaign ended in a Marava victory with Narasappaiya killed in battle after which Raghunatha Sethupathi established Ramnad State as an independent kingdom.

== Background ==
During Rani Mangammal's regency, the power of Raghunatha Sethupathi steadily increased, as Ranga Krishna Muthu Virappa Nayak had been unable to restrain his growing autonomy. Taking advantage of the political difficulties faced by Madurai, Raghunatha Sethupathi gradually freed himself from the kingdom's authority. A letter written by Martin in 1700 states that the Maravars were effectively independent and paid only as much tribute to Madurai as they wished. Around 1698, the Maravas besieged and captured Madurai holding the city for a short time before Dalavay Narasappaiya recaptured it and restored Madurai Kingdom's control.

== Invasion ==
In 1702, Mangammal sent an army against Raghunatha Sethupathi likely in response to his support for the Thanjavur Marathas during Madurai's war against Thanjavur in 1700. Dalavay Narasappaiya led the expedition with the support of Thanjavur and invaded the Marava country. However, Raghunatha Sethupathi defeated the Madurai army and Narasappaiya was killed during the campaign. Historians have suggested that Madurai's defeat was due to the exhaustion of its forces after years of continuous warfare. In contrast, the Maravar army was more cohesive being recruited largely from a single martial community experienced in irregular warfare. The Sethupathi was also able to mobilize between thirty thousand and forty thousand troops within a short period. These military advantages contributed significantly to the Maravar state's successful assertion of independence from Madurai Nayakas during a period when the Nayak kingdom had been weakened by prolonged military campaigns.

== Aftermath ==
Around 1702, Raghunatha Sethupathi broke away from the Madurai Nayak kingdom and established an independent Marava state. After securing his independence he strengthened the fortifications at Ramanathapuram (Ramnad) to defend and consolidate his rule.

== See also ==
- Chokkanatha Nayak
- Marvar
- Ramanathapuram
