= Invasion of Venad =

1634–1635 Nayaka military campaign

- Part of Madurai-Venad Conflicts
Date	October 1634 – March 1635
Location	Kerala, India
Result	Madurai Nayaks victory

Belligerents
Madurai Nayakas	Venad Kingdom

Commanders and leaders
Tirumala Nayaka; Ramaiyan	Unni Kerala Varma; Iravikkutti Pillai †

Casualties and losses
	Heavy

Tirumala Nayaka’s invasion of Venad was a military campaign was initiated by Tirumala Nayaka to bring the ruler of Venad under the authority of Madurai Nayaks and make him pay tribute. Madurai forces entered the Nanjanad region and defeated the Venad army at the battle of Kaniyakulam. During the campaign, several towns were attacked and plundered, causing widespread damage. In the end the ruler of Venad accepted the authority of Tirumala Nayaka bringing the region under Madurai Nayak’s influence.

== Background ==
Venad Kingdom, which had earlier been a feudatory of the Vijayanagar Empire was unwilling to accept the authority of the Nayaks of Madurai when they claimed tribute as Vijayanagar’s successors. To assert Nayak supremacy and force Venad’s submission Tirumala Nayaka led an expedition to Nanjanad.

== Invasion ==
The earliest historical evidence of Tirumala Nayaka’s invasion of Nanjanad comes from a nittu (royal edict) dated 22nd Kumbhom 837, corresponding to 1662 A.D. This order was issued by the ruler of Venad to the ryots of Nanjanad and announced a remission of taxes. The record was preserved among the cadjan manuscripts kept by the Periaveettu Mudaliar.

"Whereas it has been represented to us at our residence at Kalkulam by the nattars (ryots) between Mangalam and Manakudi, including those of perumpattu tali and Sanketam, that the country is smitten by calamities, having had no cultivation for the Kar (Kanni) crop of 810, and that, as Pisanam (Kumbham) cultivation was not begun owing to the advent of Thirumala Nayakkar’s forces and as the crops raised of Manalvari, Samba and Adikkiravi (different kinds of paddy) suffered by blight, the ryots have not the where-withal to begin fresh cultivation, we are pleased to command on this the 22nd day of the month of Masi in the year 810 M.E., that the levying of oruppoo-melvaram (a fixed tax) be given up for the Pisanam crop and that this fact viz., that simple melvaram alone will be realized on the Pisanam cultivation between Mangalam and Manakudi including perumpattu, tali and sanketam be duly notified to the ryots of the said places in the southern portion of Nanjanad north”.

The document mentioned above along with other references in the Mudaliar Manuscripts gives a clear picture of Tirumala Nayaka’s invasions of Nanjanad and the hardships faced by the people. The cadjan record helps fix the date of the invasion as it notes the failure to cultivate the Kanni crop of Kollam Era 810, which corresponds to 1634 A.D. This shows that Tirumala Nayaka’s first invasion likely occurred towards the end of Kollam Era 809, around 1634 A.D. While all historians agree that the invasion did take place they differ in their views about its final results.

=== Battle of Kaniyakulam ===
Madurai army under the command of Ramaiyan defeated the Travancore army led by Iravikkutti Pillai at the battle of Kaniyakulam, in which the Travancore commander was killed. The ballad "Ramappayyan Ammanai" records that Tirumala Nayaka subdued the Malayalam country, placed the ruler of Nanjanad as the foremost among his twenty-seven polygars and appointed him to guard the fortifications of the Pandya capital. It also states that the king of Nanjanad later supported Tirumala Nayaka in his war against the Sethupathi of Ramnad. Historian R. Sathyanatha Iyer points out that this cooperation supports the view that Tirumala Nayaka was successful in his campaign against Travancore.

Although Nagam Aiya questioned the reliability of the ballad, he clearly stated that Tirumala Nayaka’s forces attacked Nanjanad and took control of some parts of it around Kollam Era 809, corresponding to 1634 A.D. This view is supported not only by literary sources but also by inscriptional evidence. Inscriptions from Kudiraipandivilai and Vaiyalivilai in the Agasthiswaran Taluk, along with copies of royal edicts, show that Tirumala Nayaka’s armies invaded Nanjanad several times, conquering and plundering the region. These repeated invasions left the country in disorder for nearly fifty years.

T. K. Velu Pillai does not accept the literary and inscriptional sources as clear proof of Tirumala Nayak’s victory and instead argues that Venad won the conflict. He bases his view on a local ballad "Iravi Kutty Pillai Pattu" which praises the brave death of Iravikkutti Pillai while fighting the invading forces. According to him the ballad and local tradition together support Travancore’s success. However, Dr. K. K. Pillai disagrees and points out that the ballad is not a fully reliable historical source. He notes that while it describes the heroic death of Iravikkutti Pillai it does not clearly state that the Venad king achieved victory and he concludes.

“as has happened in several wellknown battles, the death of the general spelt the doom of the fighting force”.

== See also ==
- Marthanda Varma
- Kingdom of Travancore
- Cheras
