= Marava war of succession =

The Marava war of succession was the war of succession between, Vijayaraghunatha Sethupathi, the heir apparent and eldest son of Raghunatha Kilavan, and Tanda Thevar for the throne of Ramnad kingdom, also known as the Maravar Kingdom. The war of succession and the ensuing civil war lasted from 1720 to 1729 and resulted in the partitioning of the Ramnad kingdom reducing its power and influence.

== Prelude ==
Raghunatha Kilavan, the founder of the Kingdom of Ramnad, died in 1710. He was an excellent soldier and his death left behind a huge void. Prior to his death, Kilavan had first nominated his illegitimate son, Bhavani Shankar and later, due to protests from the people, chose his younger son, Vijayaraghunatha Sethupathi to succeed him. Bhavani Shankar abided by the king's decision but an uneasy calm prevailed throughout Ramnad.

== Events ==
Bhavani Shankar eventually revolted in 1720 and securing the help of the Thanjavur Maratha king Serfoji I and the Raja of Pudukkottai, invaded Vijayaraghunatha Sethupathi's seat at Aranthangi. While defending the city, Vijayaraghunatha Sethupathi fell victim to plague and died. Just before his death, Vijayaraghunatha Sethupathi nominated Tanda Deva, a great-grandson of Raghunatha Kilavan's father to succeed him but before he could acceded to the throne, Bhavani Shankar overthrew him with the support and influence of one of Kilavan's concubines.

Tanda Deva secured the support of the Madurai Nayak king and the Raja of Pudukkottai who had switched sides and invaded Aranthani forcing Bhavani Shankar to flee to Thanjavur. But, Bhavani Shankar won over the Thanjavur Maratha ruler promising him Aranthangi in return and defeated the combined armies of Ramnad, Madurai and Pudukkottai within two or three months. Tanda Deva was eventually captured and killed.

Bhavani Shankar ascended the throne for a second time but did not rule for long. His reign was highly unpopular and most of his trusted generals deserted him. Meanwhile, Bhavani Shankar had earned the ire of the Thanjavur Maratha ruler Tukkoji as he had failed to keep up his promise of delivering Aranthangi to the Thanjavur Marathas. The discontented elements in the kingdom, therefore, approached the Tukkoji and sought his help in overthrowing Bhavani Shankar. Tukkoji invaded Ramnad. Bhavani Shankar was defeated in 1729 in the Battle of Uraiyur and taken prisoner to Thanjavur.

== Aftermath ==
The victorious Thanjavur Maratha forces partitioned the Kingdom of Ramnad into three – all the territories to the north of Pambar River were annexed to the Thanjavur Maratha kingdom. The rest of the kingdom was more or less equally split between Kattaya Deva, a nobleman in the Ramnad court and the maternal uncle of Tanda Deva, who ascended the throne of Ramnad as Kumara Muthu Vijayaraghunatha Sethupathi and one of the Ramnad feudatories who became the first Raja of Sivaganga. The Ramnad kingdom lost most of its power and influence due to this war.

== See also ==
- Ramnad Kingdom
- Sethupathi, title of Raghunatha Kilavan and his descendants
- Maravar, community to which Ramnad / Sethupathi kings belonged
- Thanjavur Nayak kingdom, once and ally and later adversary of Sethupathis
- Madurai Nayak dynasty, once and ally and later adversary of Sethupathis
