= Thirumayam Fort =

Historical landmark built by king Vijaya Raghunatha Sethupathi

- Part of Tamil Nadu
- Pudukkottai District, Tamil Nadu, India
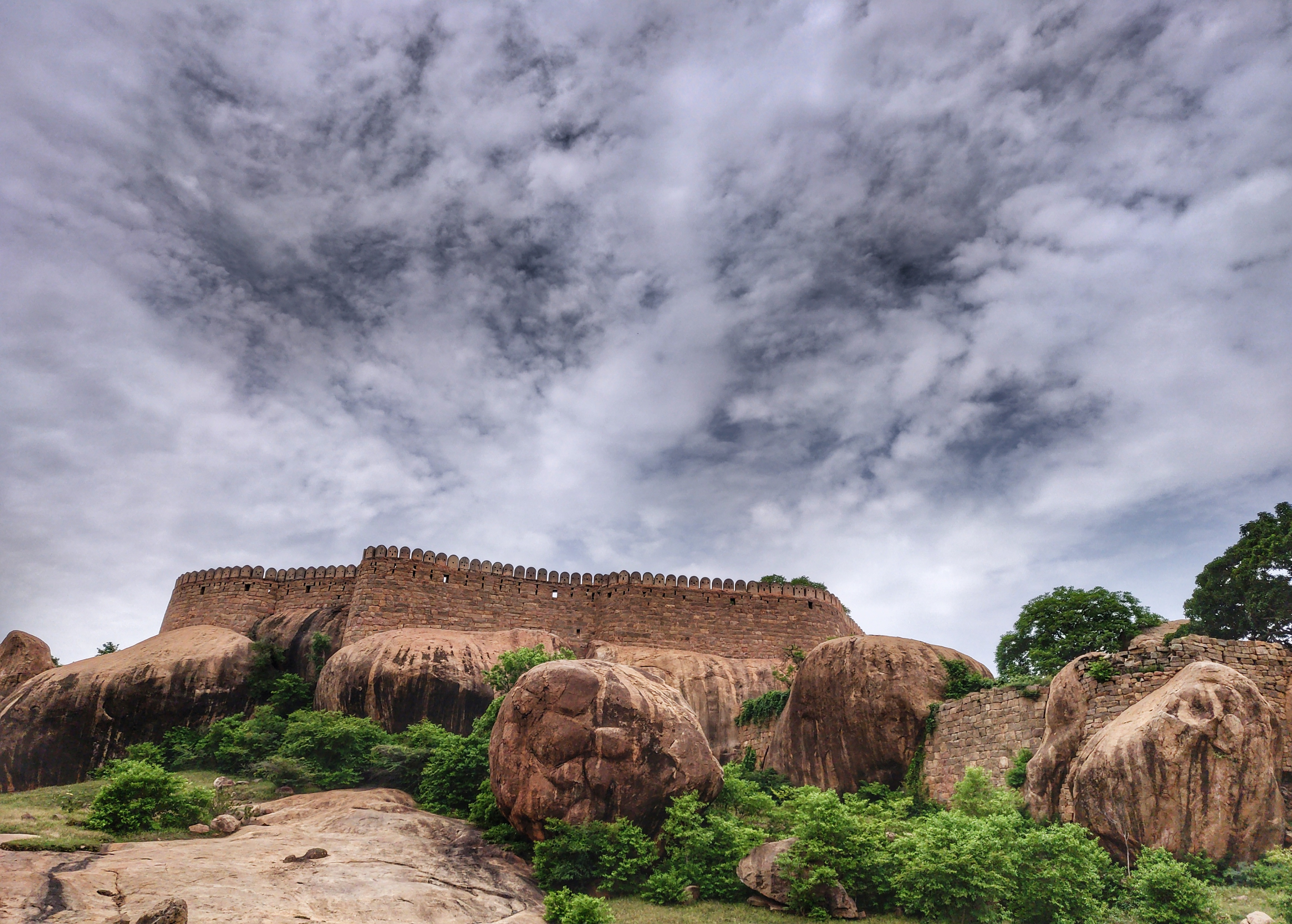

Site information
- Type: Forts
- Controlled by: Government of Tamil Nadu
- Condition: Ruins

Location
- Location within Tamil Nadu
- Coordinates: 10.2471°N 78.7508°E

The Thirumayam Fort is a 40-acre wide fortress in the town of Thirumayam in Pudukkottai-Karaikudi Highway in Pudukkottai District, Tamil Nadu, India. It was constructed by Vijaya Raghunatha Sethupathi, the Raja of Ramnad in 1687. Later the fort was handed over to his brother in law Raghunatha Raya Tondaiman. The fort has been extensively renovated by Archaeological Survey of India in 2012.

== Architecture ==
The fort originally said to have been a 'ring fort' with seven concentric walls has only four surviving now. The construction of the fort is of inferior quality as small blocks of stone were used along with bricks for the building of the fortification.

The fort has three entrances; one on the north, another on the south and third on the east. The shrines dedicated to Hanuman, Sakthi, Ganapathi, Karuppar (guardian deities of the fort) are noticed on the southern side and shrine to Bhairava on the northern side. Halfway to the top on the right side a chamber which was used as magazine was noticed. Opposite to this chamber on the western slope of a boulder is a rock cut cell containing a linga on yonipitha, the spout of which is supported by the figure of a dwarf.

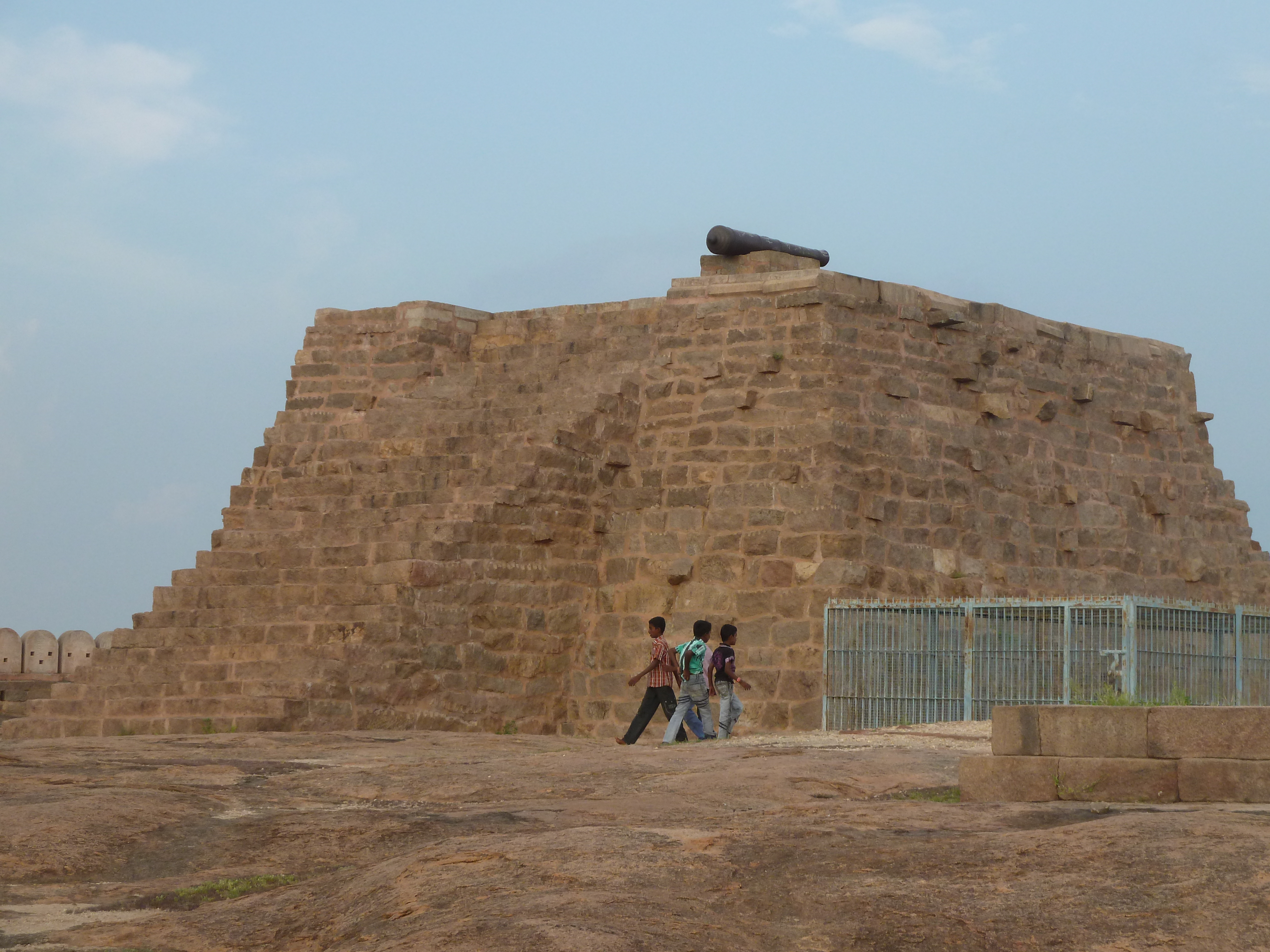
bastion with cannon of British origin

On the top of the rock is a bastion with cannon of British origin. To the south of this Platform is a natural pond. On the southern slope there are two rock cut temples, one of them dedicated to Sri Sathyamurthy-Sri Uyyavanda Nachiar (Vaishnavite), the Sathyamurthi Perumal Temple and another to Sri Sathyagireeswarar-Sri Venuvaneeswari (Saivite) the Sathyagirisvarar Temple, Thirumayam, Which are historically and religiously more important. To the northwest is another pond and to the southeast another tank. There are six more cannons mounted in the north, south and east gates.

== Historical importance ==
The fortress is of great historical significance and was an important stronghold of rebel chieftains in the Polygar Wars. Oomathurai, the brother of Panchalankurichi chieftain Kattabomman was captured in this fort. The fort is locally known as Oomayan Kottai(fort of the dumb). The fort is maintained and administered by the Archaeological Survey of India as a ticketed monument.

== Gallery ==
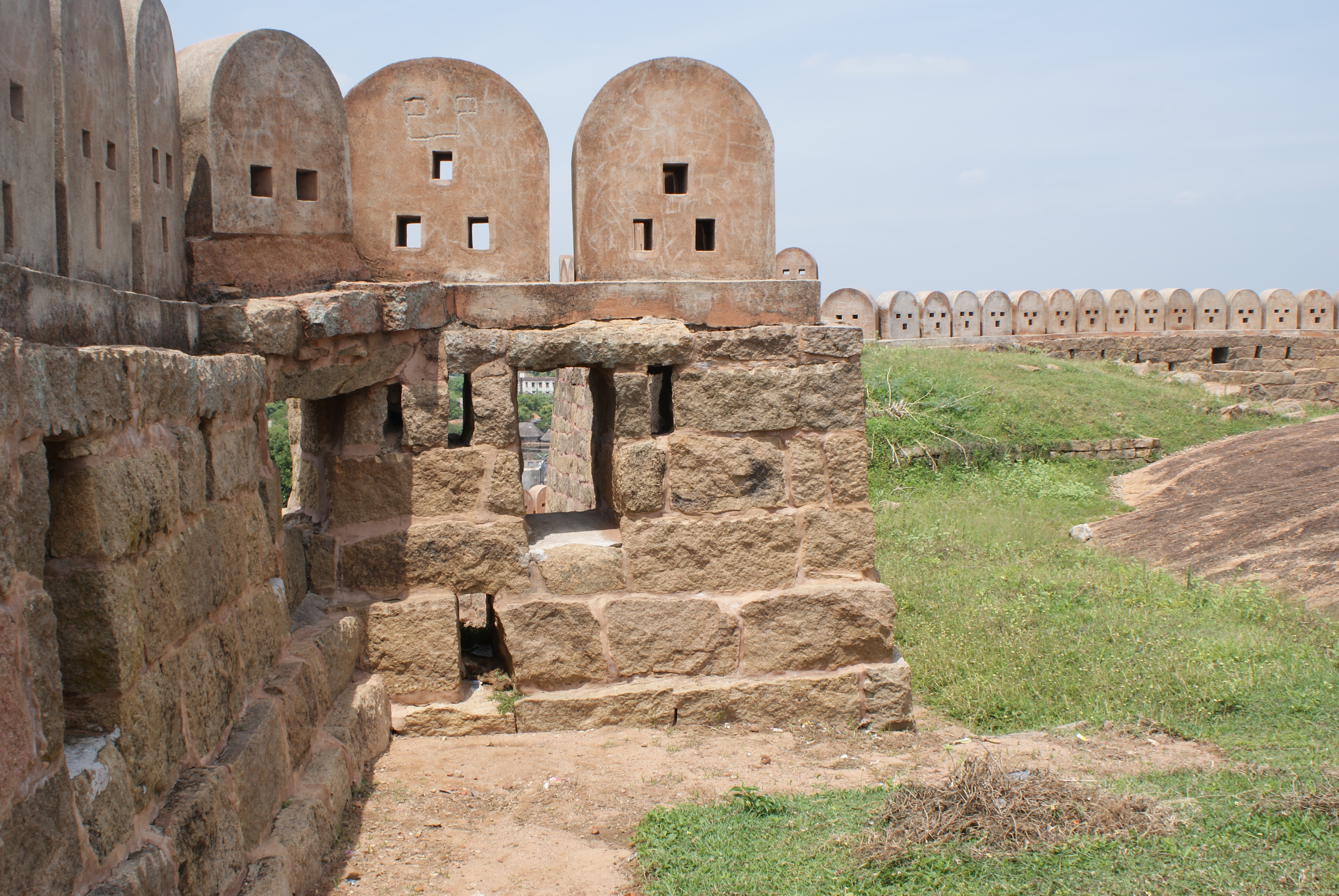
As seen from inside the fort

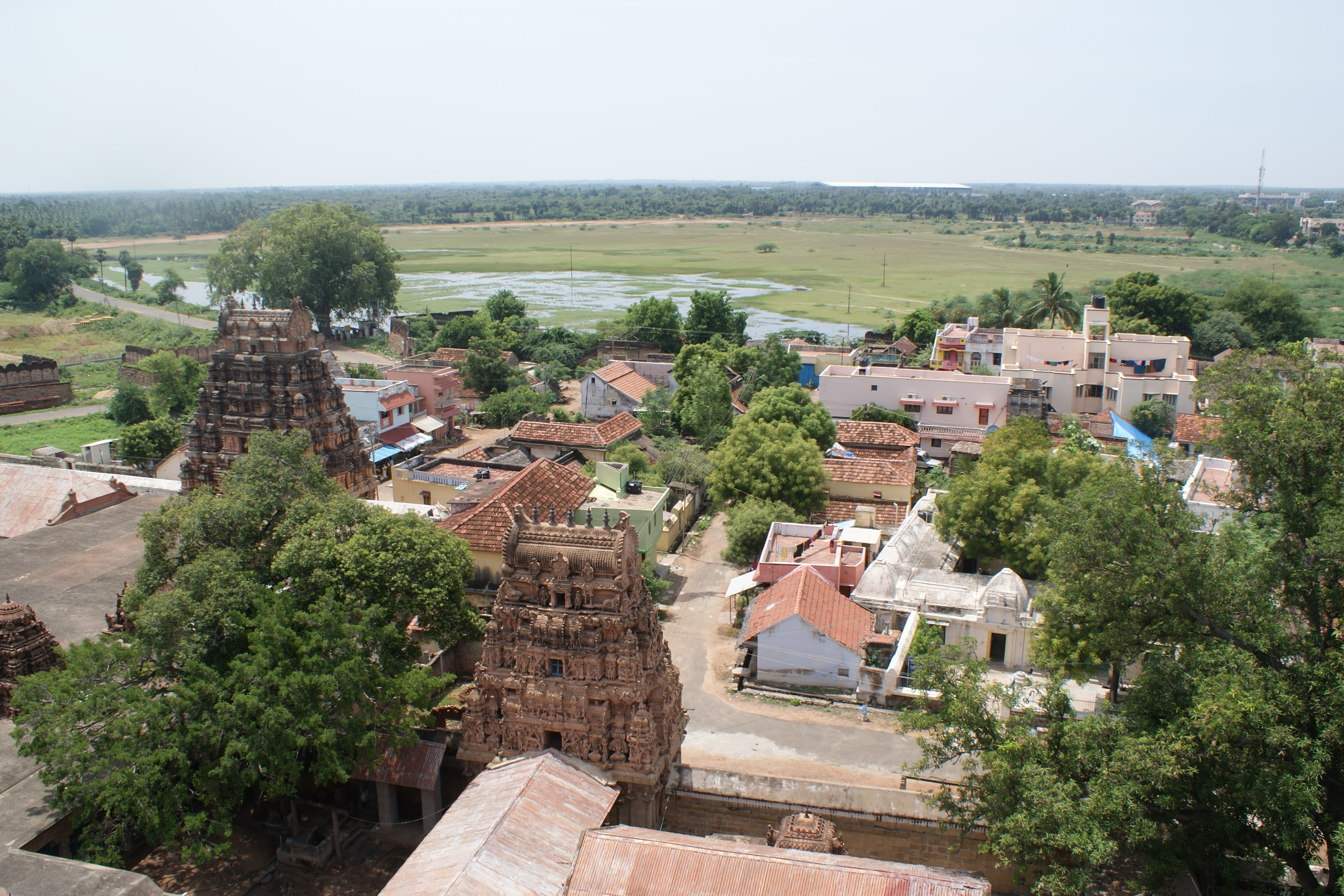
Thirumayam seen from fort

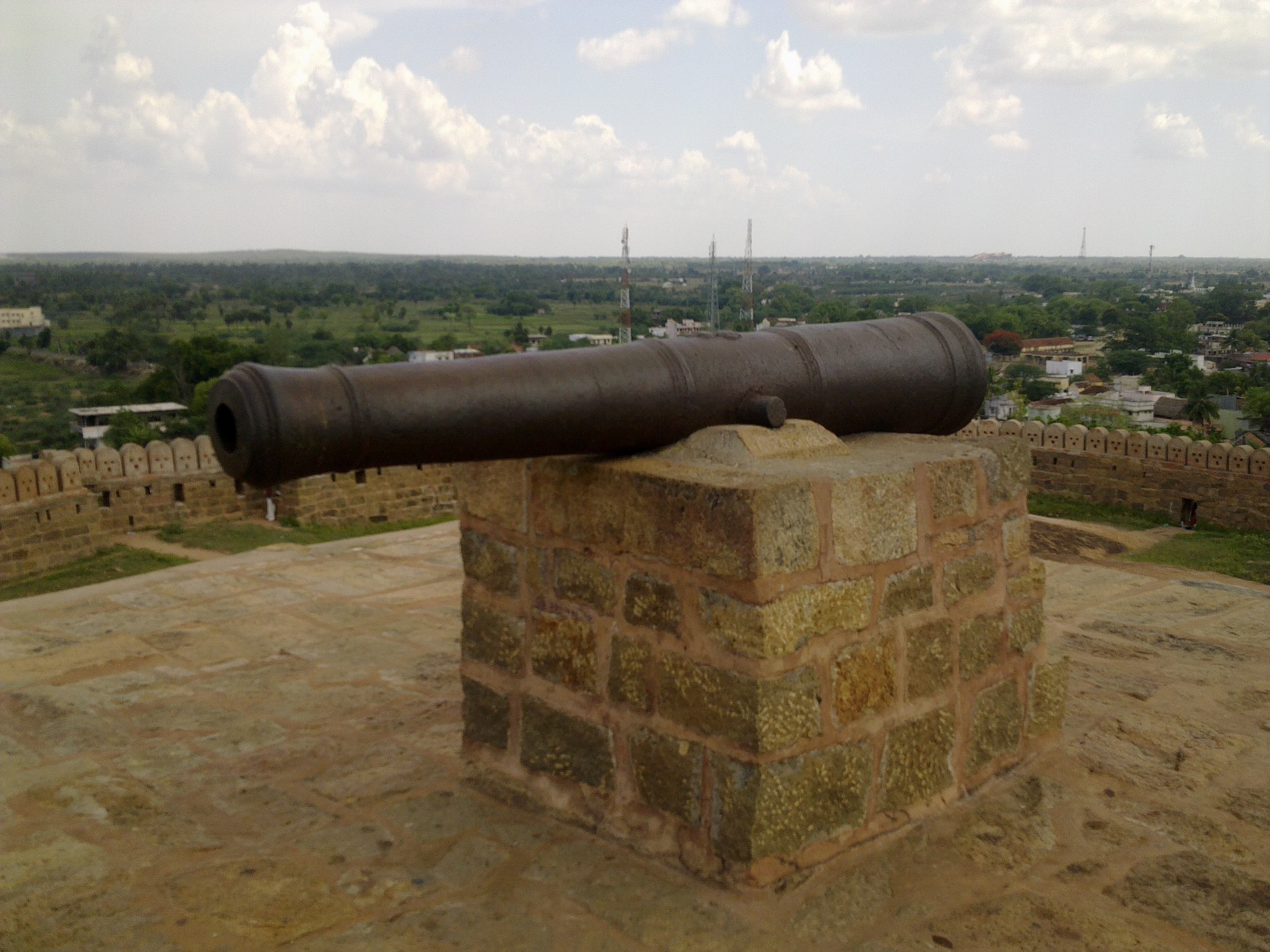
the tank look alike in the top of the Thirumayam fort. This is supposed to have been used during times of war.

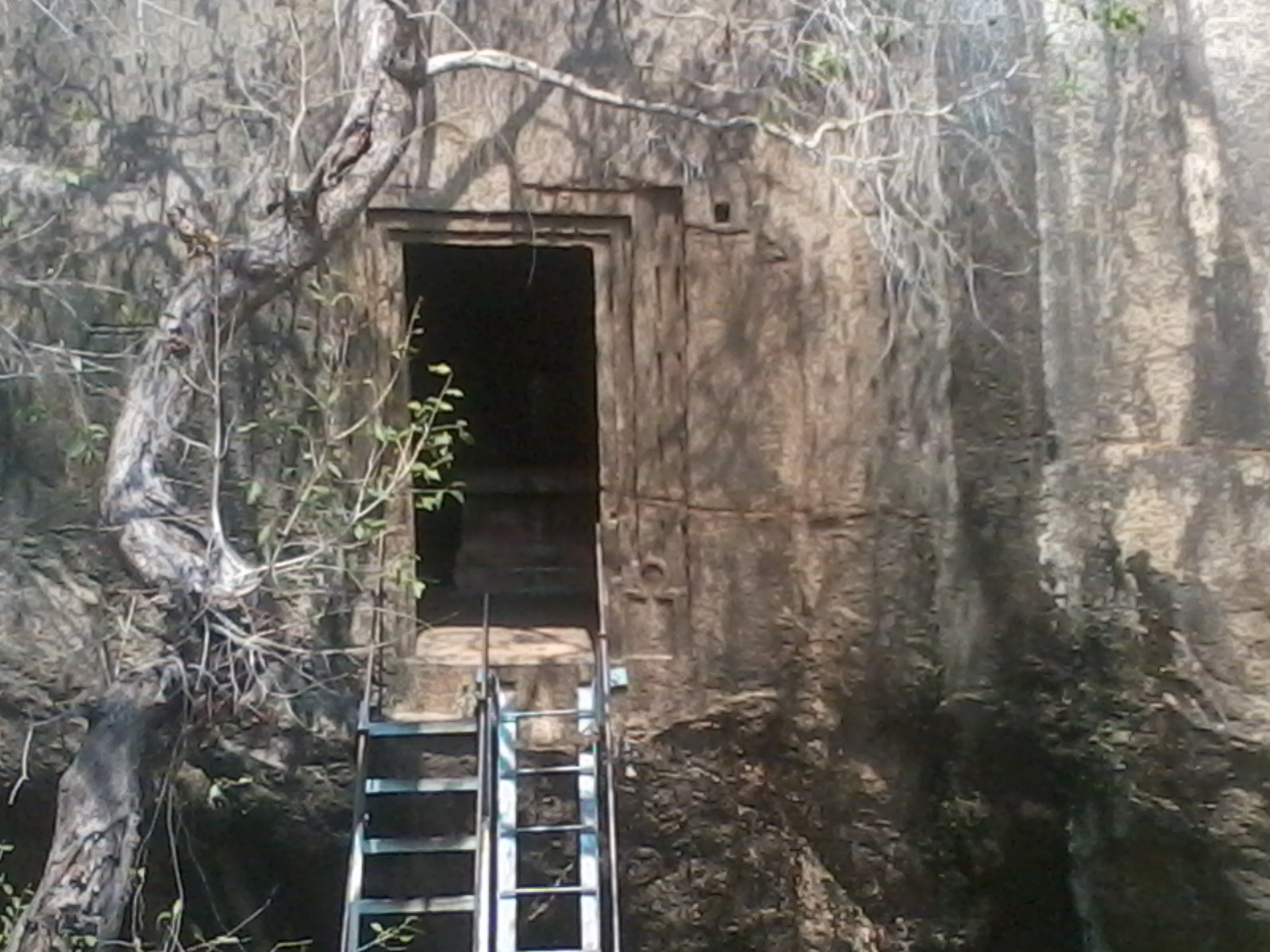
Discovered chamber on the side of the fort

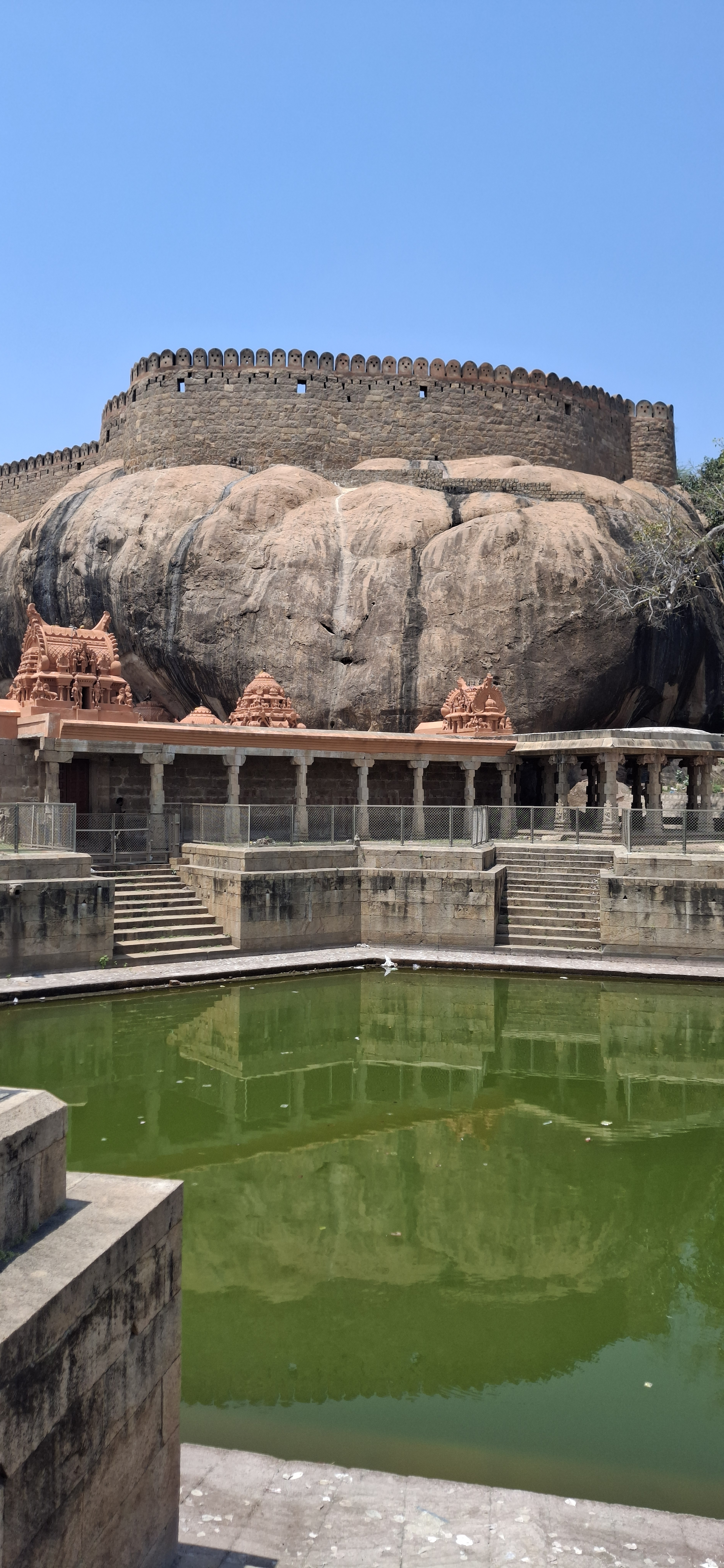
Thirumayam Fort Tank and Temple
