= Sastar Temple, Kannangarakkudi =

Sastar Temple is a Hindu temple dedicated to the deity Aiyanar, located at Kannangarakkudi in Pudukkottai district in Tamil Nadu, India.

== Location ==
This temple is located at Kannangarakkudi at a distance of 16 km from Thirumayam.

== Presiding deity ==
The presiding deity is known as Sastar. He is found with his consorts Purna and Pushkala. This temple has artha mandapa, maha mandapa and sanctum sanctorum. In 1954 and 1996 the Kumbhabhishekham of this temple took place.

== Speciality ==
This temple is meant for a devotee who was named as Kannan. Those who are affected by black magic and connected diseases would get cured, if they come over to this temple, made a halt for days to 48 days, took a holy bath in the tank and worshipped the deity.

== Worshipping time ==
Pujas are held four times daily at Kalasanthi (8.00 a.m.), Uttchikkalam (noon 12.00), Sayaratchai (5.30 p.m.) and Arthajamam (8.00 p.m.). The temple is opened for worship from 6.00 a.m. to 12.30 p.m. and from 4.30 p.m. to 8.00 p.m. During the Tamil month of Panguni 10 day festival is held. Navaratri and Sivaratri are also held in a grand manner.
