= Chokkanatha Nayak Invasion of Ramnad =

- Part of Madurai-Ramnad Conflicts
- French map of India, 1733
Date	1664–1665
Location	Tamil Nadu, India
Result	Stalemate

Belligerents
Madurai Nayakas	Kingdom of Ramnad

Commanders and leaders
Chokkanatha Nayak	Thirumalai Raghunatha Sethupathi

Chokkanatha Nayak invasion of Ramnad was a military campaign initiated by Chokkanatha Nayak to punish the Sethupati for refusing to support him against the Bijapur Sultanate. He captured several forts, but the Sethupathi evaded him by retreating into the jungles. Frustrated by prolonged guerrilla warfare, Chokkanatha returned to Madurai leaving his officers in charge. Taking advantage of this the Sethupathi launched counterattacks and secured minor victories. Realizing the difficulty of subduing his vassal Chokkanatha Nayak withdrew most of his troops but kept key forts garrisoned to maintain control over the region.

== Background ==
In 1663, a Bijapur army under the command of Vanamian launched an invasion of the Madurai Nayaka kingdom laying siege to Trichinopoly and devastating the surrounding villages and farmlands. The campaign was marked by widespread atrocities against the local population, causing immense suffering. Chokkanatha Nayak the ruler of Madurai, managed to secure the withdrawal of the Bijapuri forces by paying a heavy ransom. However, soon after this crisis, Chokkanatha Nayak turned his attention to the Sethupati of Ramnad who had refused to support him against the Bijapuris. Viewing this act as treason, Chokkanatha launched a military expedition against the Sethupathi, seeking to punish him for his disloyalty.

== Invasion ==
Chokkanatha Nayak determined to subdue his rebellious vassal, marched into the Marava country with his forces and captured several key forts, including Thirupatthur, Pudukottai, and Manamadurai. His campaign extended deep into the dense and rugged jungle territories, culminating in the seizure of the strategically significant Kalaiyar Kovil. Despite these victories, the Sethupathi of Ramnad remained unfazed by the losses. Rather than engaging in direct confrontation, he skillfully retreated to well-hidden and secure locations within the dense forests, where Chokkanatha’s army found it impossible to pursue him.

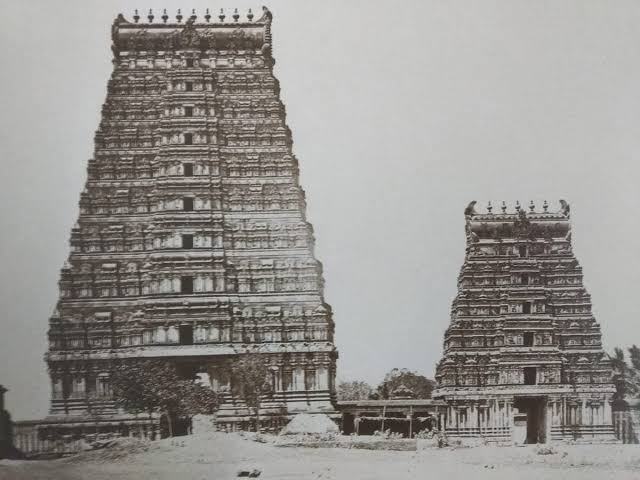
Gopurams of Kalayar Kovil

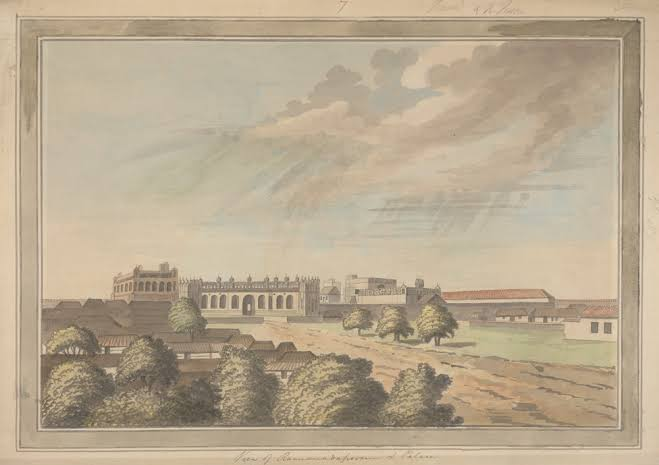
Palace of Ramanathapuram,1734

Chokkanatha Nayak grew weary of the prolonged conflict. Realizing the difficulty of pursuing an enemy who continually evaded direct confrontation, he decided to withdraw from the campaign. Prioritizing religious obligations, he returned to Madurai to participate in significant religious ceremonies. Before his departure, he entrusted the command of his army to his officers, delegating the responsibility of continuing military operations in the Marava country.

the Sethupathi of Ramnad, emboldened by the Chokkanatha Nayak's absence, swiftly regained his confidence. Emerging from his jungle strongholds, he launched a series of surprise attacks on the Nayak's troops whenever opportunities arose. His deep knowledge of the terrain gave him a significant advantage, allowing him to strike unexpectedly and catch the enemy off guard. Utilizing guerrilla tactics, he managed to secure several minor victories, gradually weakening the morale and strength of Chokkanatha’s army.

== Aftermath ==
Faced with continued resistance and the challenges of prolonged guerrilla warfare, Chokkanatha Nayak ultimately decided to abandon his efforts to completely subdue the Sethupathi of Ramnad. he chose instead to withdraw the majority of his forces from the conflict zone. However rather than relinquishing control entirely he adopted a strategic approach by stationing garrisons in key forts across the Marava country. This allowed him to maintain some authority over the region.

== See also ==
- Kingdom of Ramnad
- Chokkanatha Nayak
- Madurai Nayakas
