= Sathyagirisvarar Temple =

Coordinates: 10.2469°N 78.7516°E

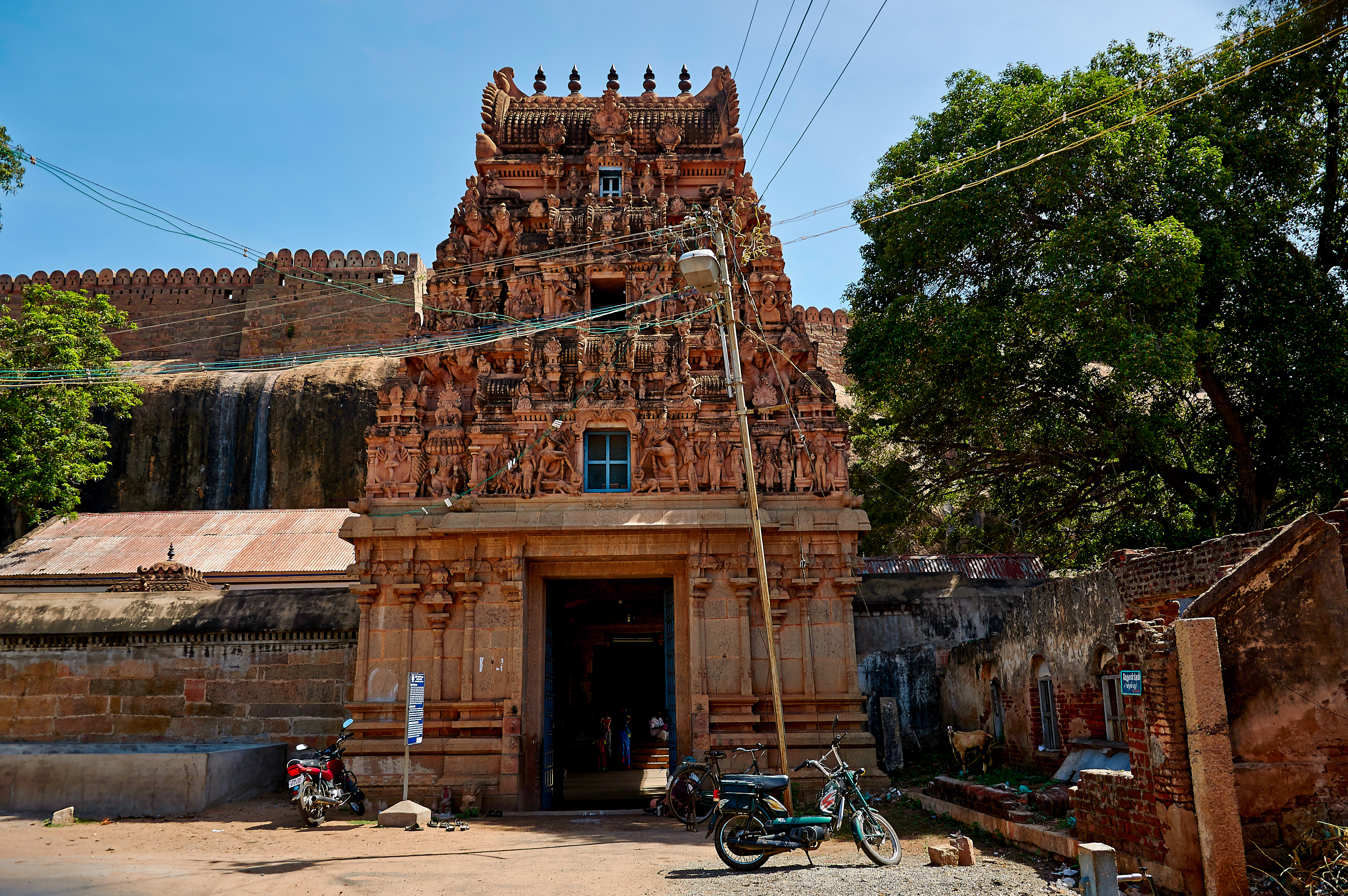

Sathyagirisvarar Temple is a Shiva temple located in Thirumayam, Pudukottai district, Tamil Nadu, India.

== Location ==
This temple is located on Thirumayam Fort at a distance of 19.1 km from Pudukkottai.

== Presiding deity ==
The presiding deity of the temple is known as Sathyagirisvarar. The Goddess is known as Venuvanesvari.

== Structure ==
The temple, constructed by Pallavas on the slope of the hill of Thirumayam, has a compound wall having the other side, a Vishnu temple known as Sathyamurthi Perumal Temple fostering harmony among the Shiva and Vishnu sects. As found in Madurai Meenakshiamman Temple, the shrines of the presiding deity and the Goddess are facing east. One cannot circumambulate the Shiva shrine. One can go around the Shiva and Vishnu temples only.

== Worshipping time ==
The temple is opened for worship from 6.00 a.m. to 11.00 a.m. and 5.00 p.m. to 8.00 p.m.

== Festivals ==
Chaitra festival, Thaipusam, Pournami, Amavasya, Pradosha and other festivals are celebrated in this temple.
