= Nachiyar =

Nachiyar may refer to:

== People ==
- Rajeswari Nachiyar, titular ruler of the estate of Ramnad
- Velu Nachiyar (1730–1796), queen of Sivaganga estate

== Other uses ==
- Nachiyar Koil or Azhagiya Manavala Perumal Temple, Hindu temple in Tamil Nadu, India
- Natchiarkoil, neighbourhood of Thanjavur, Tamil Nadu, India
- Nachiyar Tirumoli, set of 140 verses composed by Andal
- Nachiyarpuram, Indian television series
