= Raghunatha Kilavan =

Ruler of Ramnad

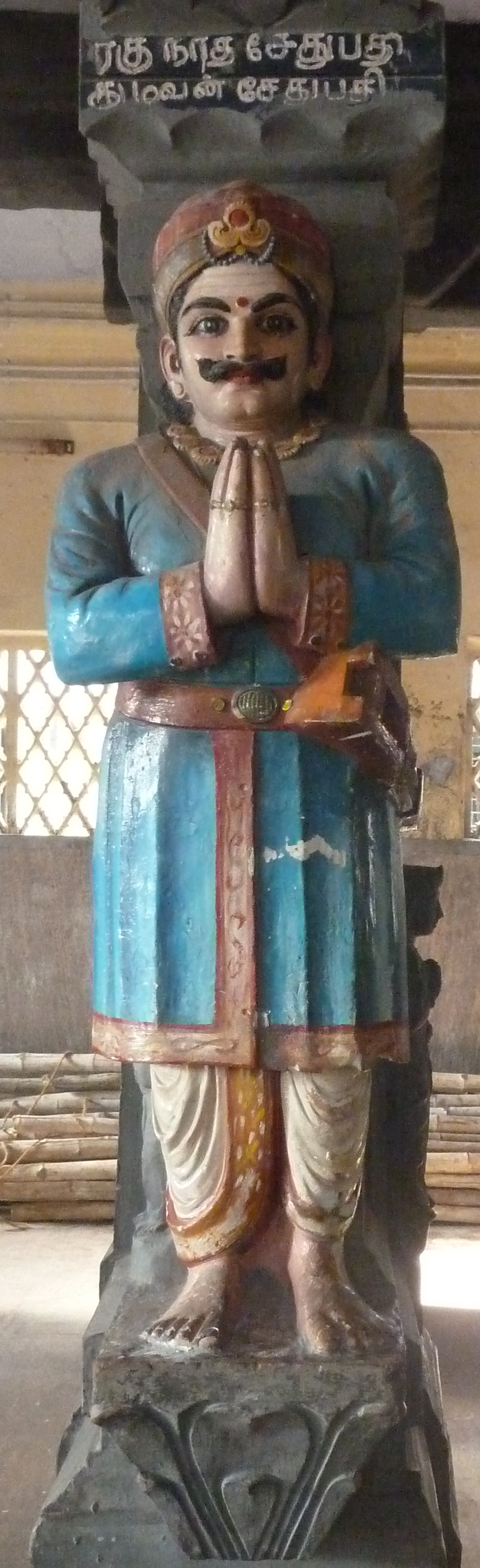
Raghunatha Kilavan

Sriman Hiranyagarbha Ravikula Raja Muthu Vijaya Raghunatha Raja Raghunatha Deva Kilavan Setupati (r. 1671–1710) was the first king of the Ramnad Kingdom which is also known as the "Maravar Kingdom". He ruled from 1673 to 1708 and oversaw the growth of the feudal chieftainship of Ramnad into a powerful "Ramnad Kingdom" which is known as "Maravar Kingdom". He rescued the Nayak of Madurai from the tyranny of Rustam Khan and also successfully campaigned against the King of Thanjavur, who later ceded all his territories. It is recorded in the Sethupati copper plates that he belonged to the Surya kulam and Kashyap gothram.

== Personal life ==
He fell in love with Kathali, a girl from the Kallar caste, later married her and then appointed his brother-in-law as the chief of Pudukottai for the military provided by Raghunatha Raya Tondaiman. Ragunatha Tondaman would later go on to spawn the Thondaman Dynasty of Pudukottai. Also, history states that he had many wives (more than 45) and when Kilavan Sethupathi expired, all of them committed Sati ("Udankattai Eruthal").

== Reign ==
Sethupathis loyalty towards the Nayaks was over with Thirumalai Nayak. Raghunatha Kilavan Sethupathi recaptured all the forts and places from the Nayaks and became an independent ruler.

Raghunatha Kilavan Sethupathi annexed some territories of Madurai Kingdom, Aranthangi, Thirumayam, Piranmalai. He opposed the spread of Christian missionary activities. He liberated the Marava country (area around Rameswaram) from the control of Madurai Nayak. After defeating Rani Mangammal’s army, he declared independent Marava country in 1707. He shifted his headquarters from Bogalur to Ramnad. Kilavan Sethupathi established the Nalucottai palayam (later Sivaganga) and appointed Udaya Thevar as governor. He endowed villages to a temple at Thiruvadanai and Kalaiyar Koil. He constructed a fort around the Ramanathapuram, the capital city. He constructed a dam across the Vaigai.. His close friend was Vallal Seethakathi a Muslim philanthropist.

It was during his reign, that the capital was moved from Bogalur to Ramnad. He was succeeded by his adopted son Vijaya Raghunatha Sethupathi I.

== Death ==
Kilavan Sethupathi ruled for thirty two years (1678 - 1710). He adopted Muthu Vairavanatha Sethupathi and made him the next king. He expired in 1710.

== See also ==
- Ramnad Kingdom
- Sethupathi, title of Raghunatha Kilavan and his descendants
- Maravar, community to which Ramnad / Sethupathi kings belonged
- Thanjavur Nayak kingdom, once and ally and later adversary of Sethupathis
- Madurai Nayak dynasty, once and ally and later adversary of Sethupathis
- Marava War of Succession, war of succession after Vijaya Raghunatha Sethupathi
