= Thirumayam =

- Town Panchayat
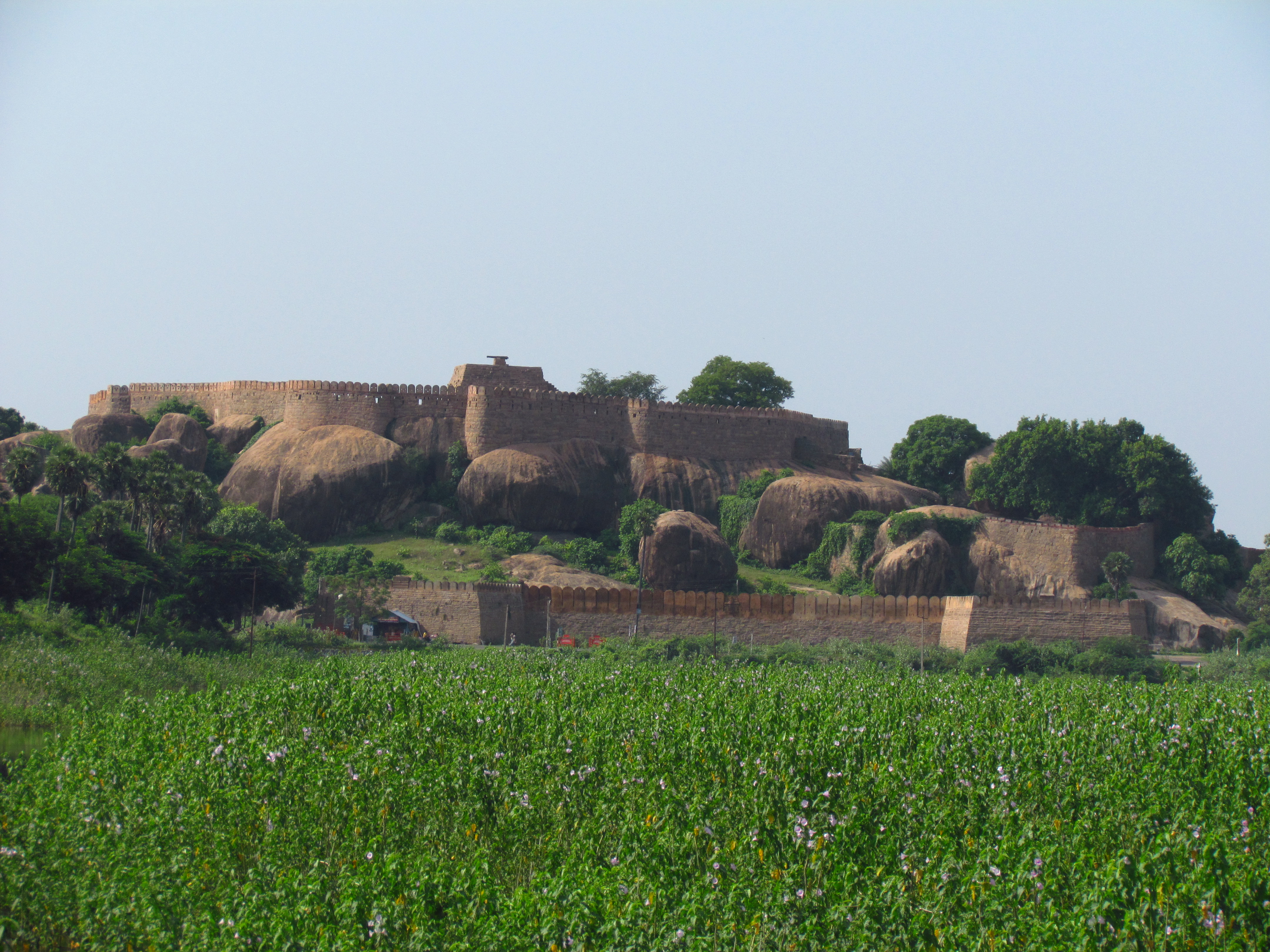
- View of Thirumayam Fort

- Location in Tamil Nadu, India
- Coordinates: 10.2471°N 78.750481°E
- Country: India
- State: Tamil Nadu
- District: Pudukkottai

Languages
  - Official: Tamil
- Time zone: UTC+5:30 (IST)
- Nearest City: Karaikudi, Pudukkottai

Thirumayam is a town located in Pudukkottai district of the Indian state of Tamil Nadu. It is a place of historical importance located about 22 km from the capital city of Pudukkottai as well as from the city of Karaikudi. The noted Indian independence activist Sathyamurthy was born in Thirumayam in 1887.

== Etymology ==
Thirumayam is from the word Thiru-meyyam which means Place of truth in Tamil. The Lord Thirumal is also called by the name of Meyyar. Since he stayed in that village it is called by the name Thirumeyyam. Tiru means 'holy' or 'sacred' and is traditionally used in front of names in many parts of Tamil Nadu.

== Approach ==
Thirumayam, a town panchayat and also the Taluk headquarters of the eponymous Vattam (sub-district), lies 20 km south of Pudukkottai, on the road from that town to Karaikudi. This is actually National Highway NH-210, which connects Tiruchirapalli and Rameshwaram. Thirumayam is the first main junction on this road; the Madurai road takes its diversion from Thirumayam.

Thirumayam is well connected by road and rail. The nearest railhead is at Pudukkottai. Bus facility is available from Pudukkottai, Karaikudi, Thanjavur, Madurai and many other places. The nearest airport connected is at Trichy, 59 km away. Accommodation is also available at nearby Pudukkottai.

Famous freedom fighters Veerapandiya Kattabomman and his brother Umathaiturai hid in a fort at Tirumayam, after their fight against the British during 17th century.

== Attractions ==
Thirumayam known as a picnic spot. The main attractions of the place are the fort, and the Shiva and Thirumal temples.

=== Thirumayam fort ===
Miles before reaching the town, one can see a fort atop a large hill. In past centuries, the fort was much larger than what now obtains; this is affirmed by the fact that the main entrance to the old fort lies about one kilometre south of the present-day fort. This entrance to the old fort still stands, it has a courtyard with pillared corridors and shrines of various deities. There are many sculptures on the pillars.

As one enters the town through the road which connects it with the highway, one finds a small temple dedicated to Bhairava (the Bhairavar-koil - பைரவர் கோயில்). This temple, which faces the main road, is a favourite with vehicle-owners who traditionally halt and pray there for a safe journey. This temple was actually built on the outermost wall of the old fort.

The Thirumayam fort, set in 40 acres (160,000 m^{2}), is of great historical importance. It was built by Kizhavan Sethupathi Vijaya Raghunatha Sethupathi, ruler of Ramanathapuram in 1687 CE. Sethupathi is the name of the ruling dynasty of Ramanathapuram. Another fact of historic interest is that the founder of the princely state of Pudukkottai had served as governor of Thirumayam fort before founding his own kingdom.

=== Temples ===
There are two famous rock-cut shrines Sathyagirisvarar and Sathyamoorthi, one for Shiva and the other for Thirumal, adjacent to each other. These are located at the foot of a hillock on the south side of the town.

The Sathyagirisvarar Temple, Thirumayam, a rock cut Shiva temple is situated on a hill amid the relics of another ancient and ruined fort. Near this temple stands one of the largest rock inscriptions in Tamil Nadu. The inscriptions are of particular interest since they deal with music, a rare subject for inscriptions.

The Sathyamurthi Perumal Temple, a Vishnu temple is located on the foot of the hill; it is much a much-venerated temple and is considered second in importance only to the temple at Srirangam (ஸ்ரீரங்கம்). It contains one of the largest Anantasayi group icons in India. Anantasayi groups have Thirumal reclining on Anantha (Seshanaaga) as the central figure. The Thirumal temple contains an octagonal sacred tank called ‘Satya-pushkarani’ (சத்திய புஷ்கரணி).

=== Jallikattu, a Bull Taming Festival ===
Every year during the time of Tamil New year and Pongal festival, a statewide popular Jallikattu will be going on the areas around Thirumayam. Villages like Neivaasal, Edayathur, Vembanoor will have these bull taming festivals on occasions like maha sivarathri, welcoming tamil months, et cetera.

== Politics ==
Thirumayam assembly constituency is a part of the Sivaganga Lok Sabha constituency.
