= Muthuramalinga Sethupathi II =

Indian zamindar

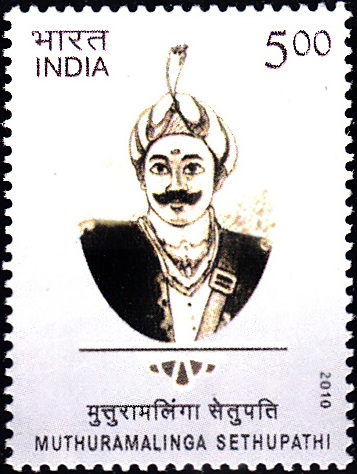
2010 Indian stamp of Muthuramalinga Sethupathi

Muthuramalinga Sethupathi II (1841–1873) was the zamindar of Ramnad estate from 1862 to 1873. He was adopted by his aunt Parvatha Vardhani Ammal Nachiyar, the Rani of Ramnad. He was a patron of arts and music.

Muthuramalinga Sethupathi married Muthathal Nachiyar. The couple had a son, Bhaskara Sethupathi.
