= Iravikkutti Pillai =

Indian military leader

Iraivikutty Pillai

Personal details
- Born: Iraivikutty Pillai Kingdom of Venad
- Parent(s): Keralapuram Raja (father); Easvari Pillai Amma (mother)

Iraivikutty Pillai was the commander-in-chief of Venad Kingdom and one of the eight ministers of Unni Kerala Varma.

== Overview ==
Iravikkutti Pillai belonged to the noble lineage of Valiya Veedu Illam Nair family of Keralapuram in Kalkulam, Venad (kingdom). His father was Keralapuram Raja, and his mother was Easvari Pillai. Kuzhikkottu Paduvilakathu Kochu Narayana Pillai was his guru in warfare.

He became a minister under King Unni Kerala Varma of Venad. During his time, Madurai Thirumala Naickar attacked Venad. Pillai was asked to lead the Venad army, and the attack, which was spearheaded by Velayyan, was repulsed. As a reward, Iravikkutti Pillai was appointed Chief Minister and Commander-in-Chief of Venad. However, Thirumala Naickar sent another army under the leadership of Ramappayyan to attack Venad. The battle at Kaniyamkulam, near Nagercoil, was decisive. Some army commanders within the Venad army, disguised as the Madurai army, attacked Pillai, and eventually, the Madurai army defeated the Venad army through betrayal. Iravikkutti Pillai was killed in the battle.

This incident became the theme for the folk song Villadichan Paattu "Kaniyakulathu Poru" in the local Malayalam dialect. The song describes the life history of Iravikkutti Pillai and his trusted disciple, Kunjirakottu Kaali (Kaaliyan). Kunjakott Kāli Nāyar was the son of a woman named Mathirampally Nangeli Pillai, from the land of Kunchakottu in Venad (present day Keezkulathucherry, Thengapattanam, Kanyakumari district.) At the age of five, Iravikkutty Pillai and his uncle Marthandan Thampi informally adopted the poor boy and took him to their ancestral tharavad, which was an Ammaveedu (one of the ancestral bungalows built by the Venad/Travancore kings for their wives and their close relatives).

Iravikutty Pillai cemetery was near his ancestral house. There is also have Bhadra kali temple which is called as Padathalavan Bhadrakali Temple. His reputed horse was also cremated near his cemetery opposite the temple.
