= Bogalur block =

Bogalur block is a revenue block in the Ramanathapuram district of Tamil Nadu, India. It has a total of 26 panchayat villages.

Bogalur is the main panchayath Union for the surrounding villages.

== Educational institutions ==
- Dheeniya Aided Ps, T.Karungulam
- Gt. Hs, Kamankottai
- Gt. Hs, Manjur
- Gt. Hss, Sathirakudi
- Harijan Aided Ps, Muthuvayal (Owner-Sethuraman)
- Idar Theertha Amman Ps, Theeya
- Model Nur&Pri Scl, Sathirakudi
- N.M.S. S.V. Hs, Arasadivandal
- N.M.S.Pandianar Ps, Arasadivan
- Noorullah Muslim Ps,
- Pums, A.Puthur
- Pums, K.Valasai
- Pums, Manjakkollai
- Pums, Mennandhi
- Pums, Mudalur
- Pums, Muthuvayal
- Pums, Pottithatti
- Pums, S.Kodikulam
- Pums, Sevvoor
- Pums, Veeravanoor
- Pups, Anaikudi
- Pups, Ariyakudi
- Pups, Bogalur
- Pups, Chinna Nagachi
- Pups, Ettivayal
- Pups, Ilanthaikulam,
- Pups, K. Karungulam
- Pups, Kakkanendal
- Pups, Kamankottai
- Pups, Karuthanendal
- Pups, Kavuthakudi
- Pups, Keelakkottai
- Pups, Keelambal
- Pups, Manjur
- Pups, Manthivalasai
- Pups, Mavilangai
- Pups, Meyyanendal
- Pups, Pandikanmai
- Pups, Poovalathur
- Pass nursery and primary school, Bogalur
- Pups, Sathirakudi
- Pups, Semanoor (North)
- Pups, Semanoor (South)
- Pups, Seyyalur
- Pups, Theivendranallur
- Pups, Thenchiyendal
- Pups, Thennavanur
- Pups, Thiruvadi
- Pups, Thurathiyendal
- Pups, Urathur
- Pups, Vairavanendal-North
- Pups, Vairavanendal-South
- Pups, Vananganendal
- Rcps, A. Puthur (Muthuchellapuram
- Telc Ps, Mudalur
- Vasan Matric Scl, Sathirakudi
- RK Samy matric school, Seyyalur
- Rk Samy teacher training institute, Seyyalur
- Meenakshi matric school, Chinna Ithampadal
