= Sathyamurthi Perumal Temple, Thirumayam =

Perumal temple in Pudukkottai district, Tamil Nadu, India

Sathyamurthi Perumal Temple
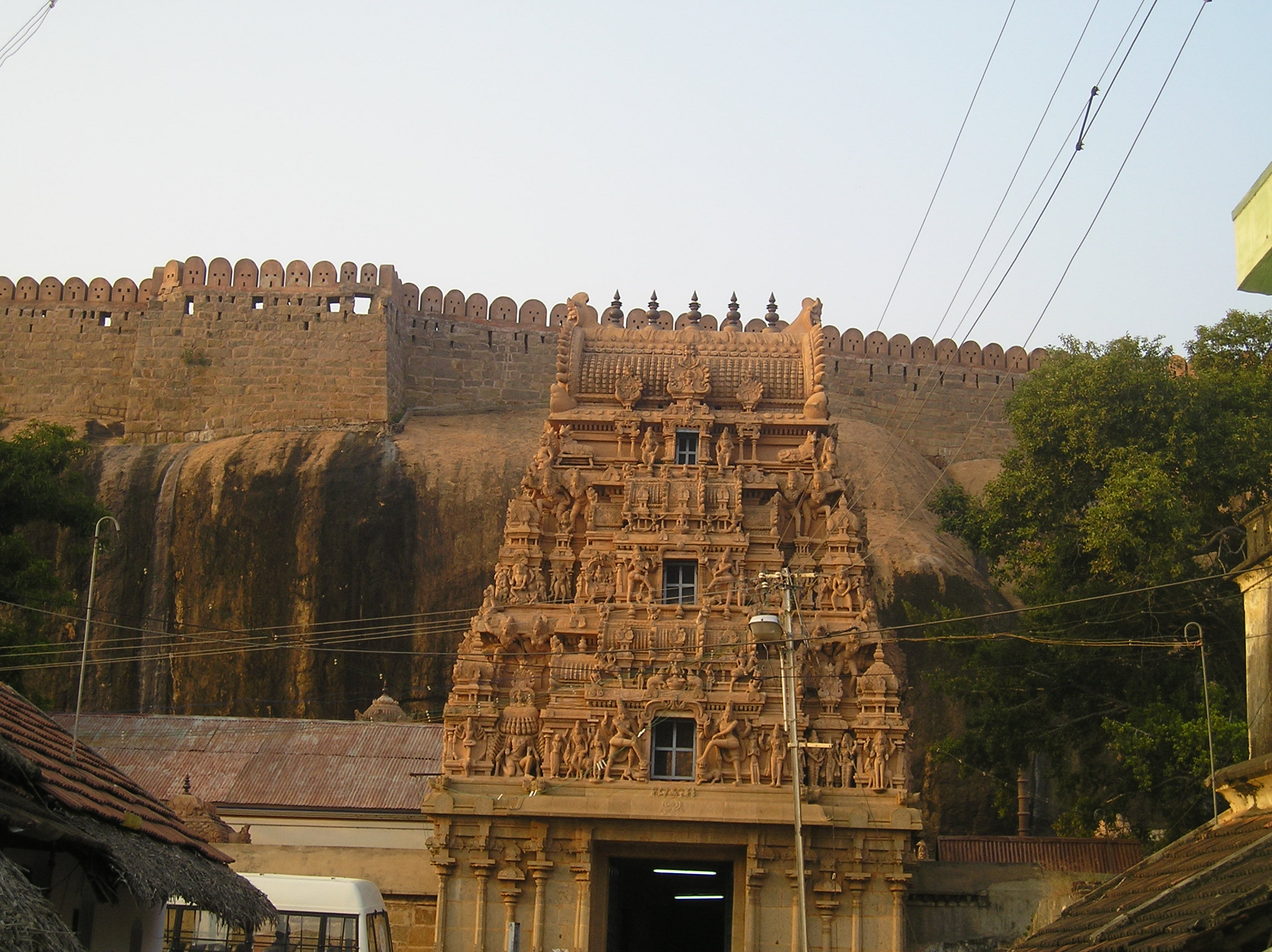

- Location in Tamil Nadu

Religion
- Affiliation: Hinduism
- District: pudukottai
- Deity: Sathyamurthy Perumal (Vishnu); Ujeevana Thayar (Lakshmi)

Location
- Location: Tamil Nadu, India
- State: Tamil Nadu
- Country: India
- Interactive map of Sathyamurthi Perumal Temple
- Coordinates: 10.246945°N 78.751996°E

Architecture
- Type: Dravidian architecture, rock-cut architecture

Sathyamurthi Perumal Temple in Thirumayam, a panchayat town in the South Indian state of Tamil Nadu, is dedicated to the Hindu god Vishnu. Constructed in the Dravidian style of architecture, the temple is glorified in the Nalayira Divya Prabandham, the early medieval Tamil canon of the Alvar saints from the 6th–9th centuries CE. It is one of the 108 Divya Desams dedicated to Vishnu, who is worshipped as Sathyamurthi Perumal and his consort Lakshmi as Ujeevana Thayar.

The temple is believed to have been built during the 9th century by the Pallavas. A granite wall surrounds the temple, enclosing all its shrines. The temple has a five-tiered rajagopuram, the gateway tower and is behind a fort built during the 15th century. The temple tank is located inside the premises.

The temple is maintained and administered by the Archaeological Survey of India as a protected monument. The temple follows the Tenkalai tradition of worship. Four daily rituals and many yearly festivals are held at the temple, of which the car festival during the Tamil month of Vaikasi (April - May), Krishna Jayanti during Avani (August - September) and Adi Puram during July - August being the most prominent.

== Legend ==
The Brahmanda Purana mentions the legend included in the temple's regional legend. Once, Adishesha, the serpent-mount of Vishnu, wanted to convert his guna (quality) from tamas (darkness) to satvik (purity). He performed a penance at this place via the netherworld in a path, which went on to become the river Pamapar. Vishnu appeared to him in the form of Hayagriva and granted him a boon. Chandra also performed penance at this place. Vishnu was pleased by his devotion and appeared to him in the form of Vamana.

As per another legend, a sage named Satya performed penance at this place. Pleased by his devotion, Vishnu granted him a boon that he would appear to the sage whenever he wished. The sage had no wish to move away from river where he was performing the penance. Vishnu converted the river to a Pushkarani, the rock to Meyyam hill and banyan tree to Asvatta tree. The sage performed penance again and wished salvation. Vishnu told him that he would attain salvation at the same time as king Pururava. Vishnu appeared in the form of a boar and created havoc in the kingdom of Pururava. The king chased the boar to the forest where the sage was performing penance. The sage was disturbed and opened the eyes, while the king saw the boar disappeared. Vishnu appeared to grant a vision to both of them. He granted salvation to the sage and directed the king to build a temple at this place, which went on to become the Satyamurthi Perumal temple.

== History ==
Historians believe that the temple was built during the 9th century CE by the Pallavas. M.A. Dhaky places the period to be the seventh decade of the 9th century CE. He has also compared the images of the temple to that of Vijayalaya Choleeswaram in Narthamalai, built by Muttaraiyar kings during the same period. Another view is that the temple to have been built by a vassal of Pallavas following the Rock-cut architecture of Group of Monuments at Mahabalipuram built by Mahendravarman I (590-630 CE) and his son Narasimhavarman I. An inscription in the temple indicates contributions to the temple by Perumbidugu Perumdevi, mother of Sattan Maran, a contemporary and vassal of Pallava king Nandivarman II (731-796 CE).

The fort, the Shiva and Vishnu temples are the tourist attractions. The fort played an important role in the history of Thondaiman rulers of Pudukottai and the British. The 40-acre fort was built by Vijaya Ragunatha Sethupathi of Ramanathapuram in 1687 CE. On the hill, there is a rock-cut Shiva temple with inscriptions on music. There are relics of another fort. At the foot of the hill are the Shiva and Vishnu temples. It was in this fort that the brother of Kattabomman, Oomathurai was ensnared and imprisoned. An old armor used by him is exhibited here.

== Architecture ==
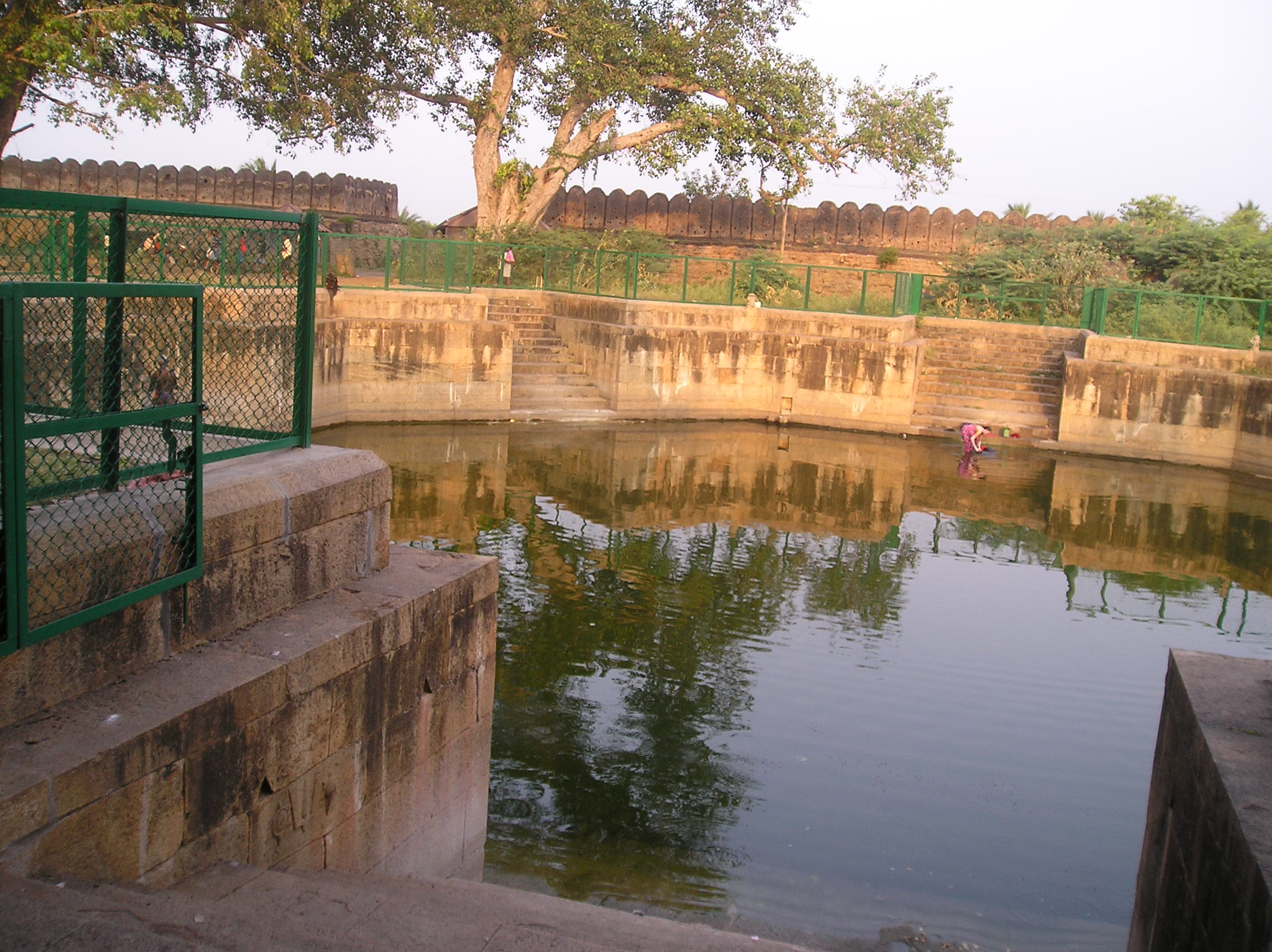
The Temple tank of Thirumayam temple

The temple is located in Thirumayam, a village in the Madurai - Pudukottai road, 15 km (9.3 mi) from the temple. The presiding deity is called Sathyamurthi Perumal. The temple is old and large, and striking in appearance. The main statue of Sathyamurthi Perumal approximately seven feet in height, is standing on a rock, along with his wives. In the next Sannidhanam (sanctum), Mahavishnu's sculpture is in sleeping position, called ari thuyil in Tamil, sleeping with a sense of knowing what is going on at present. Sculptures of Mahavishnu in this position can be viewed in many temples, although this is one of the largest examples. There are many other sannidhis in the temple. All the statues are sculptured beautifully. It is this, the reclining form of Vishnu christened Azhagiya Neyyar (the Deity who enchants all his devotees with his beauty), that is also the largest sculpture of Anantasayi (Vishnu in reclining pose) in India. It is a natural cavern which has been rockcut to have various images. The hall preceding the sanctum, the Ardha mandapa is rectangular in shape, similar to the sanctum. The wall behind the presiding deity has images of Garuda, Chitragupta, Markandeya, Brahma, the devas, the vasus, and the kinnaras.

The temple is adjacent to the Sathyagiriswara Sivan temple, located in the same complex. The temple is maintained and administered by the Archaeological Survey of India as a ticketed monument.

== Religious significance, Religious practices and festival ==
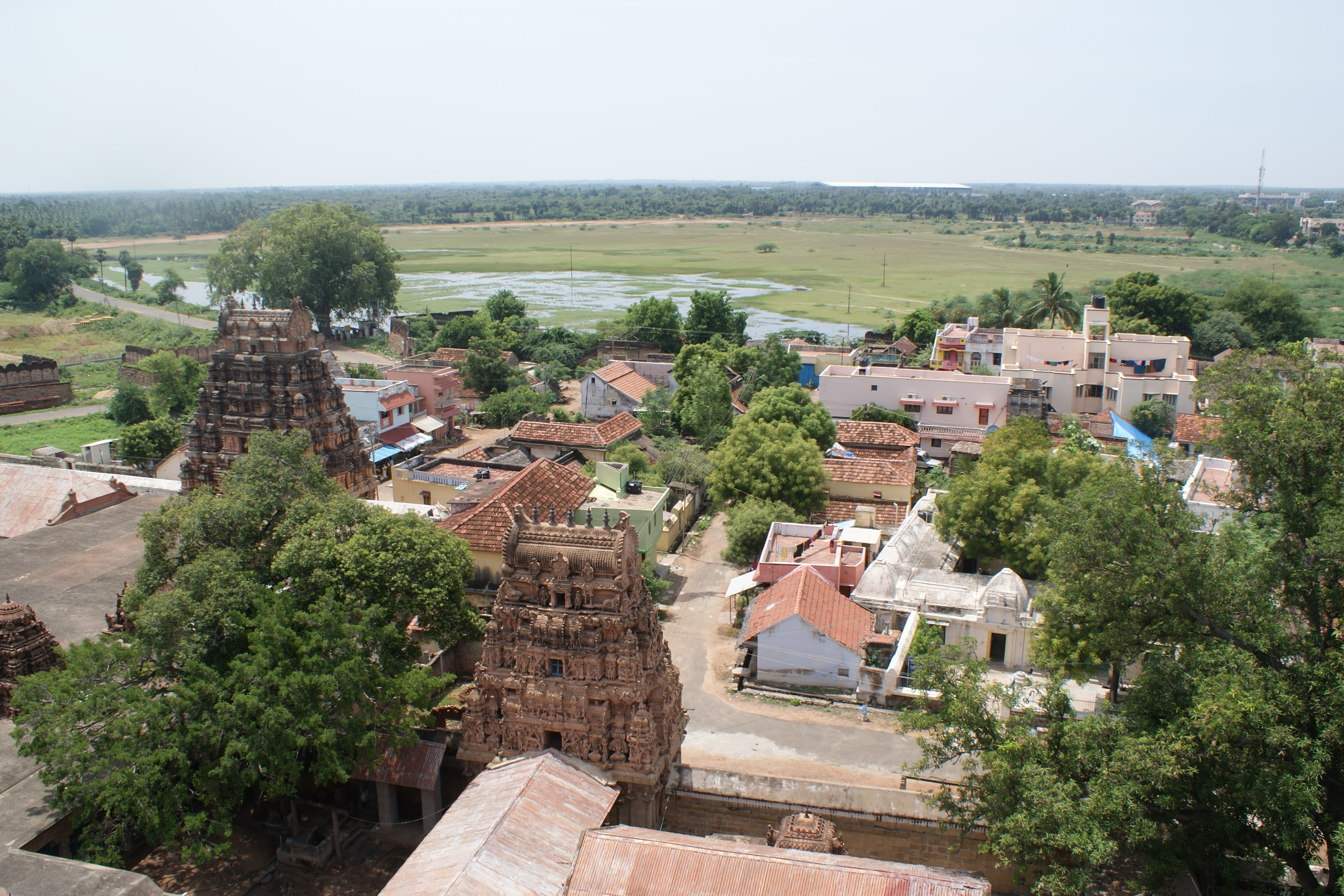
The view of the temple as seen from Thirumayam Fort

Sathyamurthi Perumal temple is revered in Nalayira Divya Prabhandam, the 7th–9th century Vaishnava canon, by Thirumangai Alvar. The temple is classified as a Divya Desam, one of the 108 Vishnu temples that are mentioned in the book. During the 18th and 19th centuries, the temple finds mention in several works like 108 Tirupathi Anthathi by Divya Kavi Pillai Perumal Aiyangar. The image of the reclining deity is bigger than the Ranganatha image in Srirangam temple. The Adishesha in the temple is believed to as a protecting force. Once it emanated fumes on the attacking asuras who wanted to destroy it. Following the legend, the image is sculpted in such a way showing flames emanating from it.

The temple follows the traditions of the Tenkalai sect of the Vaishnava tradition and follows vaikhānasāgama. In modern times, the temple priests perform the pooja (rituals) during festivals and on a daily basis. As at other Vishnu temples of Tamil Nadu, the priests belong to the Vaishnavaite community, from the Brahmin class. Four daily rituals are performed at various times of the day and many yearly festivals are held at the temple, of which the car festival during the Tamil month of Vaikasi (April - May), Krishna Jayanti during Avani (August - September) and Adi Puram during July - August being the most prominent. There are weekly, monthly and fortnightly rituals performed in the temple.
