= Ramaiyan =

Ramapaiyan, Ramaiyan, Ramappaiyen
- Born: 17th century Madurai
- Died: 1639–1648; Tamil Nadu
- Occupation: Military general

Ramaiyan, Ramayyan or Ramappaiyyan was a general who served under the Madurai Nayak king Tirumala Nayaka. He is the subject of the Tamil ballad Ramayyan Ammanai.

== Personal life ==
Ramaiyan was a Tamil Brahmin soldier who served in the army of Thirumalai Nayak. He acquired fame for his prowess as a swordsman and gradually rose to become an important general in the Nayak's army.

== War against Mysore ==
Ramaiyan's first major battle was against Harasura Nandi Raja, the general of the Mysore kingdom. In 1633, Harasura invaded the Nayak kingdom and marched as far as Dindigul but was repulsed by Ramaiyan and Ranganna Nayak, the polygar of Kannivadi. Nelson and Mr. Rangachari provide a detailed narrative of the events wherein the latter pushed their success further by besieging the capital of Mysore. The account highlights the recall of Ramaiyan and his subsequent disobedience, which, despite initial concerns, did not ultimately work against him. The Dalavay returned triumphant, receiving great honors from Tirumala Nayaka. The inscription of Srimukha in 1633, documenting his land donation to the local temple and referring to him as the minister of Tirumala Nayaka, likely followed this victorious campaign against Mysore.

== Invasion of Travancore ==
Ramaiyan also participated in the Nayak invasion of Travancore in 1634-35.

== War against Ramnad ==
In 1639, Tambi, an illegitimate brother of the Sethupathi Cadaikkan and a contender for the throne rebelled against the king. Thirumalai supported the rebel and sent a huge army under the leadership of Ramaiyan.

Ramaiyan fought the Ramnad troops led by the Sethupathi's son-in-law Vanni in the Maravar country. The war lasted five months and resulted in Nayak's victory. The Sethupathi, himself, fled to Pamban Island but was captured and taken prisoner.

== War against Bijapur Sultanate ==
Ramaiyan/Ramappaiyen made an alliance with Nayak of ikkeri fought against Randaula Khan and Sriranga III from the side of Vijayanagar emperor Venkata III defeated them at Bangalore. and returned to Madura where he get several rewards for his success.

== Ramayyan Ammanai ==
Ramaiyan's exploits in the 1639 war were the subject of a popular Tamil ballad, Ramayyan Ammanai. In the ballad, Cadaikkan, initially, ridicules Ramaiyan

Does he not know the might of Cadaikkan?
Does he not know what will happen?
Who can defeat me?
I am not Cadaikkan and I am not a brave man if I do not pluck out the eyes of the Brahmin who has come
I am not Cadaikkan and I am a coward
If I do not tie a coconut to his tuft and do not break it into pieces
while the great world witnesses

On completion of the war, Ramaiyan sends the following message to Thirumalai Nayak:

I made those who speak ill of you surrender at the entrance of Madurai.
Did not the kings of the earth obey you and extend their hands with taxes?

== Death ==
Ramaiyan died shortly after his victory against Ramnad. His death is believed to have taken place sometime between 1639 and 1648.
