= Rajeswari Nachiyar =

Rani of Ramnad

Sethupathi Rani R Brahma Krishna Raja Rajeswari Nachiyar is the titular ruler of the estate of Ramnad. She is the only daughter of Ramanatha Sethupathi.

== Succession ==
Rajeswari Nachiyar assumed the hereditary title of the ruler of Ramnad on the death of her father Ramanatha Sethupathi in 1979. Though she scarcely wields any real authority, she is the managing trustee of a number of temples and the palaces owned by the family.

== Notes ==
| Preceded by Ramanatha Sethupathi | Rani of Ramnad; 1979–present | Incumbent |
