= Raja Rajeswara Sethupathi =

Raja of Ramnad (1889–1929)

Raja Rajeswara Sethupathi (Tamil: ராஜ ராஜேஸ்வர சேதுபதி) or Muthuramalinga Sethupathy (3 June 1889 – 1929) was the Raja of Ramnad from 1903 to 1929.

== Early life and education ==
Raja Rajeswara Sethupathi was the son of Bhaskara Sethupathy and the father of politician Shanmugha Rajeswara Sethupathi, former MP Rajkumar Kasinatha Durai R(Ilaya Mannar of Ramnad) Chidhambaranadha Durai & Vijayaraghunadha Durai. He was educated from Madura College and ascended the throne in 1903. While in school, he was a classmate of Mudaliyar Padikara Mudali Nanayakkara Rajawasala Appuhamilage Don Arthur de Silva Wijesinghe Siriwardena of Kalutara. His palace inspired the Mudaliyar to construct the Richmond Castle, Kalutara. Raja Rajeswara Sethupathi participated in the Delhi Durbar of 1911 and served as a member of the Madras Legislative Council representing Southern Landholders.

He was also a free mason and contributed to the Freemasons hall in Chennai.He was responsible for recovering the wealth which was nearly lost by his philanthropic father.He was also in the railway board.

| Preceded by Bhaskara Sethupathy | Raja of Ramnad; 1903–1929 | Succeeded by Shanmugha Rajeswara Sethupathi |
