= Shanmugha Rajeswara Sethupathi =

Indian politician

His Highness Raja Shanmugha Rajeswara Sethupathi

Minister of Public Works (Madras state)
- In office 13 September 1953 – 13 March 1957
- Premier: C. Rajagopalachari, K. Kamaraj
- Preceded by: N. Ranga Reddi
- Succeeded by: P. Kakkan

Minister of House Rent Control (Madras state)
- In office 10 April 1952 – 13 September 1953
- Premier: C. Rajagopalachari
- Preceded by: None

Personal details
- Born: 9 November 1909 Ramanathapuram, Madura District, Madras Presidency, British India
- Died: 4 March 1967 (aged 57) Madras, India
- Party: Justice Party (1929-1946); Indian National Congress (1946-1967)
- Children: Dasarathan Sethupathi, Rajkumar Sethupathi, Latha
- Education: Madras Law College

Shanmugha Rajeswara Sethupathi
Cricket information
- Role: Batsman

Domestic team information
- Years: Team
- 1941/42–1943/44: Madras

Career statistics
Competition	First-class
Matches	4
Runs scored	129
Batting average	21.50
100s/50s	0/0
Top score	31*
Catches/stumpings	0/–
- Source: Cricinfo, 1 March 2022

Shanmugha Rajeswara Sethupathi (9 November 1909 – 4 March 1967) or Naganatha Sethupathi was an Indian politician of the Justice Party and later, the Indian National Congress and head of the zamindari of Ramnad or Ramnad kingdom from 1929 to 1967. He was a member of the Madras Legislative Assembly from 1951 to 1967 and served as a minister in C. Rajagopalachari and K. Kamaraj's cabinets. He was popular as the main political opponent of U. Muthuramalingam Thevar.

Sethupathi had a passionate liking for horses and was a fine sportsman. He represented the Madras cricket team in four first-class matches.

== Early life ==
Shanmugha Rajeswara Sethupathi was born to Raja Rajeswara Sethupathi or Muthuramalinga Sethupathi who ruled the estate of Ramnad on 9 November 1909. Shanmugha Rajeswara Sethupathi had an English education and graduated in law. He succeeded to the throne on the death of his father in 1929.

As soon as Shanmugha took over the administration of the estate, the land became embroiled in a number of disputes and lengthy court cases. Between 1935 and 1945, the estate was administered by the Court of Wards.

== Politics ==
=== Electoral records ===
He served as the Member of the Legislative Assembly of Tamil Nadu. He was elected to the Tamil Nadu legislative assembly as an Indian National Congress candidate from Ramanathapuram constituency in 1952 and 1962 elections and as an Independent candidate in 1957 election.

=== Justice Party ===
Shanmugha Rajeswara Sethupathi joined politics at an early age. He was elected to the Madras Legislative Council as a candidate of the Justice Party and served as a member of the Madras Legislative Council until 1937 when he lost to Pasumpon Muthuramalingam Thevar of the Indian National Congress. During his period of service with the Justice Party, he served in the Economic Depression Enquiry Committee which enquired into the causes and impact of the Great Depression in Madras Presidency.

=== Indian National Congress ===
Shanmugha Rajeswara joined the Indian National Congress in 1946 and was elected again to the Madras Legislative Council as an Indian National Congress candidate. He stood in the 1951 elections from Ramanathapuram assembly constituency and was elected to the Madras Legislative Assembly. He served as the Minister of House Rent Control from 10 April 1952 to 13 September 1953 and as the Minister of Public Works from 13 September 1953 to 31 March 1957.

== Other interests ==
Shanmugha Rajeswara Sethupathi had a passionate liking for horses. He owned a stable of over 50 horses in Calcutta. He also owned an extensive car collection including Rolls Royces and Bentleys. The Raja owned extensive land in different parts of Madras city. Hotel Woodlands is located on the exact spot where the Raja's official residence in the city had earlier stood. The Shanmugha Sethupathi Cup for horse racing has been instituted in his memory.

Shanmugha Rajeswara Sethupathi was also a fine cricketer. He played four first class matches during the 1941/42 and 1943/44 seasons for the Madras cricket team scoring 129 runs at an average of 21.50. He also played for the Indians against the Europeans.

== Death ==
Shanmugha Rajeswara Sethupathi died on 4 March 1967 and was succeeded as the titular Raja of Ramnad by his son.

Preceded by Raja Rajeswara Sethupathi	Raja of Ramnad; 1929–1967	Succeeded by Ramanatha Sethupathi
Preceded by	Member of Madras Legislative Council; 1930–1937	Succeeded by
Preceded by	Member of Madras Legislative Assembly; 1946–1967	Succeeded by T. Thangappan
Preceded by None	Minister of House Rent Control (Madras state); 1952–1953	Succeeded by
Preceded by N. Ranga Reddi	Minister of Public Works (Madras state); 1953–1957	Succeeded by P. Kakkan
