= Vijaya Raghunatha Sethupathi I =

King of Ramanathapuram

Vijayaraghunatha Sethupathi I
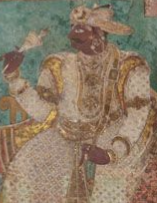
- 18th century mural of Vijayaraghunatha Sethupathi I

1st Sethupathi of Ramnad
- Reign: 1713–1725
- Predecessor: Muthu Vairavanatha Sethupathi I
- Successor: Sundaresvara Raghunatha Sethupathi
- Born: Ramnad, Madurai Nayak Kingdom
- Died: 1725; Ramnad, Madurai Nayak Kingdom
- House: Sethupathi
- Religion: Hinduism

Vijayaraghunatha Sethupathi I (died 1725) ruled from 1713 to 1725 the "Ramnad Kingdom". He was an adopted son of Raghunatha Kilavan, the founder of the "Ramnad Kingdom". Sethupathi was the title granted by Thanjavur Nayaks to his adoptive father Raghunatha Kilavan, and this title was retained by his descendants.

== Personal life ==
According to a 1713 letter written by Christian missionary Martin, Vijayaraghunatha Sethupathi was the second adoptive son of Raghunatha Kilavan, the founder of the kingdom. Martin writes

Vairavanatha Deva is master of a good part of Marava. All the kingdom belonged to him by right, for he is the elder; but he gave sovereignty over it to his younger brother, who, he thought had more talent for government than he

Vijayaraghunatha Sethupathi had two daughters: Sivagami Nachiar and Rajeswari Nachiar. The story is that both his daughters fell in love with the same man and the king got them both married to him. He also gave him a small portion of his kingdom to take care of.

== Reign ==
Vijayaraghunatha Sethupathi became a king after his adoptive father Raghunatha Kilavan chose him as heir apparent on his death bed. Vijayaraghunatha was a ruler of considerable ability. The kingdom was on the brink of a famine when he ascended the throne but he handled the situation appreciably well. He set up his base in the fortress of Aranthangi. With the assistance of French engineers he built a fort near Gundar river in Kamudhi in present day Ramanathapuram district. Being a pious Hindu, Vijayaraghunatha frequently visited the temple at Rameswaram and made donations.

Vijayaraghunatha was initially favourable in his attitude towards Christians. He even made lavish donations for the construction of a church in Aranthangi in 1711. However, his attitude changed during a visit to Rameswaran in 1714-15, when his brother-in-law, Tiruvaluvanathan, whom he had appointed to govern the state in his absence, visited the church in Aranthangi and participated in Christian ceremonies. This, combined with tales of alleged atrocities of Christian missionaries, turned Vijayaraghunatha against them. He gave orders to exterminate Christianity from the kingdom and prohibited proselytising. There was a ferry service between Ramnathapuram and Rameshwaram. This ferry ride was free of cost for pilgrims and this decree was given by the king. His son-in-law (Dhandapani Thevar) decided to charge a very small fare for this ferry from pilgrims. Many pilgrims were turned away because they weren't able to afford the ferry which was not free anymore. One such determined pilgrim decided to directly approach the king regarding this matter. This is when it comes to the king's notice that the ferry which is supposed to be free was not free anymore. The king flew into a fit of rage and had his own son-in-law arrested. Meanwhile the king's two daughters, once they heard of this, decided to come and beg their father to let their husband go. The king, however, had already passed a death sentence on his son-in-law. While the women were on their way to meet their father, they get the news that their husband had been beheaded. They kill themselves in that very same spot. The place where the first daughter died is called Akkamadam and where his second daughter died is called Thangachimadam.

Vijayaraghunatha's rival to win the throne, Bhavani Shankar, broke into an open revolt in 1720 and along with Raja of Pudukkottai and the Thanjavur Maratha ruler invaded Aranthangi. While defending the city, Vijayaraghunatha fell victim to plague. His death triggered a civil war in the kingdom, at the end of which the kingdom was partitioned into three and lost most of its power and territory.

== Gallery ==
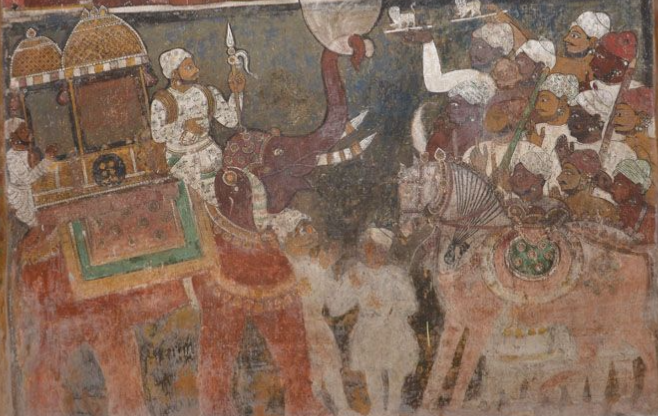
Elephant and Horse guards of Ramnad

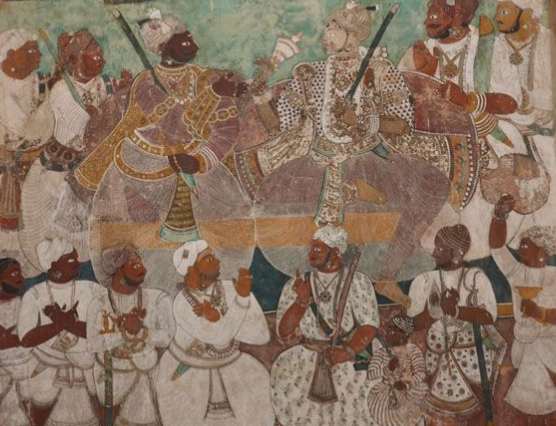
Court of Vijaya Raghunatha Sethupathi I

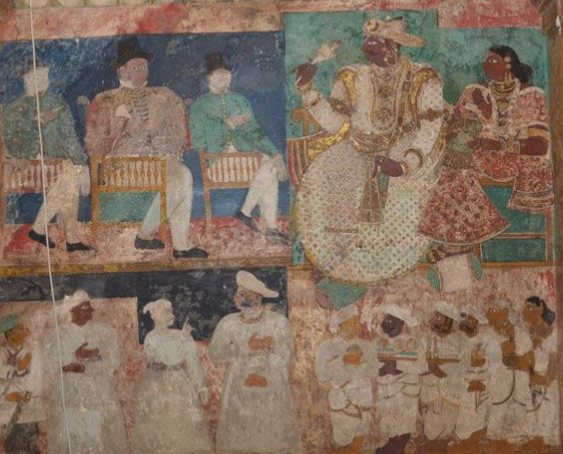
Vijaya Raghunatha Sethupathi I meeting Dutch officers

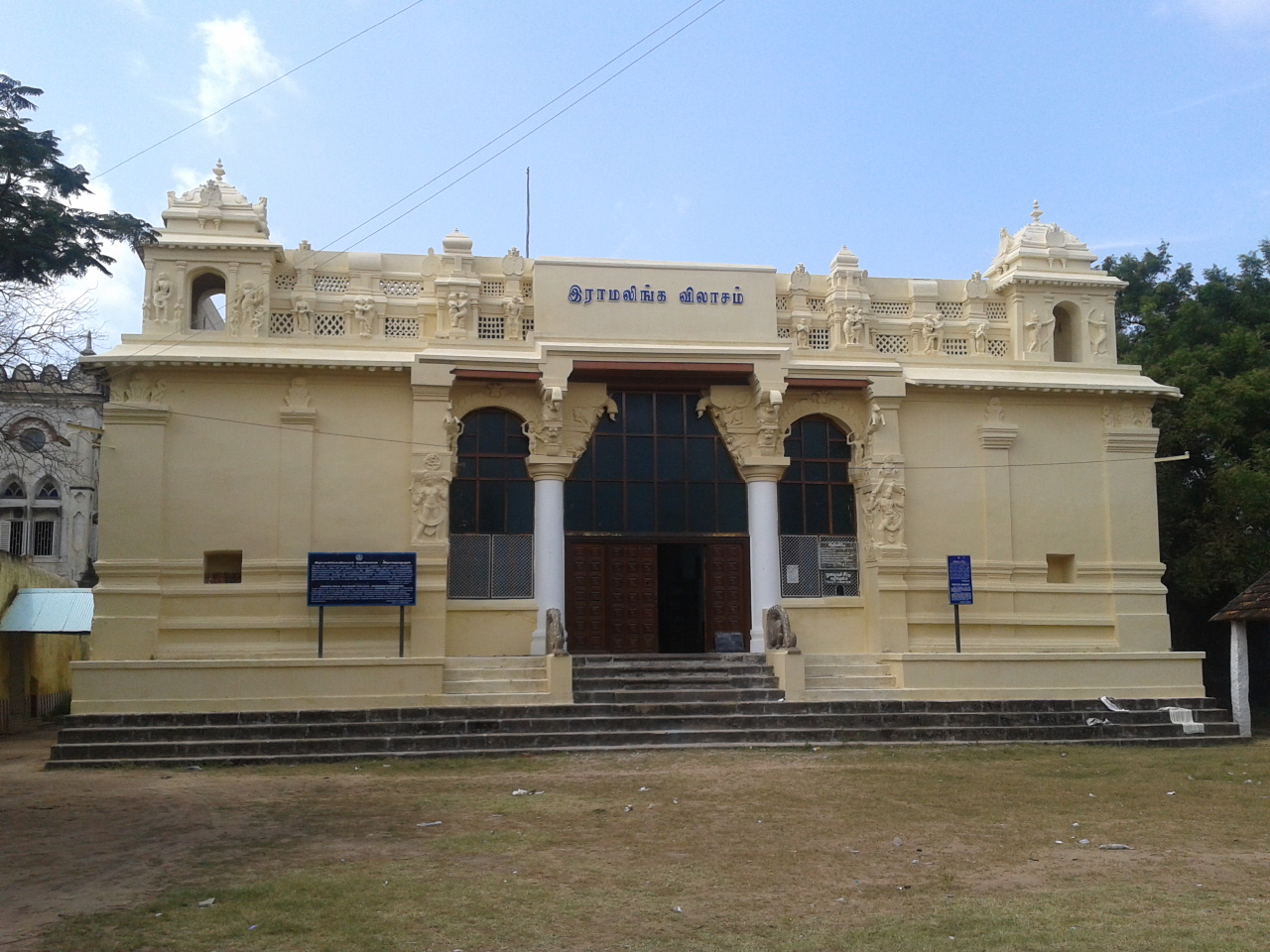
Entrance of the Ramand Palace

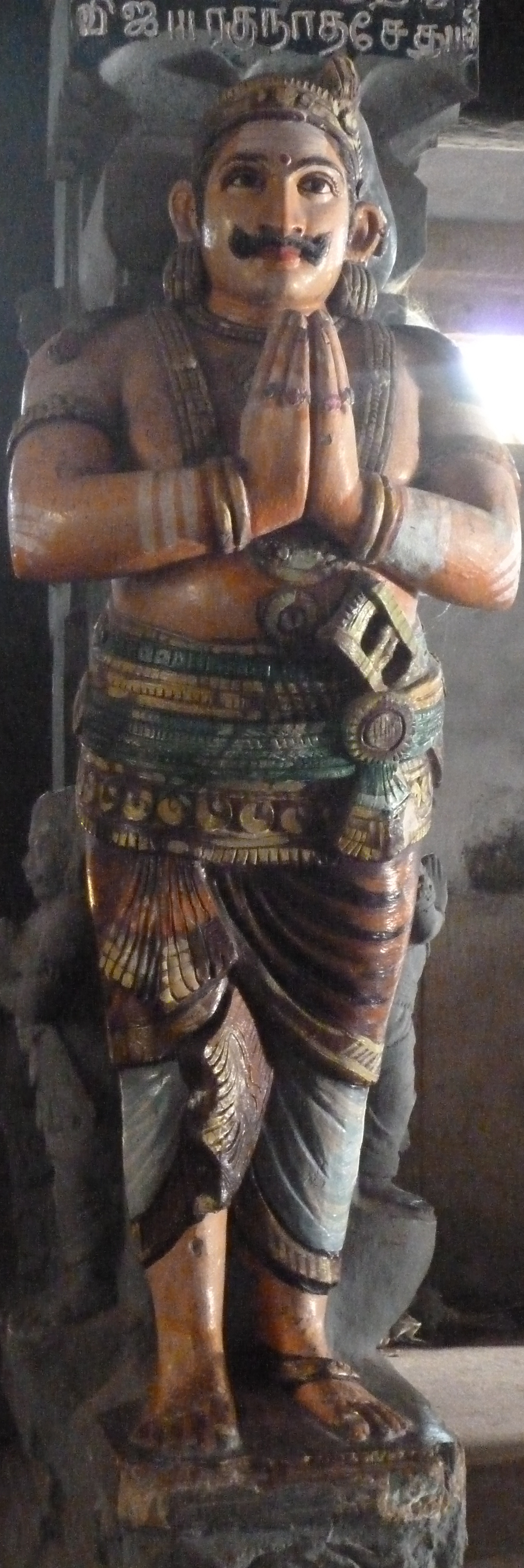
Sculpture of Vijaya Raghunatha Sethupathi

== See also ==
- Ramnad Kingdom
- Sethupathi, title of Raghunatha Kilavan and his descendants
- Maravar, community to which Ramnad / Sethupathi kings belonged
- Thanjavur Nayak kingdom, once and ally and later adversary of Sethupathis
- Madurai Nayak dynasty, once and ally and later adversary of Sethupathis
- Marava War of Succession, war of succession after Vijaya Raghunatha Sethupathi
