= Ramanatha Sethupathi =

Raja Ramnad

Ramanatha Sethupathy (died 1979) was the last Raja titleholder of Ramnad from 1967 to 1979. He was the next successor of the throne from his father, Shanmugha Rajeswara Sethupathi.

His descendants are settled in various fields including cardio thoracic medicine and engineering in the Indian Army and Indian Airforce respectively.

| Preceded by Shanmugha Rajeswara Sethupathi | Raja of Ramnad; 1967–1979 | Succeeded by Rajeswari Nachiyar |
