= Bhaskara Sethupathi =

Raja of Ramnad

Bhaskara Sethupathy
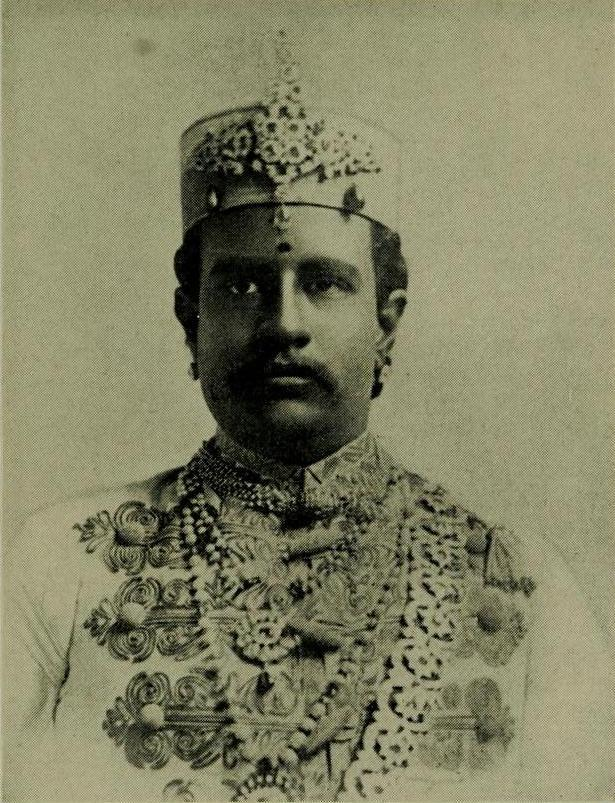
- Born: 1868
- Died: 1903 (aged 34–35)
- Occupation: Raja of Ramnad

Bhaskara Sethupathy ( Muthuvijaya Raghunatha Bhaskara; 3 November 1868 – 27 December 1903) was a Zamindar of Ramnad. He became the recognised proprietor of the Ramnad estate after his father's death in 1873 until 1895. From 1895, he assumed Managership of Rameswaram until 1901.

He was regarded as a pious, brilliant and generous ruler by his supporters. His supporters believed that he would regain control of Ramnad estate some day. He died suddenly at the age of 35 in 1903.

== Sponsorship of Swami Vivekananda for Parliament of the World's Religions ==
In 1892, Swami Vivekananda stayed with Bhaskara when he visited Madurai and he sponsored Vivekananda's visit to Parliament of the World's Religions held in Chicago. During his stay, Swami Vivekananda had extensive discussions on Hindu philosophy with eminent scholars like Mahavidwan R. Raghava Iyengar.

== Kamudi temple case against Nadars ==
Being the hereditary of Minakshi Sundareswara Temple in Kamuthi, he filed a lawsuit against fifteen Nadars on 14 May 1897 who had entered forcefully into the temple despite traditional customs which discouraged them. He sought compensation for the purification of the temple and establish that Nadars never have the right to enter temple. However, the Nadars were eventually allowed to enter temples built by higher communities due to new legislations and movements.

== In popular culture ==
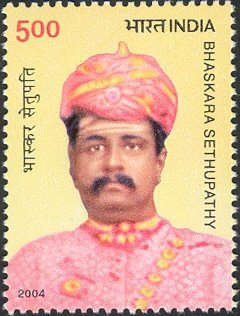
Bhaskara Sethupathy Stamp of India - 2004

- Bhaskara Sethupathy was portrayed by Malayalam actor Mammootty in the 1998 film Swami Vivekananda.

Preceded by	Raja of Ramnad; 1873–1903	Succeeded by Raja Rajeswara Sethupathi
