= Maravar =

Tamil community in Tamil Nadu

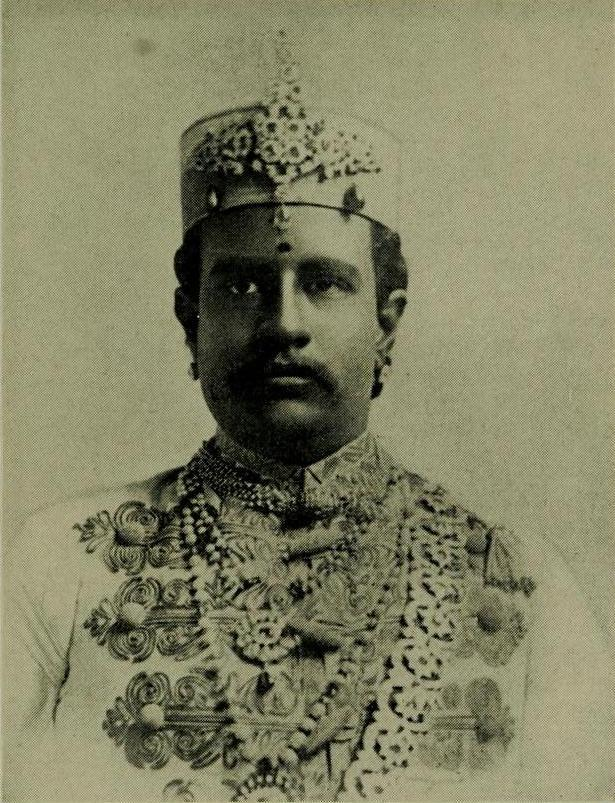
- Bhaskara Sethupathi, former Marava ruler of Ramnad kingdom

Regions with significant populations
- India: Ramnad, Madurai, Tirunelveli regions of Tamil Nadu

Languages
- Tamil

Religion
- Hinduism

Related ethnic groups
- Kallar, Agamudayar, Tamil people

Maravar (also known as Maravan and Marava) are a Tamil community in the state of Tamil Nadu. These people are one of the three branches of the Mukkulathor confederacy. Members of the Maravar community often use the honorific title Thevar. They are classified as an Other Backward Class or a Denotified Tribe in Tamil Nadu, depending on the district.

The Sethupathi rulers of the erstwhile Ramnad kingdom were from this community. The Maravar community, along with the Kallars, had a reputation for thieving and robbery from as early as the medieval period.

== Etymology ==
The term Maravar has diverse proposed etymologies; it may come simply from a Tamil word maram, meaning such things as vice and murder. or a term meaning "bravery".

== Social status ==
The Maravars were considered as Shudras and were free to worship in Hindu temples. According to Pamela G, Price, the Maravar were warriors who were in some cases zamindars. The zamins of Singampatti, Urkadu, Nerkattanseval, Thalavankottai, all ruled by members of Maravar caste. Occasionally the Setupathis had to respond to the charge they were not ritually pure.

During the formation of Tamilaham, the Maravars were brought in as socially outcast tribes or traditionally as lowest entrants into the shudra category. The Maravas to this day are feared as a thieving tribe and are an ostracised group in Tirunelveli region.

== Notable people ==
- Pasumpon Muthuramalinga Thevar, freedom fighter
- O. Panneerselvam, former Chief Minister of Tamil Nadu

== See also ==
- Uthumalai
- Kallar
- Agamudayar
