= Kingdom of Ramnad =

Kingdom in India, 1601 to 1949

- 1601–1949
- Status: Kingdom, later Zamindari estate
- Common languages: Tamil, English, Urdu, Persian
- Religion: Hindu, Jain
- History
  - Established: 1601
  - Disestablished: 1949
Preceded by	Succeeded by
Madurai Nayak Kingdom	Madras Presidency

The Kingdom of Ramnad was a permanently settled kingdom and later zamindari estate that existed in the Ramnad subdivision of the Madurai district and later Ramnad district of the erstwhile Madras Presidency in the East India Company from 1601. It was ruled by the rajas also had the title of Sethupathi. Madurai Nayaks ruled the Ramnad area with the appointed chieftains between 14th to 16th century CE, and in 17th century CE the appointed governors expanded their power to establish independent "Ramnad Kingdom" which was also called as "Maravar Kingdom" by the British. In 1795 CE, after an heir dispute, they were reduced to the status of zamidari by the East India Company. After the independence of India in 1947 the estates were merged in the Dominion of India and in 1949 all rulers lost the ruling rights, privy purse was also finally abolished in 1971.

The seat of administration was the town of Ramanathapuram. The Zamindari had its origins in the administrative area of Ramnad established by Muthu Krishnappa Nayak in the 1605 AD. After the fall of Madurai Nayaks, the governors established Kingdom of Ramnad. In 1803, the kingdom was converted to a zamindari by the British. The male rulers of Ramnathapuram also bore the title of Sethupathi or "protector of the bridge", the bridge here referring to the legendary Rama's Bridge while female rulers bore the title "Nachiyar".

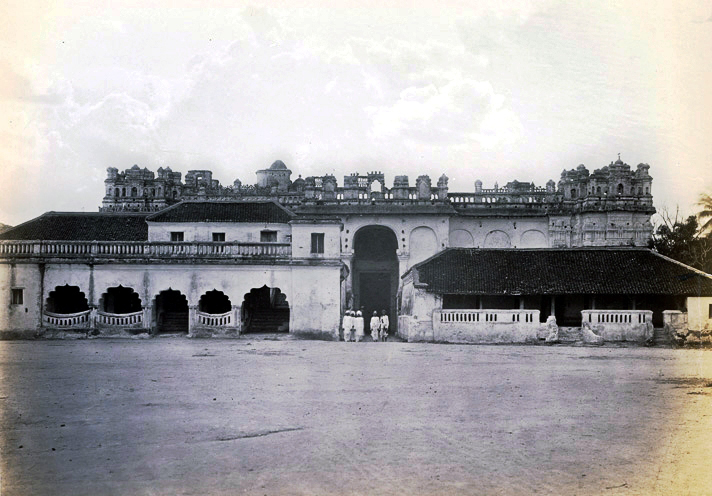
Ramnad Palace front view

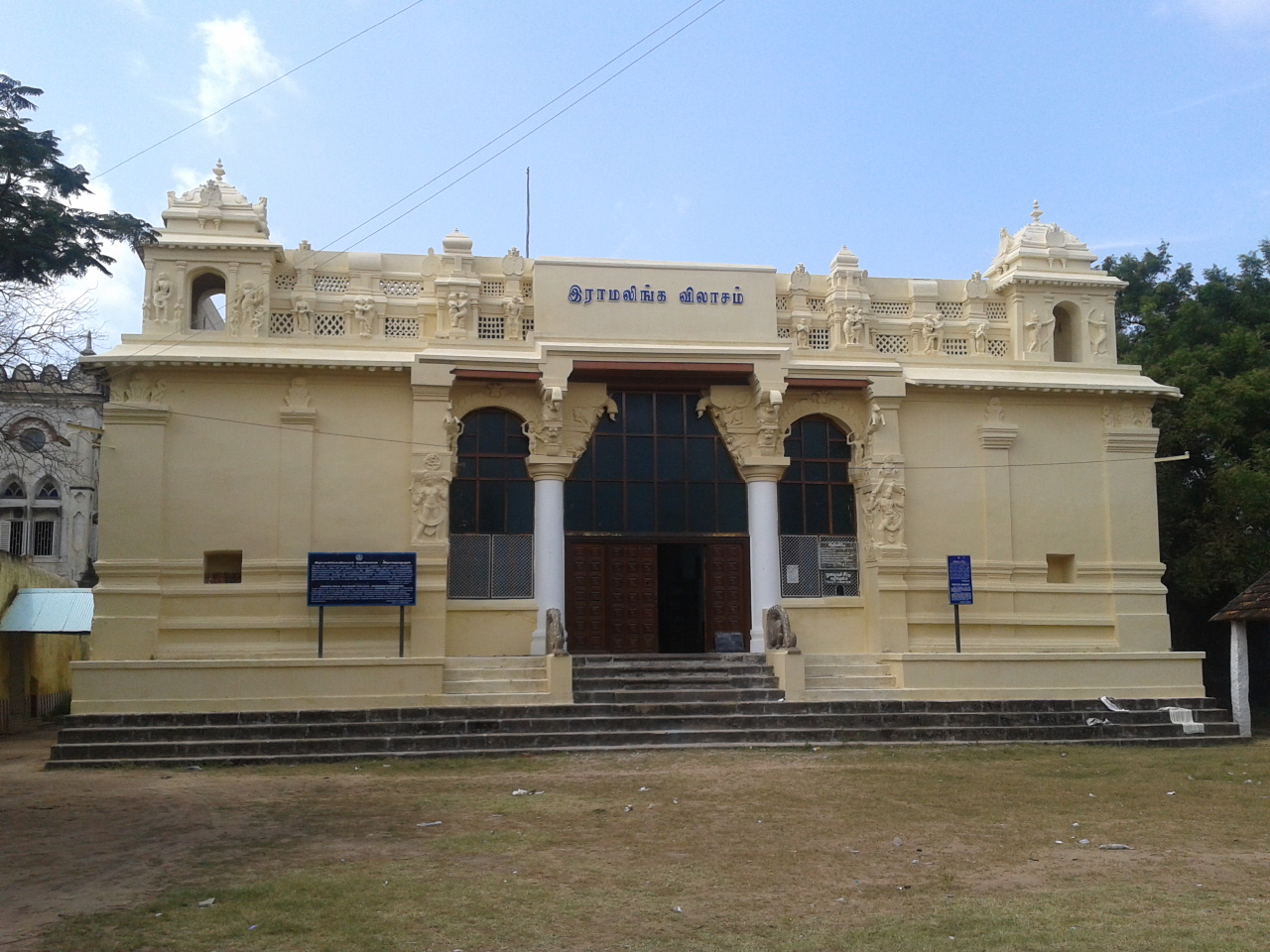
Built by Raghunatha Kilavan-Ramalinga Vilasam

== List of Sethupathi rulers ==
=== Chieftains With the Madurai Nayaks ===
- Udaiyan Sethupathi (a) Sadaikkan (1601–1623)
- Koottan Sethupathi (1623–1635)
- Dalavai Raghunatha Sethupathi (1635–1645)
- Thirumalai Raghunatha Sethupathi (1646–1676)
- Raja Suriya Sethupathi (1676)
- Aathana Raghunatha Sethupathi (1677)

=== Independent kings of Ramnad Kingdom ===
- Raghunatha Kilavan Sethupathi (1678–1710)
- Muthu Vairavanatha Sethupathi I (1710–1712)
- Vijaya Raghunatha Sethupathi (1713-1725)
- Sundaresvara Raghunatha Sethupathi (1725)
- Bavani Sangara Sethupathi (1725–1727)
- Kumara Muthu Vijaya Raghunatha Sethupathi (1728–1735)
- Sivakumara Muthu Vijaya Raghunatha Sethupathi (1735-1747)
- Rakka Thevar Sethupathi (1748)
- Sella Muthu Vijaya Raghunatha Sethupathi (1749–1762)
- Muthuramalinga Vijaya Ragunatha Sethupathi I (1762–1772, 1781–1795)

=== Ruler of princely state under British Raj ===
As king

- Interregnum (1795—1803)

As Zamindars

- Mangaleswari Nachiyar (1803–1807)
- Annaswami Sethupathi (1807–1820)
- Ramaswami Sethupathi (1820–1830)
- Muthu Chella Thevar Sethupathi (1830–1846)
- Parvatha Vardhani Ammal Nachchiyar (1846–1862)
- Muthuramalinga Sethupathi II (1862–1873)
- Court of Wards (1873–1889)
- Bhaskara Sethupathy (1889–1903)
- Dinakara Sethupathy
- Raja Rajeswara Sethupathi (1903–1929)
- Shanmugha Rajeswara Sethupathi (1929–1967)
- Dasarathan Sethupathi (March 1967 – December 1967)
- Ramanatha Sethupathi (1967–1979)
- Rajeswari Nachiyar (1979–present)

== Legend ==
The estate of Ramnad included the Hindu holy island city of Rameswaram, from where, legend has it that the Hindu god Rama launched his invasion of Ravana's Lanka. On the conclusion of the war and Rama's success in it, he appointed a Sethupathi or "lord of the bridge" to guard the way to the island. The "bridge" referred to here is the legendary Rama's Bridge which was believed to have been constructed by Rama. The chieftains of Ramnad were entrusted with the responsibility of protecting the bridge, hence the appellation.

== History ==
=== 14th-16th century CE: As traditional Maravar kings ===
During Muttu Krishnappa Nayak (1601–1609 A.D.) of Madurai Nayak dynasty reign, the Ramnadu region, due to lack of efficient leadership, crimes and robbery were found frequently against pilgrims of Rameswaram through the wild jungle. Due to lack of knowledge of the Jungles, Nayak army found it hard to control the robbers. Therefore, Muthu Krishnappa Nayaka (1601-1609 A.D.) laid down the foundation of the rule of the Sethupathi (watchmen of the bridge ) of Ramnad area under the Madurai Nayaks and made an agreement with the locals to stop the robbery. Muthu Krishnappa Nayaka appointed Sadayakka Teva as Sethupathi in 1605 A.D. to stop crimes and protect the pilgrims of Rameswaram through the wild and inhospitable region. When the power of the Nayak kings of Madurai began to decline in the late 17th century, the Raghunatha Kilavan of Ramnad asserted his independence.

=== 17th-19th century CE: Rise as Ramnad Kingdom or Maravar Kingdom ===
In the late 17th century, Raghunatha Kilavan crowned himself king of Ramnad and changed his seat from Pogalur to Ramnad close to the east coast on the request of Muslim trade merchants to give protection against Portuguese traders. With the help and fund from Muslim trade merchants, he erected massive fortifications to protect his capital. He ruled from 1673 to 1708 and oversaw the growth of the feudal chieftainship of Ramnad into powerful "Kingdom of Ramnad" which is known as "Maravar Kingdom". In 1725, the king of Tanjore claimed the northern part of the Ramnad kingdom (the Aranthangi region) up to the river Pambar in return for his services during the civil war in Ramnad. A vassal of Ramnad who was amongst the victors in the civil war took over the westerly located Sivaganga region, thereby leaving only three-fifths of the kingdom actually in the hands of the king of Ramnad.

=== 19th-20th century CE: reduced to zamidari jagir during British Raj ===
Ramnad participated in the Carnatic wars between the British and the French East India companies. The state came under British influence in the 1790s and the king of Ramnad was deposed in 1795 for misrule. The British, then, made the king's sister the ruler of Ramnad and deprecated the kingdom to a zamindari by a permanent sanad granting them jagir of Ramnad in 1803. Since then, until the India's independence in 1947, Ramnad was ruled by the queen and her descendants.

Raja Bhaskara Sethupathi, who lived in the late 19th century, borrowed large amounts of money from Nagarathar creditors for construction of irrigation works and massive developments projects and for charitable purposes that he soon ran into heavy debt. In 1895, most of the estate was pledged to the creditors who set up a trust for its administration and maintenance. Bhaskara Sethupathi's successors actively supported the Justice Party. Shanmugha Rajeswara Sethupathi was an active supporter of the Justice Party and promoted the Self-Respect Movement.

After the independence of India in 1947, the Government of India marged estates, jagiirs, kingdom with the Union of India. Consequently, in 1949 all rulers lost the ruling rights. In 1971, privy purse, an allowance given to the former rulers, was also abolished, thus ending all entitlements.

== See also ==
- Thanjavur Nayak kingdom, once ally and later adversary of Sethupathis
- Madurai Nayak dynasty, once ally and later adversary of Sethupathis

== Bibliography ==
- The Imperial Gazetteer of India. Clarendon Press. 1908. pp. 177–179.
