= History of Tamil Nadu =

The region of Tamil Nadu in the southeast of modern India, shows evidence of having had continuous human habitation from 15,000 BCE to 10,000 BCE. Throughout its history, spanning the early Upper Paleolithic age to modern times, this region has coexisted with various external cultures.

The three ancient Tamil dynasties, namely the Chera, the Chola, and the Pandya, were of ancient origins. Together, they ruled over this land with a unique culture and language, contributing to the growth of some of the oldest extant literature in the world. These three dynasties were in constant struggle with each other vying for hegemony over the land. Invasion by the Kalabhras during the 3rd century disturbed the traditional order of the land, displacing the three ruling kingdoms. These occupiers were overthrown by the resurgence of the Pandyas and the Pallavas, who restored the traditional kingdoms. The Cholas who re-emerged from obscurity in the 9th century by defeating the Pallavas and the Pandyas rose to become a great power and extended their empire over the entire southern peninsula. At its height the Chola empire spanned almost 3,600,000 km² (1,389,968 sq mi) straddling the Bay of Bengal. The Chola navy held sway over the Sri Vijaya kingdom in Southeast Asia.

Rapid changes in the political situation of the rest of India occurred due to incursions of Muslim armies from the northwest and the decline of the three ancient dynasties during the 14th century. Despite this, the Vijayanagara Empire gained a foothold in the region from the late 14th century until the 16th century. In the early 1600's Nayakas of Madurai gained independence from Vijayanagara Empire. In the 17th and 18th centuries, the Maratha Empire expanded its influence into the northern regions of present-day Tamil Nadu. The Madras Presidency, comprising most of southern India, was created in the late 18th century and was ruled directly by the British. After the independence of India, after the Telugu and Malayalam parts of Madras state were separated from Tamilagam state in 1956, it was renamed as Tamil Nadu on January 14, 1969, by the state government.

== Prehistoric period ==
=== Palaeolithic ===
For most of the Lower Palaeolithic stage, pre-modern humans lived close to river valleys with sparse forest cover or in grassland environments. The population density was very low and so far only two localities of this lower Palaeolithic culture have been found in South India. Pre-modern humans in South India, belonging to the species of Homo erectus, lived in this primitive 'old stone age' (Palaeolithic) for quite a long time, using only crude implements such as hand axes and choppers and subsisting as hunter-gatherers.

In Attirampakkam, archaeologists from the Sharma Centre for Heritage Education excavated ancient stone tools which suggests that a human-like population existed in the Tamil Nadu region somewhere around 300,000 years before Homo sapiens arrived from Africa.

A discovery of a rare fossilized baby brain in Viluppuram district, by a team of archaeologists was reported in April 2003, It is estimated to be about 187,000 years - 200,000 years or older. The ancestor of modern humans (Homo sapiens) who appeared around 50,000 years ago was more developed and could make thinner flake tools and blade-like tools using a variety of stones. From about 10,000 years ago, humans made still smaller tools called Microlithic tools. The material used by the early humans to make these tools were jasper, agate, flint, quartz, etc. In 1949, researchers found such microliths in Tirunelveli district. Archaeological evidence suggests that the Microlithic period lasted between 6000–3000 BCE.

=== Neolithic ===
In Tamil Nadu, the Neolithic period had its advent around 2500 BCE. Humans of the Neolithic period made their stone tools in finer shapes by grinding and polishing. A Neolithic axe head with ancient writing on it has been found in North Tamil Nadu Near Palar river. The Neolithic humans lived mostly on small flat hills or on the foothills in small, more or less permanent settlements but for periodical migration for grazing purposes. They gave the dead proper burials within urns or pits. They were also starting to use copper for making certain tools or weapons.

=== Iron Age ===
During the Iron Age humans started using iron for making tools and weapons. The Iron Age culture in peninsular India is marked by Megalithic burial sites, which are found in several hundreds of places. On the basis of both some excavations and the typology of the burial monuments, it has been suggested that there was a gradual spread of the Iron Age sites from the north to the south. Comparative excavations carried out in Adichanallur in Thirunelveli District and in Northern India have provided evidence of a southward migration of the Megalithic culture.

The earliest clear evidence of the presence of the megalithic urn burials are those dating from around 1800 BCE, which have been discovered at various places in Tamil Nadu, notably at Adichanallur, 24 km from Tirunelveli, where archaeologists from the Archaeological Survey of India unearthed 157 urns, including 15 containing human skulls, skeletons and bones, plus husks, grains of rice, charred rice and Neolithic Celts. One urn has writing inside, which, according to archaeologists from the Archaeological Survey of India, resembles early Tamil-Brahmi script, confirming it of the Neolithic period 2800 years ago. Adhichanallur has been announced as an archaeological site for further excavation and studies.

Mentions of the political situation of Tamil Nadu before the common era are found in Ashoka's edicts dated c.3rd century BCE and, vaguely, in the Hathigumpha inscription dated c.2nd century BCE.

== Early history ==
Ancient Tamil Nadu contained three monarchical states, headed by kings called Vendhar and several tribal chieftaincies, headed by the chiefs called by the general denomination Vel or Velir. Still lower at the local level there were clan chiefs called kizhar or mannar. During the 3rd century BCE, the Deccan was part of the Maurya Empire, and from the middle of the 1st century BCE to 2nd century CE the same area was ruled by the Satavahana dynasty. The Tamil area had an independent existence outside the control of these northern empires. The Tamil kings and chiefs were always in conflict with each other mostly over the property. The royal courts were mostly places of social gathering rather than places of dispensation of authority; they were centres for distribution of resources. Tamil literature Tolkappiyam sheds some light on early religion. Gradually the rulers came under the influence of Vedic beliefs, which encouraged performance of sacrifices to enhance the status of the ruler. Buddhism, Jainism and Ajivika co-existed with early Shaivite, Vaishnavism and Shaktism during the first five centuries.

The names of the three dynasties, Cholas, Pandyas, and Cheras, are mentioned in the Pillars of Ashoka (inscribed 273–232 BCE) inscriptions, among the kingdoms, which though not subject to Ashoka, were on friendly terms with him. The king of Kalinga, Kharavela, who ruled around 150 BCE, mentioned in the famous Hathigumpha inscription of the confederacy of the Tamil kingdoms that had existed for over 100 years.

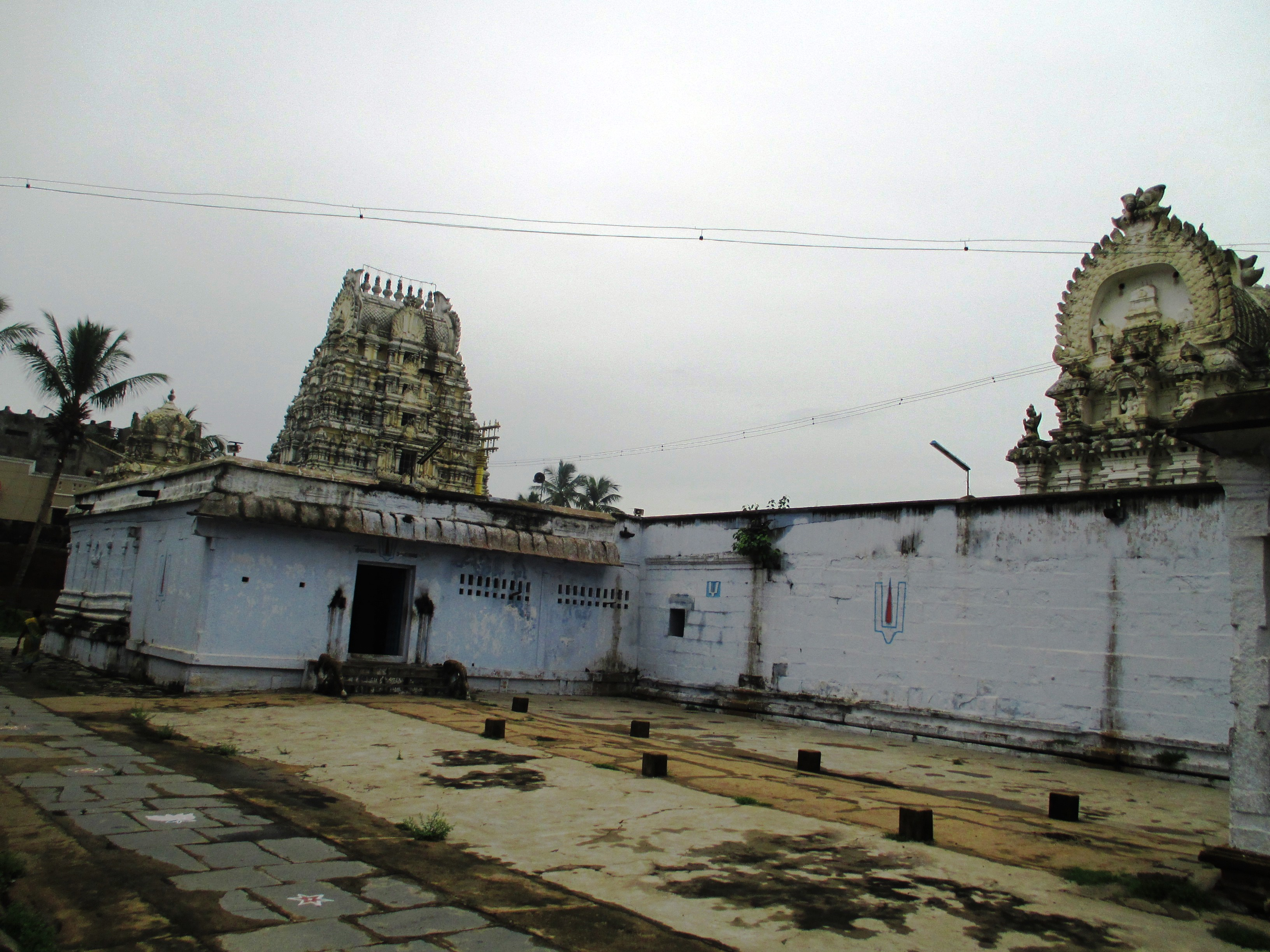
Yathothkari Perumal Temple is one of the 108 Divya Desams and is mentioned in the Sangam Text Perumpāṇāṟṟuppaṭai as the god sleeping on a serpent bed at the town Thiruvekka.

Karikala Chola was the most famous early Chola. He is mentioned in a number of poems in the Sangam poetry. Purananuru poem 224 mentions him as a great king who performed Vedic Sacrifices. In later times Karikala was the subject of many legends found in the Cilappatikaram and in inscriptions and literary works of the 11th and 12th centuries. They attribute to him the conquest of the whole of India up to the Himalayas and the construction of the flood banks of the river Kaveri with the aid of his feudatories. These legends, however, are conspicuous by their absence in the Sangam poetry. Kocengannan was another famous early Chola king who has been extolled in a number of poems of the Sangam period. He was even made a Saiva saint during the medieval period.

Pandyas ruled initially from Korkai, a seaport on the southernmost tip of the Indian peninsula, and in later times moved to Madurai. Pandyas are also mentioned in Sangam Literature, as well as by Greek and Roman sources during this period. Megasthenes in his Indika mentions the Pandyan kingdom. The Pandyas controlled the present districts of Madurai, Tirunelveli, and parts of south Kerala. They had trading contacts with Greece and Rome. With the other kingdoms of Tamilakam, they maintained trading contacts and marital relationships with Tamil merchants from Eelam. Various Pandya kings find mention in a number of poems in the Sangam literature. Among them, Nedunjeliyan, 'the victor of Talaiyalanganam' deserves a special mention. Besides several short poems found in the Akananuru and the Purananuru collections, there are two major works—Mathuraikkanci and the Netunalvatai (in the collection of Pattupattu) that give a glimpse into the society and commercial activities in the Pandyan kingdom during the Sangam age. The early Pandyas went into obscurity at the end of the 3rd century CE during the incursion of the Kalabhras.

The kingdom of the Cheras comprised the modern Western Tamil Nadu and Kerala, along the western or Malabar Coast of southern India. Their proximity to the sea favoured trade with Africa. Chera rulers dated to the first few centuries AD. It records the names of the kings, the princes, and the court poets who extolled them. The internal chronology of this literature is still far from settled, and at present, a connected account of the history of the period cannot be derived. Uthiyan Cheralathan, Nedum Cheralathan and Senguttuvan Chera are some of the rulers referred to in the Sangam poems. Senguttuvan Chera, the most celebrated Chera king, is famous for the legends surrounding Kannagi, the heroine of the Tamil epic Silapathikaram.

These early kingdoms sponsored the growth of some of the oldest extant literature in Tamil. The classical Tamil literature, referred to as Sangam literature is attributed to the period between 500 BCE and 300 CE. The poems of Sangam literature, which deal with emotional and material topics, were categorised and collected into various anthologies during the medieval period. These Sangam poems paint the picture of a fertile land and of a people who were organised into various occupational groups. The governance of the land was through hereditary monarchies, although the sphere of the state's activities and the extent of the ruler's powers were limited through the adherence to the established order (dharma). The people were loyal to their kings and roving bards, musicians and dancers gathered at the royal courts of the generous kings. The arts of music and dancing were highly developed and popular. Musical instruments of various types are mentioned in the Sangam poems. The amalgamation of the southern and the northern styles of dancing started during this period and is reflected fully in the epic Cilappatikaram.

Internal and external trade was well organised and active. Evidence from both archaeology and literature speaks of a flourishing foreign trade with the Yavanas (Greeks). The port city of Puhar on the east coast and Muziris on the west coast of south India were emporia of foreign trade, where huge ships moored, offloading precious merchandise. This trade started to decline after the 2nd century CE and the direct contact between the Roman empire and the ancient Tamil country was replaced by trade with the Arabs and the Auxumites of East Africa. Internal trade was also brisk and goods were sold and bartered. Agriculture was the main profession of a vast majority of the populace.

== Interregnum (300–600) ==
After the close of the Sangam era, from about 300 to about 600 CE, there was an almost total lack of information regarding occurrences in the Tamil land. Some time about 300 CE, the whole region was upset by the appearance of the Kalabhras. These people are described in later literature as 'evil rulers' who overthrew the established Tamil kings and got a stranglehold of the country. information about their origin and details about their reign is scarce. They did not leave many artifacts or monuments. The only source of information on them is the scattered mentions in Buddhist and Jain literature.

Historians speculate that these people followed Buddhist or Jain faiths and were antagonistic towards the Hindu religions (viz. the Astika schools) adhered by the majority of inhabitants of the Tamil region during the early centuries CE. As a result, Hindu scholars and authors who followed their decline in the 7th and 8th century may have expunged any mention of them in their texts and generally tended to paint their rule in a negative light. It is perhaps due to this reason, the period of their rule is known as a 'Dark Age'—an interregnum. Some of the ruling families migrated northwards and found enclaves for themselves away from the Kalabhras. Jainism and Buddhism, took deep roots in the society, giving birth to a large body of ethical poetry.

Writing became very widespread and vatteluttu evolved from the Tamil-Brahmi became a mature script for writing Tamil. While several anthologies were compiled by collecting bardic poems of earlier centuries, some of the epic poems such as the Cilappatikaram and didactic works such as the Tirukkural were also written during this period. The patronage of the Jain and Buddhist scholars by the Kalabhra kings influenced the nature of the literature of the period, and most of the works that can be attributed to this period were written by the Jain and Buddhist authors. In the field of dance and music, the elite started patronising new polished styles, partly influenced by northern ideas, in the place of the folk styles. A few of the earliest rock-cut temples belong to this period. Brick temples (known as kottam, devakulam, and palli) dedicated to various deities are referred to in literary works. Kalabhras were displaced around the 7th century by the revival of Pallava and Pandya power.

Even with the exit of the Kalabhras, the Jain and Buddhist influence still remained in Tamil Nadu. The early Pandya and the Pallava kings were followers of these faiths. The Hindu reaction to this apparent decline of their religion was growing and reached its peak during the later part of the 7th century. There was a widespread Hindu revival during which a huge body of Saiva and Vaishnava literature was created. Many Saiva Nayanmars and Vaishnava Alvars provided a great stimulus to the growth of popular devotional literature. Karaikkal Ammaiyar who lived in the 6th century CE was the earliest of these Nayanmars. The celebrated Saiva hymnists Sundaramurthi, Thirugnana Sambanthar and Thirunavukkarasar were of this period. Vaishnava Alvars such as Poigai Alvar, Bhoothathalvar and Peyalvar produced devotional hymns for their faith and their songs were collected later into the four thousand poems of Naalayira Divyap Prabhandham.

== Age of empires (600–1300) ==
The medieval period of the history of the Tamil country saw the rise and fall of many kingdoms, some of whom went on to the extent of empires, exerting influences both in India and overseas. The Cholas who were very active during the Sangam age were entirely absent during the first few centuries. The period started with the rivalry between the Pandyas and the Pallavas, which in turn caused the revival of the Cholas. The Cholas went on to become a great power. Their decline saw the brief resurgence of the Pandyas. This period was also that of the re-invigorated Hinduism during which temple building and religious literature were at their best.

The Hindu sects Saivism and Vaishnavism became dominant, replacing the prevalence of Jainism and Buddhism of the previous era. Saivism was patronised more by the Chola kings and became more or less a state religion. Some of the earliest temples that are still standing were built during this period by the Pallavas. The rock-cut temples in Mamallapuram and the majestic Kailasanatha and Vaikuntaperumal temples of Kanchipuram stand testament to the Pallava art. The Cholas, utilising their prodigious wealth earned through their extensive conquests, built long-lasting stone temples including the great Brihadisvara temple of Thanjavur and exquisite bronze sculptures. Temples dedicated to Siva and Vishnu received liberal donations of money, jewels, animals, and land, and thereby became powerful economic institutions. Mutharaiyar who ruled the central part of Tamil Nadu between 600 - 900 CE. The Cauvery Delta regions were mostly ruled by the Muthraiyar Kings having Woraiyur as their Capital. Vijayalayachola conquered Tanjore from Dhancheya Muhuraiyar King who established the Tanjore City. Among the noted Muthariyar King, Perumbidugu alias Swaran Maran Muthraiyar who conquered consequently 14 battles and known as the Emperor in Tamil Nadu (Perarasar). He and his ancestors built many cave temples in Tiruchirappalli and Pudukottai regions. Among them Kuvavan Sathan alias Videl Vidugu Muthraiyar built many cave temples in Pudukottai Region. Mutharaiyars and ancestors are known as Muthuraja in central of part of Tamil Nadu particularly Tiruchirappalli.

Tamil script replaced the vatteluttu script throughout Tamil Nadu for writing Tamil. Religious literature flourished during the period. The Tamil epic, Kamban's Ramavatharam, was written in the 13th century. A contemporary of Kamban was the famous poet Auvaiyar who found great happiness in writing for young children. The secular literature was mostly court poetry devoted to the eulogy of the rulers. The religious poems of the previous period and the classical literature of the Sangam period were collected and systematised into several anthologies. Sanskrit was patronised by the priestly groups for religious rituals and other ceremonial purposes. Nambi Andar Nambi, who was a contemporary of Rajaraja Chola I, collected and arranged the books on Saivism into eleven books called Tirumurais. The hagiology of Saivism was standardised in Periyapuranam by Sekkilar, who lived during the reign of Kulothunga Chola II (1133–1150 CE). Jayamkondar's Kalingattupparani, a semi-historical account on the two invasions of Kalinga by Kulothunga Chola I was an early example of a biographical work.

=== Pallavas ===
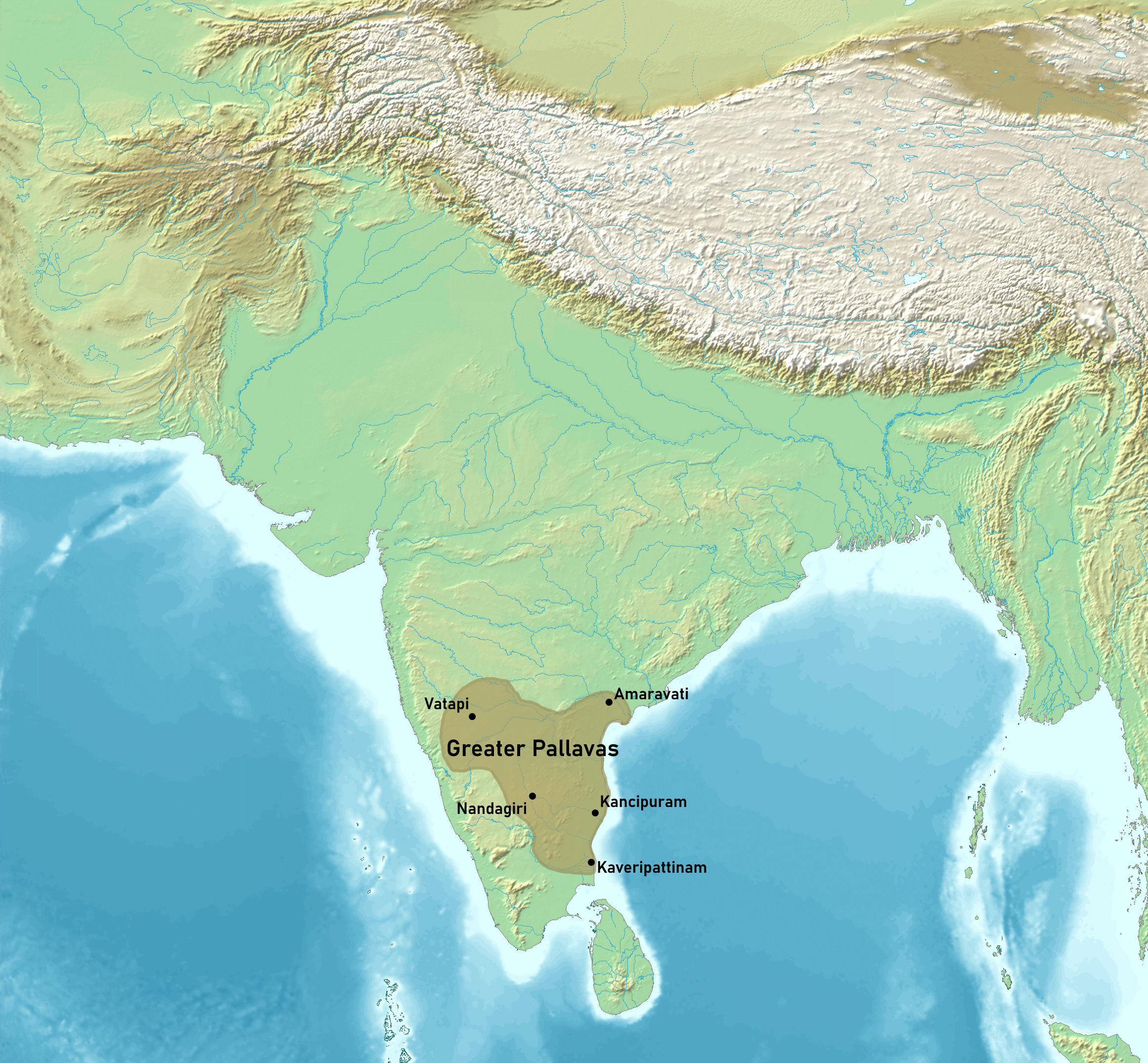
Greatest extent of Pallava Empire, during the reign of Narasimhavarman I (630-668 CE)

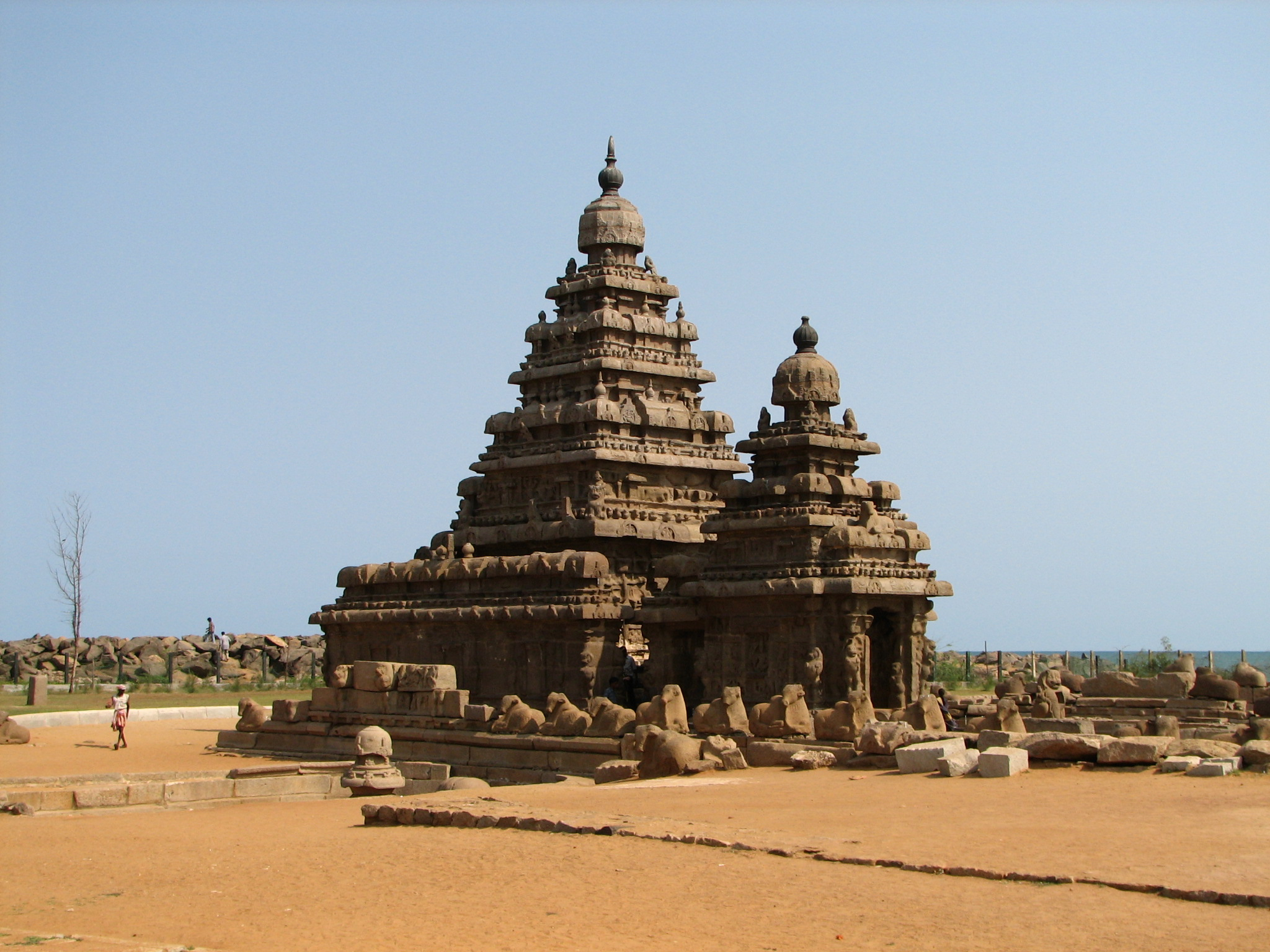
Shore Temple in Mamallapuram built by the Pallavas. (c. eighth century CE)

The 7th century Tamil Nadu saw the rise of the Pallavas under Mahendravarman I and his son Mamalla Narasimhavarman I. The Pallavas were not a recognised political power before the 2nd century. It has been widely accepted by scholars that they were originally executive officers under the Satavahana kings. After the fall of the Satavahanas, they began to get control over parts of Andhra and the Tamil country. Later they had marital ties with the Vishnukundina who ruled over the Deccan. It was around 550 CE under King Simhavishnu that the Pallavas emerged into prominence. They subjugated the Cholas and reigned as far south as the Kaveri River. The Pallavas were at their finest during the reigns of Narasimhavarman I and Pallavamalla Nandivarman II. Pallavas ruled a large portion of South India with Kanchipuram as their capital. Dravidian architecture during the Pallava rule includes the Shore Temple, built for Narasimhavarman II, which is a UNESCO World Heritage Site. Many sources describe Bodhidharma, the founder of the Zen school of Buddhism in China, as a prince of the Pallava dynasty. Alongside Bodhidharma, another monk, Vajrabodhi is said to have been the son of a Tamil aristocrat, travelled from Tamil Nadu to the Tang capital of Chang'an, via Sri Lanka and Srivijaya, after mastering the art of Tantric Buddhism. He took a plethora of new theological beliefs to a China that was largely following Confucianism or Daoism. Vajrabodhi's contribution to the growth of Tantric Buddhism in China has been recorded by one of his lay disciples, Lü Xiang.

During the 6th and the 7th centuries, the western Deccan saw the rise of the Chalukyas based in Vatapi. Pulakeshin II (c.610–642) invaded the Pallava kingdom in the reign of Mahendravarman I. Narasimhavarman who succeeded Mahendravarman mounted a counter invasion of the Chalukya country and captured the Chalukyan capital Vatapi and ruled it for 12 years. The rivalry between the Chalukyas and the Pallavas continued for another 100 years until the demise of the Chalukyas around 750. The Chalukyas and Pallavas fought numerous battles and the Pallava capital Kanchipuram was occupied by Vikramaditya II during the reign of Nandivarman II. Nandivarman II had a very long reign (732–796). He led an expedition to the Ganga kingdom (south Mysore) in 760. Pallavas were also in constant conflict with the Pandyas and their frontier shifted along the river Kaveri. The Pallavas had the more difficult existence of the two as they had to fight on two fronts—against the Pandyas as well as the Chalukyas.

=== Pandyas ===
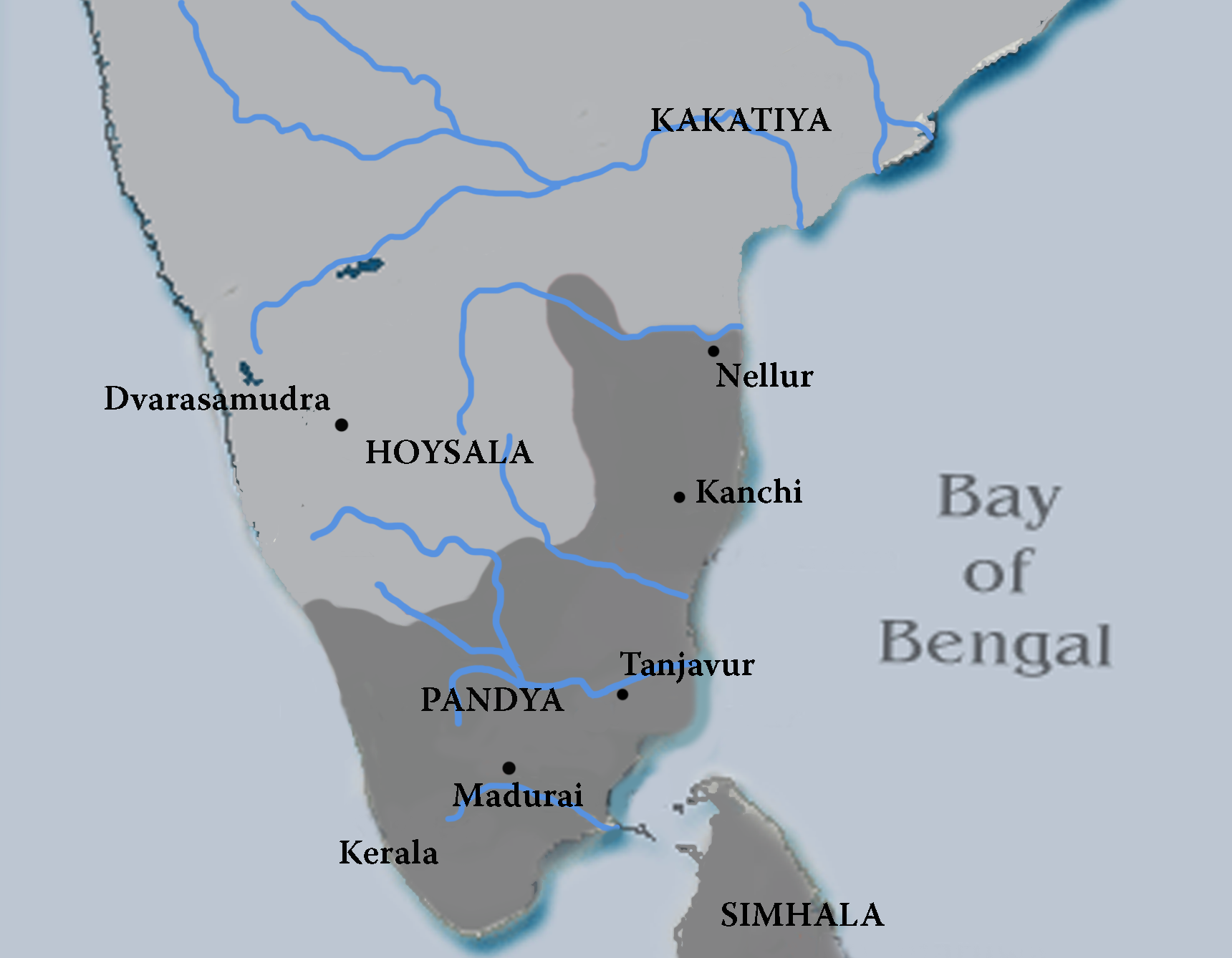
Pandyan Empire

Pandya Kadungon (560–590) is credited with the overthrow of the Kalabhras in the south. Kadungon and his son Maravarman Avanisulamani revived the Pandya power. Pandya Cendan extended their rule to the Chera country. His son Arikesari Parantaka Maravarman (c. 650–700) had a long and prosperous rule. He fought many battles and extended the Pandya power. Pandya was well known since ancient times, with contacts, even diplomatic, reaching the Roman Empire; during the 13th century, Marco Polo mentioned it as the richest empire in existence.

The Pandyan Empire was large enough to pose a serious threat to the Pallava power. Pandya Maravarman Rajasimha aligned with the Chalukya Vikramaditya II and attacked the Pallava king Nandivarman II. Varagunan I defeated the Pallavas in a battle on the banks of the Kaveri. The Pallava king Nandivarman sought to restrain the growing power of the Pandyas and went into an alliance with the feudal chieftains of Kongu and Chera countries. The armies met in several battles and the Pandya forces scored decisive victories in them. Pandyas under Srimara Srivallaba also invaded Sri Lanka and devastated the northern provinces in 840.

The Pandya power continued to grow under Srimara and encroached further into the Pallava territories. The Pallavas were now facing a new threat in the form of the Rashtrakutas who had replaced the Chalukyas in the western Deccan. However, the Pallavas found an able monarch in Nandivarman III, who with the help of his Ganga and Chola allies defeated Srimara at the Battle of Tellaru. The Pallava kingdom again extended up to the river Vaigai. The Pandyas suffered further defeats at the hands of the Pallava Nripatunga at Arisil (c. 848). From then the Pandyas had to accept the overlordship of the Pallavas.

=== Cholas ===
Around 850, out of obscurity rose Vijayalaya Chola, the successor of Srikantha Chola made use of an opportunity arising out of a conflict between Pandyas and Pallavas, captured Thanjavur from Mutharaiyar dynasty and eventually established the imperial line of the medieval Cholas. Vijayalaya revived the Chola dynasty and his son Aditya I helped establish their independence. He invaded Pallava kingdom in 903 and killed the Pallava king Aparajita in battle, ending the Pallava reign. The Chola kingdom under Parantaka I expanded to cover the entire Pandya country. However, towards the end of his reign, he suffered several reverses by the Rashtrakutas who had extended their territories well into the Chola kingdom.

Chola Empire under Rajendra Chola (c. 1030).

The Cholas went into a temporary decline during the next few years due to weak kings, palace intrigues and succession disputes. Despite a number of attempts, the Pandya country could not be completely subdued and the Rashtrakutas were still a powerful enemy in the north. However, the Chola revival began with the accession of Rajaraja Chola I in 985. Cholas rose as a notable military, economic and cultural power in Asia under Rajaraja and his son Rajendra Chola I. The Chola territories stretched from the islands of Maldives in the south to as far north as the banks of the river Ganges in Bengal. Rajaraja Chola conquered peninsular South India, annexed parts of Sri Lanka and occupied the islands of Maldives. Rajendra Chola extended the Chola conquests to the Malayan archipelago by defeating the Srivijaya kingdom. He defeated Mahipala, the king of Bihar and Bengal, and to commemorate his victory he built a new capital called Gangaikonda Cholapuram (the town of Cholas who conquered the Ganges). At its peak, the Chola Empire extended from the island of Sri Lanka in the south to the Godavari basin in the north. The kingdoms along the east coast of India up to the river Ganges acknowledged Chola suzerainty. Chola navies invaded and conquered Srivijaya in the Malayan archipelago. Chola armies exacted tribute from Thailand and the Khmer kingdom of Cambodia. During the reign of Rajaraja and Rajendra, the administration of the Chola empire matured considerably. The empire was divided into a number of self-governing local government units, and the officials were selected through a system of popular elections.

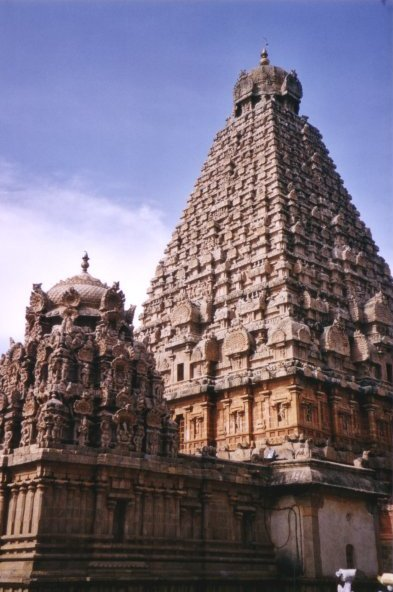
Brihadishwara Temple

Throughout this period, the Cholas were constantly troubled by the ever-resilient Sinhalas trying to overthrow the Chola occupation of Lanka, Pandya princes trying to win independence for their traditional territories, and by the growing ambitions of the Chalukyas in the western Deccan. The history of this period was one of constant warfare between the Cholas and of these antagonists. A balance of power existed between the Chalukyas and the Cholas and there was a tacit acceptance of the Tungabhadra river as the boundary between the two empires. However, the bone of contention between these two powers was the growing Chola influence in the Vengi kingdom. The Cholas and Chalukyas fought many battles and both kingdoms were exhausted by the endless battles and a stalemate existed.

Marital and political alliances between the Eastern Chalukya kings based around Vengi located on the south banks of the river Godavari began during the reign of Rajaraja following his invasion of Vengi. Virarajendra Chola's son Athirajendra Chola was assassinated in a civil disturbance in 1070 and Kulothunga Chola I ascended the Chola throne starting the Chalukya Chola dynasty. Kulothunga was a son of the Vengi king Rajaraja Narendra. The Chalukya Chola dynasty saw very capable rulers in Kulothunga Chola I and Vikrama Chola, however, the eventual decline of the Chola power practically started during this period. The Cholas lost control of the island of Lanka and were driven out by the revival of Sinhala power. Around 1118 they also lost control of Vengi to Western Chalukya king Vikramaditya VI and Gangavadi (southern Mysore districts) to the growing power of Hoysala Vishnuvardhana, a Chalukya feudatory. In the Pandya territories, the lack of a controlling central administration caused a number of claimants to the Pandya throne to cause a civil war in which the Sinhalas and the Cholas were involved by proxy. During the last century of the Chola existence, a permanent Hoysala army was stationed in Kanchipuram to protect them from the growing influence of the Pandyas. Rajendra Chola III was the last Chola king. The Kadava chieftain Kopperunchinga I even captured Rajendra and held him prisoner. At the close of Rajendra's reign (1279), the Pandyan empire was at the height of prosperity and had completely absorbed the Chola kingdom. The Cholas also found a place in the very famous novel by Kalki titled Ponniyin Selvan which portrays the whole Chola history with Rajaraja Cholan ( Ponniyin Selvan, Arul Mozhi Varman, Vallavarayan Vanthiyaththevan, Karikalar, Nandhini, Kundhavi) as the characters of the novel.

=== Cheras ===
The Cheras were an ancient Dravidian royal dynasty of Tamil origin who ruled in regions of Tamil Nadu and Kerala in India. Together with the Chola and the Pandyas, it formed the three principal warring Iron Age kingdoms of southern India in the early centuries of the Common Era. They established their control over a wide area comprising Venad, Kuttanad, Kudanad, Pazhinad, and more. In other words, they governed the area between Alappuzha in the south to Kasargod in the north. This included Palghat, Coimbatore, Salem, and Kollimalai. The capital was Vanchi, which the Romans who actively traded with the Cheras knew as Muzris.

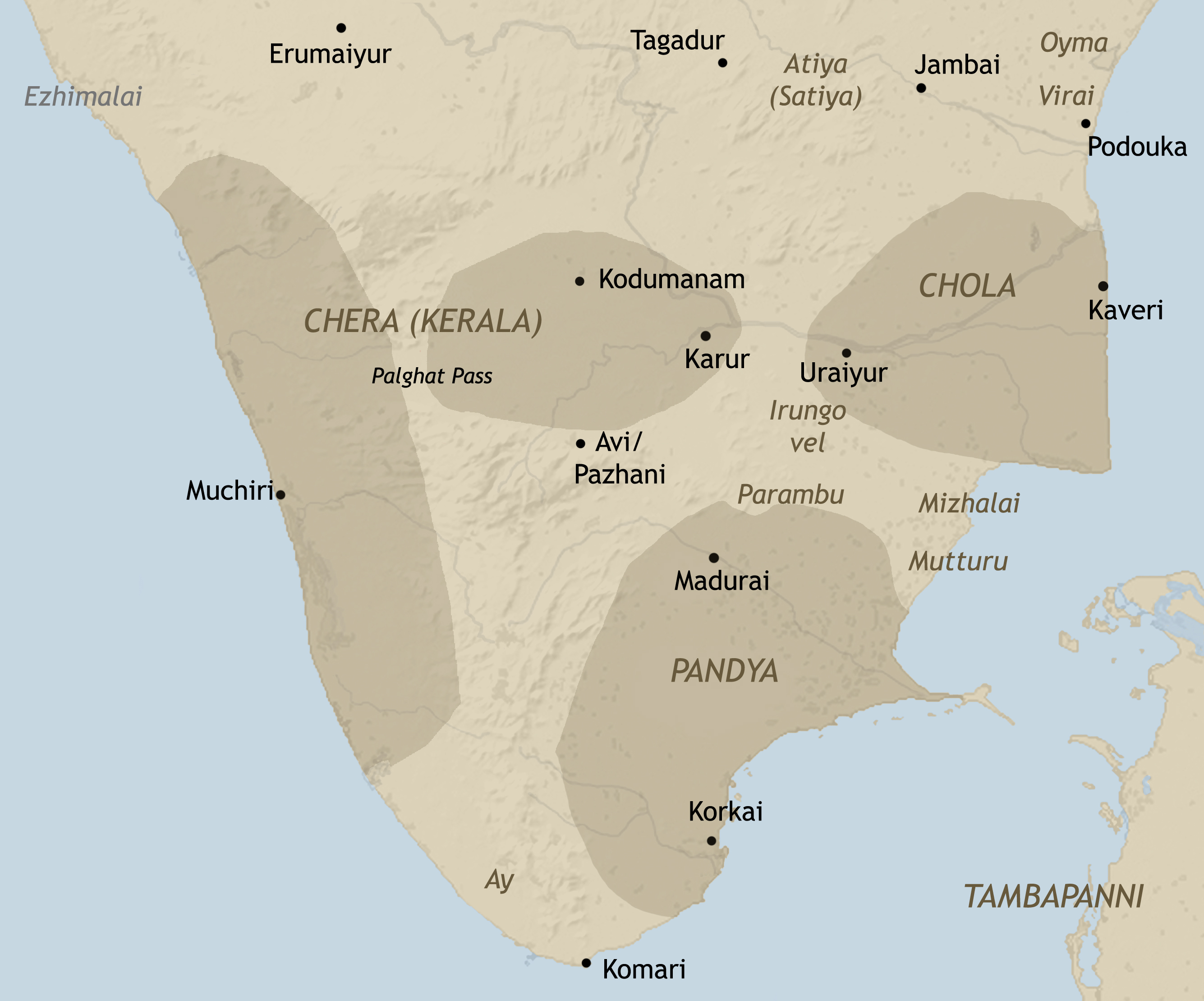
Chera Empire.

By the early centuries of the Common Era, civil society and statehood under the Cheras were developed in present-day western Tamil Nadu. The location of the Chera capital is generally assumed to be at modern Karur (identified with the Korra of Ptolemy). The Chera kingdom later extended to the plains of Kerala, the Palghat gap, along the river Perar and occupied land between the river Perar and river Periyar, creating two harbour towns, Tondi (Tyndis) and Muciri (Muziris), where the Roman trade settlements flourished.

The Cheras were in continuous conflict with the neighboring Cholas and Pandyas. The Cheras are said to have defeated the combined armies of the Pandyas and the Cholas and their ally states. They also made battles with the Kadambās of Banavasi and the Yavanas (the Greeks) on the Indian coast. After the 2nd century AD, the Cheras' power decayed rapidly with the decline of the lucrative trade with the Romans.

The Tamil poetic collection called Sangam literature describes a long line of Chera rulers dated to the first few centuries AD. It records the names of the kings, the princes, and the court poets who extolled them. The internal chronology of this literature is still far from settled, and at present, a connected account of the history of the period cannot be derived. Uthiyan Cheralathan, Nedum Cheralathan and Senguttuvan Chera are some of the rulers referred to in the Sangam poems. Senguttuvan Chera, the most celebrated Chera king, is famous for the legends surrounding Kannagi, the heroine of the Tamil epic Silapathikaram.

The Chera kingdom owed its importance to trade with West Asia, Greece, and Rome. Its geographical advantages, like the abundance of exotic spices, the navigability of the rivers connecting the Ghat mountains with the Arabian Sea, and the discovery of favorable Monsoon winds which carried sailing ships directly from the Arabian coast to Chera kingdom, combined to produce a veritable boom in the Chera foreign trade.

The Later Cheras ruled from the 9th century. Little is known about the Cheras between the two dynasties. The second dynasty, Kulasekharas ruled from a city on the banks of River Periyar called Mahodayapuram (Kodungallur). Though they never regained the old status in the Peninsula, the Kulasekharas fought numerous wars with their powerful neighbors and diminished to history in the 12th century as a result of continuous Chola and Rashtrakuta invasions. The Chera Dynasty was supported by Tamil warriors such as Villavar, Vanavar and Malayar clans.

The Chera rulers of Venadu, based at the port Quilon in southern Kerala, trace their relations back to the later/second Cheras. Ravi Varma Kulasekhara, ruler of Venadu from 1299 to 1314, is known for his ambitious military campaigns into the former Pandya and Chola territories.

=== Pandya revival ===
After being overshadowed by the Pallavas and Cholas for centuries, the Pandyas revived their fortunes in the 13th century and the Pandya power extended from the Telugu territories along the banks of the Godavari river to the northern half of Sri Lanka. When Kulasekara Pandyan I died in 1308, a conflict stemming from succession disputes arose amongst his sons – the legitimate Sundara Pandya and the illegitimate Vira Pandya (who was favoured by the king) fought each other for the throne. Soon Madurai fell into the hands of the invading armies of the Delhi Sultanate (which initially gave protection to the vanquished Sundara Pandyan).

=== Delhi Sultanate ===
Malik Kafur, a general of the Delhi Sultan Alauddin Khalji invaded and sacked Madurai in 1311. Pandyas and their descendants were confined to a small region around Tirunelveli for a few more years. Ravivarman Kulasekara (r. 1299–1314), a Chera (Perumal) feudatory of Kulasekara Pandya, staked his claim to the Pandya throne. Ravivarman, utilizing the unsettled nature of the country, quickly overran the southern Tamil Nadu and brought the entire region from Kanyakumari to Kanchipuram, under the Chera kingdom. His inscription was found in Punaamalli, a suburb of Madras. But, Ravivarman's hold over Kanchi was only short-lived and his aggressive activities were arrested by the Kākatiya ruler, Pratāparudra II. The Kākatiya army under the command of Muppidi Nāyaka marched to Kanchi and captured the city.

== Vijayanagar and Nayak period (1300–1650) ==
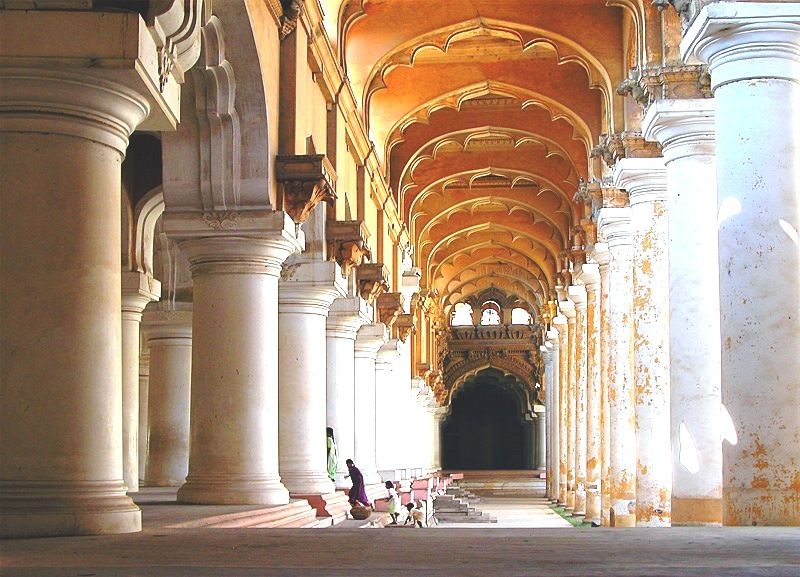
Tirumalai Nayak Palace, Madurai

The 14th-century invasion by the Delhi Sultans caused a retaliatory reaction from the Hindus, who rallied to build a new kingdom, called the Vijayanagara Empire. Bukka, with his brother Harihara, founded the Vijayanagara Empire based in the city of Vijayanagara in Karnataka. Under Bukka the empire prospered and continued to expand towards the south. Bukka and his son Kampana conquered most of the kingdoms of southern India. In 1371 the Vijayanagar empire defeated the short-lived Madurai Sultanate, which had been established by the remnants of the invading Khalji army. Eventually the empire covered the entire south India. Vijayanagara empire established local governors called Nayaks to rule in the various territories of the empire.

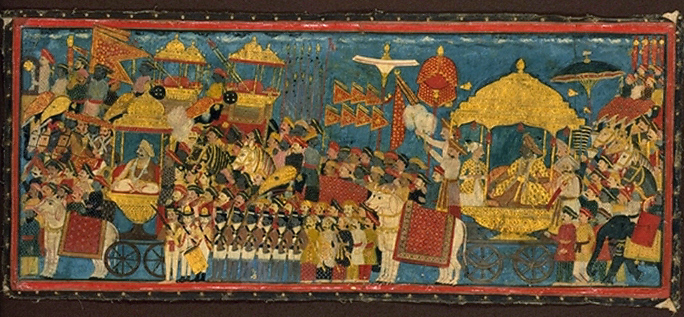
Tanjore became a major cultural centre during the 18th and 19th centuries, under Maratha rule. The figure depicts a Tanjore painting from this era. From the collection of the V&A Museum.

The Vijayanagar Empire declined in 1565 defeated by the Deccan sultans in the Battle of Talikota. The local Nayak governors declared independence and began to rule, forming their own dynasties. The Nayaks of Madurai and Thanjavur were the most prominent of them. Ragunatha Nayak (1600–1645) was the greatest of the Thanjavur Nayaks. Raghunatha Nayak encouraged trade and permitted a Danish settlement in 1620 at Tarangambadi in Mayiladuthurai district. This laid the foundation of future European involvement in the affairs of the country. The success of the Dutch inspired the English to seek trade with Thanjavur, which was to lead to far-reaching repercussions. Vijaya Raghava (1631–1676) was the last of the Thanjavur Nayaks. Nayaks reconstructed some of the oldest temples in the country and their contributions can be seen even today. Nayaks expanded the existing temples with large pillared halls, and tall gateway towers, which is representative of the religious architecture of this period.

In Madurai, Thirumalai Nayak was the most famous Nayak ruler. He patronised art and architecture creating new structures and expanding the existing landmarks in and around Madurai. On Thirumalai Nayak's death in 1659, the Madurai Nayak kingdom began to break up. His successors were weak rulers and invasions of Madurai recommenced. The Nayakas manned their forces with primarily Kallar and Marava warriors.

== Tondaiman period (1680–1948) ==
Pudukkottai was a kingdom and later a princely state in British India, which existed from 1680 until 1948. It was one of the very few regions of Tamil Nadu not to be colonized by the British. The Kingdom of Pudukkottai was founded in about 1680 as a feudatory of Ramnad and grew with subsequent additions from Tanjore, Sivaganga and Ramnad. One of the staunch allies of the British East India Company in the Carnatic, Anglo-Mysore and Polygar Wars, the kingdom was brought under the Company's protection in 1800 as per the system of Subsidiary Alliance. The state was placed under the control of the Madras Presidency from 1800 until 1 October 1923, when the Madras States Agency was abolished, and until 1948 it was under the political control of the Government of India.

Pudukkottai State covered a total area of 1,178 square miles (3,050 km2) and had a population of 438,648 in 1941. It extended over the whole of the present-day Pudukkottai district of Tamil Nadu (with the exception of Aranthangi taluk which was then a part of Tanjore district). The town of Pudukkottai was its capital.

List of kings of Pudukkottai

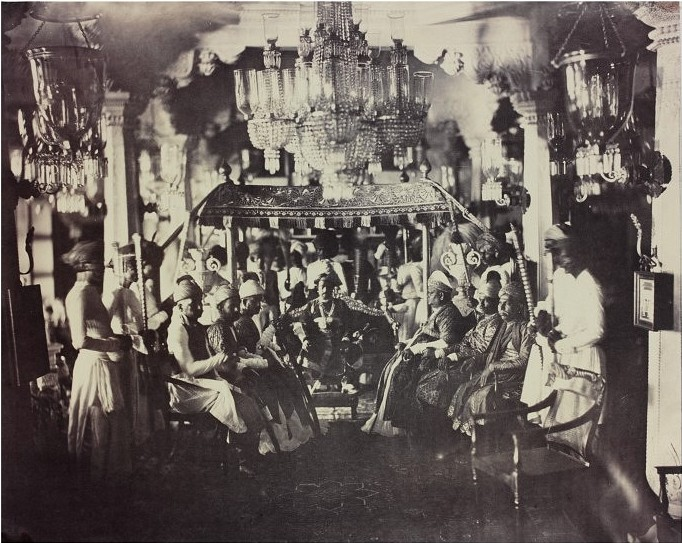
Ramachandra Tondaiman, king of Pudukkottai, at his durbar, ca. 1858

- Raghunatha Raya Tondaiman (1686–1730)
- Vijaya Raghunatha Raya Tondaiman I (1730–1769)
- Raya Raghunatha Tondaiman (1769– December 1789)
- Vijaya Raghunatha Tondaiman (December 1789 – 1 February 1807)
- Vijaya Raghunatha Raya Tondaiman II (1 February 1807 – June 1825)
- Raghunatha Tondaiman (June 1825 – 13 July 1839)
- Ramachandra Tondaiman (13 July 1839 – 15 April 1886)
- Martanda Bhairava Tondaiman (15 April 1886 – 28 May 1928)
- Rajagopala Tondaiman (28 October 1928 – 1 March 1948)

== Maratha influences (1676–1855) ==
In 1676, Shivaji Bhonsle, the first Maratha Chhatrapati, started a campaign in present-day Tamil Nadu. Shivaji had conquered important forts like Gingee and Vellore by 1678. Ekoji Bhonsle, the paternal half brother of Shivaji, established his own rule in Thanjavur. This particular Bhonsle dynasty ruled Thanjavur until 1855, when the kingdom was annexed by the British Raj.

Gingee served as the Maratha capital for nine years during the 27-year Mughal-Maratha war, starting after the death of Chhatrapati Sambhaji. The Mughals captured Gingee in 1698.

== Rule of Poligars, Nizams and Nawabs ==
European settlements began to appear in the Tamil country during the Vijayanagara Empire. In 1605, the Dutch established trading posts in the Coromandel Coast near Gingee and in Pulicat. The British East India Company built a 'factory' (warehouse) at Armagaon (Durgarazpatnam), a village around 35 miles (56 km) North of Pulicat, as the site in 1626. In 1639, Francis Day, one of the officers of the company, secured the rights over a three-mile (5 km) long strip of land a fishing village called Madraspatnam from the Damarla Venkatadri Nayakudu, the Nayak of Vandavasi. The East India Company built Fort St George and castle on an approximate five square kilometre sand strip. This was the start of the town of Madras. The coromandel coast was ruled by the Vijayanagara King (Aravidu Dynasty), Peda Venkata Raya, based in Chandragiri and Vellore Fort. With his approval the English began to exercise sovereign rights over their strip of land.

During the Maratha rule of Thanjavur. After Ekoji, his three sons namely Shaji, Serfoji I, Thukkoji alias Thulaja I ruled Thanjavur. The greatest of the Maratha rulers was Serfoji II (1798–1832 ). Serfoji devoted his life to the pursuit of culture and Thanjavur became renowned as a seat of learning. Serfoji's patronised art and literature and built the Saraswati Mahal Library at his palace. The incursion of the Muslim armies from the north forced a southward migration of Hindus from the central Deccan and the Andhra countries to seek shelter under the Nayak and the Maratha kings. The famous Carnatic music composer Tyagaraja (1767–1847), along with the Trinity of Carnatic music flourished in the Thanjavur district during this time.

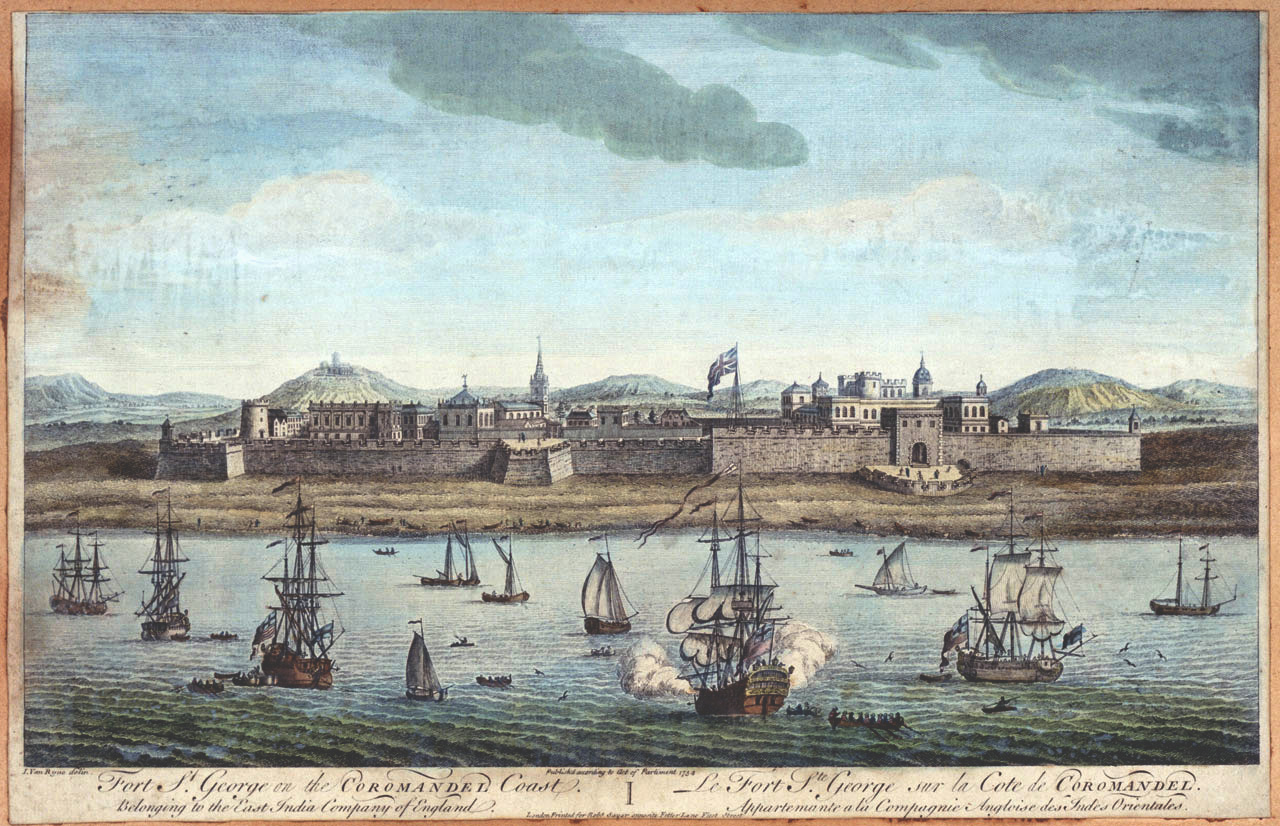
Fort St. George, Chennai (18th century etching)

With the demise of the Mughal Emperor Aurangzeb in 1707, his empire dissolved amidst numerous succession wars and the vassals of the empire began to assert their independence. The administration of the southern districts of Tamil Nadu was fragmented with hundreds of Polygars or Palayakkarars governing a few villages each. These local chieftains often fought amongst each other over territory. This turned the political situation in the Tamil country and in South India in general into confusion and chaos. The European traders found themselves in a situation where they could exploit the prevailing confusion to their own advantage.

== European influences ==
=== Anglo-French conflicts ===
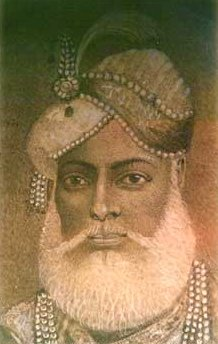
Mohamed Ali Khan Wallajah, Nawab of the Carnatic (1717–1795)

The French were relative newcomers to India. The French East India Company was formed in 1664 and in 1666 the French representatives obtained Aurangzeb's permission to trade in India. The French soon set up trading posts at Pondicherry on the Coromandel coast. They occupied Karaikal in 1739 and Joseph François Dupleix was appointed Governor of Pondichéry. In Europe the War of the Austrian Succession began in 1740 and eventually the British and the French forces in India were caught up in the conflict. There were numerous naval battles between the two navies along the Coromandel coast. The French led by La Bourdonnais attacked the poorly defended Fort St. George in Madras in 1746 and occupied it. Robert Clive was one of the prisoners of war from this battle. The war in Europe ended in 1748 and with the peace of Aix-la-Chapelle Madras was restored to the British.

The conflict between the British and the French continued, this time in political rather than military terms. Both the Nawab of the Carnatic and Nizam of Hyderabad positions were taken by rulers who were strongly sympathetic to the French. Chanda Sahib had been made Nawab of the Carnatic with Dupleix's assistance, while the British had taken up the cause of the previous incumbent, Mohammed Ali Khan Walajah. In the resultant battle between the rivals, Clive assisted Mohammed Ali by attacking Chanda Sahib's fort in Arcot and took possession of it in 1751. The French assisted Chanda Sahib in his attempts to drive Clive out of Arcot. However, the large Arcot army assisted by the French was defeated by the British. The Treaty of Paris (1763) formally confirmed Mahommed Ali as the Nawab of the Carnatic. It was a result of this action and the increased British influence that in 1765 the Emperor of Delhi issued a firman (decree) recognising the British possessions in southern India.

=== British Government control ===
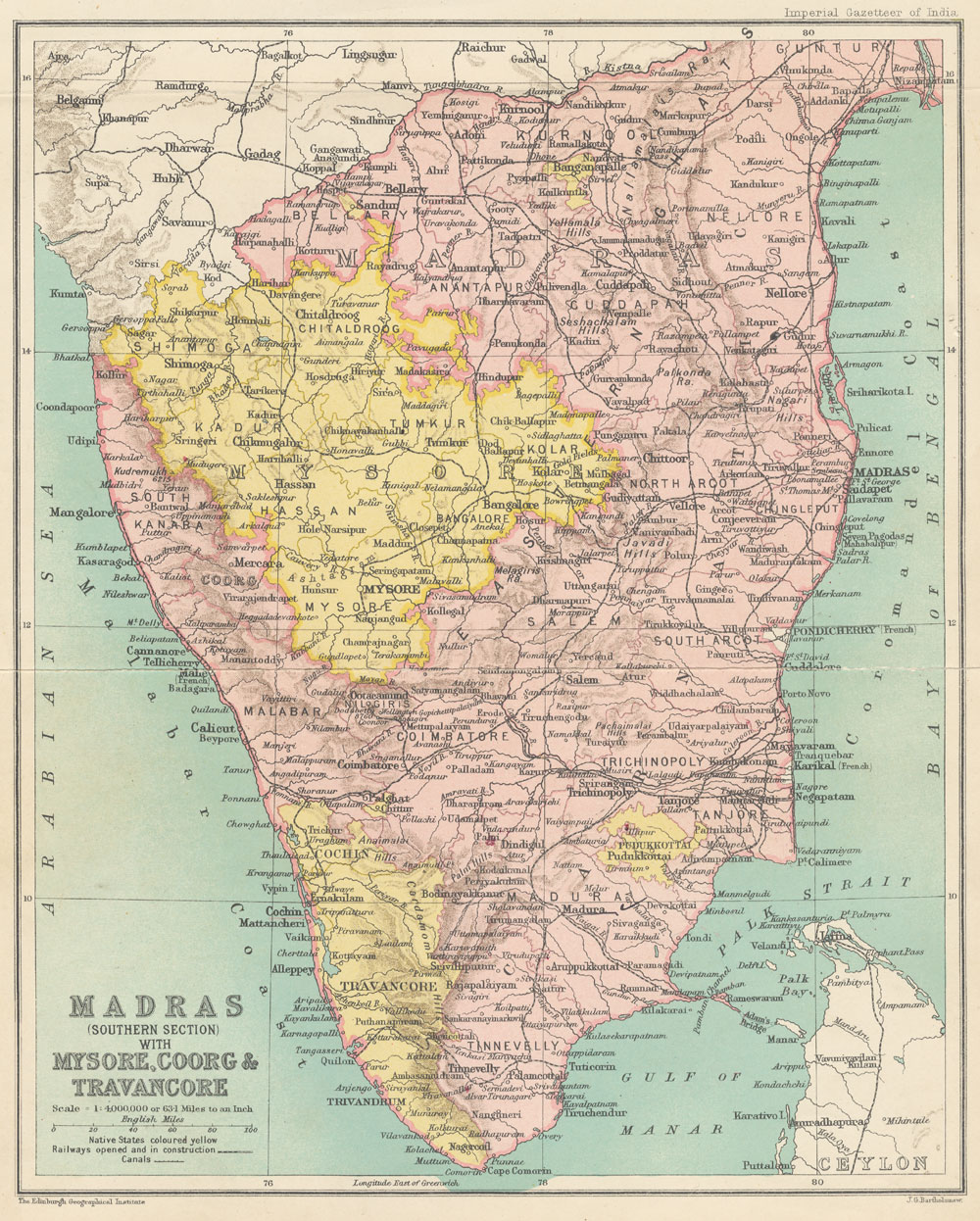
Madras Presidency, 1909

Although the company was becoming increasingly bold and ambitious in putting down resisting states, it was getting clearer day by day that the company was incapable of governing the vast expanse of the captured territories. Opinion amongst the members of the British Parliament urged the government to control the activities of the company. The company's financial position was also bad and it had to apply for a loan from Parliament. Seizing this opportunity, the Parliament passed the East India Company Act 1773 (13 Geo. 3. c. 63). The act set down regulations to control the company board and created the position of the Governor General. Warren Hastings was appointed the first Governor-General. In 1784 Pitt's East India Company Act 1784 (24 Geo. 3. Sess. 2. c. 25) made the company subordinate to the British Government.

The next few decades were of rapid growth and expansion in the territories controlled by the British. The Anglo-Mysore Wars of 1766 to 1799 and the Anglo-Maratha Wars of 1772 to 1818 put the Company in control of most of India. In a sign of the early resistance against the English control, the Palayakkarar chieftains of the old Madurai Kingdom, who had independent authority over their territories, ran into a conflict with the company officials over tax collection. Kattabomman, a local Palayakkarar chieftain in the Tirunelveli district, rebelled against the taxes imposed by the company administration in the 1790s. After the First Polygar War (1799–1802), he was captured and hanged in 1799. A year later, Oomaithurai continued the resistance against the East India Company. In the first Poligar war, he was captured and imprisoned in Palayamkottai Central Prison. In February 1801, he escaped and rebuilt the Panchalankurichi fort which had been razed in the first war. In the second Poligar war that followed, Oomaithurai allied himself with Maruthu brothers who ruled Sivagangai and was part of a grand alliance against the company which included Dheeran Chinnamalai and Kerala Verma. The company forces led by Lt. Colonel Agnew laid siege to the Panchalankurichi fort and captured it in May 1801 after a prolonged siege and artillery bombardment. Oomaithurai escaped the fall of the fort and joined Marudu brothers at their jungle fort at Kalayar Kovil. The company forces pursued him there and eventually captured Kalayar Kovil in October 1801. Oomaithurai along with the Marudu brothers was hanged on 16 November 1801.

In 1798 Lord Wellesley became the Governor-General. In the course of the next six years, Wellesley made vast conquests and doubled the company's territory. He shut out the French from further acquisitions in India, destroyed several ruling powers in the Deccan and the Carnatic, took the Mughal Emperor under the company's protection and compelled Serfoji, the king of Thanjavur to cede control of his kingdom. The Madras Presidency was established so that the territory under direct company control could be administered effectively. The direct administration began to cause resentment among the people. In 1806 the soldiers of the Vellore cantonment rebelled when William Bentinck, the Governor of Madras decreed that the native soldiers should abandon all caste marks. Fearing this act to be an attempt of forceful conversion to Christianity, the soldiers mutinied. The rebellion was suppressed but 114 British officers were killed and several hundred mutineers executed. Bentinck was recalled in disgrace.

=== End of Company rule ===
The simmering discontent in the various districts of the company territories exploded in 1857 into the Sepoy war. Although the rebellion had a huge impact on the state of the colonial power in India, Tamil Nadu was mostly unaffected by it. As a consequence of the war, the British Government enacted the Act of 1858 to abolish the powers of the Company and transfer the government to the Crown.

== British rule (1858–1947) ==
In 1858 the British Crown assumed direct rule in India. During the early years, the government was autocratic in many ways. The opinion of Indians in their own affairs was not considered by Britain as important. However, in due course, the British Raj began to allow Indians participation in local government. Viceroy Ripon passed a resolution in 1882, which gave a greater and more real share in local government to the people. Further legislation such as the 1892 Indian councils Act and the 1909 "Minto–Morley Reforms" eventually led to the establishment of the Madras Legislative Council. The non-cooperation movement started under Mahatma Gandhi's leadership led the British government to pass the Government of India Act (also known as Montagu–Chelmsford Reforms) of 1919. The first elections were held for the local assemblies in 1921.

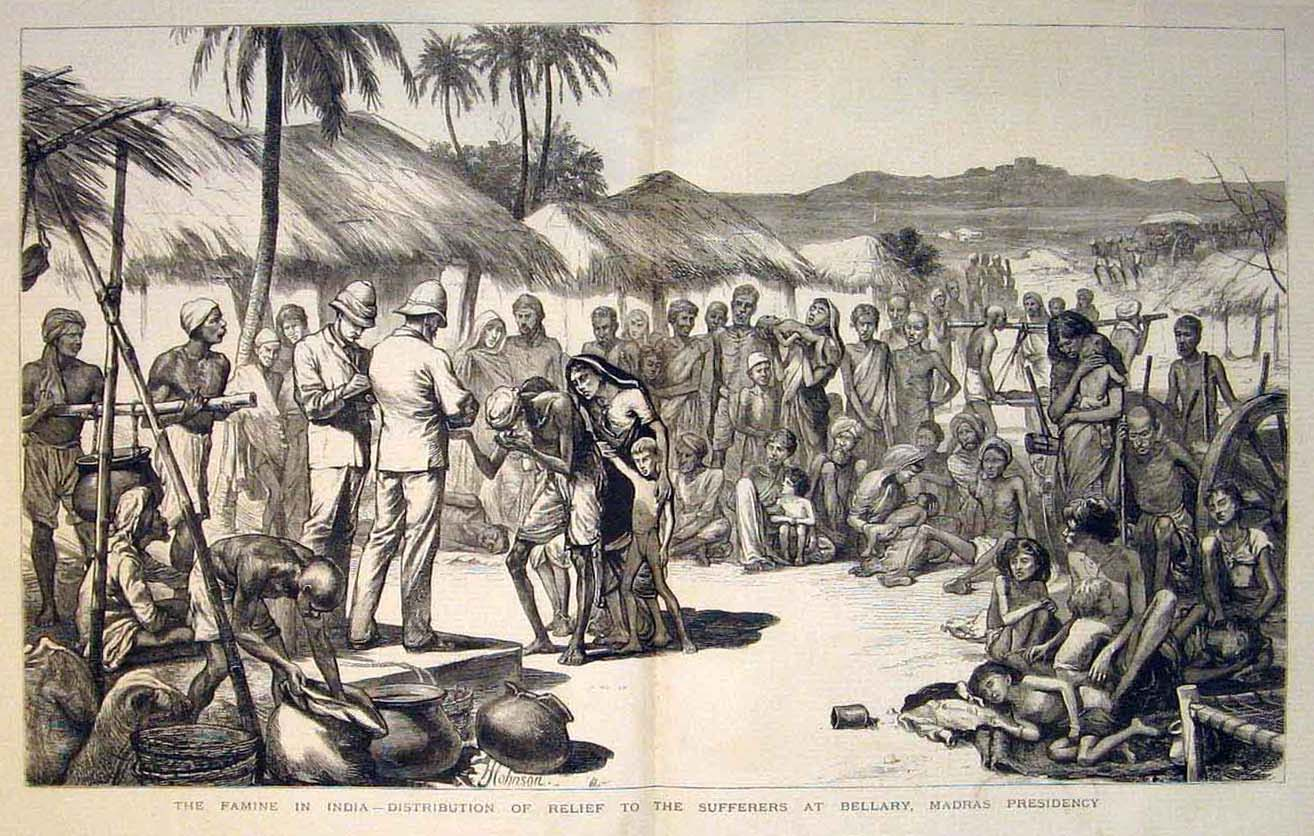
Madras famine (1877). Distribution of relief. From the Illustrated London News (1877)

Failure of the summer monsoons and administrative shortcomings of the Ryotwari system resulted in a severe famine in the Madras Presidency during 1876–1877. The government and several charitable institutions organised relief work in the city and the suburbs. Funds were also raised from Europeans in India and overseas for the famine relief. Humanitarians such as William Digby wrote angrily about the woeful failure of the British administration to act promptly and adequately in response to the wholesale suffering caused by the famine. When the famine finally ended with the return of the monsoon in 1878, between three and five million people had perished. In response to the devastating effects of the famine, the government organised a Famine Commission in 1880 to define the principles of disaster relief. The government also instituted a famine insurance grant, setting aside 1.5 million Rupees. Other civic works such as canal building and improvements in roads and railway were also undertaken to minimise the effects of any future famines.

=== Independence struggle ===
The growing desire for independence began to gradually gather pace in the country and its influence in Tamil Nadu generated a number of volunteers to the fight against the British colonial power in the struggle for Independence. Notable amongst these are Tiruppur Kumaran, who was born in 1904 in a small village near Erode. Kumaran lost his life during a protest march against the British. The location of the French colony of Pondichéry, offered a place of refuge for the fugitives freedom fighters trying to flee the British Police. Aurobindo was one such living in Pondicherry in 1910. The poet Subramania Bharati was a contemporary of Aurobindo. Bharathi wrote numerous poems in Tamil extolling the revolutionary cause. He also published the journal India from Pondicherry. Both Aurobindo and Bharathi were associated with other Tamil revolutionaries like V. O. Chidambaram Pillai. Tamils formed a significant percentage of the members of the Indian National Army (INA), founded by Subhas Chandra Bose to fight the British occupation in India. Lakshmi Sahgal from Tamil Nadu was a prominent leader in the INA's Rani of Jhansi Regiment.

In 1916 Dr. T. M. Nair and Rao Bahadur Thygaraya Chetty released the Non-Brahmin Manifesto sowing the seeds for the Dravidian movements. During the 1920s, two movements focused mainly on regional politics began in Tamil Nadu. One was the Justice Party, which won the local legislative elections held in 1921. The Justice Party was not focused on the Indian independence movement, rather on local issues such as affirmative action for socially backward groups. The other main movement was the anti-religious, anti-Brahmin, Self-Respect Movement led by E. V. Ramasami. Further steps towards eventual self-rule were taken in 1935 when the British Government passed the All-India Federation Act of 1935. Fresh local elections were held and in Tamil Nadu the Congress party captured power defeating the Justice party. In 1938, Ramasami with C. N. Annadurai launched an agitation against the Congress ministry's decision to introduce the teaching of Hindi in schools.

== Post Independence period ==
The political state of Tamil Nadu in India was created in 1969 when erstwhile Madras State was renamed.

The trauma of the partition did not impact Tamil Nadu when India was granted Independence in 1947. There was no sectarian violence against various religions. There had always been an atmosphere of mutual respect and peaceful coexistence between all religions in Tamil Nadu. Congress formed the first ministry in the Madras Presidency. C. Rajagopalachari (Rajaji) was the first Chief Minister. Madras Presidency was eventually reconstituted as Madras State. Following agitations for a separate Andhra state comprising the Telugu-speaking regions of the Madras state by Potti Sriramalu, the Indian Government decided to partition the Madras state. In 1953 Rayalaseema and the coastal Andhra regions became the new state of Andhra Pradesh and the Bellary district became part of the Mysore state. In 1956 south Kanara district was transferred to Mysore, the Malabar coastal districts became part of the new state of Kerala, and the Madras state assumed its present shape. The Madras state was named Tamil Nadu (literally The Land of Tamils or Tamil Country) in 1969.

The Sri Lankan Civil War during the 1970s and the 80s saw large numbers of Sri Lankan Tamils fleeing to Tamil Nadu. The plight of Tamil refugees caused a surge of support from most of the Tamil political parties. They exerted pressure on the Indian government to intercede with the Sri Lankan government on behalf of the Sri Lankan Tamilians. However, LTTE lost much of its support from Tamil Nadu following the assassination of Rajiv Gandhi on 21 May 1991 by an operative from Sri Lanka for the former prime minister's role in sending Indian peacekeepers to Sri Lanka to disarm the LTTE.

The east coast of Tamil Nadu was one of the areas affected by the 2004 Indian Ocean Tsunami, during which almost 8000 people died in the disaster. The sixth most populous state in the Indian Union, Tamil Nadu was the seventh-largest economy in 2005 among the states of India. The growing demands for skilled labour has caused increased number of educational institutions in Tamil Nadu. The widespread application of caste-based affirmative action caused the state to have 69% of all educational and employment vacancies to be reserved to Scheduled Castes, Scheduled Tribes and Other Backward Classes. Such caste-based reservations have huge public support in Tamil Nadu, with no popular protests organised against its implementation.

Since the 1990s, Tamil Nadu has experienced significant economic growth, especially in the service sector, and has had significant increases in development indicators. Kalaiyarasan (2014) attributes this to the strong welfare measures implemented by successive state governments and a two-track focus on economic growth and grassroots development.

=== Evolution of regional politics ===
The politics of Tamil Nadu have gone through three distinct phases since independence. The domination of the Congress Party after 1947 gave way to the Dravidian populist mobilization in the 1960s. This phase lasted until the end of the 1990s. The most recent phase saw the fragmentation of the Dravidian political parties and led to the advent of political alliances and coalition governments. Annadurai formed the Dravida Munnetra Kazhagam (DMK) in 1949 after splitting from Dravidar Kazhagam. DMK also decided to oppose the 'expansion of the Hindi culture' in Tamil Nadu and started the demand for a separate homeland for the Dravidians in the South. The demand was for an Independent state called Dravida Nadu (country of Dravidians) comprising Tamil Nadu and parts of Andhra, Karnataka and Kerala. The increased involvement of the Indian National Congress party in Madras during the late 1950s and the strong pan-Indian emotions whipped up by the Sino-Indian War in 1962 led to the demand for Dravida Nadu losing some of its immediacy. Consequently, in 1963, when the Sixteenth Amendment to the Constitution of India, precluded secessionist parties from contesting elections, the DMK chose to formally drop its demand for an independent Dravida Nadu, focusing instead on securing greater functional autonomy within the framework of the Indian Constitution.

The Congress party, riding on the wave of public support stemming from the independence struggle, formed the first post-independence government in Tamil Nadu and continued to govern until 1967. In 1965 and 1968, DMK led widespread anti-Hindi agitations in the state against the plans of the Union Government to introduce Hindi in the state schools. Affirmative action in employment and educational institutions were pioneered in Tamil Nadu based on the demands of the Dravidian movement. The leadership of the Dravidian movement had very capable authors and literati in Annadurai and Karunanidhi, who assiduously utilised the popular media of stage plays and movies to spread its political messages. MG Ramachandran (MGR) who later became the Chief Minister of Tamil Nadu, was one such stage and movie actor.

In 1967 DMK won the state election. DMK split into two in 1971, with MGR forming the splinter All India Anna Dravida Munnetra Kazhagam (AIADMK). Since then these two parties have dominated the politics of Tamil Nadu. AIADMK, under MGR, retained control of the State Government over three consecutive assembly elections in 1977, 1980 and 1984. After MGR's death, AIADMK was split over the succession between various contenders. Eventually J. Jayalalithaa took over the leadership of AIADMK.

Several changes to the political balance in Tamil Nadu took place during the later half of the 1990s, eventually leading to the end of the duopoly of DMK and AIADMK in the politics of Tamil Nadu. In 1996, a split in the Congress party in Tamil Nadu eventuated in the formation of Tamil Maanila Congress (TMC). TMC aligned with the DMK, while another party Marumalarchi Dravida Munnetra Kazhagam (MDMK), which split from DMK aligned with the AIADMK. These and several smaller political parties began to gain popular support. The first instance of a 'grand alliance' was during the 1996 elections for the National parliament, during which the AIADMK formed a large coalition of a number of smaller parties to counter the electoral threat posed by the alliance between the DMK and TMC. Since then the formation of alliances of a large number of political parties has become an electoral practice in Tamil Nadu. The electoral decline of Congress party at the national level, which started during early 1990, forced the Congress to seek coalition partners from various states including Tamil Nadu. This paved the way for the Dravidian parties to be part of the Central Government.

In the 2001 elections, Jaylalithaa became Chief Minister again, but due to legal cases against her, the Chief Ministership was taken up by loyalist O. Paneerselvam until she returned 6 months later. In the 2006 assembly elections however, the DMK won a majority and Karunanidhi became chief minister. During the 2011 election however, the DMK was beset by anti-incumbency and anger over the 2G scam, and Jaylalithaa became Chief Minister again. Unlike the rest of India, the 2014 Lok Sabha elections resulted in no significant increase in support for the Bharatiya Janata Party in Tamil Nadu and the AIADMK swept the state. In 2016, Jaylalithaa won another term, but soon after taking office died of a heart attack. After her death, Paneerselvam served again as caretaker Chief Minister until he was expelled from the party by general secretary V. K. Sasikala. Then Edappadi Palaniswami, the newly-elected leader of the AIADMK legislature party, reached an agreement on chief ministership, and Palaniswami became chief minister in February 2017 with Paneerselvam as his deputy. In 2018, Karunanidhi died and was succeeded by his son M.K. Stalin as DMK leader and leader of the opposition. In the 2019 Lok Sabha elections, the DMK-led alliance swept the state winning 37 out of 38 seats. The alliance also won the 2021 Legislative Assembly election, with 159 out of 234 seats. As a result, M.K. Stalin became the Chief Minister.

== See also ==
- Chronology of Tamil history
- Tamil inscriptions
- Tamizhi
- Tamil Heritage Foundation
- The Tamils are an ancient people...
- Political history of medieval Karnataka
