= Vijaya Raghunatha Raya Tondaiman =

Vijaya Raghunatha Raya Tondaiman may refer to

- Vijaya Raghunatha Raya Tondaiman I (1713–1769), the ruler of Pudukkottai state from 1730 to 1769.
- Vijaya Raghunatha Raya Tondaiman II (1797–1825), the ruler of Pudukkottai state from 1807 to 1825.
