= Tamil dynasties =

Ancient kingdoms in South Asia

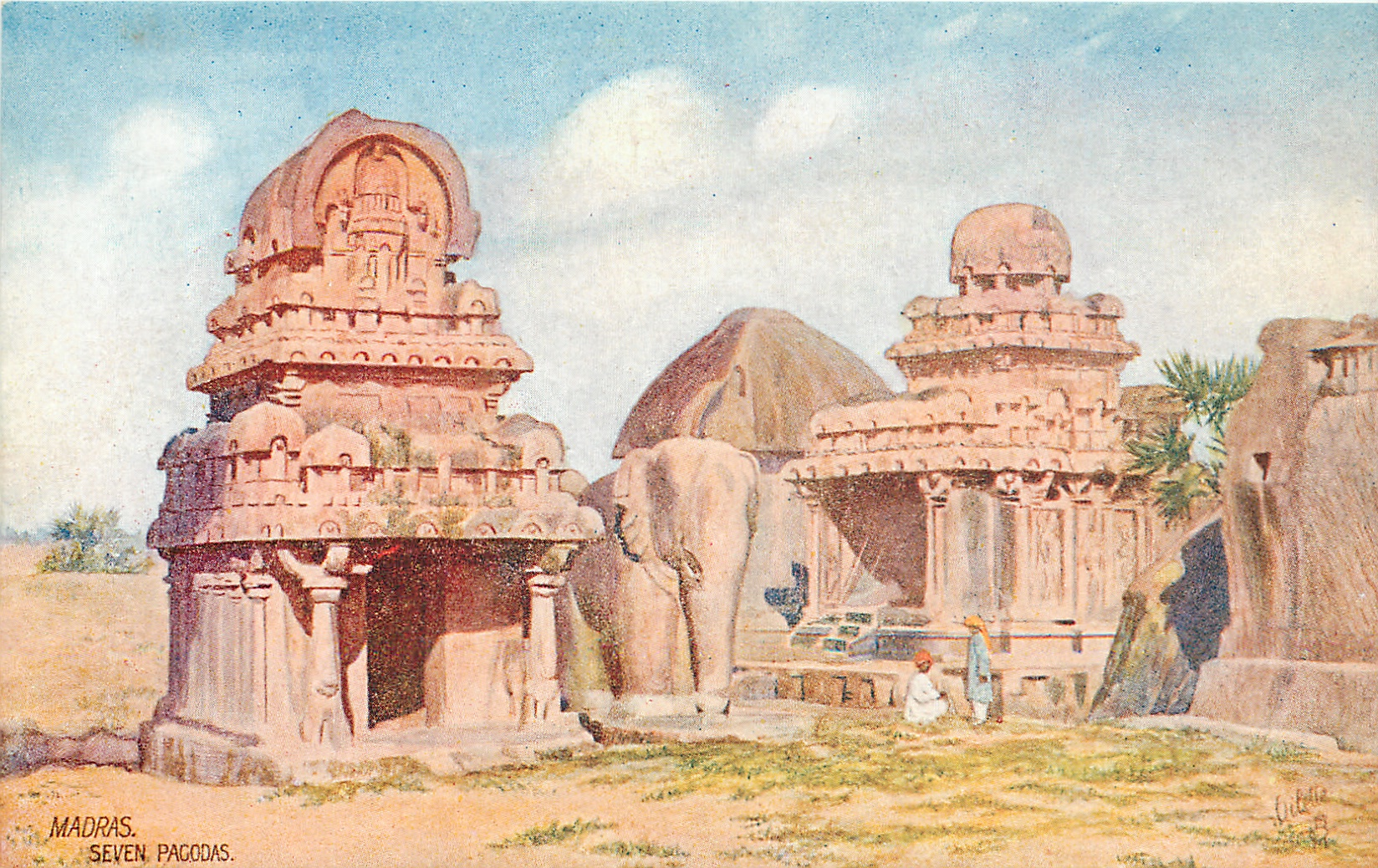
A painting of the Mahabalipuram Shore Temple, Chengalpattu, built by the Pallavas.

Tamil dynasties (தமிழ் பேரரசுகள்) are the kingdoms which ruled over present day Tamil Nadu and Kerala, occasionally extending to Andhra Pradesh, Karnataka, Odisha, as well as other parts of South and Southeast Asia, such as Sri Lanka. These include the Pallavas, the Pandyas, the Cholas and the Cheras, among others.

The medieval period of the history of Tamil Nadu saw the rise and fall of many kingdoms, some of whom went on to the extent of empires, exerting influences both in India and overseas. The Cholas who were very active during the Sangam age were entirely absent during the first few centuries. The period started with the rivalry between the Pandyas and the Pallavas, which in turn caused the revival of the Cholas. The Cholas went on to become a great power. Their decline saw the brief resurgence of the Pandyas. This period was also that of the re-invigorated Hinduism during which temple building and religious literature were at their best.

== History ==
=== Pallava dynasty ===
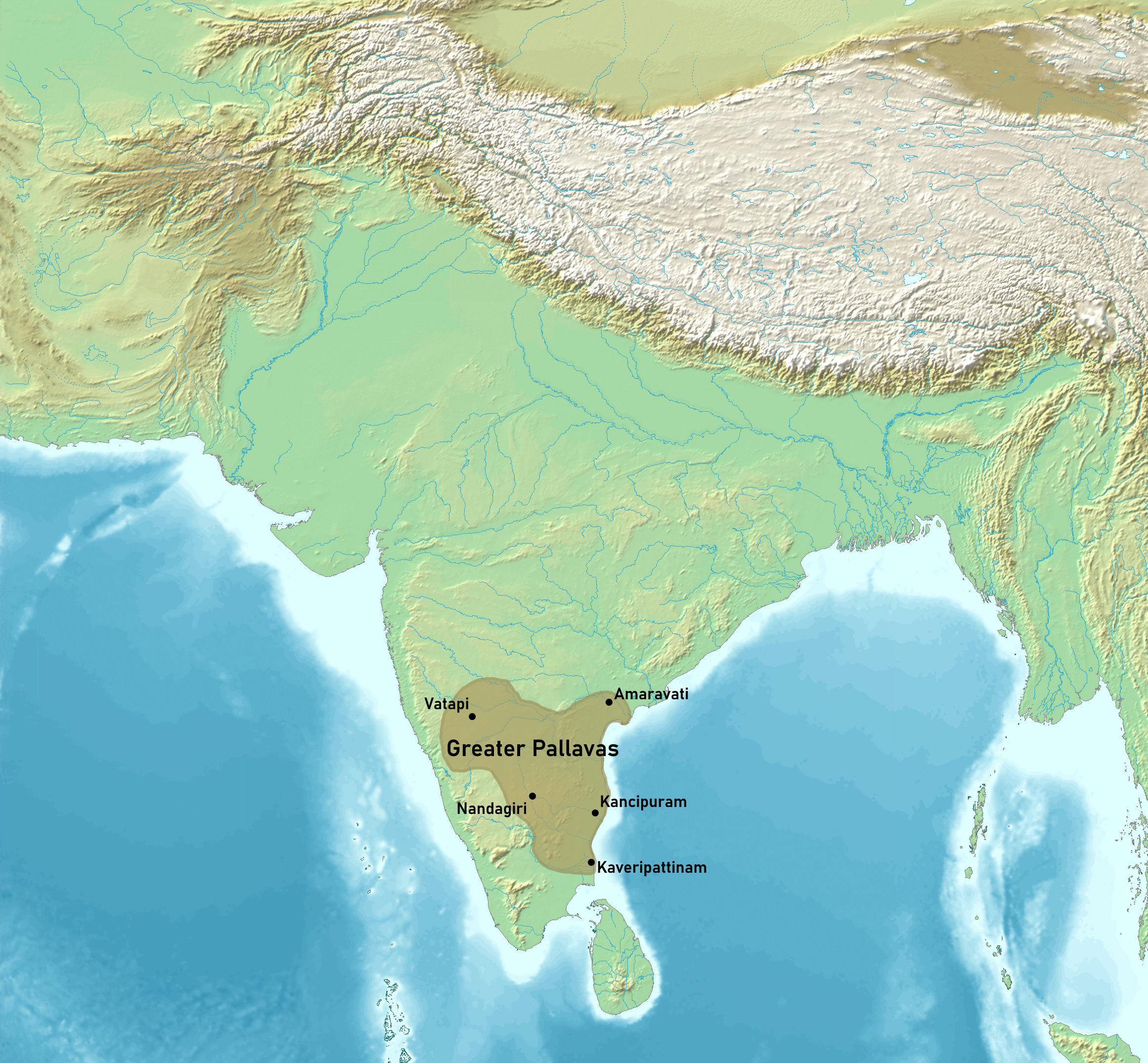
Greatest extent of Pallava Empire, during the reign of Narasimhavarman I (630-668 CE)

The Pallava dynasty, originating from Tondaimandalam, was an Indian dynasty that existed from 275 CE to 897 CE, ruling a significant portion of southern India. They gained prominence after the downfall of the Satavahana dynasty, with whom they had formerly served as feudatories.

The Pallavas became a major power during the reign of Mahendravarman I (600–630 CE) and Narasimhavarman I (630–668 CE), and dominated the southern Telugu Region and the northern parts of the Tamil region for about 600 years, until the end of the 9th century. Throughout their reign, they remained in constant conflict with both the Chalukyas of Badami in the north, and the Tamil kingdoms of Chola and Pandyas in the south. The Pallavas were finally defeated by the Chola ruler Aditya I in the 9th century CE.

The Pallavas are most noted for their patronage of architecture, the finest example being the Shore Temple, a UNESCO World Heritage Site in Mamallapuram. Kancheepuram served as the capital of the Pallava kingdom. The dynasty left behind magnificent sculptures and temples, and are recognised to have established the foundations of medieval South Indian architecture. They developed the Pallava script, from which Grantha ultimately took form. This script eventually gave rise to several other Southeast Asian scripts such Khmer. The Chinese traveller Xuanzang visited Kanchipuram during Pallava rule and extolled their benign rule.

=== Pandya dynasty ===
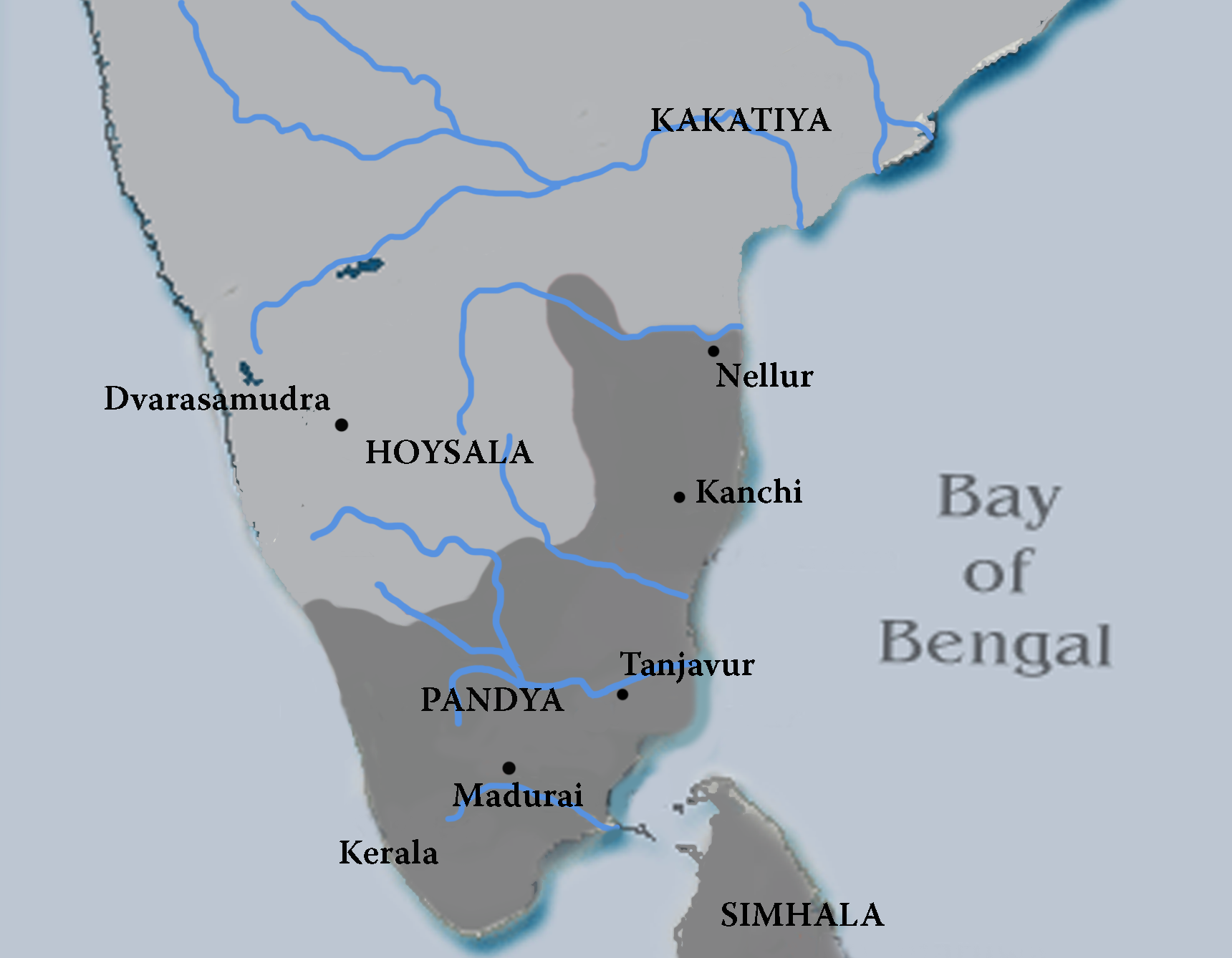
Pandyan Empire

The Pandya dynasty, also referred to as the Pandyas of Madurai, was an ancient dynasty of South India, and among the three great kingdoms of Tamilakam, the other two being the Cholas and the Cheras. Extant since at least the 4th to 3rd centuries BCE, the dynasty passed through two periods of imperial dominance, the 6th to 10th centuries CE, and under the 'Later Pandyas' (13th to 14th centuries CE). The Pandyas ruled extensive territories, at times including regions of present-day South India and northern Sri Lanka through vassal states subject to Madurai.

The rulers of the three Tamil dynasties were referred to as the "three crowned rulers (the mu-ventar) of the Tamil country". The origin and the timeline of the Pandya dynasty are difficult to establish. The early Pandya chieftains ruled their country (Pandya Nadu) from the ancient period, which included the inland city of Madurai and the southern port of Korkai. The Pandyas are celebrated in the earliest available Tamil poetry (Sangam literature"). Graeco-Roman accounts (as early as 4th century BCE), the edicts of Maurya emperor Ashoka, coins with legends in Tamil-Brahmi script, and Tamil-Brahmi inscriptions suggest the continuity of the Pandya dynasty from the 3rd century BCE to the early centuries CE. The early historic Pandyas faded into obscurity upon the rise of the Kalabhra dynasty in south India.

From the 6th century to the 9th century CE, the Chalukyas of Badami or Rashtrakutas of the Deccan, the Pallavas of Kanchi, and Pandyas of Madurai dominated the politics of south India. The Pandyas often ruled or invaded the fertile estuary of Kaveri (the Chola country), the ancient Chera country (Kongu and central Kerala) and Venadu (southern Kerala), the Pallava country and Sri Lanka. The Pandyas fell into decline with the rise of the Cholas of Thanjavur in the 9th century and were in constant conflict with the latter. The Pandyas allied themselves with the Sinhalese and the Cheras in harassing the Chola Empire until it found an opportunity for reviving its frontiers during the late 13th century.

The Pandyas entered their golden age under Maravarman I and Jatavarman Sundara Pandya I (13th century). Some early efforts by Maravarman I to expand into the ancient Chola country were effectively checked by the Hoysalas. Jatavarman I (c. 1251) successfully expanded the kingdom into the Telugu country (as far north as Nellore), south Kerala, and conquered northern Sri Lanka. The city of Kanchi became a secondary capital of the Pandyas. Maravarman Kulasekhara I (1268) defeated an alliance of the Hoysalas and the Cholas (1279) and invaded Sri Lanka. The venerable Tooth Relic of the Buddha was carried away by the Pandyas. During this period, the rule of the kingdom was shared among several royals, one of them enjoying primacy over the rest. An internal crisis in the Pandya kingdom coincided with the Khalji invasion of south India in 1310–11. The ensuing political crisis saw more sultanate raids and plunder, the loss of south Kerala (1312), and north Sri Lanka (1323) and the establishment of the Madurai sultanate (1334). The Pandyas of Ucchangi (9th–13th century), in the Tungabhadra Valley were related to the Pandyas of Madurai.

According to tradition, the legendary Sangams ("the Academies") were held in Madurai under the patronage of the Pandyas, and some of the Pandya rulers claimed to be poets themselves. Pandya Nadu was home to a number of renowned temples, including the Meenakshi Temple in Madurai. The revival of the Pandya power by Kadungon (7th century CE) coincided with the prominence of the Shaivite nayanars and the Vaishnavite alvars.

=== Chola dynasty ===
Chola Empire under Rajendra Chola (c. 1030).

The Chola dynasty was a Tamil thalassocratic empire of southern India, one of the longest-ruling dynasties in the world history. The earliest datable references to the Chola are in inscriptions from the 3rd century BCE left by Ashoka, of the Maurya Empire. As one of the Three Crowned Kings of Tamilakam, along with the Chera and Pandya, the dynasty continued to govern over varying territory until the 13th century CE. Despite these ancient origins, the period when it is appropriate to speak of a "Chola Empire" only begins with the medieval Cholas in the mid-9th century CE when Vijayalaya Chola, the successor of Srikantha Chola captured Thanjavur from the Pandyas.

The heartland of the Cholas was the fertile valley of the Kaveri River, but they ruled a significantly larger area at the height of their power from the later half of the 9th century till the beginning of the 13th century. The whole country south of the Tungabhadra was united and held as one state for a period of three centuries and more between 907 and 1215 CE. Under Rajaraja I and his successors Rajendra I, Rajadhiraja I, Rajendra II, Virarajendra, and Kulothunga Chola I, the dynasty became a military, economic and cultural power in South Asia and South-East Asia. The power of the new empire was proclaimed to the eastern world by the expedition to the Ganges which Rajendra Chola I undertook and by naval raids on cities of the city-state of Srivijaya, as well as by the repeated embassies to China. The Chola fleet represented the zenith of ancient Indian maritime capacity.

During the period 1010–1153, the Chola territories stretched from the islands of the Maldives in the south to as far north as the banks of the Godavari River in Andhra Pradesh. Rajaraja Chola conquered peninsular South India, annexed parts of which is now Sri Lanka and occupied the islands of the Maldives. Rajendra Chola sent a victorious expedition to North India that touched the river Ganges and defeated the Pala ruler of Pataliputra, Mahipala. In 1025, he also successfully invaded cities of Srivijaya of Malaysia and Indonesia. The Chola invasion ultimately failed to install direct administration over Srivijaya, since the invasion was short and only meant to plunder the wealth of Srivijaya. Chola rule or influence on Srivijava would last until 1070 when the Cholas began to lose almost all of their overseas territories. The Later Cholas (1070–1279) would still rule portions of Southern India. The Chola dynasty went into decline at the beginning of the 13th century with the rise of the Pandyan dynasty, which ultimately caused their downfall.

The Cholas left a lasting legacy. Their patronage of Tamil literature and their zeal in the building of temples has resulted in some great works of Tamil literature and architecture. The Chola kings were avid builders and envisioned the temples in their kingdoms not only as places of worship but also as centres of economic activity. They were also well known for their art, specifically temple sculptures and 'Chola bronzes', exquisite bronze sculptures of Hindu deities built in a lost wax process they pioneered; that continues (to a certain extent) to this day. They established a centralized form of government and a disciplined bureaucracy. The Chola school of art spread to Southeast Asia and influenced the architecture and art of Southeast Asia. The medieval Cholas are best known for the construction of the magnificent Brihadisvara temple at Thanjavur, commissioned by the most famous Chola king, Rajaraja Chola in 1010 CE.

=== Chera dynasty ===
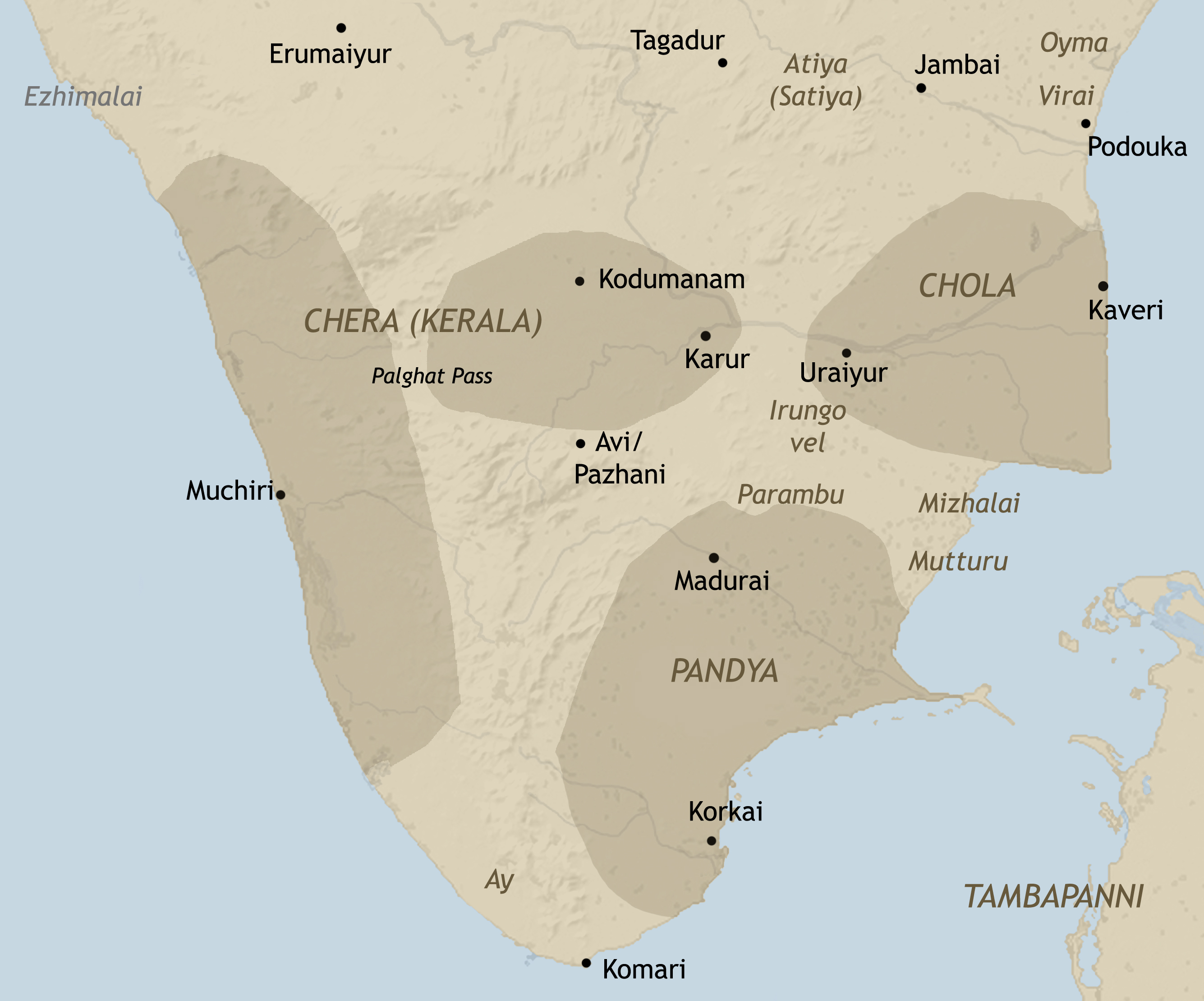
Chera Empire.

The Chera dynasty (Tamil: சேரர், Malayalam: ചേരൻ) (or Cēra), IPA: [t͡ʃeːɾɐ], was one of the principal lineages in the early history of the present day state of Kerala and some parts of Tamil Nadu in southern India. Together with the Cholas of Uraiyur (Tiruchirappalli) and the Pandyas of Madurai, the early Cheras were known as one of the three major powers (muventar) of ancient Tamilakam in the early centuries of the Common Era. The Cheras used the bow and arrow insignia during the Sangam era.

The Chera country was geographically well placed to profit from maritime trade via the extensive Indian Ocean networks. Exchange of spices, especially black pepper, with Middle Eastern and Graeco-Roman merchants are attested in several sources. The Cheras of the early historical period (c. second century BCE – c. third century CE) are known to have had their original centre at Karur in Kongu Nadu and harbours at Muchiri (Muziris), Nelcynda, and Thondi (Tyndis) on the Indian Ocean coast (Kerala). They governed the area of Malabar Coast between Alappuzha in the south to Kasaragod in the north. This included Palakkad Gap, Coimbatore, Dharapuram, Salem, and Kolli Hills. The region around Coimbatore was ruled by the Cheras during Sangam period between c. 1st and the 4th centuries CE and it served as the eastern entrance to the Palakkad Gap, the principal trade route between the Malabar Coast and Tamil Nadu. However the southern region of present-day Kerala state (The coastal belt between Thiruvananthapuram and southern Alappuzha) was under Ay dynasty, which was more related to the Pandya dynasty of Madurai.

The early historic pre-Pallava Tamil polities are often described as a "kinship-based redistributive economies" largely shaped by "pastoral-cum-agrarian subsistence" and "predatory politics". Tamil Brahmi cave label inscriptions, describe Ilam Kadungo, son of Perum Kadungo, and the grandson of Ko Athan Cheral of the Irumporai clan. Inscribed portrait coins with Brahmi legends give a number of Chera names. Reverse of these coins often contained the Chera bow and arrow symbol. The anthologies of early Tamil texts are a major source of information about the early Cheras. Chenguttuvan, or the Good Chera, is famous for the traditions surrounding Kannaki, the principal female character of the Tamil epic poem Chilapathikaram. After the end of the early historical period, around the 3rd–5th century CE, there seems to be a period when the Cheras' power declined considerably.

The Cheras of the Kongu country are known to have controlled western Tamil Nadu and central Kerala in early medieval period. Present-day central Kerala probably detached from Kongu Chera kingdom around 8th–9th century CE to form the Chera Perumal kingdom (c. 9th- 12th century CE). The exact nature of the relationships between the various branches of Chera rulers is somewhat unclear. Some of the major dynasties of medieval south India – Chalukya, Pallava, Pandya, Rashtrakuta, and Chola – seem to have conquered the Chera or Kerala country. The Kongu Cheras appear to have been absorbed into the Pandya political system by 10th/11th century CE. Even after the dissolution of the Perumal kingdom, royal inscriptions and temple grants, especially from outside Kerala proper, continued to refer the country and the people as the "Cheras or Keralas".

The rulers of Venad (the Venad Cheras or the "Kulasekharas"), based out of the port of Kollam in south Kerala, claimed their ancestry from the Perumals. Cheranad was also the name of an erstwhile province in the kingdom of Zamorin of Calicut, which had included parts of present-day Tirurangadi and Tirur Taluks of Malappuram district in it. Later it became a Taluk of Malabar District, when Malabar came under the British Raj. The headquarters of Cheranad Taluk was the town of Tirurangadi. Later the Taluk was merged with Eranad Taluk. In the modern period the rulers of Cochin and Travancore (in Kerala) also claimed the title "Chera".

Timeline and cultural period	Indus plain (Punjab-Sapta Sindhu-Gujarat)	Gangetic Plain			Central India	Southern India
Timeline and cultural period	Indus plain (Punjab-Sapta Sindhu-Gujarat)	Upper Gangetic Plain (Ganga-Yamuna doab)	Middle Gangetic Plain	Lower Gangetic Plain	Central India	Southern India
IRON AGE
Culture	Late Vedic Period	Late Vedic Period; Painted Grey Ware culture	Late Vedic Period; Northern Black Polished Ware		Pre-history	
6th century BCE	Gandhara	Kuru-Panchala	Magadha		Adivasi (tribes)	Assaka
Culture	Persian-Greek influences	"Second Urbanisation"; Rise of Shramana movements Jainism - Buddhism - Ājīvika - Yoga			Pre-history	
5th century BCE	(Persian conquests)		Shaishunaga dynasty		Adivasi (tribes)	Assaka
4th century BCE	(Greek conquests)	Nanda empire				
HISTORICAL AGE
Culture	Spread of Buddhism				Pre-history	
3rd century BCE	Maurya Empire					Satavahana dynasty Sangam period (300 BCE – 200 CE); Early Cholas; Early Pandyan kingdom Cheras
Culture	Preclassical Hinduism (Note: Michaels (2004) p.39) - "Hindu Synthesis" (Note: Hiltebeitel (2002)) (ca. 200 BCE - 300 CE) (Note: Michaels (2004) p.39) (Note: Hiltebeitel (2002)); Epics - Puranas - Ramayana - Mahabharata - Bhagavad Gita - Brahma Sutras - Smarta Tradition; Mahayana Buddhism					
2nd century BCE	Indo-Greek Kingdom		Shunga Empire; Maha-Meghavahana Dynasty			Satavahana dynasty Sangam period (300 BCE – 200 CE); Early Cholas; Early Pandyan kingdom Cheras
1st century BCE	Indo-Greek Kingdom		Shunga Empire; Maha-Meghavahana Dynasty			Satavahana dynasty Sangam period (300 BCE – 200 CE); Early Cholas; Early Pandyan kingdom Cheras
1st century CE	Indo-Scythians; Indo-Parthians		Kuninda Kingdom			Satavahana dynasty Sangam period (300 BCE – 200 CE); Early Cholas; Early Pandyan kingdom Cheras
2nd century	Kushan Empire					Satavahana dynasty Sangam period (300 BCE – 200 CE); Early Cholas; Early Pandyan kingdom Cheras
3rd century	Kushano-Sasanian Kingdom; Western Satraps	Kushan Empire		Kamarupa kingdom	Adivasi (tribes)	Satavahana dynasty Sangam period (300 BCE – 200 CE); Early Cholas; Early Pandyan kingdom Cheras
Culture	"Golden Age of Hinduism"(ca. CE 320-650) (Note: Michaels (2004) p.40); Puranas - Kural; Co-existence of Hinduism and Buddhism					
4th century	Kidarites	Gupta Empire; Varman dynasty				Andhra Ikshvakus; Kalabhra dynasty Kadamba Dynasty; Western Ganga Dynasty
5th century	Hephthalite Empire	Alchon Huns				Vishnukundina; Kalabhra dynasty
6th century	Nezak Huns; Kabul Shahi; Maitraka				Adivasi (tribes)	Vishnukundina; Badami Chalukyas; Kalabhra dynasty
Culture	Late-Classical Hinduism (ca. CE 650-1100) (Note: Michaels (2004) p.41); Advaita Vedanta - Tantra; Decline of Buddhism in India					
7th century	Indo-Sassanids		Vakataka dynasty Empire of Harsha	Mlechchha dynasty	Adivasi (tribes)	Badami Chalukyas; Eastern Chalukyas; Pandyan kingdom (revival); Pallava
7th century	Karkota dynasty				Adivasi (tribes)	
8th century	Kabul Shahi	Pala Empire			Adivasi (tribes)	Eastern Chalukyas; Pandyan kingdom Kalachuri
9th century	Gurjara-Pratihara				Adivasi (tribes)	Rashtrakuta Empire; Eastern Chalukyas; Pandyan kingdom Medieval Cholas; Chera Perumals of Makkotai
10th century	Ghaznavids			Pala dynasty Kamboja-Pala dynasty	Adivasi (tribes)	Kalyani Chalukyas; Eastern Chalukyas; Medieval Cholas; Chera Perumals of Makkotai; Rashtrakuta
References and sources for table References Sources: Flood, Gavin D. (1996), An Introduction to Hinduism, Cambridge University Press; Hiltebeitel, Alf (2002), Hinduism. In: Joseph Kitagawa, "The Religious Traditions of Asia: Religion, History, and Culture", Routledge; Michaels, Axel (2004), Hinduism. Past and present, Princeton, New Jersey: Princeton University Press
