= Avadai Raghunatha Tondaiman =

Kallar chieftain of Karambakudi (died 1661)

Raya Rahutta Raya Vajridu Raya Mannida Raya Avadai Raghunatha Tondaiman (died 1661) was a Kallar chieftain of Karambakudi and a feudatory of the Vijayanagar Empire.

== Ancestry and early life ==
Avadai Raghunatha Tondaiman was born in Karambakudi in the early 17th century. He traced his ancestry to Thirumalai Tondaiman, who migrated from Tirupathi in the region called Tondai Nadu or Tondaimandalam and settled at Anbukkoil.

== Career ==
In 1639, Avadai Raghunatha Tondaiman conquered the whole of the present-day Pudukkottai region for the Vijayanagar king Sriranga Raya III after defeating the reigning Pallavarayar dynasty. Sriranga Raya III granted him the title Raya Rahutta Raya Vajridu Raya Mannida Raya. Avadai Raghunatha Tondaiman died in 1661 in Pilaviduti and was succeeded to the chieftainship by his son, Raghunatha Raya Tondaiman who laid the foundation of the Pudukkottai kingdom.
