= Vijaya Raghunatha Tondaiman =

Raja of Pudukkottai from 1789 to 1807

Raja of Pudukkottai
- Reign: 30 December 1789 – 1 February 1807
- Coronation: 30 December 1789
- Predecessor: Raya Raghunatha Tondaiman
- Successor: Vijaya Raghunatha Raya Tondaiman II
- Born: May 1759; Pudukkottai, Pudukkottai state
- Died: 1 February 1807 (aged 47); Pudukkottai
- House: Pudukkottai
- Father: Thirumalai Raya Tondaiman

Raja Sri Vijaya Raghunatha Tondaiman Bahadur (c May 1759 – 1 February 1807) was the ruler of the Pudukkottai kingdom from 30 December 1789 to 1 February 1807.

== Early life ==
Vijaya Raghunatha Tondaiman was born in May 1759 to Thirumalai Raya Tondaiman Sahib.

== Reign ==
Vijaya Raghunatha Tondaiman succeeded to the throne on the death of his first cousin, Raya Raghunatha Tondaiman, the Raja of Pudukkottai without any male heirs. Vijaya Raghunatha's reign was a period of incessant wars in South India. Vijaya Raghunatha supported the British in the wars and in return for his services, he was given the title "Raja Bahadur" by Muhammed Ali Khan Wallajah, the Nawab of the Carnatic on 17 October 1796. End of September 1799, Veerapandiya Kattabomman who was on his way to Trichy to meet higher British officers to settle disputes stayed at his friend Vijaya Raghunatha's palace. To get on the good side of British, Vijaya Raghunatha betrayed his friend and wrote a letter to Major John Bannerman Polygar Wars leading to the capture and arrest of Veerapandiya Kattabomman and his brother Oomaithurai by the British. The British recognized his services by handing him the territory of Kilanilai in 1803.

The Thanjavur Maratha kingdom was annexed by the British East India Company in 1799, followed by the Ramnad and Sivaganga kingdoms which were reduced to the status of zamindari estates. The annexation of the Carnatic kingdom in 1801 made the British East India Company, the paramount power in South India. Pudukkottai was allowed to remain independent in recognition of the services the Tondaiman kings had rendered to the company.

== Family ==
Vijaya Raghunatha Tondaiman married Rani Brihannayaki Ayi Sahib and later, Rani Ayi Ammani Ayi Sahib. Vijaya Raghunatha Tondaiman had five sons of whom two survived him.

- Vijaya Raghunatha Tondaiman II (1797-1825)
- Raghunatha Tondaiman II (1798-1839)

== Death ==
Vijaya Raghunatha Tondaiman died on 1 February 1807 at the age of 47. The junior queen Rani Ayi Ammani Ayi Sahib committed sati.
