= Raghunatha Raya Tondaiman =

Raja of Pudukkottai from 1686 to 1730

Raja of Pudukkottai
- Reign: 1686 – April 1730
- Coronation: 1686
- Successor: Vijaya Raghunatha Raya Tondaiman I
- Born: 1641
- Died: April 1730 (aged 88–89); Pudukkottai
- House: Pudukkottai
- Father: Avadai Raghunatha Tondaiman

Raja Sri Raghunatha Raya Tondaiman (1641–1730) was the ruler of the Pudukkottai kingdom from 1686 to 1730. A feudatory chieftain of the Sethupathi of Ramnad, in 1686, Raghunatha Raya Tondaiman was recognised as the independent ruler of Pudukkottai by the Sethupathi for the services he had rendered him.

== Early life ==
Raghunatha Raya Tondaiman was born in 1641 to Avadai Raghunatha Tondaiman, a Kallar chieftain and army general in service of Sriranga III, a claimant to the Vijayanagar throne. For his braveness and military services, Avadai Raghunatha Tondaiman was given the title Raya Rahutta Raya Vajridu Raya Mannida Raya by Sriranga Raya in 1639 along with a grant of land. In 1640 along with the help of Sri Rangaraya, Avadai Tondaiman captured territories north of Vellar from Pallavarayar.

Raghunatha Raya Tondaiman was educated in private and succeeded to the chieftainship on the death of his father in 1661. In 1675, his possessions were confirmed by the Raja of Ramnad, Raghunatha Kilavan, who was his brother-in-law. Raghunatha Raya Tondaiman fought for the Raja of Ramnad who, in gratitude for his service, enlarged his dominions by granting him Thirumayam Fort and other estates in 1686 and allowed him to use the title "Raja of Pudukkottai".

== Reign ==
Raghunatha Raya Tondaiman reigned from 1686 to 1730 and strengthened the kingdom. He was an ally of Raghunatha Kilavan, the Raja of Ramnad. Following the Raja's death in 1720, Raghunatha Raya Tondaiman supported Tanda Deva against Bhavani Shankar, the candidate of Serfoji I of Thanjavur. Though, Bhavani Shankar took the throne after defeating Tanda Deva with Serfoji I's support, Serfoji I later switched sides and invaded the kingdom in 1723. Raghunatha Raya Tondaiman also supported the cause of Tanda Deva who was eventually successful. In 1730, Serfoji I promised the fortress of Kilanilai for his services but failed to keep his promise. Raghunatha Raya Tondaiman died in April 1730 and was succeeded by his grandson Vijaya Raghunatha Raya Tondaiman I.

== Family ==
Raghunatha Raya Tondaiman had six wives. Some of his children are:

- Periya Raya Tondaiman
- Chinna Raya Tondaiman
- Thirumalai Raya Tondaiman
- Muthu Vijaya Tondaiman
- Vijaya Tondaiman
- Rajkumari Periyanayaki Ammal Ayi Sahib
