= Raya Raghunatha Tondaiman =

Raja of Pudukkottai from 1769 to 1789

Raja of Pudukkottai
- Reign: 28 December 1769 – 30 December 1789
- Coronation: 28 December 1769
- Predecessor: Vijaya Raghunatha Raya Tondaiman I
- Successor: Vijaya Raghunatha Tondaiman
- Born: May 1738; Pudukkottai, Pudukkottai state
- Died: 30 December 1789 (aged 51); Pudukkottai
- House: Pudukkottai
- Father: Vijaya Raghunatha Raya Tondaiman I

Raja Sri Raya Raghunatha Tondaiman (c. May 1738 – 30 December 1789) was the ruler of Pudukkottai kingdom from 28 December 1769 to 30 December 1789.

== Early life ==
Raya Raghunatha Tondaiman was born in May 1738 to Vijaya Raghunatha Raya Tondaiman I and his wife Rani Nallakatti Ayi Sahib. He was the only son of the couple and was educated privately.

== Reign ==
Raya Raghunatha Tondaiman succeeded to the throne on the death of his father on 28 December 1769. His reign was largely uneventful. Raya Raghunatha Tondaiman authored a Telugu work Parvathi Parinyamu.

Raya Raghunatha Tondaiman died on 30 December 1789 after a reign of 20 years. In the absence of a male offspring, Raya Raghunatha Tondaiman was succeeded by his cousin, Vijaya Raghunatha Tondaiman.

== Family ==
Raya Raghunatha Tondaiman had eleven queens. He had only one offspring - a daughter

- Rajkumari Perumdevi Ammal Ayi Sahib
