= Vijaya Raghunatha Raya Tondaiman I =

Raja of Pudukkottai from 1713 to 1769

Raja of Pudukkottai
- Reign: April 1730 – 28 December 1769
- Coronation: April 1730
- Predecessor: Raghunatha Raya Tondaiman
- Successor: Raya Raghunatha Tondaiman
- Born: 25 August 1713; Pudukkottai, Pudukkottai state
- Died: 28 December 1769 (aged 56); Pudukkottai
- House: Pudukkottai
- Father: Thirumalai Raya Tondaiman

Vijaya Raghunatha Raya Tondaiman I (25 August 1713 – 28 December 1769) was the second independent ruler of the Pudukkottai kingdom. He reigned from April 1730 to 28 December 1769. His reign was marked with incessant wars with the Thanjavur Maratha kingdom and against the French East India Company and Chanda Sahib.

== Early life ==
Vijaya Raghunatha Raya Tondaiman I was born on 25 August 1713 to Thirumalai Raya Tondaiman Sahib, the heir-apparent of Pudukkottai and his wife, Nallayi Ayi Sahib and educated privately. On the death of his father in 1729, Vijaya Raghunatha Raya Tondaiman I was made heir-apparent by his grandfather, Raghunatha Raya Tondaiman, the Raja of Pudukkottai.

== Reign ==
Vijaya Raghunatha Raya Tondaiman I was crowned king at Kudumiyanmalai on the death of his grandfather, Raghunatha Raya Tondaiman, the Raja of Pudukkottai in 1730. Soon after his accession, a bloody civil war followed and Vijaya Raghunatha Raya Tondaiman I had to fight his uncles in order to secure his throne. In 1733, the Thanjavur Maratha general, Ananda Rao, invaded Pudukkottai and besieged Vijaya Raghunatha Raya Tondaiman I at the Thirumayam Fort for over a year destroying its defences and ravaging the town before returning.

When the Second Carnatic War broke out in 1750, Vijaya Raghunatha Raya Tondaiman I allied with the British East India Company and the Marathas against Chanda Sahib and the French. He supplied vital reinforcements to the British during the siege of Trichinopoly. In May 1754, he became the target of a French invasion which ravaged the kingdom.
