= Karaikudi metropolitan area =

Karaikudi Metropolitan Area Karaikudi Urban Agglomeration
- Metropolitan area
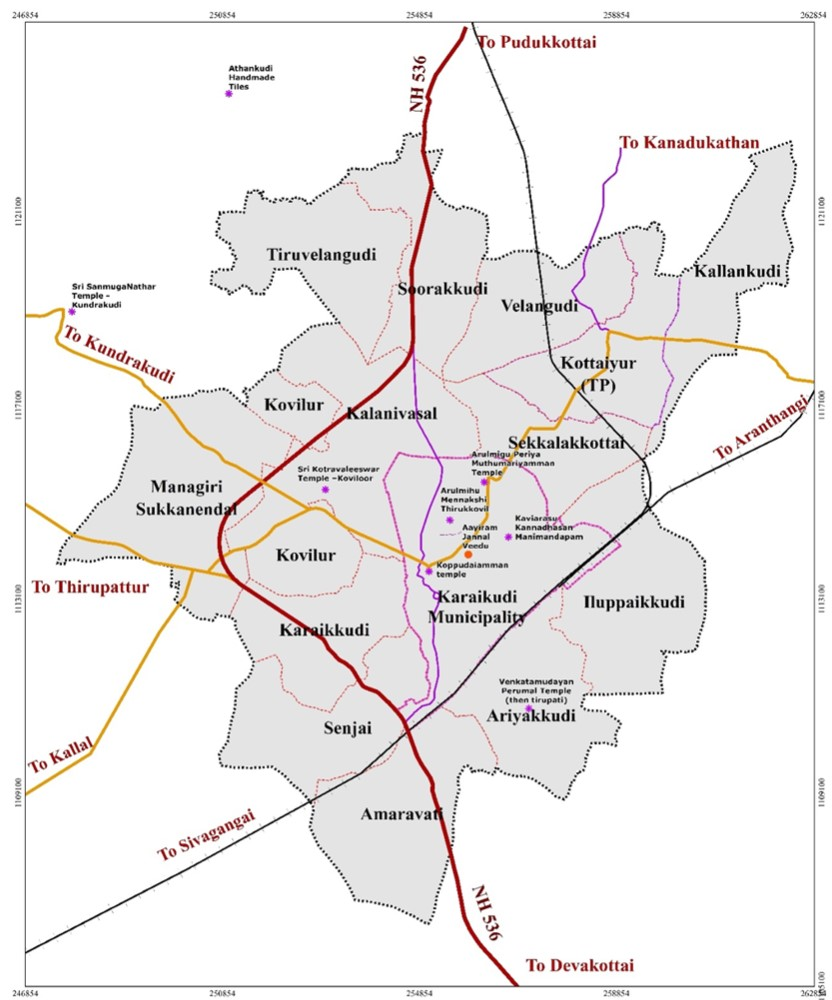
- Karaikudi Metropolitan area
- Country: India
- State: Tamil Nadu
- Planning Authority: Karaikudi Local Planning Authority (LPA)
- Seat: Karaikudi
- Districts: parts of Sivaganga district

Government
  - Type: Municipal Corporation
  - Body: Karaikudi Municipal Corporation

Area
  - Metropolitan area: 94.31 km^{2} (36.41 sq mi)

Population (2023)
  - Urban: 303,291
  - Urban density: 3,216/km^{2} (8,330/sq mi)
- Time zone: UTC+5:30 (IST)
- PIN: 630xxx
- STD Code: +91-04565
- Vehicle registration: TN-63Z
- Website: karaikudilpa.com

The Karaikudi Urban Agglomeration, or Karaikudi Metropolitan Area, is the 21st most populous urbanized area in Tamil Nadu state of India. The Karaikudi Metropolitan Area consists of the city of Karaikudi and its suburbs in Sivaganga district, together formed as Karaikudi Urban Agglomeration by government of Tamil Nadu.

== Economy ==
The economy of the metropolitan area of Karaikudi is heavily influenced by education, information technology and engineering at recent times.

== Composition ==
The Karaikudi urban agglomeration is a metropolitan area in Tamil Nadu state, consisting of the city of Karaikudi Municipal Corporation and suburban areas spread out in parts of Sivaganga district.

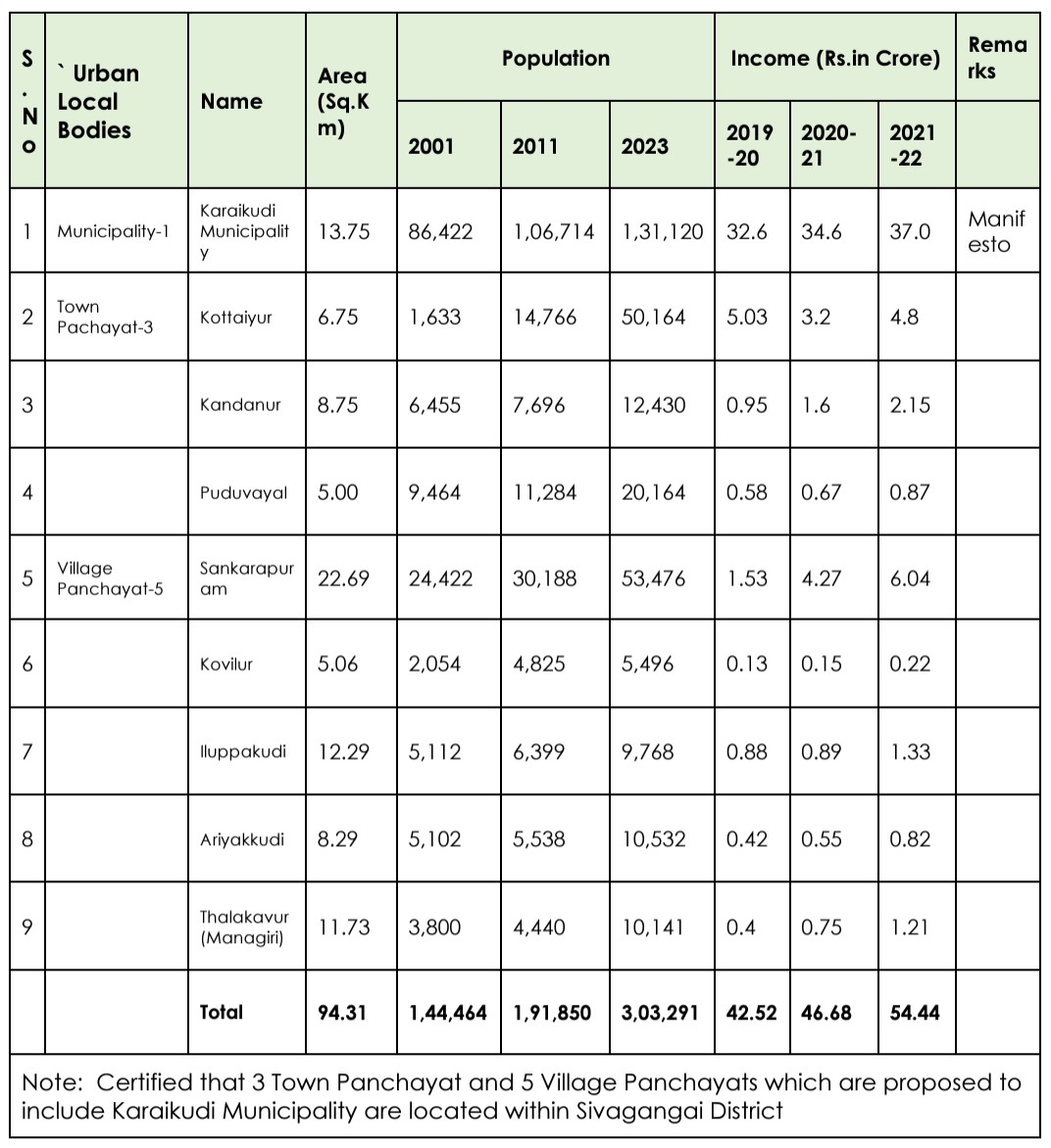
Karaikudi LPA Limits

Below is the list of surrounding towns and village panchayats which comprises the Karaikudi Metropolitan Area. Number of wards will be reformed to approximately 100 depends on the population and zones going to be allocated.

Karaikudi Metropolitan Area (2023)
| Sl. No. | Name | Governing Type | Population | Area (km^{2}.) | Wards |
|---|---|---|---|---|---|
| 1 | Karaikudi | Municipal Corporation | 131,120 | 13.75 | 36 |
| 2 | Kottaiyur | Town Panchayat | 50,164 | 6.75 | 15 |
| 3 | Kandanur | Town Panchayat | 12,430 | 8.75 | 15 |
| 4 | Puduvayal | Town Panchayat | 20,164 | 5.00 | 15 |
| 5 | Sankarapuram | Town Panchayat | 53,476 | 22.69 | 15 |
| 6 | Koviloor | Village Panchayat | 5,496 | 5.06 | 9 |
| 7 | Ariyakudi | Village Panchayat | 10,532 | 8.29 | 9 |
| 8 | Ilupakkudi | Village Panchayat | 9,768 | 12.29 | 9 |
| 9 | Managiri | Village Panchayat | 10,141 | 11.73 | 5 |
| Total | Karaikudi City | Corporation | 303,291 | 94.31 | |

=== Districts ===
1. Sivaganga district

=== Taluks ===
From Sivaganga district, parts of Karaikudi Taluk

== Transport ==
The Regional Transport offices in the Karaikudi metropolitan area are the Unit type of code TN-63Z.

Karaikudi is the headquarters of the Chettinad region, which comes under Madurai railway division of the Southern Railway zone. The city has several railway stations, of which the Karaikudi Junction is the most important and busiest in the district and nearer parts of the region. This Junction is undergoing various developments by the Indian Railways AMRUT schemes. The undergoing electrification on Tiruvarur-Karaikudi line is expedited as the line demands more trains along with the reinstated schedules.

Railway stations include:

List of railway stations in Karaikudi
| # | Station Name | | Railway Station Code | District | Present Condition | Category |
| # | English | Tamil | Railway Station Code | District | Present Condition | Category |
|---|---|---|---|---|---|---|
| 1 | Karaikudi Junction | காரைக்குடி சந்திப்பு | KKDI | Sivaganga | Functional | NSG4 |
| 2 | Kottaiyur | கோட்டையூர் | KTYR | Sivaganga | Functional | HG2 |
| 3 | Kandanur Puduvayal | கண்டனூர் புதுவயல் | KNPL | Sivaganga | Functional | HG3 |
| 4 | Devakottai Road | தேவகோட்டை சாலை (ரஸ்தா) | DKO | Sivaganga | Functional | NSG5 |
| 5 | Chettinad | செட்டிநாடு | CTND | Sivaganga | Functional | NSG6 |
| 6 | Periyakottai | பெரியகோட்டை | PYK | Sivaganga | Functional | HG2 |

=== Temporary Halt Stations ===
During the time of electricals and track maintenance at Karaikudi Junction station, the suburban stations like Chettinad and Periyakottai will be used as a temporary halt stations for the arrival/departures of trains to/from at Karaikudi Junction.

=== Freight Stations ===
Chettinad has an inland container depot (ICD), also known as a container freight station (CFS), that operates as a railway goods shed. This CFS is operated by the Karaikudi Junction railway station, It has a warehouse where goods are consolidated or deconsolidated before or after being exported or imported.

=== New Updates on the routes ===
Karaikudi Chamber of Commerce and Trade union is urging the government of India to initiate a new route to Ramanathapuram through Devakottai Road railway station.
