= Karaikkudi Junction railway station =

Railway junction in Tamil Nadu, India

Karaikkudi Junction Indian Railways station
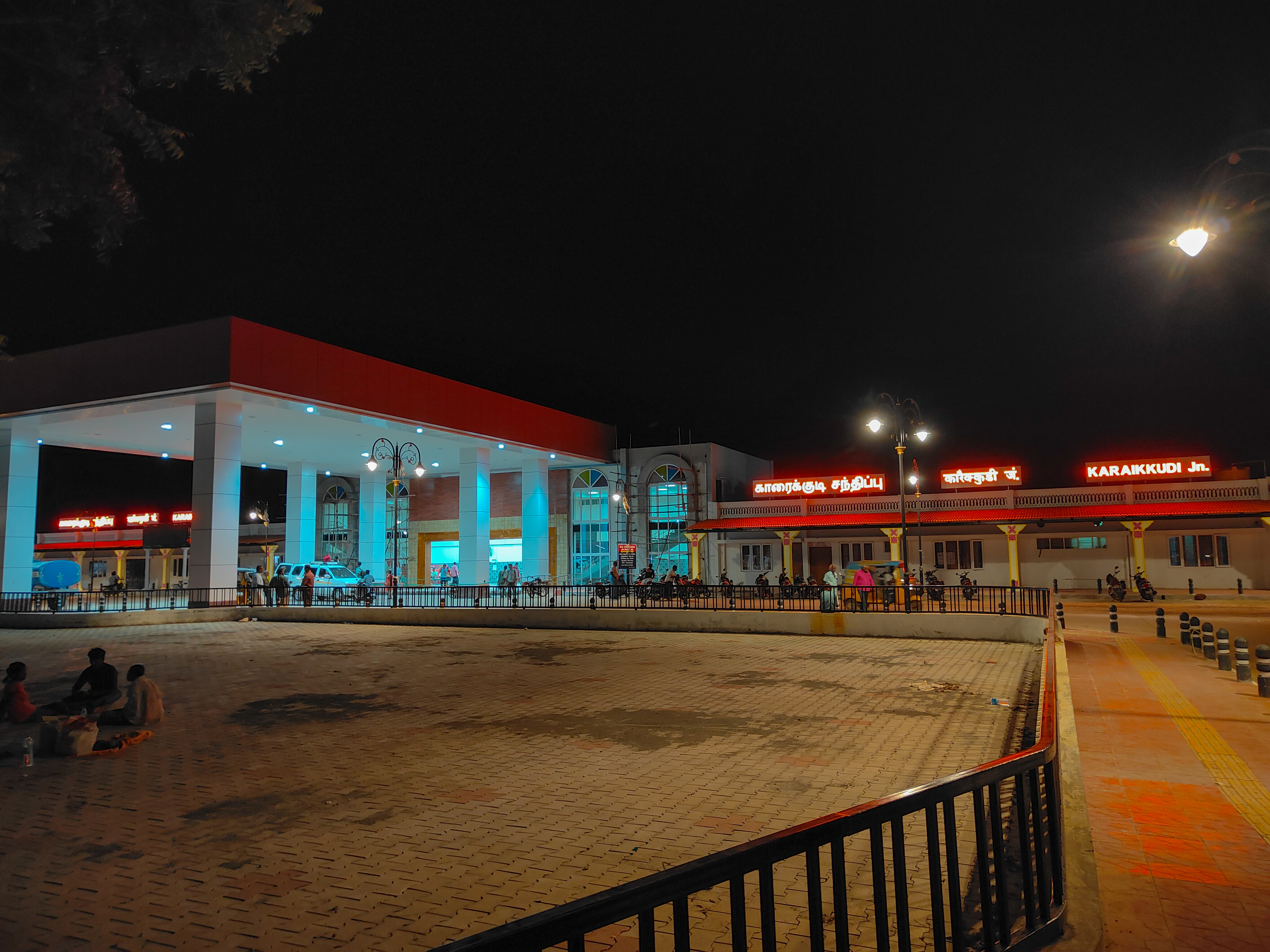
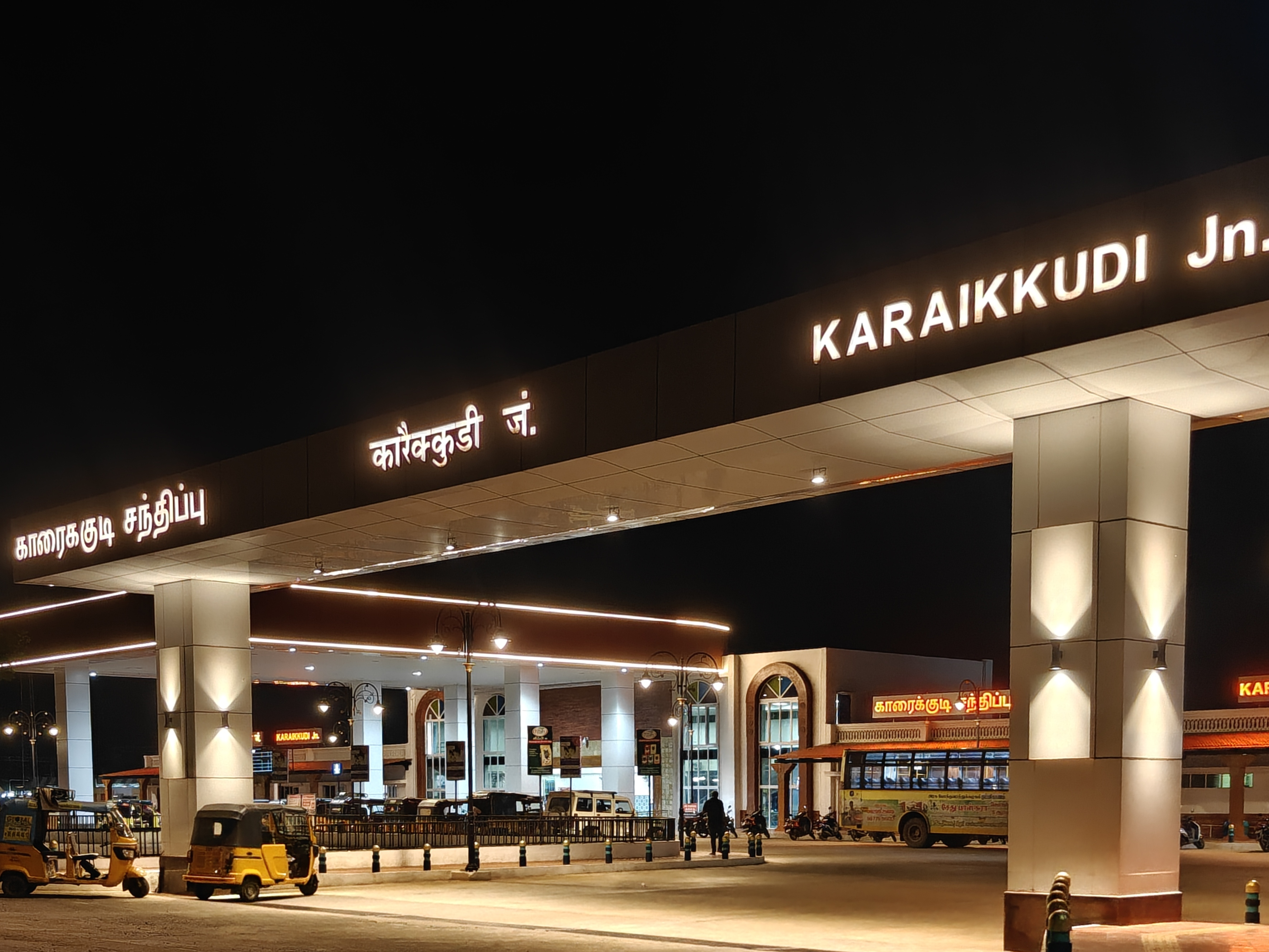
- Entrance of Karaikudi Junction Karaikudi Junction

General information
- Location: Ariyakudi Road, Karaikudi, Tamil Nadu; India
- Coordinates: 10.0678°N 78.7924°E
- Owner: Indian Railways
- Operator: Southern Railway zone
- Lines: Thiruvarur–Karaikudi, Tiruchirappalli–Karaikudi, Karaikudi-Manamadurai
- Platforms: 5
- Tracks: 8
- Connections: Taxi, Auto rickshaw, town buses are available

Construction
- Structure type: Category NSG4
- Parking: Yes
- Cycle facilities: Yes

Other information
- Status: Functioning
- Station code: KKDI
- Zone(s): Southern Railway zone
- Fare zone: Indian Railways

History
- Opened: 1 July 1930
- Rebuilt: 2008; 18 years ago

Passengers
- 2022–23: 711,396 (per year); 1,949 (per day)

Services
Preceding station	Indian Railways	Following station
Kottaiyur towards	Southern Railway zone Tiruchirappalli–Manamadurai line	Devakottai Road towards
Preceding station	Indian Railways	Following station
Kandanur Puduvayal towards	Southern Railway zone Thiruvarur–Karaikudi line	Devakottai Road towards
Route map
Location
- Location within Tamil Nadu
- Interactive map

Karaikkudi Junction (station code: KKDI) is an NSG–4 category railway station located in south-eastern part of Karaikudi Municipal Corporation in the Indian state of Tamil Nadu. It is the principal rail-head in the city that serves Karaikudi Metropolitan Area, falling under the jurisdiction of Madurai railway division of Southern Railway zone. It is the major junction of the Chettinad region and the surrounding areas of Sivaganga district. It is one of the 73 stations in Tamil Nadu to be named for upgradation under Amrit Bharat Station Scheme of Indian Railways. Along with this main junction, Karaikudi City has the following Suburban Stations around the city.

Karaikudi Junction Platform

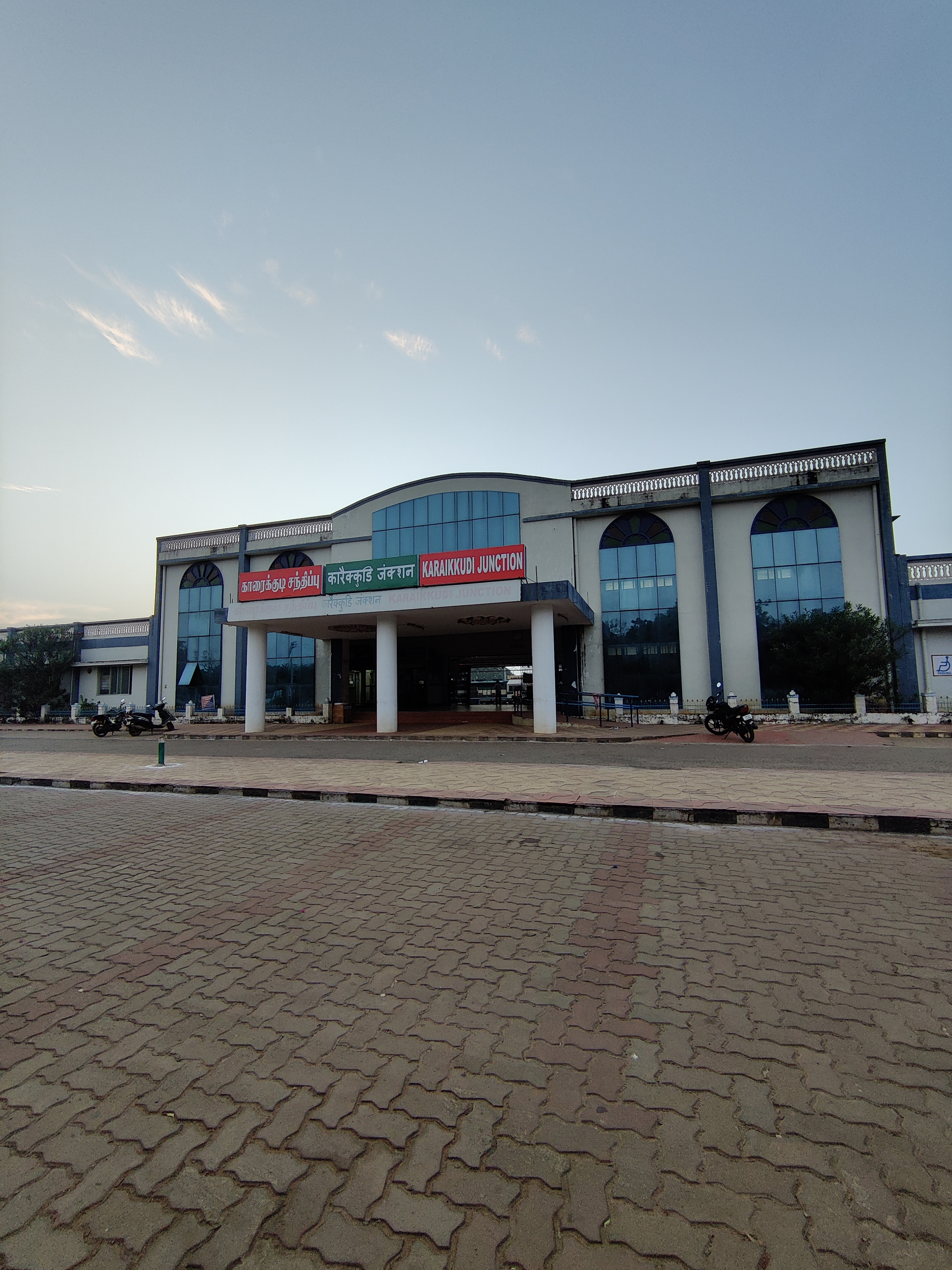
Karaikudi Junction

== History ==
Karaikudi station was constructed as a part of Pudukkottai–Sivaganga railway line during the 1930s. Initially during its older days this station acted as an ordinary railway station when the Tiruturaipundi Aranthangi line was extended to Karaikudi, it became a junction railway station. It became as a junction by connecting all the three terminal lines they are Manamadurai Sivagangai Railway line, Trichinopoly Pudukkottai Railway line and Tiruturaipundi Aranthangi Railway line. Being a junction station, three rail lines emerge from the station, one towards Tiruchirappalli Junction, another to Thiruthuraipoondi junction and the third and final one Manamadurai Junction.

== Overview ==
Being a Junction station, three rail lines emerge from the station, one towards Tiruchirappalli Junction, another to Manamadurai Junction and the third and final one towards Thiruthuraipoondi Junction.

== Administration ==
It is a major as well as an important passing station present on the Tiruchirappalli–Manamadurai railway line. It also operates an inland container depot (railway goods shed) at Chettinad railway station. It houses offices of ADEN, JE(P.way) and SSE TRD at Karaikkudi for regular train operations.

== Performance and earnings ==
For the FY 2022–23, the annual earnings of the station was ₹98,579,082 (US$1.1 million) and daily earnings was ₹270,080 (US$2,900). For the same financial year, the annual passenger count was 711,396 and daily count was 1,949. While, the footfall per day was recorded as 3,975.

== Services ==
Karaikudi is well connected with the capital city Chennai. Most of the trains bound to Chennai, Manamadurai, Rameswaram and Kanyakumari from Tiruchirappalli pass through this station, with every train having a stoppage here for a minimum of 5–10 minutes.

- BG single line towards Mayiladuthurai Junction – main line via Thiruvarur,Aranthangi, Pattukkottai, Thiruthuraipoondi Junction
- BG Electrified single line towards Tiruchirappalli Junction via Pudukkottai
- BG Electrified single line towards Manamadurai Junction via Sivaganga

== New railway lines in proposal ==
Below projects are surveyed and waiting for funds since long time.

1. Madurai–Melur–Tirupattur–Karaikudi new BG line: Reconnaissance Engineering cum Traffic Survey for a new BG line between Karaikkudi and Madurai via Melur and Thirupattur (85.70 km) was conducted and Survey Report was sent to Railway Board on 27.11.2014. This project was shelved by Railway Board.

2. Karaikudi-Natham-Dindigul new BG line: Reconnaissance Engineering cum Traffic Survey for a new BG line between Karaikkudi and Dindigul via Thirupattur and Natham (105.60 km) was conducted and Survey Report was sent to Railway Board on 06.07.2015. This project was shelved by Railway Board.

3. Karaikudi-Devakottai-Ramanathapuram-Tuticorin new BG line: Reconnaissance Engineering cum Traffic Survey for a new BG line between Karaikkudi and Tuticorin via Devakkottai and Ramanathapuram (214.81 km) was conducted and Survey Report was sent to Railway Board on 30.08.2011. This project was shelved by Railway Board.
