= Attangudi Palace =

Palace in India

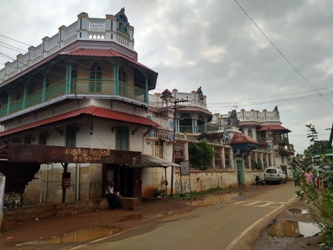
Attangudi palace

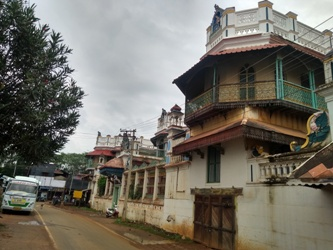
Attangudi palace, another view

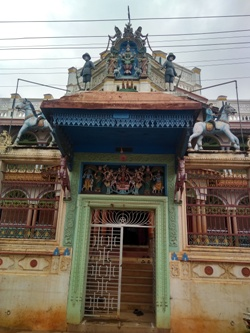
Main entrance

Attangudi Palace is a palacesituated in Attangudi in Sivaganga District, in Tamil Nadu, India.

== Location ==
Attangudi is located 24 km from Karaikkudi. The palace is situated in Chettinad region. Attangudi is famous for its palace and tiles.

== Palaces ==
In Tamil Nadu, Chettinad houses are found in many places such as Karaikkudi, Pallatthur, Attangudi and Kothamangalam. These houses are like palaces having ornamental works and woodwork throughout the building.

== Specialities ==
According to the world standard, in Chettinad, nearly 7,000 bungalows were found. Many of them were of 80–200 years old. Still they are afresh to look. The locals of Chettinad went to overseas for carrying out business foreign. In spite of that on their return in their native they built such buildings, after learning the techniques there. The materials which they used for the construction of these grand houses are mixture of lime, jaggery and the white of egg combined with Kadukkai (Myrobalan). Combination of these mixtures gave them the shining to the structure and strength. While the small bungalow were of 40' breadth and 120' length, the larger ones like palaces would be of 60' breadth and 200'. Aesthetic sense was the priority given to these structure. Without ceiling fan the inner building would be of cool. Some palaces were in 0.5 km. from the main entrance. The entrance doorjamb and the doors were made of Burma teak wood. The floors would having the marble stones imported from Dutch. Attangudi tiles add much beauty to the palace. The inner ceiling of the bungalow would have teak wood. Sculptures such as yazhi and elephant would be found with beautiful iconographical aspects. Drawings of Madurai Meenakshi Amman Temple and Rameswaram Temple were found in many palaces. In some floor, Japan flower design was also found. The pillars would be of big. In order to save the water, proper water management system was also applied. Rain water harvesting played a major role in these structures, which were introduced many years back. The materials used for the construction of these buildings have long life.

== Attangudi tiles ==
Attangudi is very known throughout the country for its hand-made terracotta tiles. They are made here, by using cement, sand, synthetic oxides and belly jelly. There are so many steps for doing this tiles. Firstly they are shaped and later sun-dried. Later artistically made patterns are given to them. They get their unique texture through the well designed patterns which are carried out by the workers and artisans. The pattern would be given with many colours for having attraction. For their houses and lawns people use it. They appeal to the building. There are also design covering the flora and fauna model. Many of the ancestral houses of this area are having these tiles. In Chettinadu many palace like houses are found with these tiles. They are made with cement, sand, synthetic oxides and so on. In Chettinadu these tiles are found in this palace and many other palaces in Arimalam, Kandanur, Karaikkudi, Kadiyapatti, Kanadukathan, Kottaiyur, Konapattu, Sirukoodalpatti, Devakottai, Pallathur, Puduvayal, Rangiyam, Rayavaram and Valayapatti.
