= Amaravathiputhur =

Amaravathipudur A.Pudur, Pudur
- Suburban
- Nickname: Amaravathiputhur
- Location in South Karaikudi, Tamil Nadu, India
- Coordinates: 10.021881°N 78.767536°E
- Country: India
- State: Tamil Nadu
- District: Sivaganga

Government
  - Body: Karaikudi City Municipal Corporation
- Elevation: 77 m (253 ft)

Population (2011)
  - Total: 9,221

Languages
  - Official: Tamil
- Time zone: UTC+5:30 (IST)
- PIN: 630301
- Telephone code: 04565
- Vehicle registration: TN63Z

Amaravathipudur is situated in the southern part of Karaikudi Municipal Corporation in the Sivaganga District which is 7 km from the center of the Karaikudi City. This village panchayat has a total of 7 panchayat constituencies. 7 Panchayat Council members are elected from these. According to the 2011 India census, the total population in Amaravathipudur is 9,221. Among them 4,475 females and 4,746 males. It has 9 wards in total.

The Central Industrial Security Force (CISF) Battalion Camp has been set up here by Former Union Finance Minister P.Chidambaram

== Sankarapathi Fort ==
Sankarapathi Fort is located in the northern entrance of this village on the western side of National Highway NH536. which is more than 200 years old.
