= Sirumalaikottai =

Sirumalaikottai is a village panchayat in Tamil Nadu, India. It is located in Ramanathapuram district, Thiruvadanai Taluk. The nearest towns are Devakottai, Karaikudi, and Thiruvadanai.

The population of the village is 2500. The majority language is Tamil.

There are eight temples and 3 churches here.

== Education ==
1. Government Primary School Keelakottai.
2. St. Francis Xavier Elementary school Piranthanvayal
