= Koviloor, Karaikudi =

Koviloor Kovilur
- Suburban
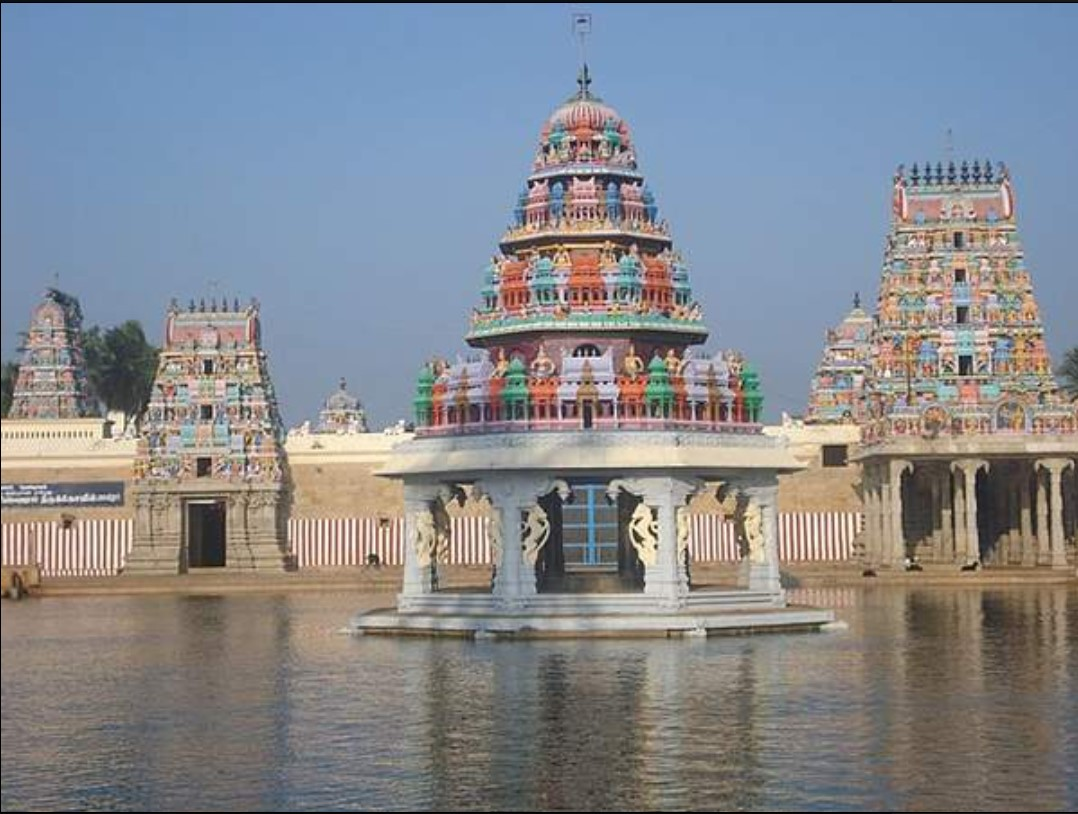
- Koviloor
- Interactive map of Koviloor
- Coordinates: 10.15°N 78.27°E
- Country: India
- State: Tamil Nadu
- District: Sivaganga
- Taluk: Karaikudi

Government
  - Type: Village Panchayat
  - Body: Karaikudi City Municipal Corporation

Population (2011)
  - Total: 4,287

Languages
  - Official: Tamil
- Time zone: UTC+5:30 (IST)
- Postal code: 630307
- Vehicle registration: TN63Z

Koviloor is a suburban village to the Port of Karaikudi of Sivaganga District of the Indian state of Tamil Nadu. It contains Arulmigu Kotravaaleeswara Temple, which is more than 1500 years old. It has one of the country's oldest mutts, Koviloor Adheenam.

== Demographics ==
According to the 2011 census, the total population of Koviloor is 4,287 with an average sex ratio of 977 (2,168 males and 2,119 females).

== Transport ==
Koviloor is connected by roads to nearby towns and cities. It is located on the main road connecting Madurai with Karaikudi. Buses travel to Tirupattur and Karaikudi. Rural buses are available from Karaikudi, Tiruppattur, and Devakottai with connections to Madurai.

== Temples ==
- Arulmigu Kotravaaleeswarar temple, built by King Veerasekara Pandiyan, is more than 1500 years old. It is built based on Dravidian architecture with seven towers.
- Koviloor Adheenam is one of Tamil Nadu's oldest mutts, approximately 200 years old.

== Economy ==
Koviloor has TNSTC Karaikudi regional headquarters. Tamil Nadu Chemicals Pvt. Ltd. manufactures chemicals like sodium hydrosulfite and its byproducts. The SETC Karaikudi Depot is there.

== Education ==
Koviloor has colleges and schools:

=== Colleges ===
- Nachiyappa Swamigal Arts and Science College, Koviloor, Karaikudi
- Nachiyappa Swamigal Polytechnic College, Koviloor, Karaikudi

=== Schools ===
- Koviloor Andavar Matriculation Higher Secondary School, Koviloor, Karaikudi
