= Periyakottai railway station =

Railway station in Tamil Nadu, India

General information
- Location: Karaikudi-Aranthangi Road, Periyakottai, Tamil Nadu; India
- Coordinates: 8.4512°N 78.8122°E
- Elevation: 135 metres (443 ft)
- System: Indian Railways station
- Owner: Indian Railways
- Operator: Madurai railway division
- Line: Mayiladuthurai–Karaikudi line
- Platforms: 1
- Tracks: 3
- Connections: Auto stand

Construction
- Structure type: Standard (on ground station)
- Parking: Yes
- Cycle facilities: Yes

Other information
- Status: Functioning
- Station code: PYK
- Fare zone: Southern Railway

History
- Former names: Madras and Southern Mahratta Railway
Location

Periyakottai railway station (station code:PYK) is an HG-2 category Indian railway station in Madurai railway division of Southern Railway zone. It serves Periyakottai and surrounding areas, located in north eastern suburb of Karaikudi Municipal Corporation in Sivaganga district of the Indian state of Tamil Nadu.

== List of trains stopping at Periyakottai Railway Station ==
1. Karaikudi-Tiruvarur Passenger

2. Tiruvarur-Karaikudi Passenger
