= CECRI =

CECRI may refer to

- Centre d'Etudes des Crises et Conflits Internationaux, a research center at the University of Louvain (UCLouvain)
- Central Electro Chemical Research Institute, a CSIR laboratory in Tamil Nadu, India
