= Kalathur T =

Kalathur.T
- Village
- Location in Tamil Nadu
- Coordinates: 10.006345°N 78.892168°E
- Country: India
- State: Tamil Nadu
- District: Sivaganga
- Talukas: Devakottai Taluk
- Time zone: UTC+5.30 (IST)
- Postal code: 630801
- Telephone code: 91-4561
- Nearest city: Karaikudi

Kalathur.T is a Panchayat village in Karaikudi Assembly, Kannankudi union and Devakottai Taluk of Sivaganga district in the Indian state of Tamil Nadu.
