= Chettinad railway station =

Railway station in Tamil Nadu, India

General information
- Location: Karaikudi Road, Chettinad, Karaikudi, Tamil Nadu; India
- Coordinates: 10°9′38.20″N 78°46′33.31″E
- Elevation: 135 metres (443 ft)
- System: Indian Railways station
- Owner: Indian Railways
- Operator: Madurai railway division
- Line: Tiruchirappalli–Karaikudi line
- Platforms: 3
- Tracks: 4
- Connections: Auto stand

Construction
- Structure type: Standard (on ground station)
- Parking: Yes
- Cycle facilities: Yes

Other information
- Status: Functioning
- Station code: CTND
- Fare zone: Southern Railway

History
- Opened: 1930
- Rebuilt: 2008
- Former names: Madras and Southern Mahratta Railway
Location

Chettinad railway station (station code:CTND) is an NGS 6 category Indian railway station in Madurai railway division of Southern Railway zone. It serves Chettinad and Kanadukathan, located in northern suburb of Karaikudi Municipal Corporation in Sivaganga district of the Indian state of Tamil Nadu.

== List of trains stopping at Chettinad Railway Station ==
1. Karaikudi-Tiruchirappalli Passenger

2. Karaikudi-Tiruchirappalli DEMU

3. Tiruchirappalli-Karaikudi Passenger

4. Tiruchirappalli-Karaikudi DEMU

5. Karaikudi to Tiruchirappalli Passenger

6 Tiruchirappalli Karaikudi passenger
