= List of educational institutions in Karaikudi =

Colleges and schools in Tamil Nadu, India

Karaikudi, India, often referred to as "Educational City", has many educational institutions starting few decades old to a few newly constructed ones from both government and some private sectors. Most popular 15 colleges are listed in 2023 rankings. Recently Alagappa University in Karaikudi is listed in one of the top 500 universities in the world as per Times Higher Education listings.

== Universities ==
- Alagappa University Karaikudi Campus.

== Engineering Colleges ==
- Alagappa Chettiar College of Engineering and Technology Karaikudi.
- Karaikudi Institute of Technology, KIT & KIM Campus, Managiri, Karaikudi.
- Sri Rajarajan College of Engineering and Technology, Amaravathipudur, Karaikudi.

== Research Institutions ==
- CECRI - Central Electrochemical Research Institute, Karaikudi.
- AC & RI CHETTINAD - Agricultural College And Research Institute, Chettinad, Tamil Nadu Agricultural University, Karaikudi
- DARS - Dryland Agriculture Research Station, Chettinad, Karaikudi

== Arts and Science Colleges ==
- Alagappa Arts and Science college, Karaikudi.
- Dr Umayal Ramanathan Women's college for Arts & Science, Karaikudi.
- Nachiyappa Swamigal Arts and Science College, Koviloor, Karaikudi
- Sri Sarada Niketan College for Women, Amaravathipudur, Karaikudi.
- Vidhyaa Giri College of Arts and Science, Puduvayal, Karaikudi.

== Business Schools and Colleges ==
- Alagappa Institute of Management, Karaikudi.
- Karaikudi Institute of Management, KIT & KIM Campus, Managiri, Karaikudi.

== Law colleges ==
- Government Law College, Karaikudi

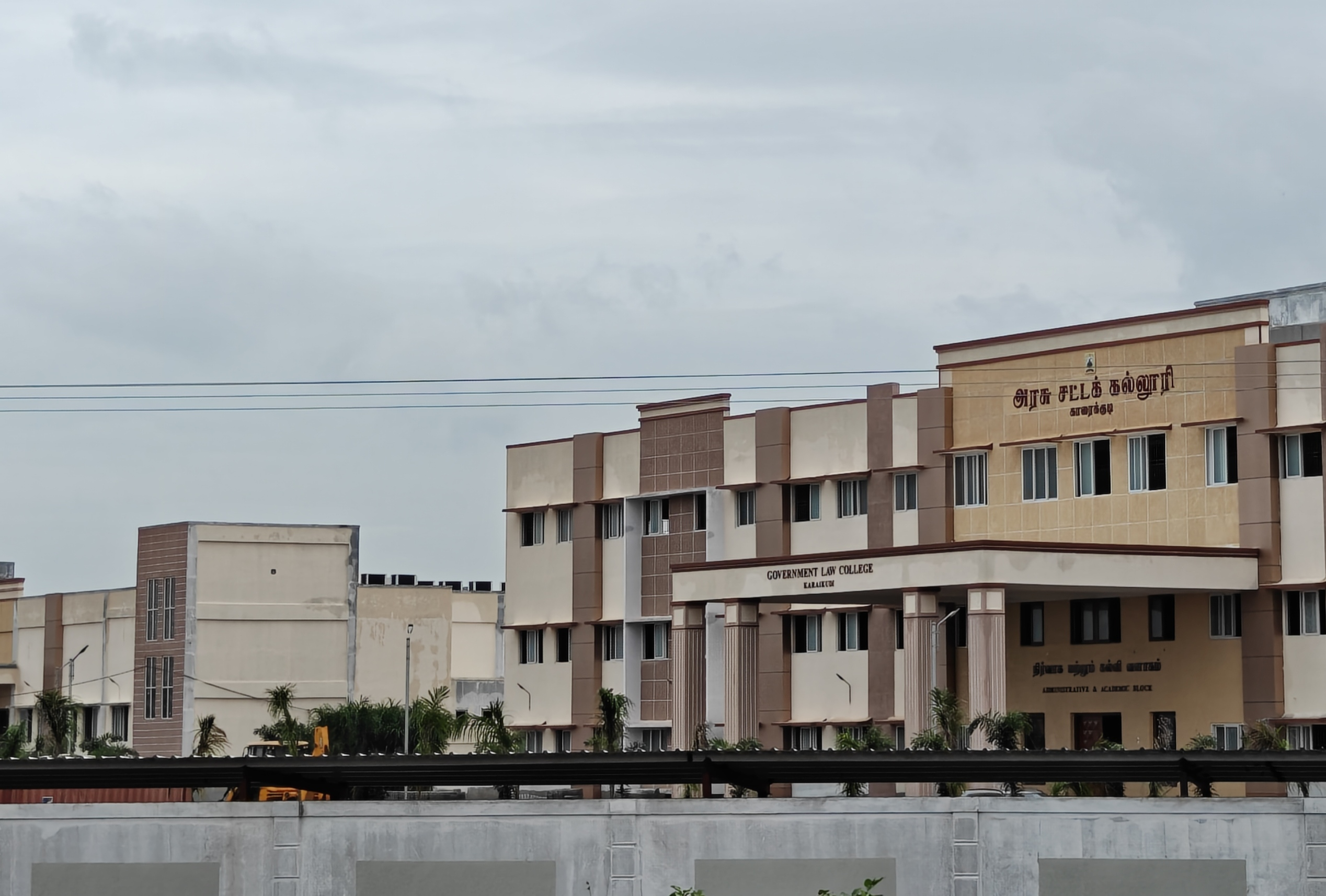
Law College Karaikudi

== Agricultural colleges ==
- Agricultural college and Research Institute Chettinad, Karaikudi.
- Krishi Vigyan Kendra, Kundrakudi, Karaikudi
- Sethu Bhaskara Agricultural College and Research Foundation, Karaikudi.

== Polytechnic colleges ==
- Alagappa Polytechnic, Karaikudi
- Annamalai Polytechnic, Chettinad
- Nachiyappa Swamigal Polytechnic College, Koviloor, Karaikudi

== Schools and institutions ==
- Alagappa Academy C.B.S.E School, Karaikudi.
- Alagappa Matriculation & Higher Secondary School, Karaikudi.
- Alagappa Model Higher Secondary School, Karaikudi.
- Azad Matriculation Higher Secondary School, Karaikudi.
- Chellappan Vidya Mandir C.B.S.E School, Karaikudi.
- Chettinadu Publikaraikudi.

C.B.S.E, Managiri, Karaikudi.

- Chidambaram Chettiar Girls Higher Secondary School, Kottaiyur, Karaikudi.
- Chittal Achi Memorial High School, Kandanur, Karaikudi.
- Government Higher Secondary School, Ariyakudi, Karaikudi.
- Government Girls Higher Secondary School, Muthupattinam, Karaikudi.
- Government Higher Secondary School, Soorakkudi, Karaikudi.
- Government Higher School, O.Siruvayal, Karaikudi.
- The leaders academy CBSE and Matriculation Hr Sec School, karaikudi
- Sri Vairavar matriculation High school, Karaikudi
- Muthupattinam Corporation primary school, karaikudi
- Saraswathi govt aided primary school
- Intel Vidyalaya Matriculation & Higher Secondary School, Ariyakudi, Karaikudi.
- Kamban Karpagam Matriculation & Higher Secondary School, Karaikudi.
- Kendriya Vidyalaya Karaikudi, C.E.C.R.I Campus, Karaikudi.
- Koviloor Andavar Matriculation & Higher Secondary School, Koviloor, Karaikudi.
- LFRC Higher Secondary school, Senjai, Karaikudi.
- Maharishi Vidya Mandir C.B.S.E School, Karaikudi.
- Maruthamalayaan Matriculation Higher Secondary School, Anandanagar, Karaikudi.
- Muthiah Alagappa Matriculation & Higher Secondary School, Kottaiyur, Karaikudi.
- M.V Government Higher Secondary School, Muthupattinam, Karaikudi.
- Ramanathan chettiar Corporation High School, Karaikudi. (Formerly, Ramanathan chettiar Municipal High School, Karaikudi.)
- Ramanathan Chettiar Higher Secondary School, Puduvayal, Karaikudi.
- Sahayamatha Matriculation & Higher Secondary School, Karaikudi.
- S.M.S.V Government Higher Secondary School, Muthupattinam, Karaikudi.
- St. Michael Matriculation Higher Secondary School, Ariyakudi, Karaikudi.
- Sri Kalaivani Vidyalaya Matriculation Higher Secondary School, Senjai, Karaikudi.
- Sri Raghavendra Matriculation Higher Secondary School, Gandhipuram, Karaikudi.
- Subbaiya Ambalam Matriculation Higher Secondary School, Kottaiyur, Karaikudi.
- Thanjavur Arunachalam Chettiyar Government Higher Secondary School, Kottaiyur, Karaikudi.
- Vidhyagiri Matriculation Higher Secondary School, Muthupattinam, Karaikudi.
- Chinnaiah Ambalam School, Karaikudi
- Joseph nursery and primary school, karaikudi.
- Kalanivasal corporation middle school, karaikudi.
- Ponmalar primary school, Karaikudi
- Venus primary school, karaikudi
- VTC primary school, Karaikudi
