= Paramanatham =

Village in Tamil Nadu, India

Paramanatham is a village in Sankarapuram Taluk, Kallakurichi district, Tamil Nadu. As of 2001 census, the village had a population of 2284 people spread over 494 households. The nearest major town is Ulundurpettai.
