= Devakottai Road railway station =

Railway station in Tamil Nadu

General information
- Location: NH210, Devakottai Road, Rastha, Karaikudi, Tamil Nadu; India
- Coordinates: 10.0391°N 78.7643°E
- Elevation: 135 metres (443 ft)
- System: Indian Railways station
- Owner: Indian Railways
- Operator: Madurai railway division
- Line: Karaikudi–Manamadurai line
- Platforms: 1
- Tracks: 3
- Connections: Auto stand

Construction
- Structure type: Standard (on ground station)
- Parking: Yes
- Cycle facilities: Yes

Other information
- Status: Functioning
- Station code: DKO
- Fare zone: Southern Railway

History
- Former names: Madras and Southern Mahratta Railway
Location

Devakottai Road railway station (station code:DKO) is an NSG6 category Indian railway station in Madurai railway division of Southern Railway zone. It is located in southern suburb of Karaikudi Municipal Corporation, serves Devakottai and southern suburban parts of Karaikudi in Sivaganga district of the Indian state of Tamil Nadu.

Since this station comes under the Karaikudi LPA area, Karaikudi Chamber of commerce is requesting the board to improvise the developments of Devakottai Station and to continue the survey for new track works towards Ramanathapuram.

== List of Trains stopping in Devakottai Road Railway Station ==
1. Coimbatore - Rameswaram Express

2. Silambu SF Express (PT)

3. Chennai Egmore - Rameswaram Express (PT)

4. Tiruchchirappalli - Rameswaram Express (UnReserved)

5. Virudunagar - Karaikkudi DEMU

6. Rameswaram - Bhubaneswar Weekly SF Express (PT)

7. Rameswaram - Tiruchchirappalli Express (UnReserved)

8. Karaikkudi - Virudunagar DEMU

9. Bhubaneswar - Rameswaram Weekly SF Express (PT)

10. Rameswaram - Chennai Egmore Express (PT)

11. Silambu SF Express (PT)

12. Rameswaram - Coimbatore Express

13. Sethu SF Express (PT)
