= Ariyakudi Ramanuja Iyengar =

Indian singer (1890–1967)

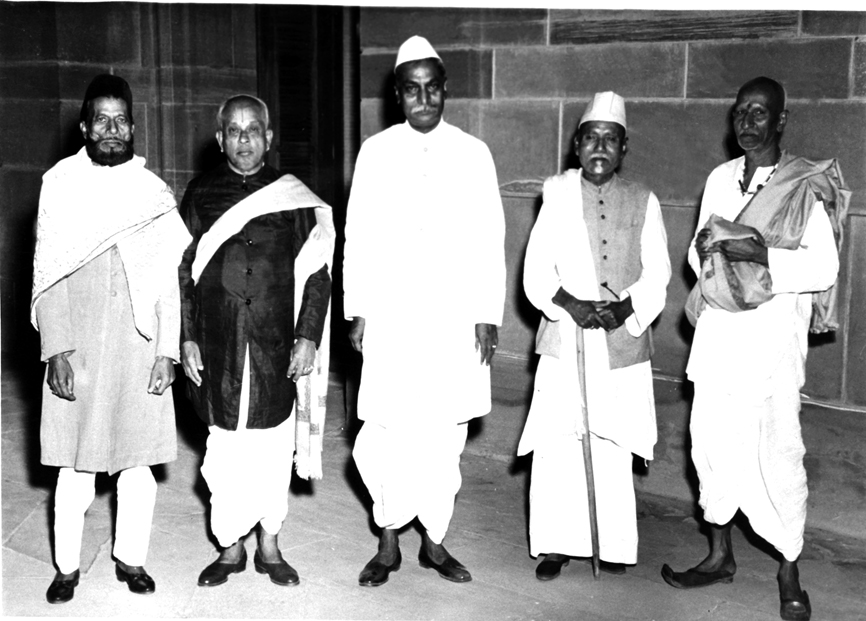
Ustad Mushtaq Hussain, Ariyakudi Ramanuja Iyengar, Ustad Allauddin Khan and Karaikudi Sambasiva Iyer received The Musician award from President Rajendra Prasad (center) in 1952.

Ariyakudi Ramanuja Iyengar (19 May 1890 – 23 January 1967), popularly known as Ariyakudi, was a Carnatic music vocalist, born in Ariyakudi, a town in the present-day Sivaganga district of Tamil Nadu. Ariyakudi developed a unique style of singing which came to be known as The Ariyakudi Tradition and is followed by his students. He is credited with establishing the modern katcheri (concert) traditions in Carnatic music.

In 1952, he was among the first batch of recipients of the Sangeet Natak Akademi Award. In 1954, he was awarded the Sangeet Natak Akademi Fellowship, the highest honour conferred by Sangeet Natak Akademi, India's National Academy for Music, Dance and Drama. This was followed by Padma Bhushan by Government of India in 1958.

== Early life and background ==
Ariyakudi was born in Ariyakudi, a village in the southern Karaikudi town in present-day Sivaganga district of Tamil Nadu, South India, on 19 May 1890. He studied under Pudukottai Malayappa Iyer and Namakkal Narasimha Iyengar in his early years. Later he studied for several years under Poochi Srinivasa Iyengar, the senior most disciple of Patnam Subramania Iyer.

He married Ponnammal (in 1909) and the couple had two daughters. Later he set up another house with Kanjanur Sundarambal Dhanammal, who was a devadasi and became his student after which there was some kind of an association.

== Career and legacy ==
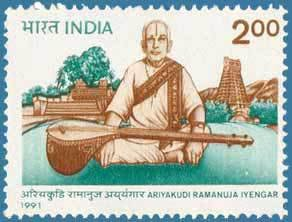
Ariyakudi Ramanuja Iyengar Stamp of India - 1991

He made his debut at Tyagaraja Aradhana in 1918.

The doyen of Carnatic music, Semmangudi Srinivasa Iyer, is known to have remarked, "I was greatly influenced by Ariyakudi Ramanuja Iyengar. I do not want another life. But if there is one, I want to be able to sing like Ramanuja Iyengar". And another maestro, G N Balasubramaniam, a contemporary of Ariyakudi, is known to have prostrated in front of him out of respect. Ariyakudi formed a formidable partnership on the concert platform with mridangam maestro Palghat Mani Iyer and the two had a strong friendship born out of mutual respect. Palghat Mani Iyer is reported to have said, "Annaa (Chembai Vaidyanatha Bhagavatar) and Iyengarval (Ariyakudi) are like my two eyes".

== Disciples ==
Ariyakudi's famous disciples include [V V Sadagopan]K V Narayanaswamy, B. Rajam Iyer, Alepey Venkatesan, Madurai N. Krishnan, and Ambi Bhagavathar. He also had regular interactions with M.S. Subbulakshmi and shaped her musical interests.

== Awards ==
- Sangeetha Kalanidhi award (1938)
- Sangeet Natak Akademi Award (1952)
- Sangeet Natak Akademi Fellowship (1954)
- Isai Perarignar (1950) by Tamil Isai Sangam, Chennai
- Gayaka Shikhamani by Mysore darbar
- Sangita Ratnakara by Vellore Sangeetha Sabha
- Sangita Kala Shikhamani by Indian Fine Arts Society, Chennai
- Padma Bhushan award by Government of India in 1958

== Bibliography ==
- Ariyakudi Ramanuja Iyenkar Day. Ariyakudi Ramanuja Iyengar Trust. 1984.
