= Devapandalam =

Village in Sankarapuram, Tamil Nadu, India

Devapandalam is a Panchayat village (PIN Code: 606402) in Sankarapuram taluk in Kallakurichi district in the Indian state of Tamil Nadu. Located on Kallakurichi - Tiruvannamalai State High Way. Tirukovilur is just 15 km away.
