= Viriyur =

Village in Tamil Nadu, India

Coordinates: 11°52′40″N 78°57′50″E

Viriyur is a village Sankarapuram taluk, Kallakurichi district, Tamil Nadu, India, with a 2001 population of 5,019. It is the site of Our Lady of Refuge church (Catholic), this Church was built with Gothic Baroque mingled architectural style and it aged above a century. There is a place to teach discipline is none other than Punitha Adaikala Annai Higher secondary School.There is Famous Women's arts and science college known as Immaculate arts and science college which is administrated by FIHM(Franciscan sisters of the Immaculate Heart of Mary) sisters. .
