= Shanmuganatha Pattanam =

- Village
- Country: India
- State: Tamil Nadu
- District: Sivaganga

Languages
  - Official: Tamil
- Time zone: UTC+5:30 (IST)
- PIN: 630411
- Telephone code: 04561
- Nearest city: Devakottai, Karaikudi, Kalaiyar Kovil, Sivaganga
- Sex ratio: 60:40 ♂/♀
- Literacy: 90%
- Lok Sabha constituency: Sivaganga
- Vidhan Sabha constituency: Thiruvadanai now added to Karaikudi

Shanmuganatha Pattanam is a small Nagarathar Village which is located near Devakottai.This village has its own history tends to be 175 years old or more. Though Shanmuganatha Pattanam is an interior village of Sivaganga district, it has got all major facilities such as schools up to higher secondary, post office, transport in frequent mode (auto and bus), and water facility.

== Schools ==
- Nalla Karuppan Chettiar Elementary School
- V.N.T. Govt. Hr. Sec. School
- Ramasamy Elementary School

== Government offices ==
- Post office
- Telephone exchange (Kumaravelur)

== Temples ==
- Sri Siddhi Vinayagar Temple
- Sri Karumariyamman Temple
- Sri Muniswarar Temple
- Sri Thamburudaiya Ayyanar Temple
- Sri Naganathar Temple
- Sri Madurai Veeran Temple
