= Kottaiyur railway station =

Railway station in Tamil Nadu, India

General information
- Location: Karaikudi Bypass Road, Kottaiyur, Karaikudi, Tamil Nadu; India
- Coordinates: 8.4285°N 78.7882°E
- Elevation: 135 metres (443 ft)
- System: Indian Railways station
- Owner: Indian Railways
- Operator: Madurai railway division
- Line: Tiruchirappalli–Karaikudi line
- Platforms: 1
- Tracks: 1
- Connections: bus stop

Construction
- Structure type: Standard (on ground station)
- Parking: Yes
- Cycle facilities: Yes

Other information
- Status: Functioning
- Station code: KTYR
- Fare zone: Southern Railway

History
- Rebuilt: 2008
- Former names: Madras and Southern Mahratta Railway
Location

Kottaiyur railway station (station code:KTYR) is an HG-2 category Indian railway station in Madurai railway division of Southern Railway zone. It serves Kottaiyur, located in northern suburb of Karaikudi Municipal Corporation in Sivaganga district of the Indian state of Tamil Nadu.

== List of Trains stopping in Kottaiyur Railway Station ==
- Karaikudi-Tiruchirappalli Passenger
- Tiruchirappalli-Rameswaram Express
- Karaikudi-Tiruchirappalli DEMU
- Tiruchirappalli-Karaikudi Passenger
- Rameswaram-Tiruchirappalli Express
- Tiruchirappalli-Karaikudi DEMU
