= Friends Volleyball Club =

Friends Volleyball Club is a volleyball club based in Puduvayal, Tamil Nadu, India. It was founded in 1986 by Jayakumar Krishnan. He studied in Ramanathan Chettiar Higher Secondary School in Puduvayal. This club is promoting volleyball and athletics in this region. This club conducts state level volleyball tournaments every year. Some of the best players in the country participated in these tournaments and represented this prestigious club.

== List of international players who represented the club ==
1. Solaimalai R (Senior India)
2. Natarajan J (Senior India)
3. Sivabalan (Senior India)
4. Kumaran (Senior India)
5. Sundaram (Senior India)
6. Ramamoorthy (Beach Volleyball)
7. Nickson (Beach Volleyball)
8. Sayee Krishnan (Senior India)
9. Manoharan (Senior India)

== List of players who represented the club and Tamil Nadu state ==
1. Ilamaran (Represented Indian Railways for World Railways Games)
2. Uma Rajan
3. Prakash (Representing Indian Army team currently and played for Tamil Nadu youth Team)
4. Merline (Represented Tamil Nadu for [Rurals, SGFI, Women's] nationals for three times)
