= Sivabalan =

Indian volleyball player

Sivabalan is a volleyball player from Tamil Nadu, India. He has played for both junior and senior national volleyball teams. In his later years, he also played beach volleyball for India.

== Early life ==
Sivabalan was born in Melur, Madurai district. He studied at the St. Mary's Higher Secondary School, Madurai where he had his early training in volleyball in 1997–1998. He was part of the Friends Volleyball Club, Puduvayal and later he honed his skills at the Sports Hostel from 1998.

== Career ==
He is currently the captain of Chennai Customs basketball team, Chennai. He earlier played for Indian Overseas Bank, Chennai. He hails from Sivaganga district, Tamil Nadu. He is the product of SDAT. He was a student of Loyola College, Chennai.
