= Madras Railway =

Former railway company of India

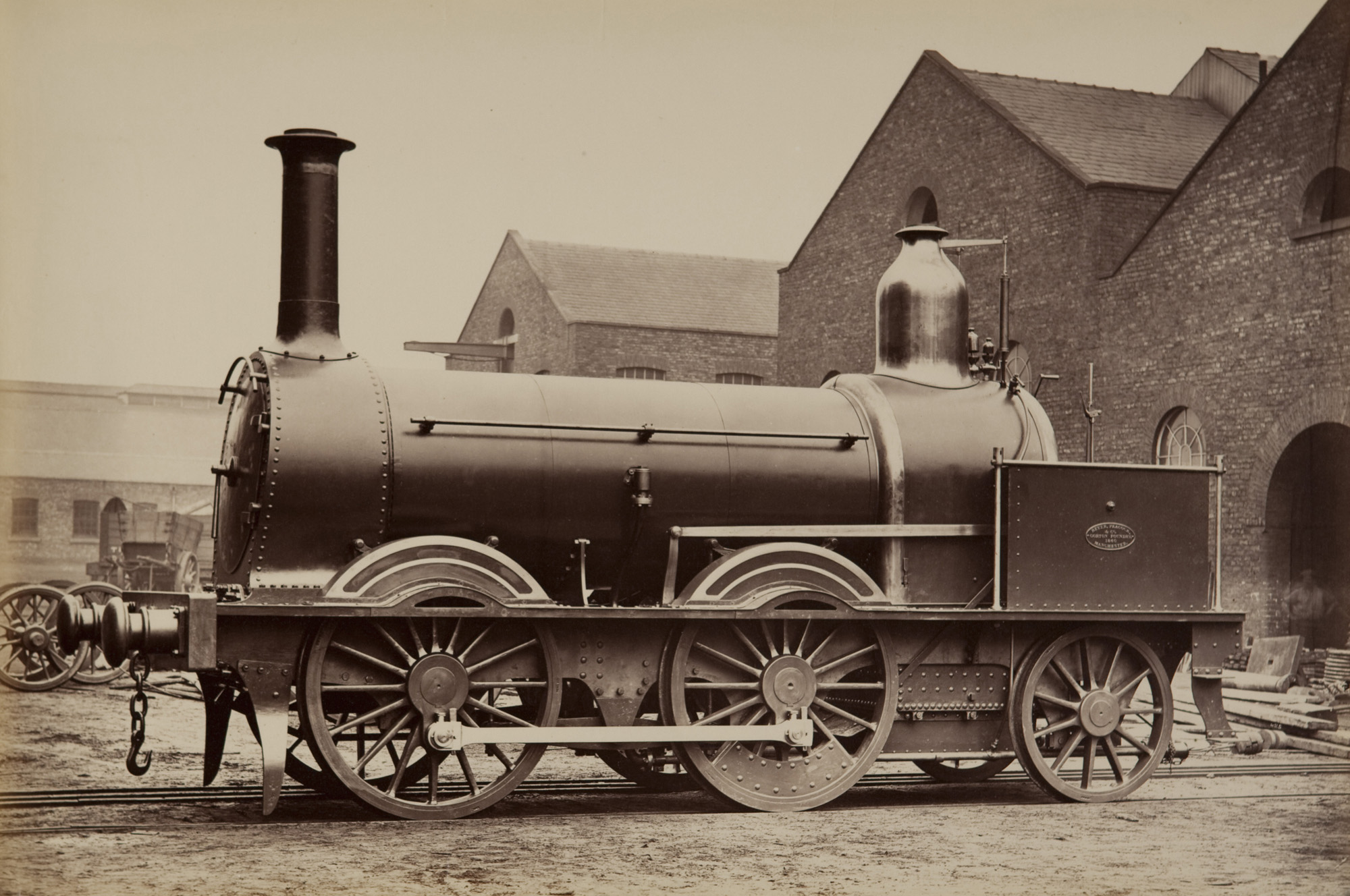
- Industry: Railways
- Founded: 8 May 1845
- Defunct: Merged with Southern Mahratta Railway to form Madras and Southern Mahratta Railway in 1908
- Headquarters: Madras (now Chennai), India
- Area served: Southern India
- Services: Rail transport

Madras Railway (Madras Railway Company) was one of the railway companies operating rail services in British India.

In 1832, the proposal to construct the first railway line in India at Madras was made by the British. In 1835, the railway track was constructed between Little Mount and Chintadripet in Madras and became operational in 1837. Madras Railway was established later in 1845 and the construction on the first main line between Madras and Arcot started in 1853, which became operational in 1856. Its objective was to connect Madras on the east coast with the west coast and to link up with the line from Bombay

In 1862, a link with the west coast was established with a line to Beypore, which served as the western terminus of the Madras Railway. The western terminus was shifted to Kozhikode in 1888. The link between Jolarpettai, a station on the Chennai-Beypore and Bangalore Cantonment was established in 1864. In 1871, the Madras Railway was extended up to Raichur and was linked with an extension of the Great Indian Peninsula Railway from Kalyan thereby connecting Madras and Bombay. Vijayawada link was established in 1899, thereby opening the Howrah-Chennai main line connecting Madras with Calcutta.

Railways in British India
"As a child of its era, the railway left an indelible mark on the 19th century developments in India. In a country of continental distances, it provided the foundation for modern economic expansion by facilitating the carriage of huge quantities of passengers and freight over very long distances at hitherto unparalleled speeds. During the early part of 20th century, in a growing economy with rapid increase in demand for mobility, railway development was sparked off at a pace similar if not more marked than in Western countries in the 19th century. Development and rapid expansion of railway network in British India served as the backbone for economic growth and industrial development in the post independence era."

By the end of 1877 the company owned 150 steam locomotives, 391 coaches and 3223 goods wagons. The southern part of the East Coast State Railway was taken over by Madras Railway in 1901. The Kolar Gold Fields railway, Nilgiri Mountain Railway and Shoranur-Cochin railway were part of Madras Railway.

In 1908, Madras Railway merged with Southern Mahratta Railway to form the Madras and Southern Mahratta Railway.
