= Devakottai Ramanathan =

Indian comedian

Radhakrishnan Ramanathan is a Tamil actor and stand-up comedian based in the town of Devakottai in Tamil Nadu, India. Having participated and won in a number of oratorical competitions during the school days, Ramanathan became known to the Tamil TV viewers through Vijay TV's hit TV show "Kalakka Povathu Yaru", a show promoting stand-up comedy in the Tamil Language. Subsequently, Ramanathan appeared in a number of other shows like Sun TV's "Asatha Povathu Yaaru", Raj TV's "Agada Vigadam", "Sirippom Sindhippom", and Vijay TV's "Tamil Paechu Engal Moochu". Ramanathan holds a degree in Law from the Madurai Law College. Ramanathan has been invited by organizations in India and in countries like Singapore, UAE and Kuwait and Bahrain to perform in front of their Tamil speaking audience with his powerful and entertaining oratory skills.

== Career ==
Ramanathan first appeared in Sun TV's "Arattai Arangam", a talk show hosted by veteran Tamil actor Visu, in the year 2005. He impressed the audience with his oratory skills. He was widely noticed and recognized in 2006 when he performed as one of the stand-up comedians in Vijay TV's "Kalakka Povathu Yaaru", a weekly show promoting stand-up comedy in the Tamil language. Around the same time, he also performed in Raj TV's "Sirippom Sindhippom", and "Agada Vigadam", a literary debate show moderated by the famous poet Dr. Abdul Kadhar. He performed in Sun TV's "Asatha Povathu Yaaru?" and was crowned the "Asathal Mannan" award in 2007. Ramanathan competed in Vijay TV's "Tamil Paechu Engal Moochu", an oratorical competition in Tamil, in 2009 and repeatedly impressed the judges and the audience every week. He also moderated and judged a comedy themed debate show for Podhigai TV as a special feature of its Pongal programs in 2011. Presently he is participating in "Masala cafe" show in "SUN LIFE" Channel which is broadcast from 9-10pm.

Ramanathan has traveled around the world, giving speeches and stand-up comedy performances upon invitations from various organizations.

== Awards ==
- 2002 Murasoli Arakatalai - First Prize in state level Recitation competition
- 2004 Rajalakshmi Ammaiyar Award - First Prize in state level oration competition
- 2006 Vijay TV's "Kalaka povathu Yaaru“ - "Comedy King" Award in prelims and "Comedy King-Runner" Award in Finals
- 2007 Sun TV's "Asatha povathu Yaaru" - "Asathal Mannan" Award
