= Centre d'Etudes des Crises et Conflits Internationaux =

Research center at the University of Louvain

Coordinates: 50°40′3.72″N 4°36′42.38″E

The CECRI (Centre d'Etude des Crises et Conflits Internationaux) is a research centre at University of Louvain (UCLouvain), Belgium. Its central aim is to provide analyses and to conduct academic research on contemporary international crises and conflicts. It currently hosts 19 research members, plus associates, and the current head is Prof. Amine Ait-Chaalal.

== Research ==
Research at CECRI is organized around three topics:

- Memory and conflict resolution
- International management of the conflicts in the 21st century
- Powers on the international scene: geopolitics and foreign policy

These research programmes are launched for a renewable period of five years. They guide the priorities of the CECRI's activity at every level (publication, networks, teaching...).

== Teaching ==
As a part of the School of political and social sciences of the faculté des Sciences Politiques, Economiques, Sociales et de Communication of the Université Catholique de Louvain, CECRI plays a role in the formation of the students in international relations.

- Master in political sciences: international relations
  - Diplomacy and conflict resolution
  - Humanitarian action (NOHA master)
- Certificate in international relations and conflict analysis (e-learning)
- Doctoral school and CECRI's seminars
- Preparation for the Belgian diplomatic competitive examination

== Partnerships and international networks ==
The CECRI is involved in the networks on international relations.

- CISMOC (Centre interdisciplinaire d'étude de l'Islam dans le monde contemporain)
- CERMAC (Centre d'étude et de recherche sur le monde arabe contemporain)
- Inbev - Baillet Latour chairs dedicated to the study of Russia and China
- NOHA (Network on Humanitarian Action)
- ROP (Francophone Research network on peace operations)
