= Karaikudi taluk =

Administrative division of Tamil Nadu, India

Coordinates: 10.07°N 78.78°E

Karaikudi taluk is a taluk of Sivagangai district of the Indian state of Tamil Nadu. The headquarters of the taluk is the city of Karaikudi

== Demographics ==
According to the 2011 census, the taluk of Karaikudi had a population of 300,811 with 149,602 males and 151,209 females. There were 1011 women for every 1000 men. The taluk had a literacy rate of 77.23. Child population in the age group below 6 was 24,571 Males and 23,983 Females A request has been made to the government to separate Karaikudi into a corporation and soon a separate district.

.
