= Ariyakudi =

Ariyakudi Southern Tirupati
- Village
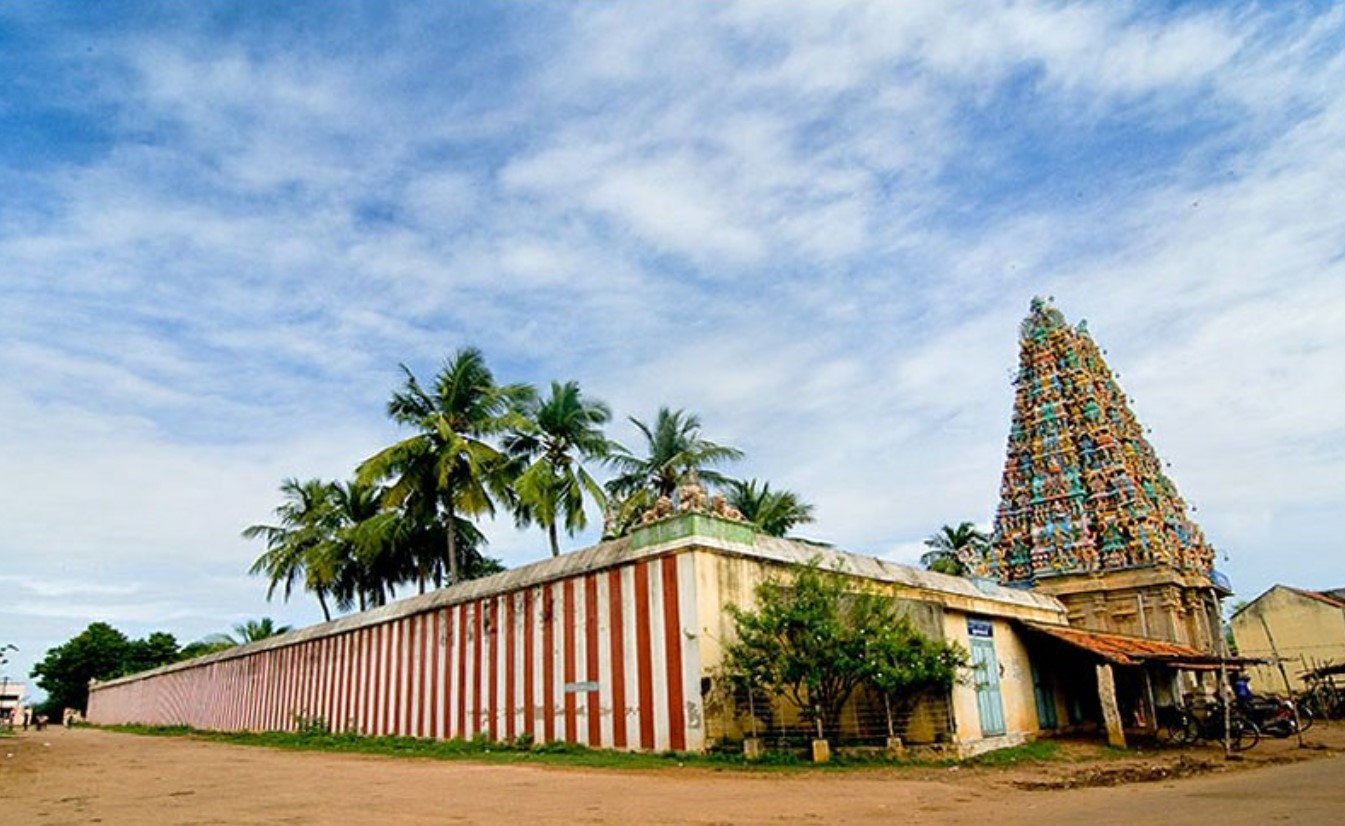
- Nickname: Then Tirupathi
- Location in South Karaikudi, Tamil Nadu, India
- Coordinates: 10.048135°N 78.787637°E
- Country: India
- State: Tamil Nadu
- District: Sivaganga

Government
  - Body: Karaikudi City Municipal Corporation
- Elevation: 77 m (253 ft)

Population (2011)
  - Total: 5,368

Languages
  - Official: Tamil
- Time zone: UTC+5:30 (IST)
- PIN: 630202
- Telephone code: 04565
- Vehicle registration: TN63Z

Ariyakudi is situated in the southern part of Karaikudi Municipal Corporation in the Sivaganga District. It is situated approximately 5 kilometers southeast from the centre of Karaikudi city, it has a population of 5,368 as of 2011. It has total of 9 wards. The village is accessible via local town buses that connect Karaikudi and Devakottai with the surrounding villages.

== Temples ==
The town has several ancient temples such as the 500-year-old Thiruvengadamudaiyan temple, the largest Perumal temple in Karaikudi area, Shivan temple, Chellaiyi Amman temple, and Venkanayagi Amman temple. Annually, a 13-day festival is held at the Perumal Temple, concluding by the end of May. Additionally, the gates of the heavenly Temples are opened here on the auspicious day of Vaikunda Yekadesi.

== Lamps and Idols Manufacturers ==
Ariyakudi village is renowned for crafting diverse sizes of elephant lamps. It is known for its traditional and artistic brass lamps, along with rare-earth metal-based religious idols. Over twenty factories produce these metal lamps and various temple idols, distributed to key pilgrimage sites like Palani, Thiruchendur, Sabarimala temples, and even to several foreign countries. Additionally, Chettinad lamps and various metal utensils required for weddings and other events are manufactured here.

== Notable people ==
- Ariyakudi Ramanuja Iyengar
