= Puduvayal =

Puduvayal Rice mill town
- Town
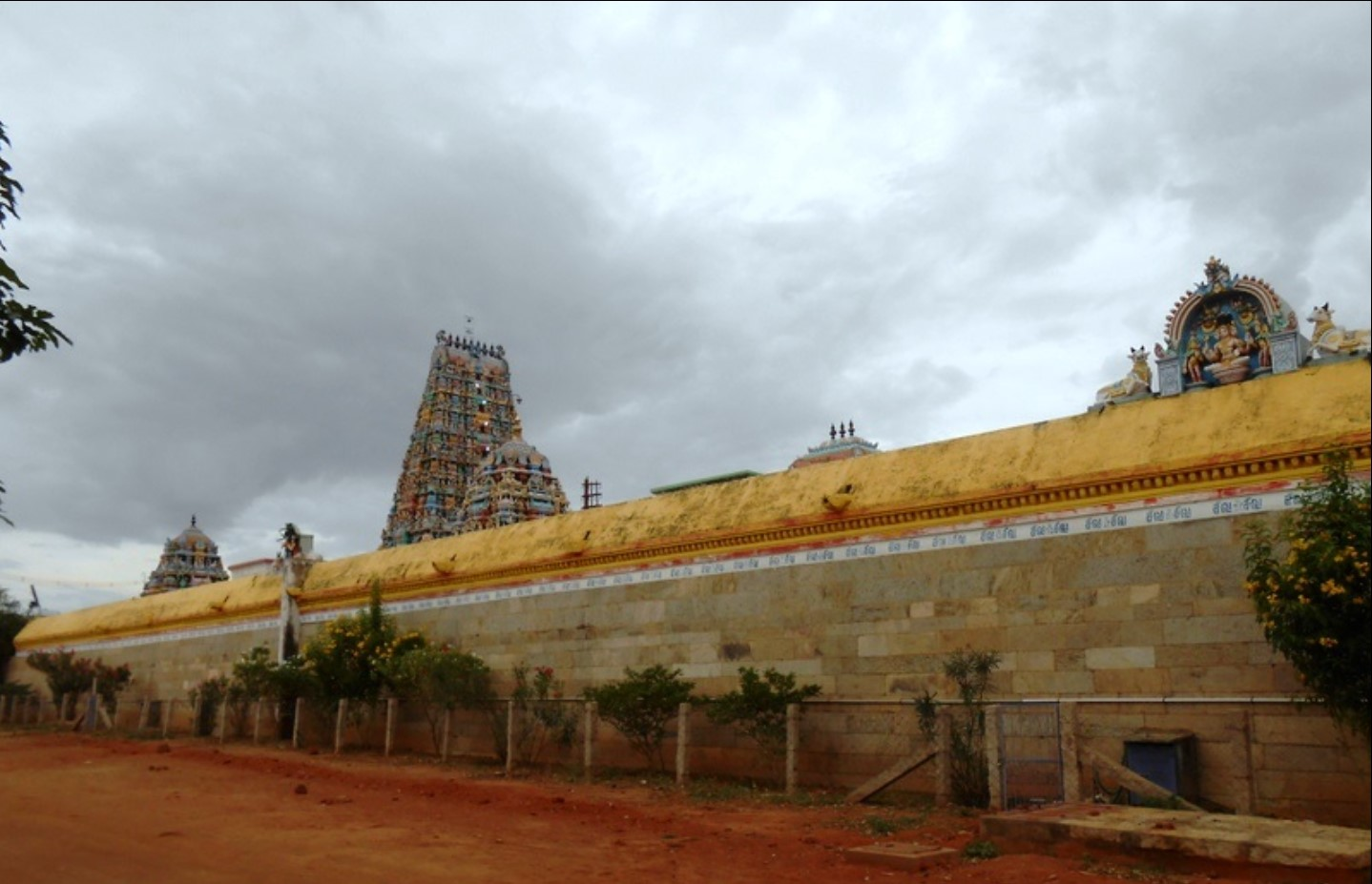

- Location in Tamil Nadu, India
- Coordinates: 10.1°N 78.845°E
- Country: India
- State: Tamil Nadu
- District: Sivaganga

Population
  - Total: around 10,000
- Demonym: Puduvayalian

Languages
  - Official: Tamil
- Time zone: UTC+5:30 (IST)
- Vehicle registration: TN-63
- Website: www.puduvayal.in

Puduvayal is an area in north-eastern part of Karaikudi Municipal Corporation, Sivaganga district in the Indian state of Tamil Nadu. It is a town located in the Chettinad region of the Sivagangai district. On road, it is 12 km away from centre of Karaikudi and 21 km away from Aranthangi. This town is famous for its rice mills. Puduvayal is the 2nd largest rice producer in Tamil Nadu. Puduvayal is an important commercial centre for trade in the Sivaganga district and it has been part of the Karaikudi Municipal Corporation after the city limit reformation as per government announcement. The town is famous for its Veerasekara Umaiyambigai Temple (Sakkottai area). Nearby Kandanur is famous for Kandanur Sivan Kovil—which is a replica of the Madurai Meenakshi Temple—built by Nagarthars.

== Location ==
The town is situated in the Sivagangai District. It is about 10 kilometers from Karaikudi on the Karaikudi-Aranthangi road in Tamil Nadu, India. Its geographical coordinates are 13.19°N 80.10°E and its original name (with diacritics) is Puduvāyal. The town is at an altitude of 39 ft. Its pincode is 630–108.

== Transportation ==
There is a railway station in the town on the Karaikudi - Mayiladuthurai converted in to broad-gauge. The town is connected by road with all important cities. The frequent town buses are available from karaikudi old bus stand to puduvayal bus stand. Regular bus services are available from Chennai, Karaikudi, Paramakudi, Madurai, Pattukkottai, Aranthangi, Alangudi, Devakottai, Sivagangai, Rameshwaram, Embel, Pudukkottai, Peraoorani, Nagoor, Tiruvarur, kottaipattanam, other towns and nearby villages .The town is very close to The city karaikudi that connecting buses from all the important cities of Tamilnadu.The town has a large number of rice mills and therefore, has a heavy influx of goods carriers.

== Education ==
- Ramanathan Chettiar Higher Secondary School
- Sri Saraswathi Vidhyalaya Girls Higher Secondary School
- Sri saraswathi vidhya salai
- Ramanathan Chettiar Elementary School
- Al-Ameen Nursery School
- Sri Kalaimagal Vidhyalaya Matric School
- Valliammai Achi Montessori School
- Sri Vidhyagiri Matriculation School
- Sri Vidhyagiri Arts & Science College
- Abdul Kalam College of Nursing & Catering
- Annamalai Para-Medical College

== Sports ==
Kamaraj Nagar Football Club (KNFC) is a football club based in Kamaraj Nagar, Puduvayal. Established in 2008, the club is affiliated with the Sivagangai District Football Association and is registered with MY Bharat under the Ministry of Youth Affairs and Sports. The club promotes grassroots football and has contributed players to state-level competitions, including representation in the Tamil Nadu Santosh Trophy.

The New Land Football Club (NLFC) is the most famed club in the village, they conduct a tournament every year, which is a huge crowd-pulling event. Friends Volleyball Club was founded here in 1986. This club hosts tournaments every year where teams from all over India participate. There are many famous cricket teams here, such as: WALLS-108 (only quick matches), and RCC.

786 Cricket Club is a famous cricket team in this town they conducted tournaments every year. They host cricket tournaments every year.

== Demographics ==
As of a 2001 Indian census males constitute of 50% of the population and females, 50%. Puduvayal has an average literacy rate of 74%, higher than the national average of 59.5%: male literacy is 81%, and female literacy is 66%. In Puduvayal, 12% of the population is under 6 years of age.
