= Central Electro Chemical Research Institute =

Government research institute in New Dehli, India

Coordinates: 10°5′0.76″N 78°48′0.3″E

CSIR - Central Electro Chemical Research Institute
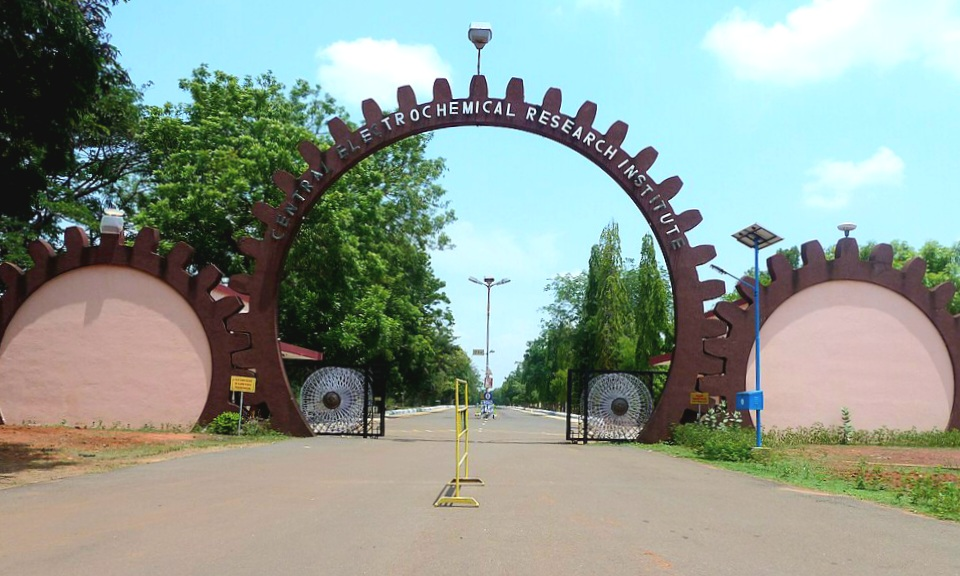
- Entrance of CECRI
- Motto: Your Destination for Innovative Research
- Established: 1953; 73 years ago
- Affiliations: CSIR
- Director: Dr. K. Ramesha
- Location: College Road, Sekkalakkottai, Karaikudi - 630003
- Campus: 300 Acres; Urban
- Website: http://www.cecri.res.in/

Central Electro Chemical Research Institute, founded on 25 July 1948 at Karaikudi in Tamil Nadu, CECRI came into existence in January 1953. It is the largest Electrochemical research institute in South Asia and is one of the largest research institutes for Electrochemistry in the world. It is one of a chain of forty national laboratories under the aegis of the Council of Scientific and Industrial Research (CSIR) in New Delhi.

== Regional Centres ==
- CECRI Chennai Unit, CSIR Complex, TTTI, Taramani, Chennai
- CECRI Corrosion Research Centre, Mandapam Camp
