= Kandanur =

- panchayat town
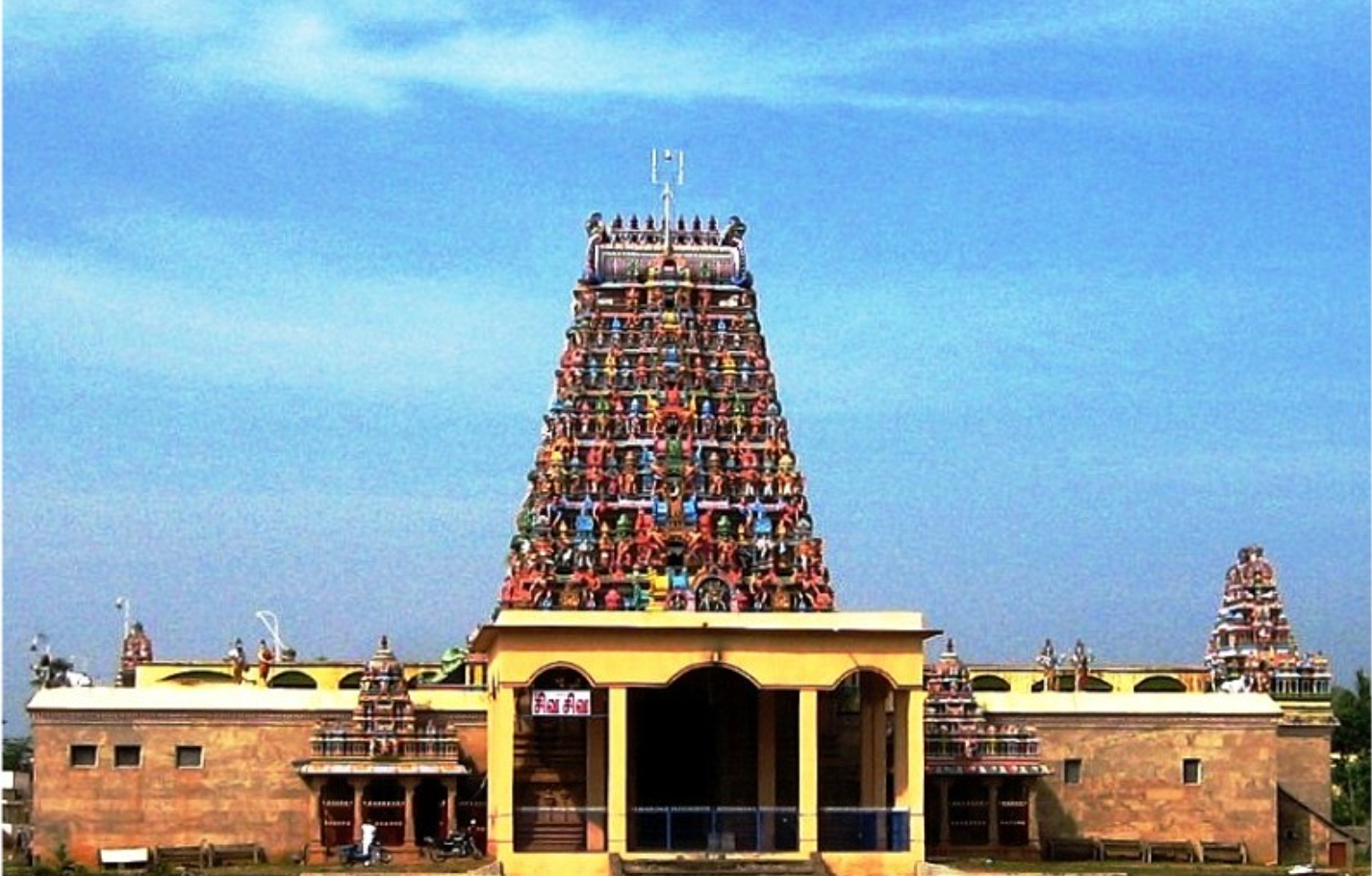

- Location in Tamil Nadu, India
- Coordinates: 10.105°N 78.825°E
- Country: India
- State: Tamil Nadu
- District: Sivaganga

Government
  - Body: Karaikudi City Municipal Corporation

Languages
  - Official: Tamil
- Time zone: UTC+5:30 (IST)

Kandanur is a part of karaikudi city Municipal corporation in Karaikudi taluk, in the Indian state of Tamil Nadu. This town is famous for Kandaneswarar Sivan Kovil, which is a replica to the Madurai Meenakshi Amman temple built by Nagarathars community and few other Temples have been built by Nattars -Vallambars. Kandanur Perumal temple is equally popular in the area. Also, near by town Puduvayal is famous for its Veerasekara Umaiyambigai Temple (Sakkottai area). Another temple, Sri Mahalakshmi Temple and Muthu Mariamman Temple, Palaiyur, Kandanur. Palaniappan Chidambaram is an Indian politician and former attorney who currently serves as Member of Parliament, Rajya Sabha and formerly served as the Union Minister of Finance of India is from Kandanur

== Demographics ==
As of 2011 India census, Kandanur had a population of 7617. Males constitute 49% of the population and females 51%. Kandanur has an average literacy rate of 69%, higher than the national average of 59.5%: male literacy is 76%, and female literacy is 63%. In Kandanur, 12% of the population is under 6 years of age.

== Notable people ==
- P.Chidambaram, Former Union Minister of Finance India and Union Home Minister of India.
