= Sankarapuram =

- Town
- Sankarapuram, Sivaganga district, Tamil Nadu
- Coordinates: 10.0486°N 78.7482°E
- Country: India
- State: Tamil Nadu
- District: Sivaganga
- Named for: Agriculture

Government
  - Type: Town panchayat
  - Body: Karaikudi City Municipal Corporation

Area
  - Total: 22.69 km^{2} (8.76 sq mi)
- Elevation: 105.39 m (345.8 ft)

Population (2011)
  - Total: 26,536
- Time zone: UTC+5:30 (IST)
- PIN: 630302
- Telephone code: 04565******
- Vehicle registration: TN63Z

Sankarapuram is a census town panchayat of Sivaganga district in the southern Indian state of Tamil Nadu. This census town is located in southwestern Karaikudi on national highway NH536. Currently the town panchayat has 15 wards with two villages consisting of Sakkottai and Sankarapuram, administered by village officers.

As of the 2011 census, Sankarapuram has a population of 26,536, of which 13,283 are males and 13,253 are females. Children aged 0-6 make up 10.48% of the population, at 2,781. The female sex ratio is 998, compared to the state average of 996. Moreover, the child sex ratio is 960, compared to the state average of 943. The literacy rate is 91.65%, which is higher than the state average of 80.09%. Male literacy is 95.02% while female literacy is 88.29%. It has total administration over 6,854 houses to which it supplies basic amenities like water and sewerage. As announced by government of Tamil Nadu on March 15 2024, Sankarapuram is expected to be a part of Karaikudi Municipal Corporation.

Due to the COVID-19 pandemic, Sankarapuram is planning to have a permanent primary health care centre.
