= Devakottai =

Devakottai Divine Fort
- Municipality
- Nagara Sivan Temple

- Devakottai, Tamil Nadu
- Coordinates: 9°57′19.4″N 78°48′58.3″E
- Country: India
- State: Tamil Nadu
- District: Sivaganga
- Region: Chettinad
- Named for: DeviKottai & DevarKottai

Government
  - Type: First Grade Municipality
  - Body: Devakottai Municipality
  - Chairman: K.Sundaralingam (ADMK)

Area
  - Total: 12.42 km^{2} (4.80 sq mi)
- Elevation: 77 m (253 ft)

Population (2011)
  - Total: 51,865 (City Population)
  - Rank: 3rd in Sivaganga District
  - Density: 4,176/km^{2} (10,820/sq mi)

Languages
  - Official: Tamil
- Time zone: UTC+5:30 (IST)
- PIN: 630302
- Telephone code: 914561
- Vehicle registration: TN-63
- Nearest city: Karaikudi
- Sex ratio: 19910:20587 ♂/♀
- Literacy: 80%
- Lok Sabha constituency: Sivaganga
- State Legislative Assembly: Karaikudi
- Website: municipality.tn.gov.in

Devakottai is a town in the state of Tamil Nadu, India. Located in the Sivaganga district, the town is situated close to the Karaikudi, near Rameswaram National Highway Road (NH-210). It is one of the major cities comes under the Chettinad area with rich heritage of houses built with limestone called "Karai Veedu". This Region is one of the towns in Chettinad belt. The town is famous for its ancient temple Sri Meenakshi Sundareswarar temple also known as Nagara Sivan Kovil.

As per the 2011 census of India, the town had a population of 51,865.

== Etymology ==
The name 'Devakottai' is derived from the Tamil word 'Devi Kottai'. It was one of the towns where Nattukottai Nagarathar once lived in Kaveripoompattinam in the Chola Empire. In honor of it, when they migrated to the Pandya Empire, they named the new town as Devi Kottai. Later on, the town became known as 'Devakottai'.

== History ==
Devakottai was an active town in the Indian Independence Movement. The municipal court of Devakottai was burned to the ground during the Quit India Movement. This leads to the town becoming one of the historical landmarks of Tamil Nadu with typical building structures and monuments.

Devakottai is now under the Karaikudi constituency following the reformation of constituencies. However, for parliamentary elections, it comes under the Sivaganga constituency.

== Arrival of Mahatma Gandhi ==
Mahatma Gandhi visited Devakottai in Tamil Nadu on January 27, 1934, during his Harijan Tour, addressing a public meeting to support Dalit upliftment and mediating caste disputes, leading to the establishment of a school for Dalits nearby; Devakottai also saw significant Quit India Movement activity in 1942, with local freedom fighters inspired by Gandhi's call for independence. His connection to the region is also preserved through letters at the Gandhi Memorial Museum in Madurai.

== Demographics ==
Religious census
Religion	Percent(%)
Hindu	82.85%
Muslim	9.92%
Christian	7.0%
Sikh	0.02%
Jain	0.01%
Other	0.2%

Devakottai is Taluk in Tamil Nadu state, Devakottai Taluk population in 2022 is 97,327. According to 2011 census of India, Total Devakottai population is 76,037 people are living in this Taluk, of which 38,448 are male and 37,589 are female. Population of Devakottai in 2021 is 94,286 Literate people are 54,080 out of 30,517 are male and 23,563 are female. Total workers are 42,674 depends on multi skills out of which 24,638 are men and 18,036 are women. Total 13,697 Cultivators are depended on agriculture farming out of 8,297 are cultivated by men and 5,400 are women. 5,900 people works in agricultural land as a labour in Devakottai, men are 3,069 and 2,831 are women. Scheduled Castes and Scheduled Tribes accounted for 8.5% and 0.16% of the population respectively. The average literacy of the town was 80.95%, compared to the national average of 72.99%. In total, the town had 13192 households. In particular, there were a total of 18,696 workers, comprising 865 cultivators, 415 main agricultural laborers, 219 in house hold industries, 14,056 other workers, 3,141 marginal workers, 53 marginal cultivators, 1,011 marginal agricultural laborers, 58 marginal workers in household industries and 2,019 other marginal workers. As per the religious census of 2011, Devakottai had 82.85% Hindus, 9.92% Muslims, 7.% Christians, 0.02% Sikhs, 0.01% Jains and 0.2% following other religions.

== Transport ==
Devakottai is situated on Tiruchirappalli-Rameswaram National Highway Road (NH-210).

=== Airport ===
The nearest airport is in Madurai, about 92 km away.

=== Rail ===
The nearest major railway station is Devakottai Road railway station.

=== Bus ===
Devakottai have a major bus stand namely Aringar Anna Bus Stand. There are frequent bus services available in Devakottai. Regular bus services are available to all important cities of Tamil Nadu.

== Education ==
Ananda College is located in Devakottai.

== Administration ==
• Sivaganga District have three Educational District, Among three Devakottai is One of the Educational District of Sivaganga.

• Sivaganga District have only two revenue division, Among two Devakottai is One of the revenue division of Sivaganga.

• Devakottai is One of the Taluk of Sivaganga District Among 9 Taluks

== Notable people ==
- A. R. Lakshmanan, supreme court justice
- Devakottai Ramanathan, stand-up comedian
- Vasanth, director
