= Madras and Southern Mahratta Railway =

Railway company that operated in southern India

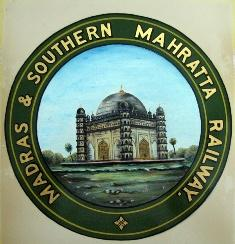
- Industry: Railways
- Predecessor: Madras Railway, Southern Mahratta Railway
- Successor: South Indian Railway
- Headquarters: India
- Services: Rail transport

The Madras and Southern Mahratta Railway was a railway company that operated in southern India. It was founded on 1 January 1908 by merging the Madras Railway and the Southern Mahratta Railway.

Initially, its headquarters was at Royapuram in Madras but was later shifted to a newly constructed building at Egmore, which was inaugurated on 11 December 1922. On 1 April 1944, its management was taken over directly by the Government of India. On 14 April 1951, the Madras and South Mahratta Railway, the South Indian Railway and the Mysore State Railway were merged to form the Southern Railway, one of the 16 zones of the Indian Railways.

== Rolling stock ==
In 1936 the company owned 663 locomotives, 1561 coaches and 15.092 goods wagons.

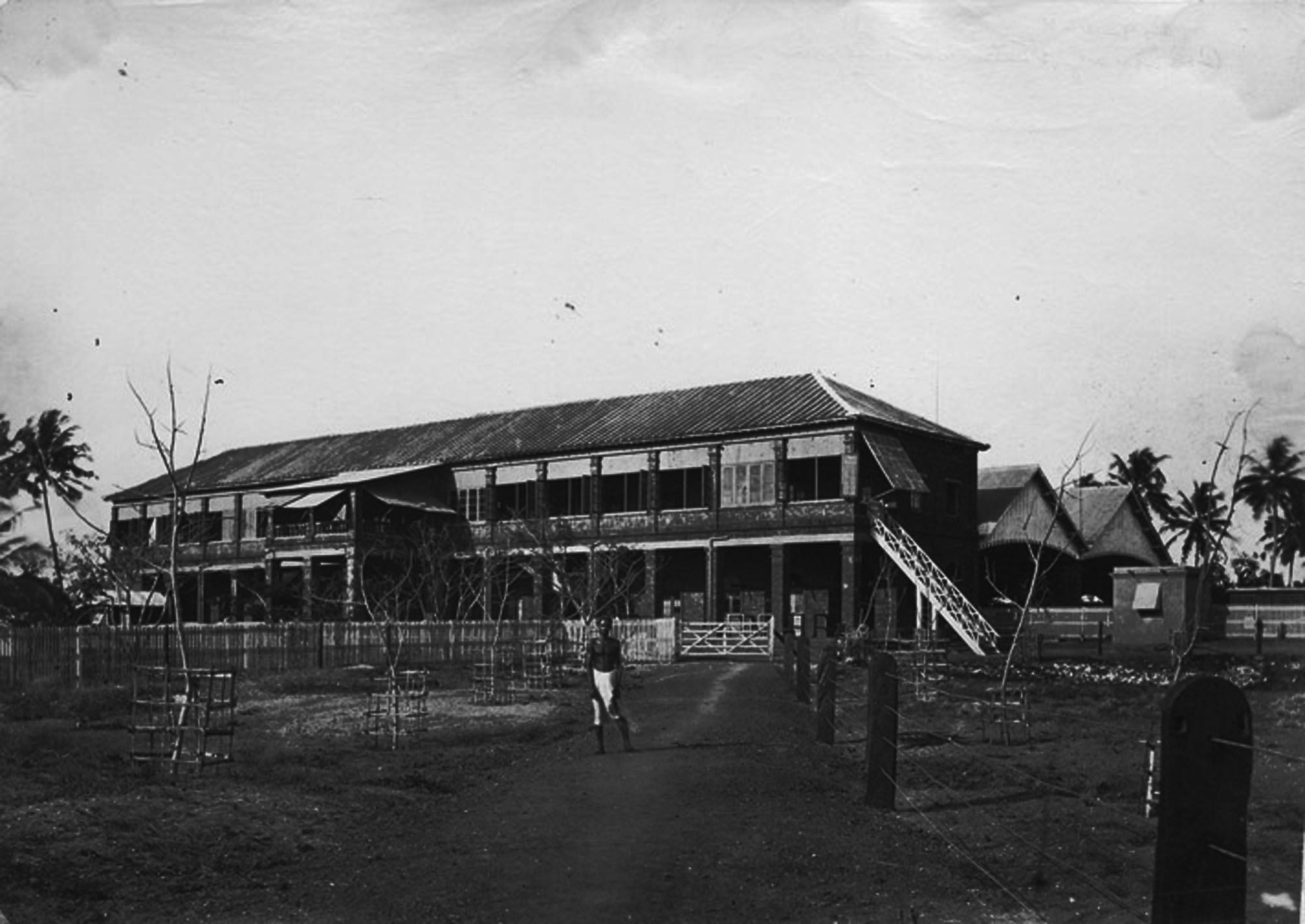
Beypore Railway Station at Chaliyam, Malabar District, which, for a short period, was the western terminus of Madras Railway

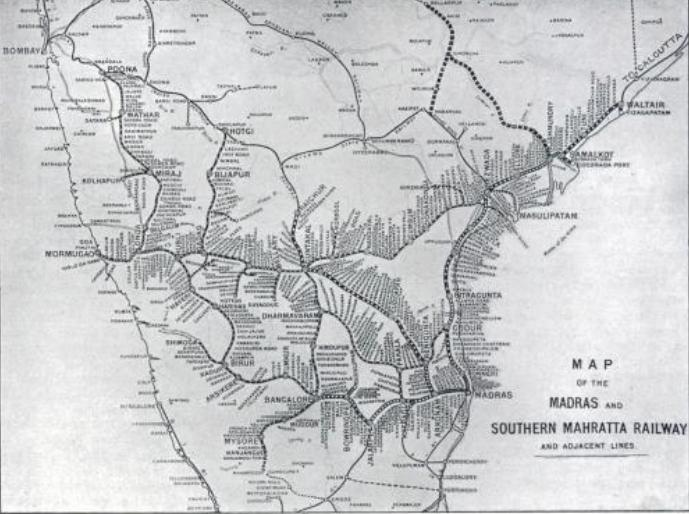
Map of the Madras and South Mahratta Railway lines

== Classification ==
It was labeled as a Class I railway according to Indian Railway Classification System of 1926.

== See also ==
- Nizam's Guaranteed State Railway
