= Karaikudi Municipal Corporation =

Indian civic governing body

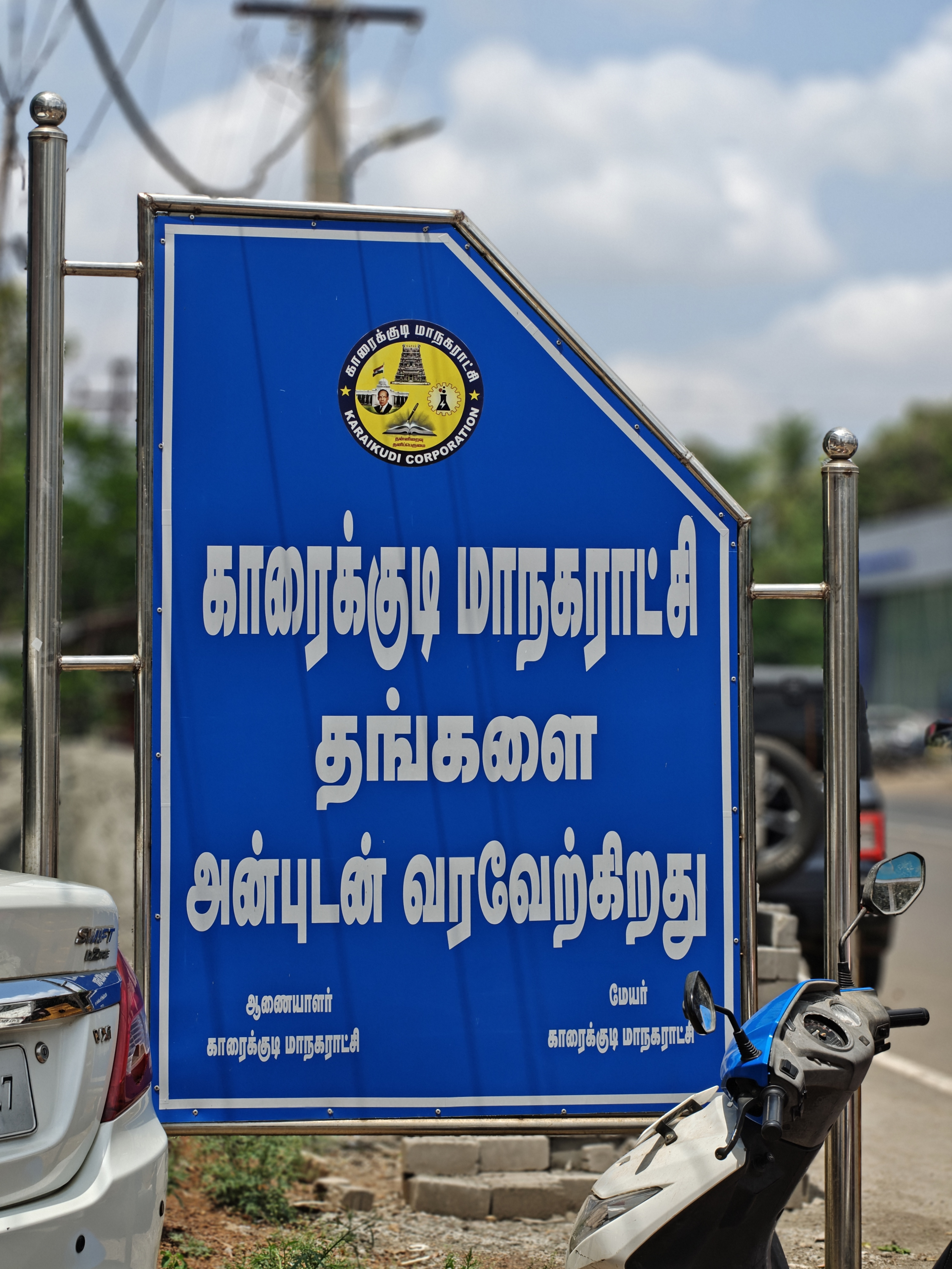
Karaikudi Municipal Corporation Karaikudi City Corporation Welcome Board

Type
- Type: Municipal Corporation

History
- Founded: March 15, 2024; 2 years ago

Leadership
- Mayor: S. Muthudurai
- Deputy Mayor: N. Gunasekaran
- Commissioner: S. Chithra

Meeting place
- Municipal Complex, Karaikudi

Karaikudi Municipal Corporation is the civic body governing Karaikudi in the Indian state of Tamil Nadu. On 15 March 2024, it was established as the 22nd municipal corporation in the state. It is headed by the mayor, who presides over the city council, and is administered by the corporation commissioner.

Karaikudi municipality was established in 1928 and was upgraded to a grade II municipality in 1973, to selection grade in 1988, to a special grade in 2013. The functions of the city corporation are divided into six departments: general administration/personnel, Engineering, Revenue, Public Health, city planning and information technology.

The corporation administers the Karaikudi metropolitan area which incorporates the city of Karaikudi and adjoining towns of Kottaiyur, Kandanur, Puduvayal and Sankarapuram and Surrounding villages of Kalanivasal, Sekkalai Kottai, Ilupakkudi, Ariyakudi, Koviloor, Managiri and Senjai. It encompassed an area of 33.75 km^{2} (13.03 sq mi) and had had a population of 106,784 individuals as per the 2011 census. Based on the expanded limits, the town was demarcated into 48 wards.
