= Karaikudi =

- Municipal corporation
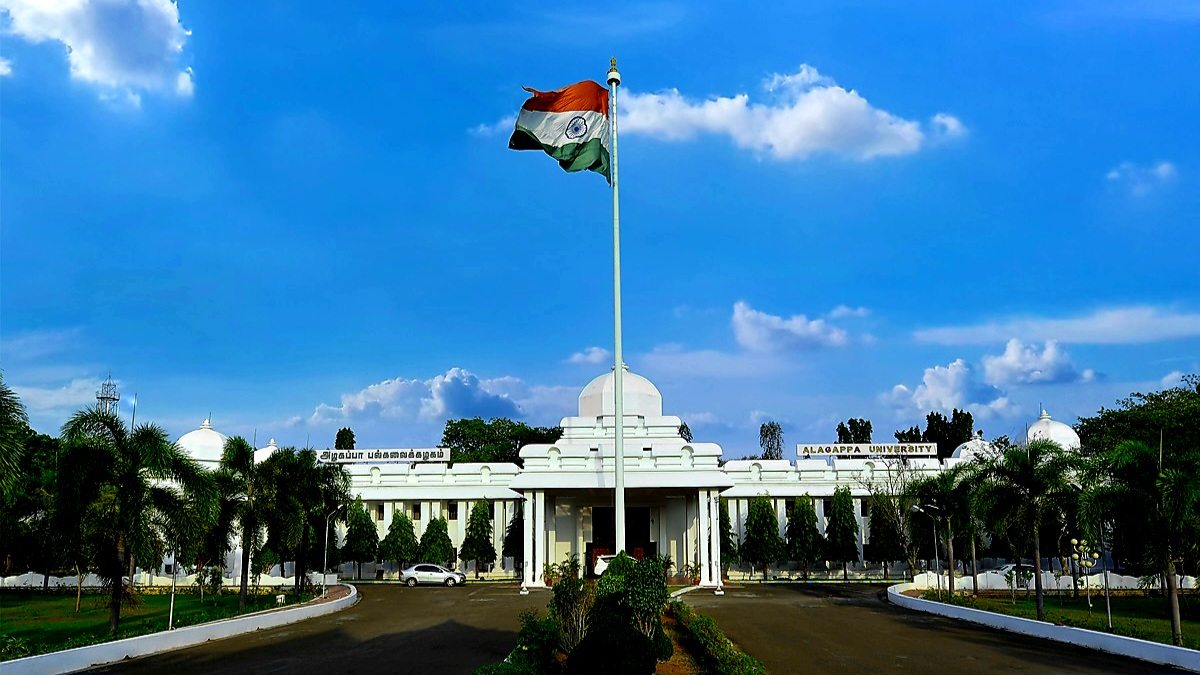
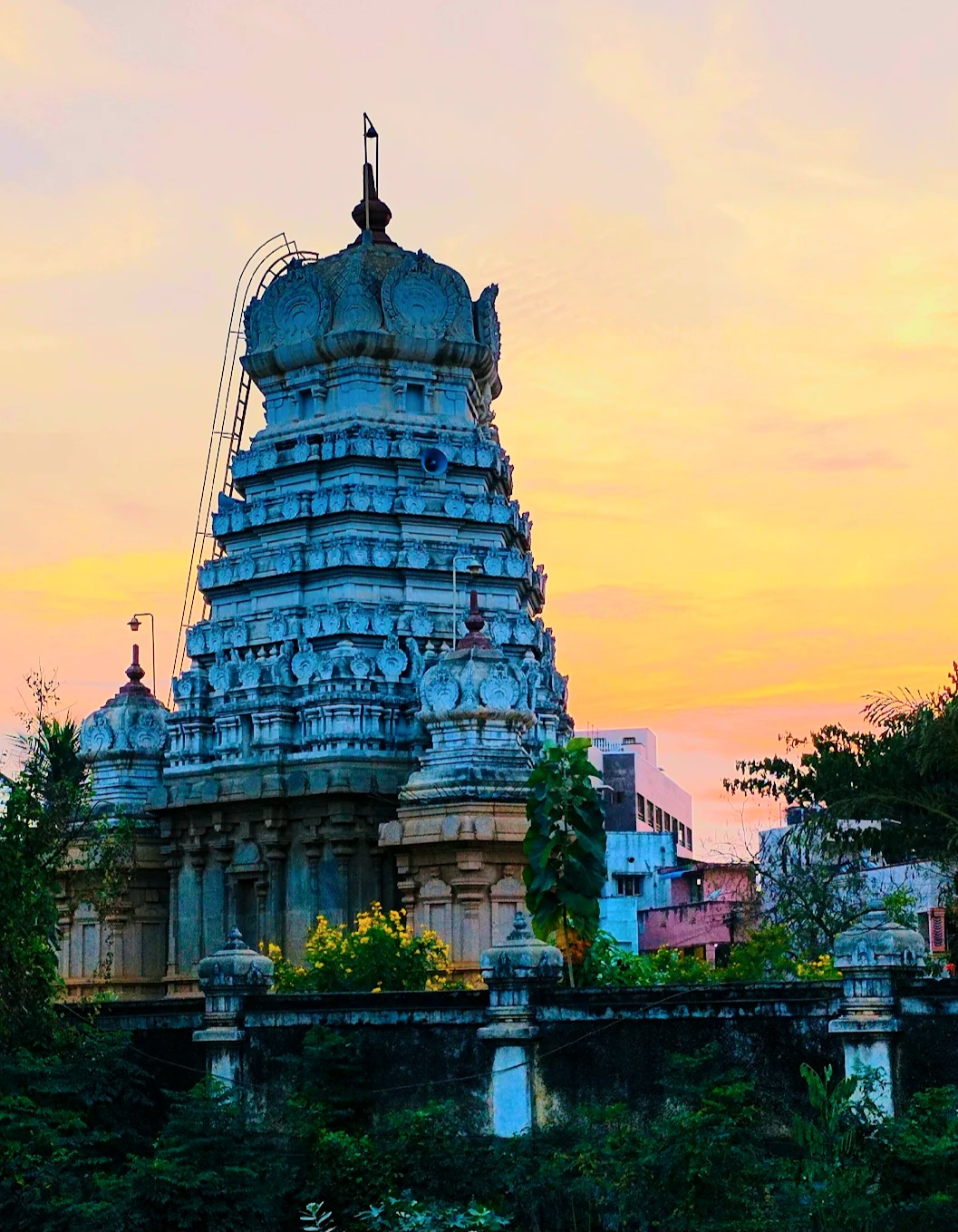
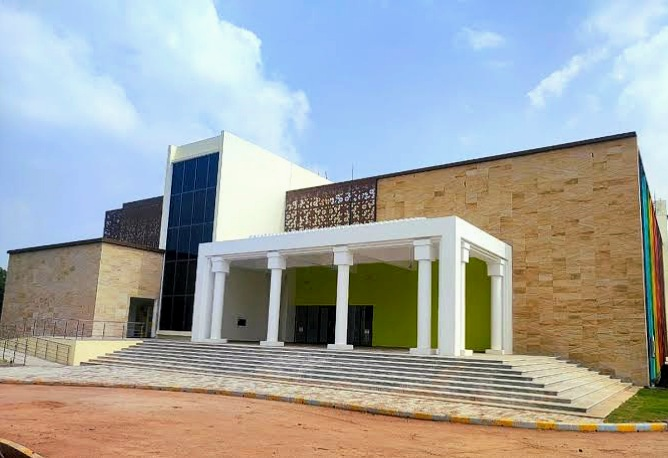
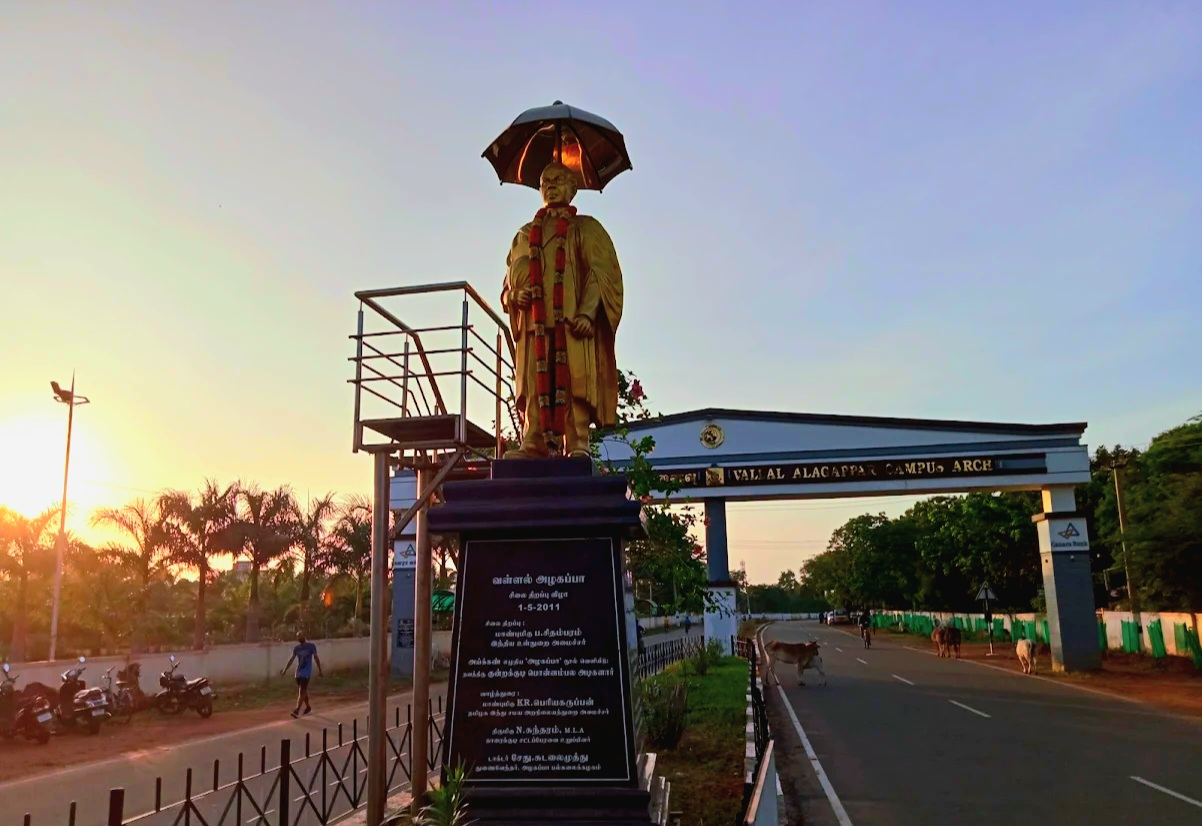
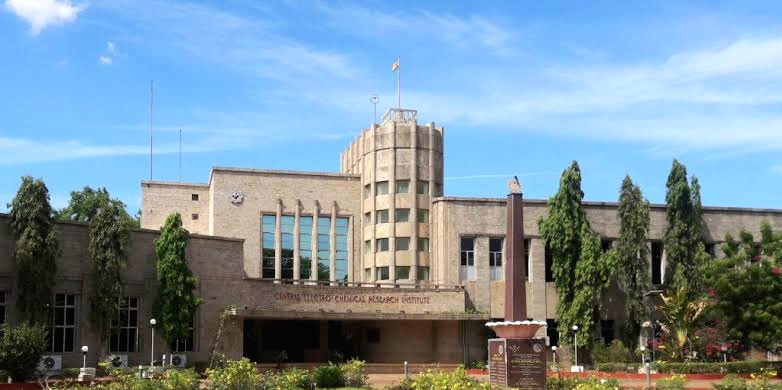
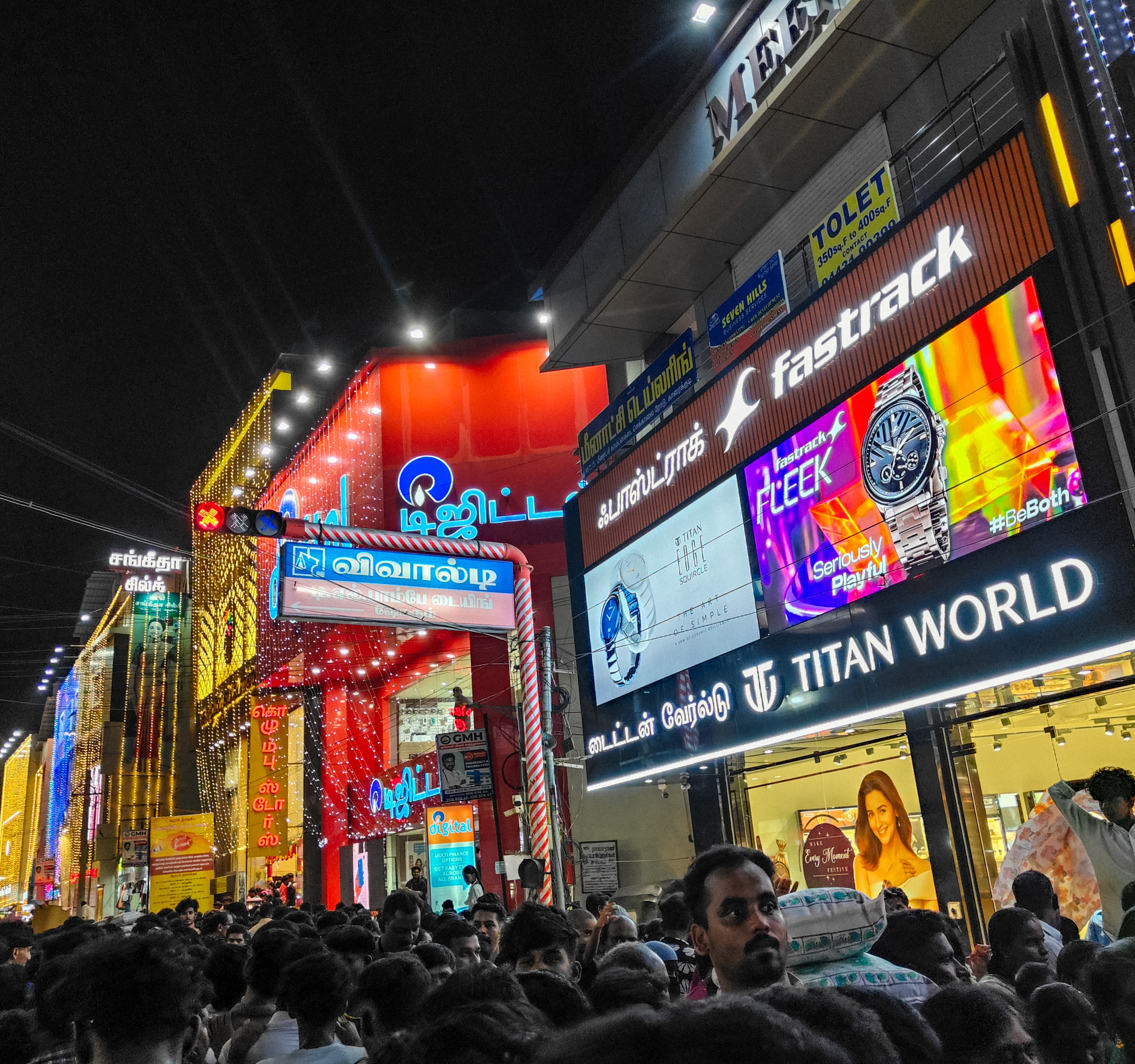
- Alagappa University Tamil Thai Temple Valar Tamil Noolagam Alagappa Chettiar Arch Central Electrochemical Research Institute Sekkalai Road

- Karaikudi, Tamil Nadu, India.
- Coordinates: 10.073500°N 78.773200°E
- Country: India
- State: Tamil Nadu
- District: Sivaganga
- Region: Chettinad
- Established: 1801
- Named for: Karai plant

Government
  - Body: Karaikudi Municipal Corporation
  - Mayor: S. Muthudurai (DMK)

Area
  - Total: 13.75 km^{2} (5.31 sq mi)
- Elevation: 118 m (387 ft)

Population (2011)
  - Total: 303,714
  - Rank: 30th
  - Density: 22,090/km^{2} (57,210/sq mi)

Languages
  - Official: Tamil, English
- Time zone: UTC+5:30 (IST)
- PIN: 630001
- STD code: 04565
- Vehicle registration: TN-63Z
- Website: tnurbantree.tn.gov.in/karaikudi/

Karaikudi is a city and municipal corporation in Sivaganga district in the Indian state of Tamil Nadu. It is the largest city in the district, and the centre of the Karaikudi Metropolitan Area, that forms part of the Chettinad region.

Karaikudi is administered by the Karaikudi Municipal Corporation, which was established in 2024. It forms part of the Karaikudi Assembly constituency, which elects a member to the Tamil Nadu Legislative Assembly, and is a part of the Sivaganga Lok Sabha constituency, which elects its member to the Lok Sabha. It is one of the cities selected for development under the Atal Mission for Rejuvenation and Urban Transformation project of the Government of India in 2015.

== History ==
The name Karaikudi might have been derived from the thorny plant karai or the type of houses in the area built with limestone called 'karai'. The town was established in the early 19th century, and the oldest known structure is the Koppudaiya Nayagi Amman temple. In the 20th century, the town became a trading center, which led to further development of housing and industries in the region. During the Indian Independence movement, Bharathiyar visited Karaikudi in 1919 to participate in an event, and Mahatma Gandhi visited the town in 1927. After Indian independence, the town saw significant growth in the industrial sector.

== Geography ==
Karaikudi is located in Sivagangai district in the Chettinad region. The Thennar River flows through the southern part of the town. The town has predominantly flat terrain, with rocky crystalline formations concentrated on the western side, along with clay and limestone deposits. The region has red laterite soil, generally unsuitable for agriculture. Other types of soil such as alluvial soil are found in certain patches. Groundwater is typically found at shallow depths of 3–6 ft (0.91–1.83 m), and rises during the monsoon. The region has a tropical climate with hot summer with average temperature of 37 °C (99 °F), and mild winter with average temperature of 22 °C (72 °F). The town receives an average annual rainfall of about 87.28 cm (34.36 in), with almost 60% of the rainfall coming from the northeast monsoon.

== Demographics ==
Religions in Karaikudi (2011)
Religion	Percent
Hinduism	83.9%
Islam	11.4%
Christianity	4.3%
Other or not stated	0.4%

As per the 2011 census, Karaikudi had a population of 106,714 inhabitants with a sex ratio of 1,000 females for every 1,000 males. There were 10,619 children under the age of six, consisting of 5,405 males and 5,214 females. The child sex ratio was 965 girls per 1000 boys. The average literacy rate was 90.49% of which male and female literacy was 94.71% and 86.29% respectively. There were about 11,040 in slums which housed a population of 44,025 inhabitants. This is around 41.26% of total population of Karaikkudi city. The larger Karaikudi Metropolitan Area had a population of 181,851 as per the census. Hinduism is the majority religion with 83.9% of the population adhering to it, followed by Islam (11.4)%, and Christianity (4.3%).

== Administration and politics ==
Elected members
Mayor	S. Muthudurai (DMK)
Member of Legislative Assembly	T.K.Prabhu (TVK)
Member of Parliament	Karti Chidambaram (INC)

Karaikudi was constituted as a municipality on 9 May 1928, and was upgraded to Second Grade in 1973, to Selection Grade on 14 December 1988, and to special grade on 28 May 2013. The Karaikudi Municipal Corporation was established in 2024. The city covers an area of 13.75 km^{2} (5.31 sq mi). The larger Karaikudi planning area consists of the town and the nearby town panchayat of Kottaiyur and ten other revenue villages. The corporation has 36 wards, each represented by an elected councillor. It is headed by a mayor, who is elected by the councilors. The functions of the municipality are devolved into six departments: general administration/personnel, engineering, revenue, public health, city planning and information technology. It is one of the cities selected for development under the Atal Mission for Rejuvenation and Urban Transformation project of the Government of India in 2015.

Karaikudi is a part of the Karaikudi assembly constituency, which elects a member to the Tamil Nadu Legislative Assembly and forms part of the Sivaganga Lok Sabha constituency that elects it member to the Lok Sabha. Law and order is maintained by the Sivaganga sub division of the Tamil Nadu Police, which operates three police stations, and is headed by a deputy superintendent.

== Culture ==
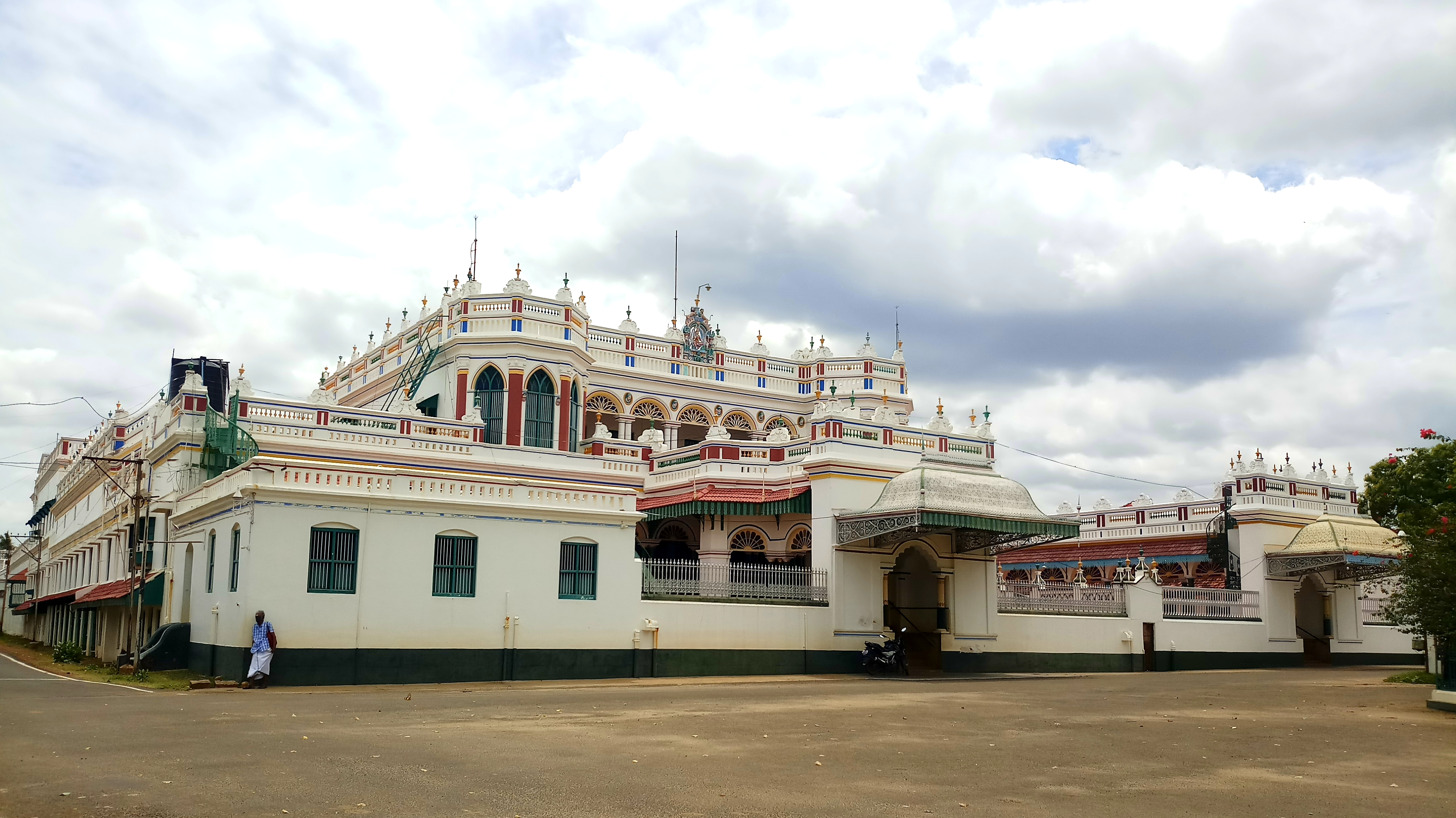
A palatial mansion in Chettinad region

Karaikudi and the surrounding villages are the center of the Chettinad culture. The region consists of buildings and palatial mansions built in the unique Chettinad architecture from the 1850's to 1940s. The 'thousand window' house and the place of the Raja of Chettinad are notable examples of this architecture. The Chettinad cuisine belongs to the region. There is a temple dedicated to Tamil Thai (Tamil Mother), which opened in 1993. There are mandapas dedicated to poets Kamban and Kannadasan.

Siravayal manjuvirattu, a type of jallikattu bull taming festival is held during the annual Pongal festivities at Siravayal, near Karaikudi. Prominent temples in the region include Koppudaiya Amman temple, Ariyakudi Thiruvenkatamudayan temple, Pillayarpatti Karpagavinayagar temple, Kundrakudi Shanmughanathar temple, and Mathur Ainootreeswarar temple.

== Economy ==
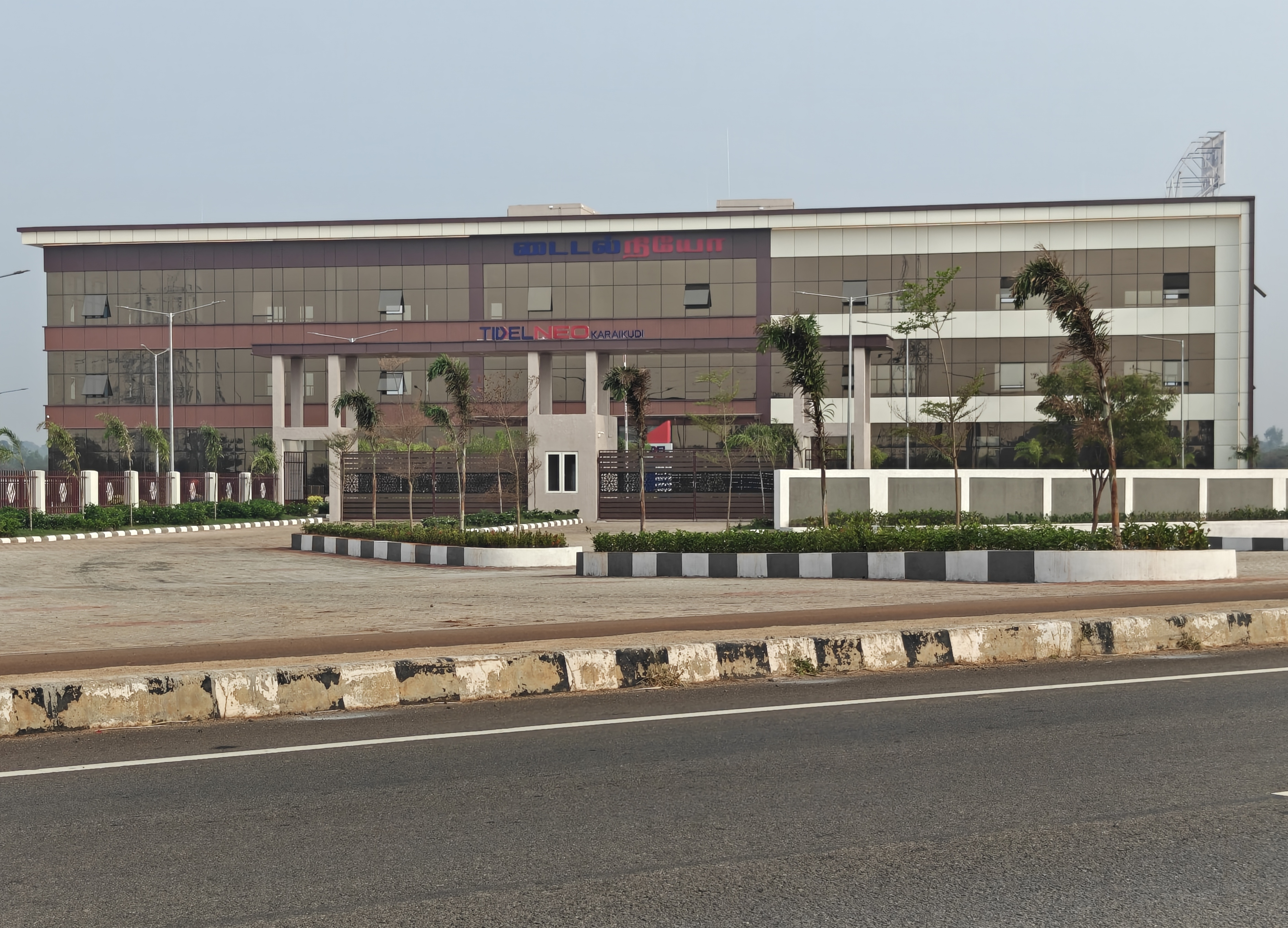
TIDEL Park at Karaikudi

Karaikudi is the economic center of the Chettinad region. The Nagarathar community of the region, who were involved in commerce, banking and money lending, led to the economic growth of the region in the second half of 19th and early 20th century. Heritage tourism has been developed in the 21st century. Indian Overseas Bank was founded by M. Ct. M. Chidambaram Chettiar in 1937, and opened one of its first three branches in Karaikudi. Major industries in the region include chemicals, engineering, leather, and powerloom. Agriculture is a significant contributor, with rice being the major crop, and other crops that are grown include millets, cereals, pulses, sugarcane, and groundnut.

Athangudi tiles are cement tiles used in the construction of palatial houses in the town and is a major handicraft industry. Kandangi is a type of cotton sari woven in the Chettinad region, and is a recognised Geographical Indication (GI). Chettinad Kottan are palm leaf baskets woven by the women of the region, and are noted for its unique style and colors. It was granted a GI tag in 2013. Aavin operates a dairy and milk processing facility in Karaikudi, with a capacity of 50,000 liters per day. In February 2026, TIDEL Park, an Information Technology Special Economic Zone was established in Kalanivasal near Karaikudi.

== Infrastructure ==
Water supply is provided by the municipal corporation with water drawn from several borewells. In 2011, about 45 metric tonnes of solid waste was collected by the local body. There was about 46.55 km (28.92 mi) of storm water drains in 2011. The roads and street lights are maintained by the local body. Electricity supply to Karaikudi is regulated and distributed by the Tamil Nadu Electricity Board. The local administration operates a daily market and three farmer markets. There is a government hospital and 13 private hospitals in the town.

== Transport ==
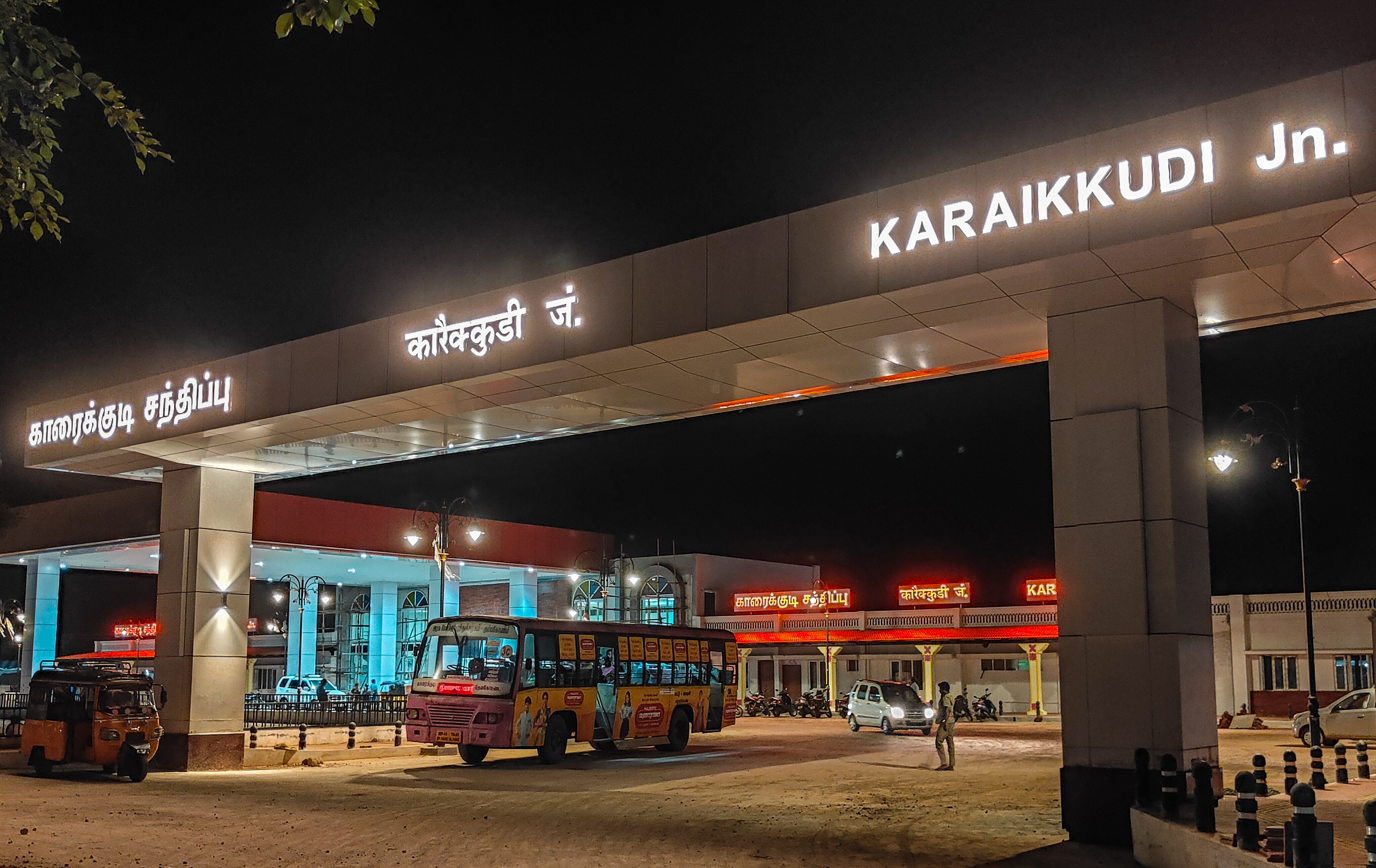
Karaikudi Junction

Karaikudi is served by the Karaikudi Junction of the Indian Railways. It is located on the broad gauge line connecting Chennai Egmore and Rameswaram.

There are two bus stands–Rajaji bus stand in the north west part of the town, and a new bus stand on the eastern side. Tamil Nadu State Transport Corporation operates inter-city bus services to major towns across Tamil Nadu. Private bus operators run moffusil buses to select cities such as Bengaluru, Chennai, Coimbatore, and Tiruppur.

There is an unused airstrip, which has not been in use since the 1950s. In 2016, the Government of India unveiled plans to reopen this airfield under the UDAN scheme. The nearest airports are Madurai Airport at Madurai, located about 86.6 km (53.8 mi) from the town, and Tiruchirapalli International Airport at Tiruchirapalli, located about 86.9 km (54.0 mi) away.

== Education ==
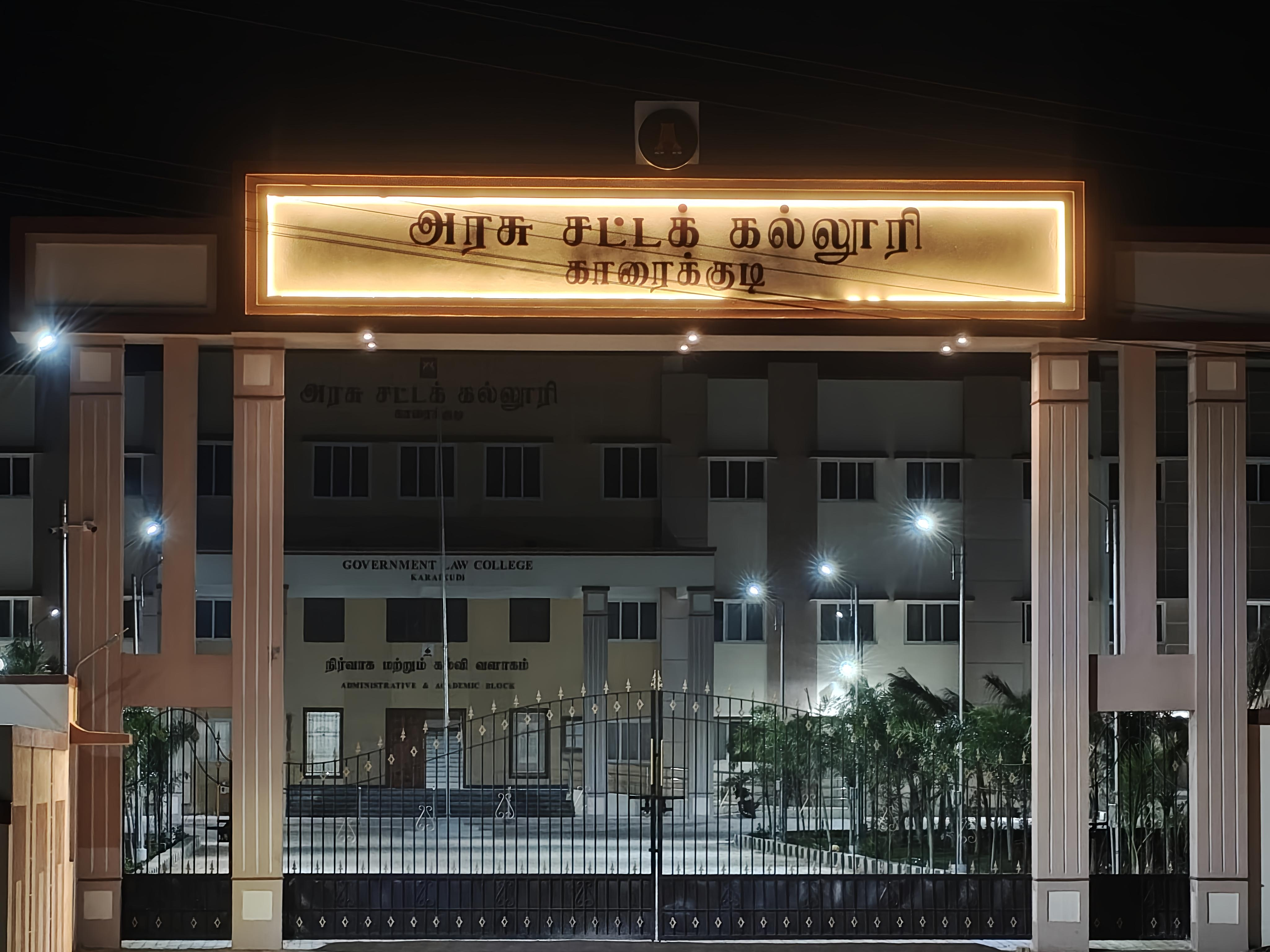
Government Law College, Karaikudi

Karaikudi serves as the headquarters of the Karaikudi Educational District. As of 2011, there were six government schools, six government-aided schools, and nine private schools.

There are three engineering colleges, six arts and science colleges, four teacher training colleges, three polytechnics, and a law college. There is a government operated Industrial Training Institute at Amaravathi near Karaikudi. The city is home to Alagappa University, and its affiliated colleges–Alagappa Chettiar College of Engineering and Technology, Alagappa Government Arts College and Alagappa Polytechnic College.

The Central Electrochemical Research Institute was established by the Government of India on 25 July 1948. It operates various research centers, and is involved in petrochemical and marine research.
