= Muthiah (name) =

Muthiah often refers to Sri Lankan cricketer Muttiah Muralitharan (also called Muthiah).

Muthiah is also a given name, surname and middle name. Notable people with the name include:

== As a surname ==
- M. A. M. Muthiah
- A. C. Muthiah
- M. Ct. Muthiah
- Sedapatti R. Muthiah
- Sedapatti R. Muthiah
- S. Muthiah
- P. G. Muthiah
- M. Muthiah
- Satappa Ramanatha Muthiah family

== As a given name ==
- Muthiah Annamalai Muthiah Ramaswamy
- S. Muthiah (politician)
- Muthiah Bhagavatar
- Muthiah Annamalai Chidambaram
- Muthiah Sthapati
- Muthiah Chidambaram Muthiah Chidambaram Chettiar

== As a middle name ==
- M. A. Muthiah Chettiar
- Satappa Ramanatha Muthiah Annamalai Chettiar
- Satappa Ramanatha Muthiah Ramaswami Chettiar
- C. Muthiah Pillai
- S. Muthiah Mudaliar
- M. Ct. Muthiah Chettiar
- S. Rm. Muthiah Chettiar

== See also ==
- Rajah Muthiah Medical College
- Roja Muthiah Research Library
