= S. Rm. M. family =

Indian family in Tamil Nadu

The S. Rm. family is an Indian family of businessmen, industrialists and bankers from the town of Kanadukathan in the Sivaganga district of Tamil Nadu, India. The family is named after its ancestor, the popular 19th-century Nagarathar banker S. Rm. Muthiah Chettiar. The head of the family holds the honorific title Raja of Chettinad. The M. Ct. family has descended from one branch of the S. Rm. family.

Annamalai Chettiar is the maternal grandfather of India's former finance minister P. Chidambaram.

== First generation ==
- S. Rm. Muthiah Chettiar

== Second generation ==
- S. Rm. M. Chidambaram Chettiar, eldest son of S. Rm. Muthiah Chettiar and progenitor of the M. Ct. family.
- S. Rm. M. Ramaswami Chettiar (1872-1918), second son of S. Rm. Muthiah Chettiar. Founder of Indian Bank. Member of the Madras Legislative Council (1909–12)
- S. Rm. M. Annamalai Chettiar (1881-1948), youngest son of S. Rm. Muthiah Chettiar. Noted philanthropist and founder of Annamalai University. Second Nattukkottai Chettiar to be knighted, first being his nephew Sir M. Ct. Muthiah Chettiar. First Raja of Chettinad.

== Third generation ==
- R. Ramanathan Chettiar (1913-1995), son of S. Rm. Ramaswami Chettiar. Mayor of Madras (1951–52).
- M. A. Muthiah Chettiar (1905-1980), politician, philanthropist and oldest son of S. Rm. Annamalai Chettiar. Politician of the Justice Party and provincial minister in the Madras Presidency (1936–37). First mayor of Madras city (1934–35) and founder of the Tamil Isai Movement. Kumarrajah (heir-apparent) (1929–48) and Raja (1948–84) of Chettinad.
- M. A. Chidambaram (1918-2000), youngest son of S. Rm. Annamalai Chettiar. Industrialist and bureaucrat. Founder of Southern Petrochemical Industries Corporation (SPIC) and President of the Board of Control for Cricket in India (BCCI) (1961–62). M. A. Chidambaram Stadium is named after him.
- Lakshmi Achi (), daughter of S. Rm. Annamalai Chettiar and mother of P. Chidambaram.

== Fourth generation ==
- M. A. M. Muthiah (1929-1970), eldest son of M. A. Muthiah Chettiar. Industrialist.
- M. A. M. Ramaswamy, (1931-2015) second son of M. A. Muthiah Chettiar. Politician and industrialist. Member of the Rajya Sabha.
- A. C. Muthiah (b. 1940), son of M. A. Chidambaram. Industrialist and bureaucrat. President of the BCCI (1999-2001)
- P. Chidambaram (b. 1944), son of Palaniappa Chettiar and Lakshmi Achi. Finance Minister and Home Minister(2004-2014)

== Family Tree ==
S. Rm. Muthiah Chettiar
S. Rm. M. Chidambaram Chettiar	S. Rm. M. Ramaswami Chettiar	S. Rm. M. Annamalai Chettiar
M. Ct. Muthiah Chettiar	M. Ct. Pethachi Chettiar	R. Ramanathan Chettiar	M. A. Muthiah Chettiar	M. A. Ramanathan Chettiar	M. A. Chidambaram	Lakshmi Achi
M. Ct. M. Chidambaram Chettiar	M. Ct. P. Chidambaram	M. A. M. Muthiah	M. A. M. Ramaswamy	A. C. Muthiah	P. Chidambaram
M. Ct. Muthiah	M. Ct. Pethachi	M. A. M. M. Annamalai	M. A. M. R. Muthiah	Ashwin Muthiah	Karti Chidambaram
