= S. Rm. M. Chidambaram Chettiar =

Indian landowner

Sathappa Ramanatha Muthiah Chidambaram Chettiar (Tamil: சாத்தப்ப இராமநாத முத்தையா சிதம்பரம் செட்டியார்) better known as S.RM.M.Chidambaram Chettiar was the eldest son of S. Rm. Muthiah Chettiar and the progenitor of the M. Ct. family. In 1897, he purchased the zamindari of Andipatti from the Madras government and became its zamindar.

== Family tree ==
S. Rm. Muthiah Chettiar
S. Rm. M. Chidambaram Chettiar	S. Rm. M. Ramaswami Chettiar	S. Rm. M. Annamalai Chettiar
M. Ct. Muthiah Chettiar	M. Ct. Pethachi Chettiar	R. Ramanathan Chettiar	M. A. Muthiah Chettiar	M. A. Ramanathan Chettiar	M. A. Chidambaram	Lakshmi Achi
M. Ct. M. Chidambaram Chettiar	M. Ct. P. Chidambaram	M. A. M. Muthiah	M. A. M. Ramaswamy	A. C. Muthiah	P. Chidambaram
M. Ct. Muthiah	M. Ct. Pethachi	M. A. M. M. Annamalai	M. A. M. R. Muthiah	Ashwin Muthiah	Karti Chidambaram
