= S. Rm. Muthiah Chettiar =

Indian merchant, banker and philanthropist (1840-1900)

S. R. Muthiah Chettiar

Personal details
- Born: 1840 Kanadukathan, Madras Presidency
- Died: 1900 (aged 59–60)
- Occupation: Merchant, Banker, Philanthropist

Sathappa Ramanatha Muthiah Chettiar (1840-1900) was an Indian merchant, banker and philanthropist known for his work in renovating Saivite temples in India. He was the patriarch of the S. Rm. M. family.

== Early life ==
Muthiah Chettiar was born in Kanadukathan in about 1840 to Ramanathan Chettiar, an important leader of the Nagarathar community of Chettinad. Muthiah Chettiar had little education.

== Work ==
At an early age, Muthiah Chettiar entered the family profession of banking. He extended his activities to Ceylon, Burma and Malaya and made a huge fortune.

== Philanthropy ==
Muthiah Chettiar is remembered by most other member of the S. Rm. family for his philanthropical activities. He spent lakhs of rupees to renovate the Nataraja Temple at Chidambaram. He financed the construction and maintenance of the Arudra Dharsanam choultry in Chidambaram. He also constructed the Nagarathar choultry near the Dasaswamedha Ghat in Benares.

== Death ==
Muthiah Chettiar died in about 1900.

== Family Tree ==
S. Rm. Muthiah Chettiar
S. Rm. M. Chidambaram Chettiar	S. Rm. M. Ramaswami Chettiar	S. Rm. M. Annamalai Chettiar
M. Ct. Muthiah Chettiar	M. Ct. Pethachi Chettiar	R. Ramanathan Chettiar	M. A. Muthiah Chettiar	M. A. Ramanathan Chettiar	M. A. Chidambaram	Lakshmi Achi
M. Ct. M. Chidambaram Chettiar	M. Ct. P. Chidambaram	M. A. M. Muthiah	M. A. M. Ramaswamy	A. C. Muthiah	P. Chidambaram
M. Ct. Muthiah	M. Ct. Pethachi	M. A. M. M. Annamalai	M. A. M. R. Muthiah	Ashwin Muthiah	Karti Chidambaram
