= M. Ct. Pethachi Chettiar =

Indian administrator

Diwan Bahadur Muthiah Chidambaram Pethachi Chettiar
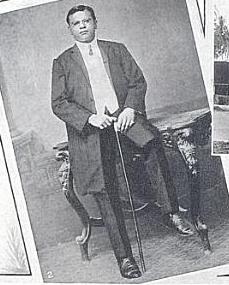

Personal details
- Born: 1889 Kanadukathan, Madras Presidency
- Died: 1924 (age 35) Madras
- Occupation: Landlord

Diwan Bahadur Muthiah Chidambaram Pethachi Chettiar (1889–1924) was an Indian administrator who served as the second zamindar of Andipatti, succeeding his father S. Rm. M. Chidambaram Chettiar.

== Early life and education ==
Muthiah Chettiar was born on 8 February 1887 to S. Rm. M. Chidambaram Chettiar, the second son of philanthropist Sattappa Ramanatha Muttaiya Chettiar. He was a nephew of Ramaswami Chettiar, founder of the Indian Bank and Sir Annamalai Chettiar, the first Raja of Chettinad and founder of the Annamalai University.
