= Chettinad Group =

Indian conglomerate

- Type: Private
- Industry: Conglomerate
- Founded: Chennai, Tamil Nadu; 1912; 114 years ago
- Founder: S. Rm. M. Annamalai Chettiar
- Headquarters: Anna Salai, Chennai, Tamil Nadu
- Key people: Dr. Muthiah Ramaswamy (Chairman)
- Products: Cement; Infrastructure; Logistics; Power generation Agriculture; Education
- Website: www.chettinad.com www.chettinadcement.com

Chettinad Group is an Indian business conglomerate headquartered in Chennai. It was founded as the Annaamalai Chettiar Group by Annamalai Chettiar.

== History ==
The Chettinad Group was founded in January 1912 by Raja Sir Annamalai Chettiar, who was part of the Nagarathar community in Tamil Nadu. In July 1962, the Chettinad Group expanded into the cement sector and launched Chettinad Cement.

In December 1984, after the death of M.A.Muthiah Chettiar, leadership passed to his son, M.A.M. Ramaswamy Chettiar, who became the group's head.

March 2011, Ennore Port (now Kamarajar Port) entered into a license agreement with Chettinad Group through a special purpose vehicle, Chettinad International Coal Terminal, for a build-operate-transfer (BOT) scheme.

From January 2012 to 2013 Chettinad Cement Corporation partnered with its associate company, Chettinad Power Corporation, to fund a thermal power project in Tamil Nadu. Chettinad Cement invested around ₹1,300 crore in equity.

In 2013 Chettinad Group partnered with private firms such as Breeze Enterprises, Mintra, Trans Earth Logistics, and Fossil Logistics, for logistics and coal movement.

After the death of Ramaswamy Chettiar, leadership passed to his adopted son M.A.M.R.Muthiah, who became the group's head in 2015.

In 2020 November JSW Infrastructure acquired Chettinad Group’s port assets.

== Controversies ==
In 2013, the Tamil Nadu Government took over the Annamalai University amidst allegations of financial and administrative mismanagement.

In August 2015, the Income Tax Department conducted extensive raids on properties linked to the Chettinad Group, reportedly uncovering unaccounted income of over ₹300 crore, which included large caches of cash and jewellery. These raids were part of a larger crackdown on alleged financial irregularities within the group.

=== Coal Handling Scam and Asset Attachment ===
In July 2024, the Enforcement Directorate provisionally attached immovable properties worth over ₹298 crore belonging to South India Corporation Pvt Ltd, a Chettinad Group company, under the Prevention of Money Laundering Act. This action stemmed from an investigation based on a Directorate of Vigilance and Anti-Corruption FIR against former officials of the Tamil Nadu Generation and Distribution Corporation and SICPL. The probe found that a coal handling contract originally awarded for five months in 2001 continued for 19 years following repeated court injunctions, reportedly resulting in a loss of approximately ₹908 crore to TANGEDCO and a corresponding gain to SICPL.
