= M. Ct. Muthiah Chettiar =

Indian banker

Sir Muthiah Chidambaram Muthiah Chettiar KCSI (8 February 1887 – 19 July 1929) better known as Sir M.CT.Muthiah Chettiar was an Indian Industrialist and Banker who served as a director of the Indian Bank. He was the oldest grandson of S.RM. Muthiah Chettiar, the patriarch of the M. Ct. and S. Rm. families.

== Early life and education ==
Muthiah Chettiar was born on 8 February 1887 to M. Chidambaram Chettiar, the eldest son of philanthropist Sattappa Ramanatha Muttaiya Chettiar. He was a nephew of Ramaswami Chettiar, founder of the Indian Bank and Sir Annamalai Chettiar, the first Raja of Chettinad and founder of the Annamalai University.

Muthiah Chettiar had his schooling at Maharajah's School, Pudukkottai and Pachaiyappa's High School, Chidambaram. He did his graduation in Pudukkottai. On graduating, Muthiah went on a tour of Europe. On returning from the tour, Muthiah went through a period of initial training in business management and then took over the family business. Muthiah also learnt economics from Gilbert Slater.

== Career ==
In 1912, Muthiah Chettiar migrated to the city of Madras. In 1914, he became a director of Indian Bank, which was primarily a creation of the S Rm family and served in the board till his death in 1929. He also served as President of the Southern Indian Chamber of Commerce.

Muthiah Chettiar was serving as the Sheriff of Madras during the visit of the then Prince of Wales George V to the city. He was also on the board of the Madras Port Trust for a short time. Muthiah also served as a member of the Madras Legislative Council and Imperial Legislative Council of India.

== Philanthropy ==
During the First World War, Muthiah Chettiar contributed more than Rs.70,000 to the British war effort. Muthiah Chettiar was made a Knight Bachelor in 1922 for his present of Rs. 50,000 to the Madras Tuberculosis Fund. He also served as a trustee of Pachaiyappa's Charities from 1919 till his death in 1929. The failing C. R. C. High School was purchased and financially strengthened by his son M. Ct. M. Chidambaram Chettyar who renamed it Sir M. Ct. Muthiah Chettiar High School.

== Death ==
Muthiah Chettiar died on 19 July 1929 at the age of 42.
