= K. Gopal =

K. Gopal may refer to:

- K. Gopal (INC politician), Indian politician
- K. Gopal (ADMK politician) (born 1959), Indian doctor and politician
