= Government Cuddalore Medical College =

Medical College in Tamil Nadu, India

- Former name: Rajah Muthiah Medical College
- Motto in English: In servitio debitum meum est.
- Type: Government Medical College
- Established: 1985; 41 years ago
- Academic affiliations: Tamil Nadu Dr. M.G.R. Medical University
- Dean: Dr. N. Basker
- Undergraduates: 150
- Location: Chidambaram, Tamil Nadu, 608002, India; 11°23′47.93″N 79°42′57.04″E
- Campus: 1,500 acres (610 ha); Urban
- Language: English

The Government Cuddalore Medical College, formerly Rajah Muthiah Medical College, is a public medical college located in Chidambaram, Cuddalore district, Tamil Nadu, India. It operates as a 1200-bed tertiary level center with a 24-hour emergency department and coronary care unit. It was established in 1985 under Annamalai University. Originally named after M. A. Muthiah Chettiar, the Raja of Chettinad, it was renamed in 2021 and reaffiliated to Tamil Nadu Dr. M.G.R. Medical University as it was handed over to the Health and Family Welfare department.

== History ==
Rajah Muthiah Institute of Health Sciences was established in the year 1980 with the opening of a dental college which inaugurated by Ramaswamy Venkataraman the President of India. Rajah Muthiah Medical College was established in 1985. In 1996, RMMC was the location of the murder of Pon Navarasu during a ragging incident, and led to the passing of the first anti-ragging legislation in India. In 2010, the Kalaignar Health Insurance Scheme for Life-Saving Treatments at RMMCH was instituted.

On 14 February 2020, during the presentation of the budget allocation for the Ministry of Health and Family Welfare as part of the 2020 Union budget of India, it was announced that the government will take over RMMC and turn it into a Government Medical College. This was affected by an order issued on 27 January 2021, the affiliating university was changed from Annamalai University to Tamil Nadu Dr. M.G.R. Medical University, and the institute was officially renamed Government Medical College and Hospital Cuddalore.

== Courses & Seats ==
MBBS: 150 seats annually, with quotas for 15% All India Quota and 85% State Quota admissions via NEET-UG counselling.

Postgraduate Programmes: Offers various MD/MS courses in multiple specialties.

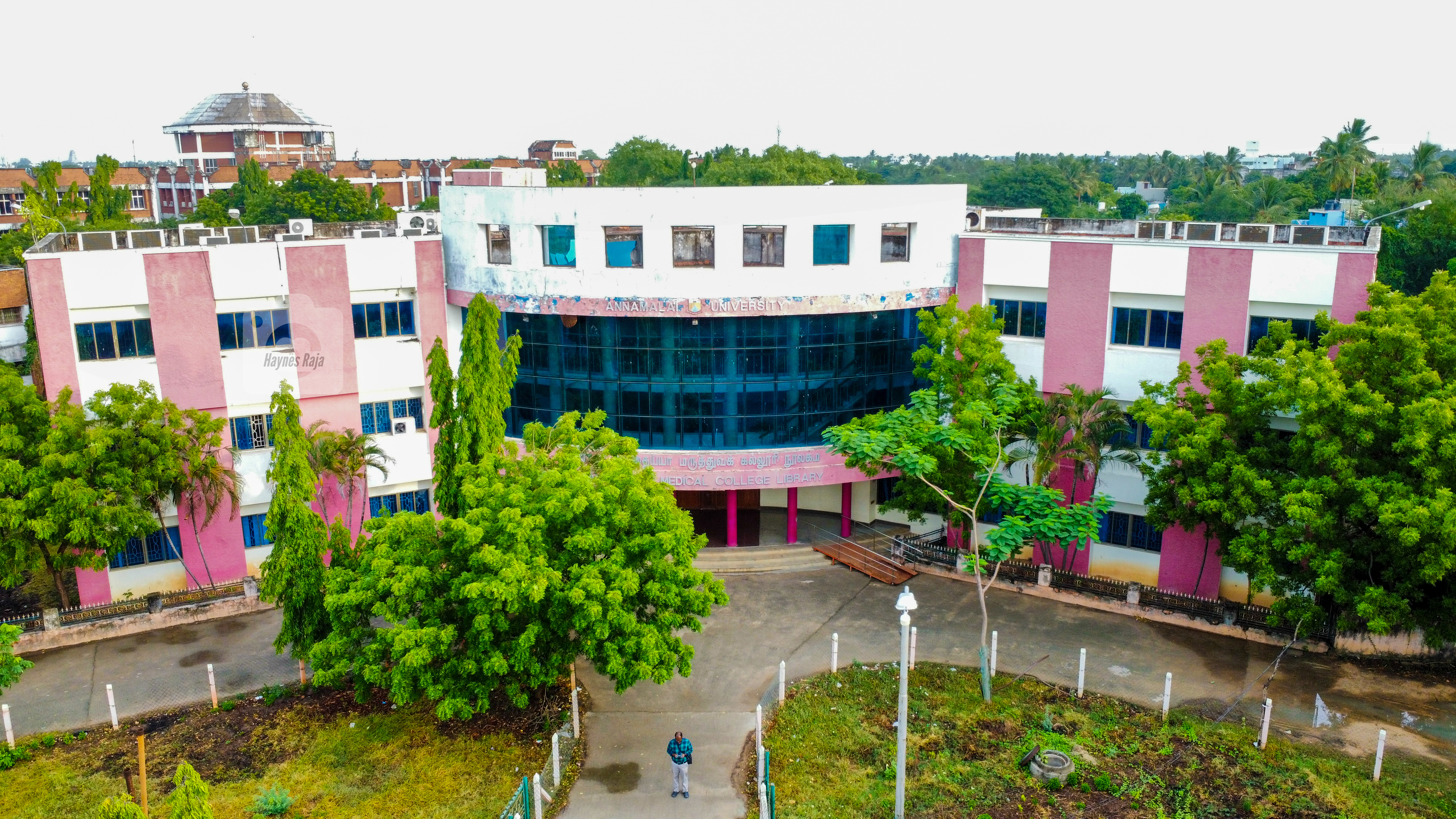
Rajah Muthiah Medical College Library front view

== Hospital & Facilities ==
Attached tertiary care hospital with over 1,200 beds, 24/7 emergency services, intensive care units, and multiple specialty departments.

Clinical exposure includes services like General Medicine, Surgery, Obstetrics & Gynaecology, Pediatrics, Orthopaedics, Radiology, Pathology, etc.

Facilities include modern laboratories, radiological imaging (CT, MRI, Doppler, X-ray), and teaching support infrastructure.

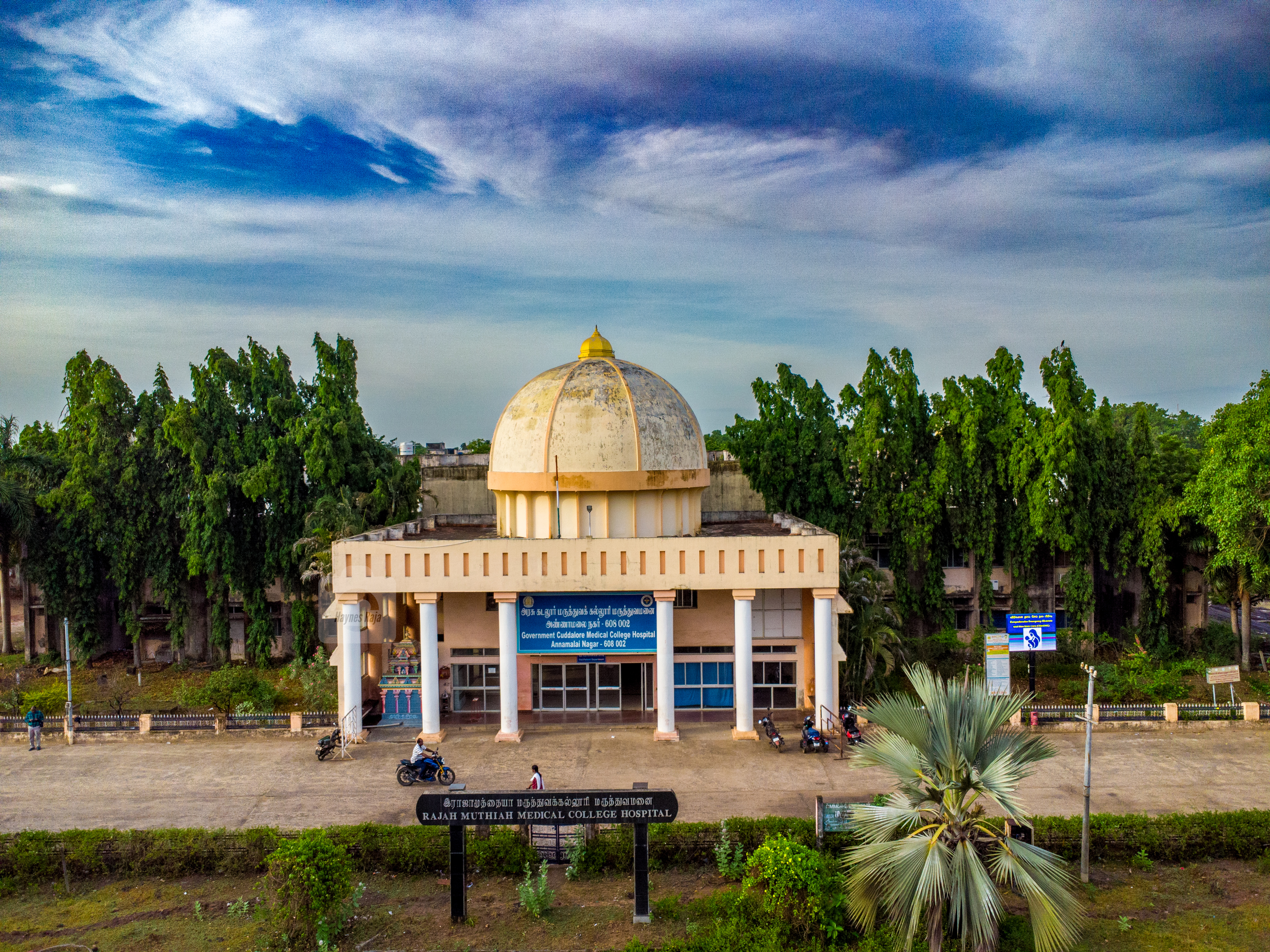
Outpatient clinic front view

== Notable alumni ==
- C. Vijayabaskar, Indian politician, Former Minister of Health and Family Welfare of Tamil Nadu

== Gallery ==
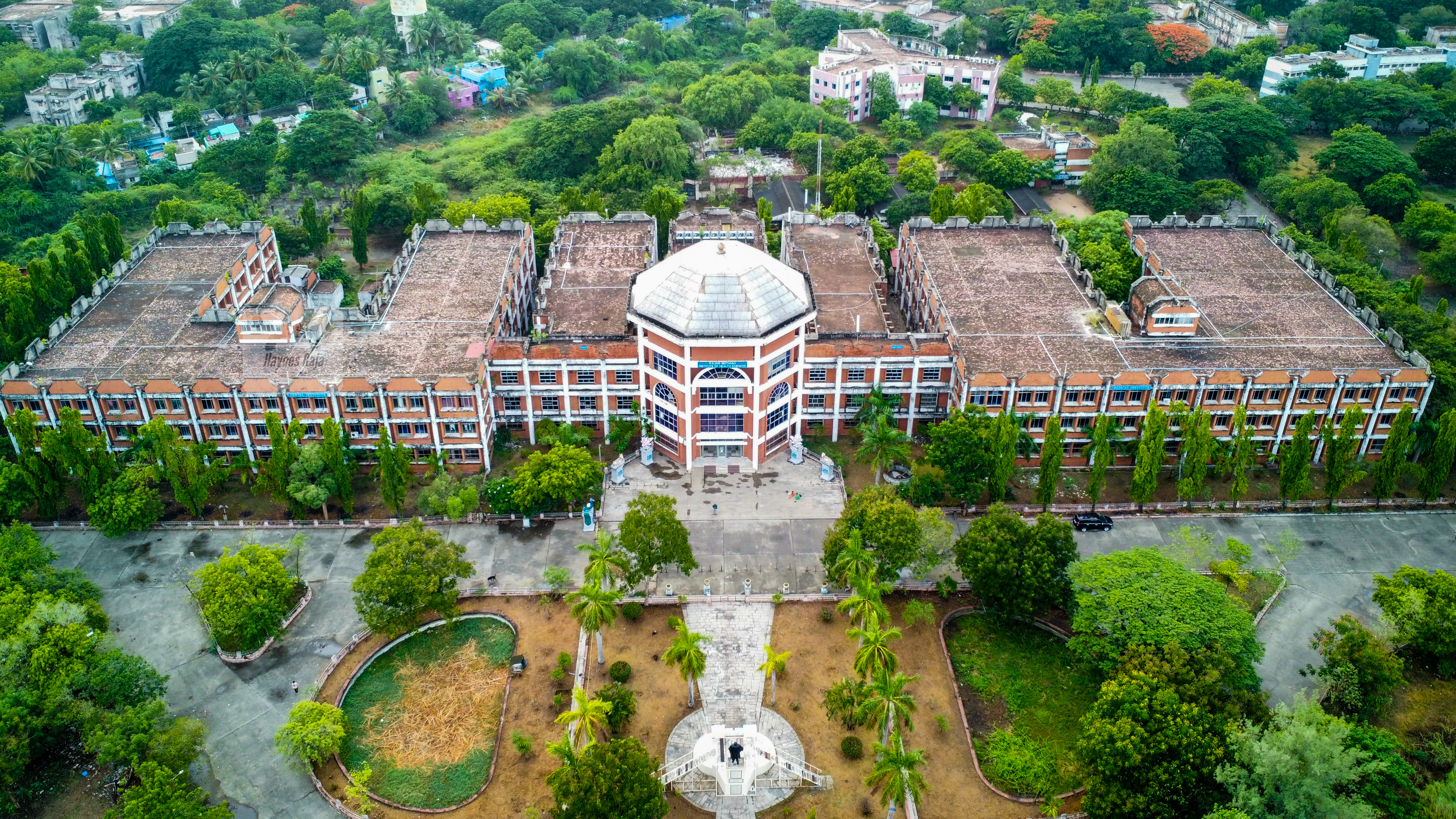
Rajah Muthiah medical college drone view

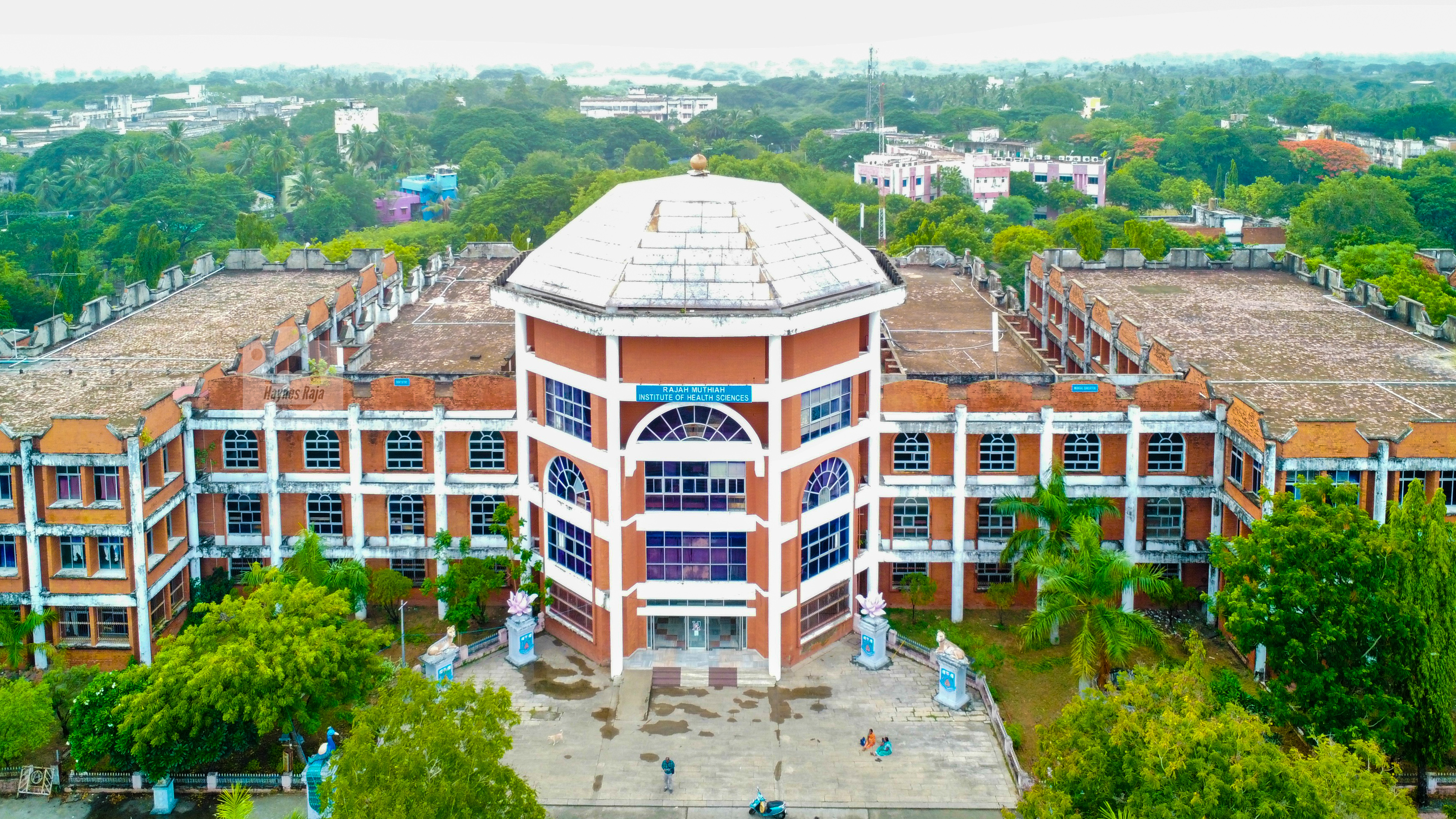
Rajah Muthiah Medical college Front image
