= Abdul Quddus =

Abdul Quddus (Arabic: عبد القدوس, romanized: ʻAbd al-Quddūs) is a male Muslim given name. It is built from the Arabic words Abd, al- and Quddus. The name means "Servant of the Holy One", Al-Quddus.

The letter a of the al- is unstressed, and can be transliterated by almost any vowel, often by u. The last element may appear as Quddous, Qudus or in other ways, with the whole name subject to variable spacing and hyphenation.

It may refer to:

- Abdul Quddus Gangohi (1456–1537), Indian Sufi poet
- Mohammed Abdul Kuddus Badsha Sahib (born 1865), Indian merchant
- Abd al-Quddus al-Ansari (1907–1983), Saudi Arabian historian, journalist and writer
- Ihsan Abdel Quddous (1919–1990), Egyptian writer, novelist, and journalist
- Mohammad Abdul Quddus Sardar (1946–2023), Bangladeshi state minister of Fisheries and Livestock
- Abdul Quddus Makhan (1947–1994), Bangladeshi freedom fighter and politician
- Abdul Quddus Bizenjo (born 1970), Pakistani politician
- Abdul Quddus Panchagarhi (born 1988), Bangladeshi politician
- Abdul Qudus, Afghan, former Guantanamo detainee (ISN 929)
- Isa Abdul-Quddus (born 1989), Detroit Lions safety
- Mohammad Abdul Quddus Kishoreganji, Bangladeshi freedom fighter and politician
