= M. Ct. M. Chidambaram Chettiar =

Indian industrialist

- Born: 2 August 1908; Kanadukathan, Madras Presidency, British India (present day Tamil Nadu, India)
- Died: 13 March 1954 (aged 45); Singapore
- Occupations: Banker; Industrialist
- Known for: Founding Indian Overseas Bank (IOB)
- Spouse: C. Valliammai Achi
- Children: 2

Muthiah Chidambaram Muthiah Chidambaram Chettiar (2 August 1908 – 13 March 1954) better known as M. Ct. M.Chidambaram was an Indian industrialist and banker who founded the Indian Overseas Bank. He was a member of the M. Ct. family.

== Early life and education ==
Chidambaram Chettiar was born at Kanadukathan on 2 August 1908. His father Sir M Ct. Muthiah Chettiar (1887-1929) was a banker who served as a member of the Imperial Legislative Council of India. Muthiah Chettiar was a nephew of Ramaswami Chettiar, founder of the Indian Bank and Sir Annamalai Chettiar, the Raja of Chettinad.

Chidambaram Chettiar had his early education at Madras Christian College High School but discontinued his education in the middle to pursue the family business of banking.

== Career ==
Chidambaram Chettiar succeeded his father as a director of the Indian Bank on the latter's death in 1929. Chidambaram Chettiar soon emerged as one of the top industrialists in the country. On 10 February 1937, he founded the Indian Overseas Bank, which concentrated on improving the country's industrial sector. The bank began business simultaneously from its branches at Karaikudi and Rangoon. Chidambaram Chettiar was also one of the founders of United India Assurance.

In 1944, with the assistance of Sir C. P. Ramaswami Iyer and British technical expertise, Chidambaram Chettiar founded the Travancore Rayons Limited, with a factory near Perumbavoor. The Travancore Rayons Limited was the first rayon manufacturing company in India. Chidambaram Chettiar also served as a director of Indian Bank from 1930 to 1940 and 1945 to 1949.

== Death ==
Chidambaram Chettiar died on 13 March 1954 when the British Overseas Airways flight Lockheed L-749A Constellation, G-ALAM on which he was travelling, crashed at Kallang Airport, Singapore, when it landed short and struck a sea wall after a flight from Jakarta, killing 33 people out of 40 passengers and crew on board.

== Family ==
Chidambaram Chettiar was married to Valliammai Achi. They had two sons - Muthiah Chettiar and Pethachi chettiar.
