= Kanadukathan Palace =

Palace in Kanadukathan, Tamil Nadu, India

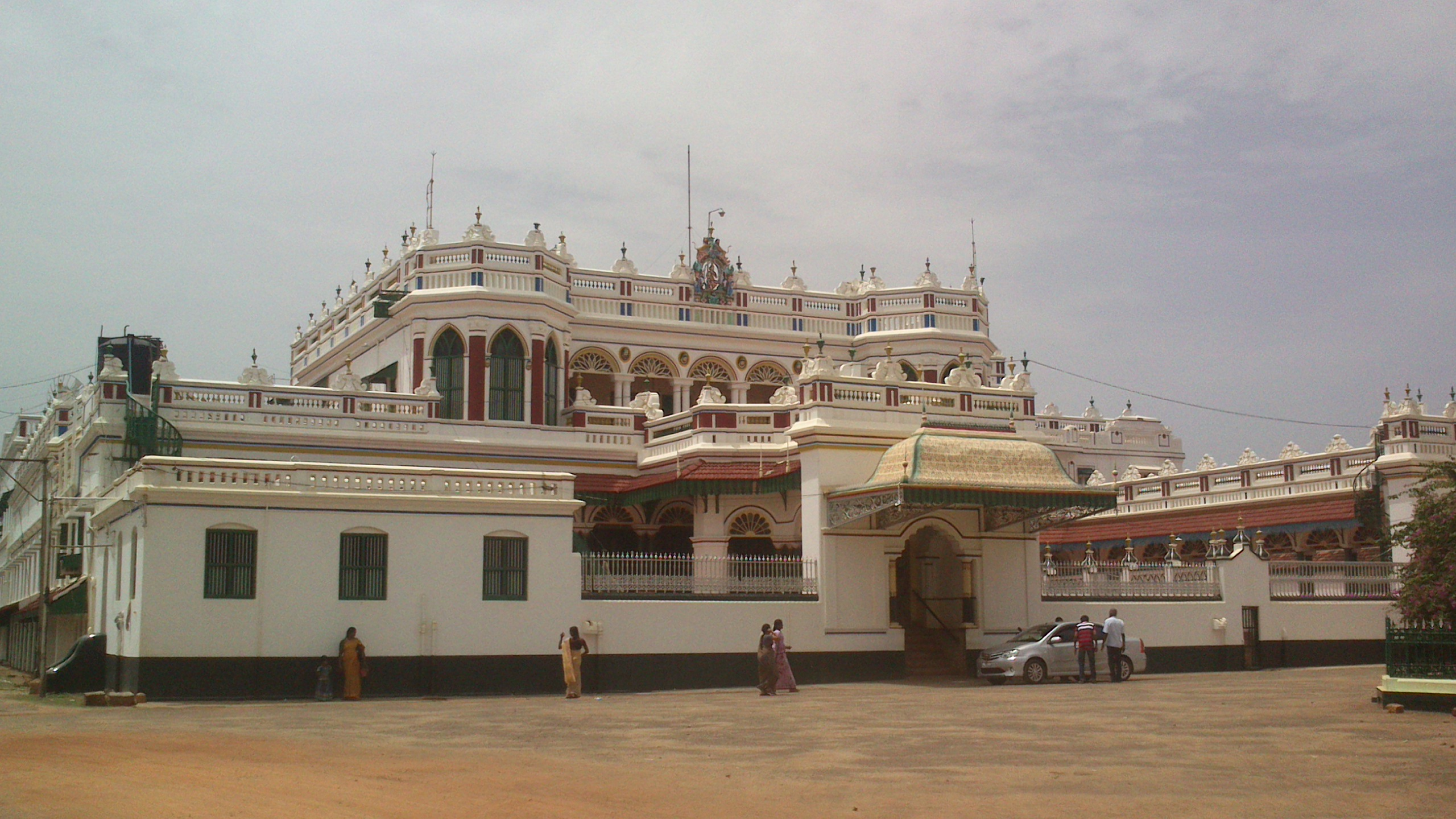
Kanadukathan Palace

Kanadukathan Palace is a palace situated in Kanadukathan in Sivaganga District, in Tamil Nadu, India.

== Location ==
Also known as "Chettinad Palace", Kanadukathan Palace is located at Karaikkudi taluk in Kanadukathan, at a distance of 60 km. from Sivaganga, 15 km. from Karaikkudi, 2 km. from Chettinad bus stand.

== Origin ==
This palace was built by Rajah Sir Annamalai Chettiar in 1912. With so many beautiful ornamental details it took seven years to complete the construction of the palace. This palace exposes the traditional Chettinad architecture.

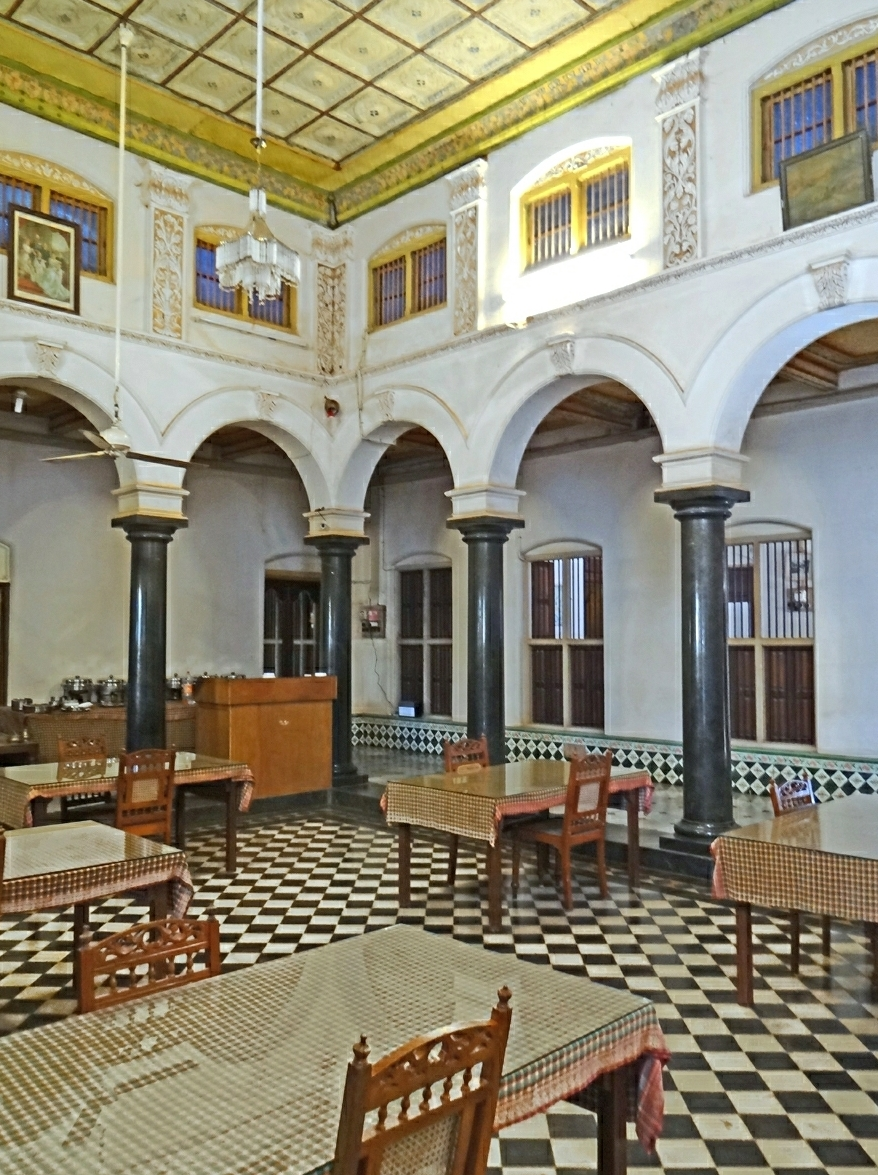
The interior

== Specialities ==
This palace is the composite of art, architecture and tradition. As an example, it exposes the cultural facets of Chettinadu people. The wishes of Chettiars are found elsewhere throughout the structure. Ornamental lights, teak wood materials, glasses, marbles, carpets and crystals were imported from overseas for the construction of the building. In spite of that it has different types of arts and styles in unique way. In Tamil Nadu, Chettinad houses are found in many places such as Karaikkudi, Pallatthur, Attangudi and Kothamangalam. These houses are like palaces having ornamental works throughout the building and wood works carried out from the wood which was imported, many of them from East Asian countries and Europe. Valuable teak wood, marbles and granite pillars are found. It has a vast porch. Many architects researched about the architectural pattern of this palace. At the entrance beautiful facade is found. On either side of the entrance vast pial, known as 'thinnai'. Beautiful pillars are also found there. The doors and the windows which are constructed with the teak wood imported from Burma showcases the beauty of the bungalow. Generally the main doors and entrances of the houses resemble the gateways of the Hindu temples. They are majestic and intricately carved. Potholes are covered with a wire mesh in the streets of Kanadukathan, for rainwater harvesting.

== Rituals ==
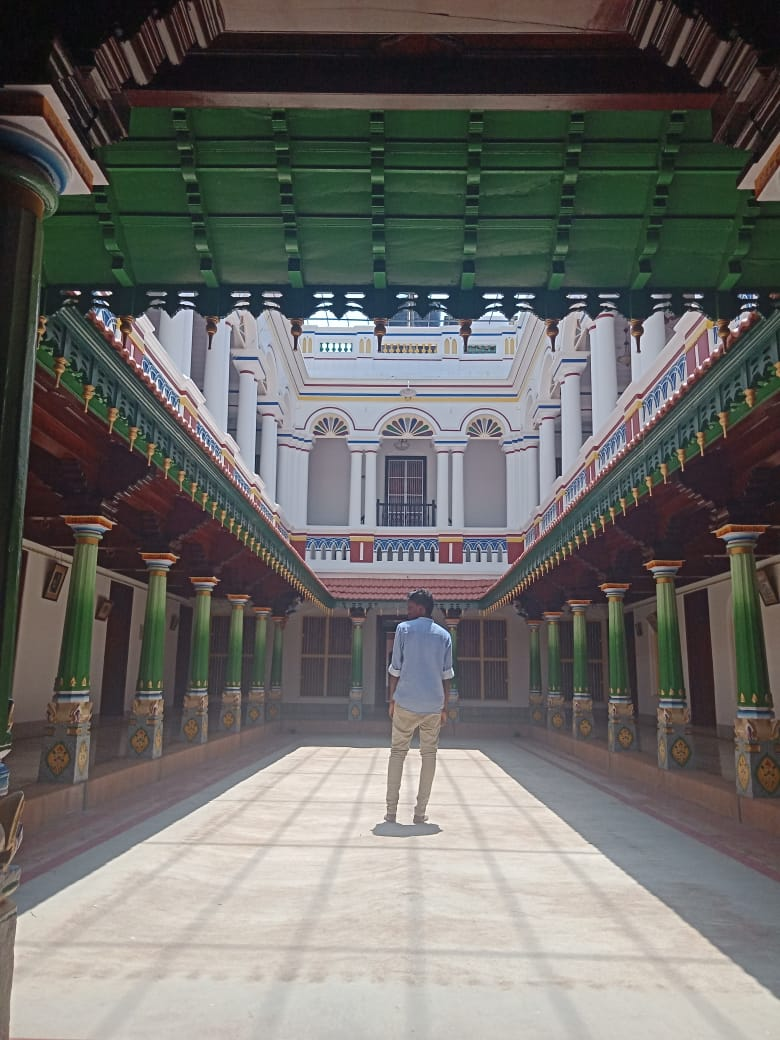
The courtyard

On the palace grounds there is a vast courtyard used for carrying out many functions such as marriage or religion oriented rituals. On one corner the puja room of the wife of Annamalai Chettiar, where she did puja for so many years is found. In this palace many valuable items and households used by the family are kept safe. Chettiars used to conduct many functions in their home itself. So, their houses would be like palace.

== Facility ==
This palace has a car shed, with 1990 sq.ft. Nine cars could be parked there. Lift is also available.
