= R. Ramanathan (INC politician) =

Indian businessman, politician and bureaucrat

Mayor R Ramanathan Chettiar

Member of Lok Sabha for Karur
- In office 1962–1967
- Prime Minister: Jawaharlal Nehru, Lal Bahadur Shastri, Indira Gandhi
- Preceded by: K. Periasami Gounder
- Succeeded by: C. Muthuswamy Gounder

Member of Lok Sabha for Pudukkottai
- In office 1957–1962
- Prime Minister: Jawaharlal Nehru
- Preceded by: K. M. Vallatharasu
- Succeeded by: R. Umanath

Mayor of Madras
- In office 1951–1952
- Preceded by: P. V. Cherian
- Succeeded by: C. H. Sibgatullah Saheb

Personal details
- Born: 30 September 1913 Madras, British India
- Died: 12 December 1995 (aged 82) Madras
- Party: Indian National Congress
- Profession: Businessman, politician

Ramaswami Ramanathan Chettiar (30 September 1913 – 12 December 1995) better known as Mayor Ramanathan Chettiar was an Indian Industrialist, politician and bureaucrat who served as Mayor of Madras and member of Lok Sabha.

== Early life ==
Ramanathan Chettiar was born to philanthropist Diwan Bahadur Ramaswami Chettiar on 30 September 1913. Ramaswami Chettiar was the elder brother of Annamalai Chettiar.

== Politics ==
Ramanathan Chettiar was a member of the Indian National Congress and played an active role in the Indian Independence Movement. He served as a councillor in the Corporation of Madras from 1948 to 1952. In 1949 he was selected Sheriff of Madras and in 1950 was elected Mayor of Madras, serving in both cases for a year.

In the 1957 Lok Sabha elections, Ramanathan Chettiar was elected to the Indian parliament from the Pudukkottai Lok Sabha constituency. He was again elected for the period 1962–1967, this time from the Karur constituency.

== Bureaucracy ==
Ramanathan Chettiar was the first director of the Reserve Bank of India. He also served as a member of the executive committee of the Federation of Indian Chambers of Commerce and as chairman of the Indian Handicrafts Development Corporation.

== Death ==
Ramanatha Chettiar died on 12 December 1995 at the age of 82. The Mayor Ramanathan Hall and M. R. C. Nagar in Raja Annamalaipuram, Chennai, are named after him.

== Notes ==
Preceded by P. V. Cherian	Mayor of Madras; 1950–1951	Succeeded by C. H. Sibgatullah Saheb
