= C. H. Sibghatullah =

Indian politician

C. H. Sibghatullah (4 November 1913 – 14 May 1985) was an Indian politician who served as mayor of Madras from 1951 to 1952. He was an alumnus of the Madras Christian College.

== Notes ==
Preceded by R. Ramanathan Chettiar	Mayor of Madras; 1951–1952	Succeeded by T. Chengalvorayan
