= Murder of Pon Navarasu =

1996 hazing death in India

Pon Navarasu, a student of Rajah Muthiah Medical College, Annamalai University in Chidambaram, Tamil Nadu, India was murdered on 6 November 1996. This murder, which occurred during a ragging incident, led to the passing of the first anti-ragging legislation in India.

== Details ==
Pon Navarasu was a first year student at the Rajah Muthiah Medical College, Annamalai University. He was murdered on 6th Nov 1996. His body was dismembered and the body parts were scattered in different parts of Tamil Nadu. They were recovered over the next few days. His father Professor P. K. Ponnusamy, former vice-chancellor of the Madras University, filed a police complaint on 10th Nov 1996. The next day John David, a senior student in the same college surrendered to judicial custody and confessed to the murder after a week-long interrogation. According to his confession, the murder took place while he was ragging Navarasu. The police said that David had assaulted Navarasu during a ragging session in his hostel room as the latter refused to strip and lick footwear. David's college mates testified that he had a reputation for being a bully and humiliating freshers. Delivering the much-awaited judgement in a packed court hall, a Cuddalore judge S.R. Singaravelu said the motive of the murder was probably, 'that while other juniors had obliged the accused, the disinclination of Navarasu, who happened to be the son of a vice-chancellor, might have irritated the accused and made him desperate and led to an ego clash.'

The gruesome nature of the murder caused a public outcry and the Tamil Nadu government passed an anti-ragging ordinance criminalising ragging. Later this ordinance was formalised as the Tamil Nadu Prohibition of Ragging Act, 1997. Thus Tamil Nadu became the first state in India to ban ragging in educational institutions and criminalise the act.

John David was convicted of Navarasu's murder and was given a double life sentence (to be served consecutively) by the Cuddalore district sessions court on 11 March 1998. The Madras High Court overturned the verdict on 5 October 2001 and acquitted him. The state of Tamil Nadu appealed to the Indian Supreme court. On 20 April 2011, the supreme court overturned the high court acquittal and confirmed the lower court's conviction. It also ordered the double life sentences to be served concurrently. John David, who had been released in 2001, turned himself in again a few days later and is currently serving his sentence.

Navarasu's parents have established a non-profit anti-ragging organisation in his memory.

== See also ==
- Hazing
