= M. A. Chidambaram =

Indian industrialist and cricket administrator (1918–2000)

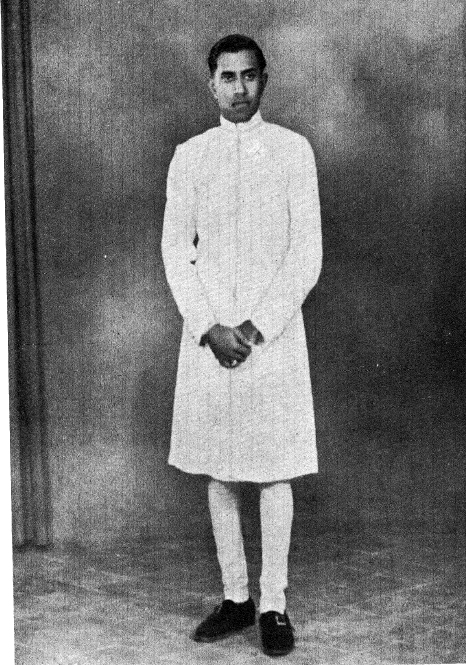
- Born: 12 October 1918; Kanadukathan, Madras Presidency, British India
- Died: 19 January 2000 (aged 81); Chennai, Tamil Nadu, India
- Spouse: Oppilal Chidambaram
- Children: A. C. Muthiah, Seetha
- Parent: S. Rm. M. Annamalai Chettiar (Father)

Muthiah Annamalai Chidambaram (12 October 1918 – 19 January 2000) was an Indian industrialist and cricket administrator. He was the youngest son of Raja Sir Annamalai Chettiar, Raja of Chettinad.

== Early life ==
Chidambaram was born at Kanadukathan on 12 October 1918, the third and youngest son of Annamalai Chettiar, the Raja of Chettinad. He was the younger brother of M. A. Muthiah Chettiar and M. A. Ramanathan Chettiar.

== Career ==
He started off with a scooter factory in Mumbai, Automobile Products of India in 1946 and later became the Director of the Indian Aluminium Company at a young age. He was instrumental in founding the Southern Petrochemical Industries Corporation (SPIC) and served as the chairman till his death. He was the Mayor of Madras in 1955.

He was the president of the Southern Indian Chamber of Commerce and Industry from 1951 to 1957.

Chidambaram became the Vice President of the Board of Control for Cricket in India (BCCI) in India in 1956, President from 1960–61 to 1962-63 and treasurer for about twenty years. He was the head of Tamil Nadu Cricket Association (TNCA) for 32 years. He was also the President of All India Lawn Tennis Association from 1963 to 1966.

He played a significant role in the negotiations between the TNCA and the Madras Cricket Club over the construction of a stadium on the club's ground in Chepauk. Completed in 1980, this stadium was later named M. A. Chidambaram Stadium in his honour. He was also an honorary life member of MCC, the Marylebone Cricket Club.

Besides being a pioneering industrialist, MAC is also remembered for his contribution to several other fields. He started the Tamil Isai Sangam to promote music in Tamil. His trust contributed substantially to the Voluntary Health Service started by Dr K. Sanjeevi.

== Family ==
Chidambaram has a son A. C. Muthiah and a daughter Seetha. His nephew is the former Finance Minister of India P. Chidambaram.

== Legacy ==
The M. A. Chidambaram Stadium in Chepauk, Chennai (formerly the Madras Cricket Club Stadium) is named after M. A. Chidambaram.
