= Arbuthnot Bank crash =

Fall of Arbuthnot & Co

The Arbuthnot Bank crash led to the fall of Arbuthnot & Co, a premier British-owned financial institution in Madras Presidency, British India in October 1906. The incident is considered to be one of the key events which influenced the Indian independence movement in Tamil Nadu.

In the last quarter of 1906, Madras (now Chennai) was hit by the worst financial crisis the city was ever to suffer. Of the three best-known British commercial names in 19th-century Madras, one crashed, a second had to be resurrected by a distress sale, and the third had to be bailed out by a benevolent benefactor.

Macfadyen, one of the partners, engaged in speculation, in the process losing huge amounts of the firm's money. Prior to its collapse, Arbuthnots employed between 11,000 and 12,000 people, had 7,000 creditors and £1,000,000 in liabilities. Macfadyen's liabilities were £400,000, and there were 1,000 creditors. The English trustee in bankruptcy and the official assignee in Madras agreed that the assets of the two insolvent firms were to be treated as one and the same business, and all creditors were to be entitled to share rateably in the pooled assets.

Both Macfadyen and Arbuthnot were consistently over-optimistic concerning their speculations, and both firms had to close their doors. Macfadyen killed himself in 1906. Arbuthnot was tried for the fraudulent activities the collapse revealed, and received a sentence of "18 months rigorous imprisonment".

The depositors approached eminent lawyer V. Krishnaswami Iyer, who fought Arbuthnot Bank on their behalf and obtained a compensation for them. Later, he was one of the founder-directors of Indian Bank, which was founded upon the ruins of Arbuthnot Bank.
