= Karur Lok Sabha constituency =

Parliamentary constituency in Tamil Nadu, India

Coordinates: 10.95°N 78.08°E

Karur
- Lok Sabha constituency
- Interactive map of Karur Loksabha constituency, post-2008 delimitation

Constituency details
- Country: India
- Region: South India
- State: Tamil Nadu
- Assembly constituencies: Vedasandur; Aravakurichi; Karur; Krishnarayapuram; Manapparai; Viralimalai
- Established: 1957
- Total electors: 1,386,636
- Reservation: None

Member of Parliament
- 18th Lok Sabha
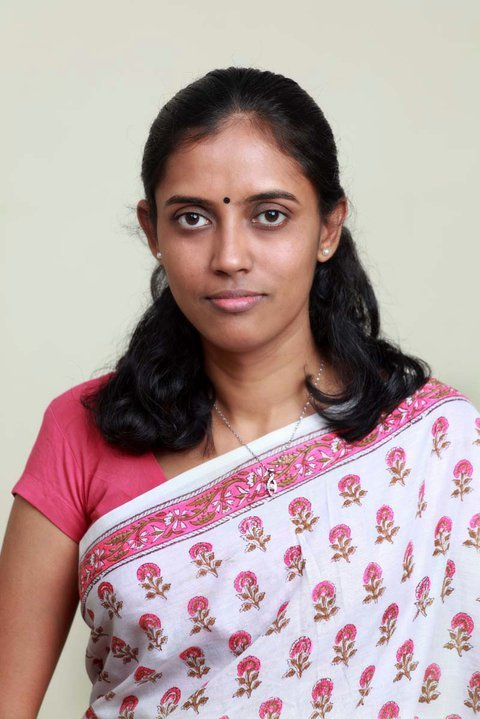
- Incumbent S. Jothimani
- Party: INC
- Elected year: 2019 Election

Karur is a Lok Sabha (Parliament of India) constituency in Tamil Nadu. Its Tamil Nadu Parliamentary Constituency number is 23 of 39.

== Assembly segments ==
=== From 2009 ===
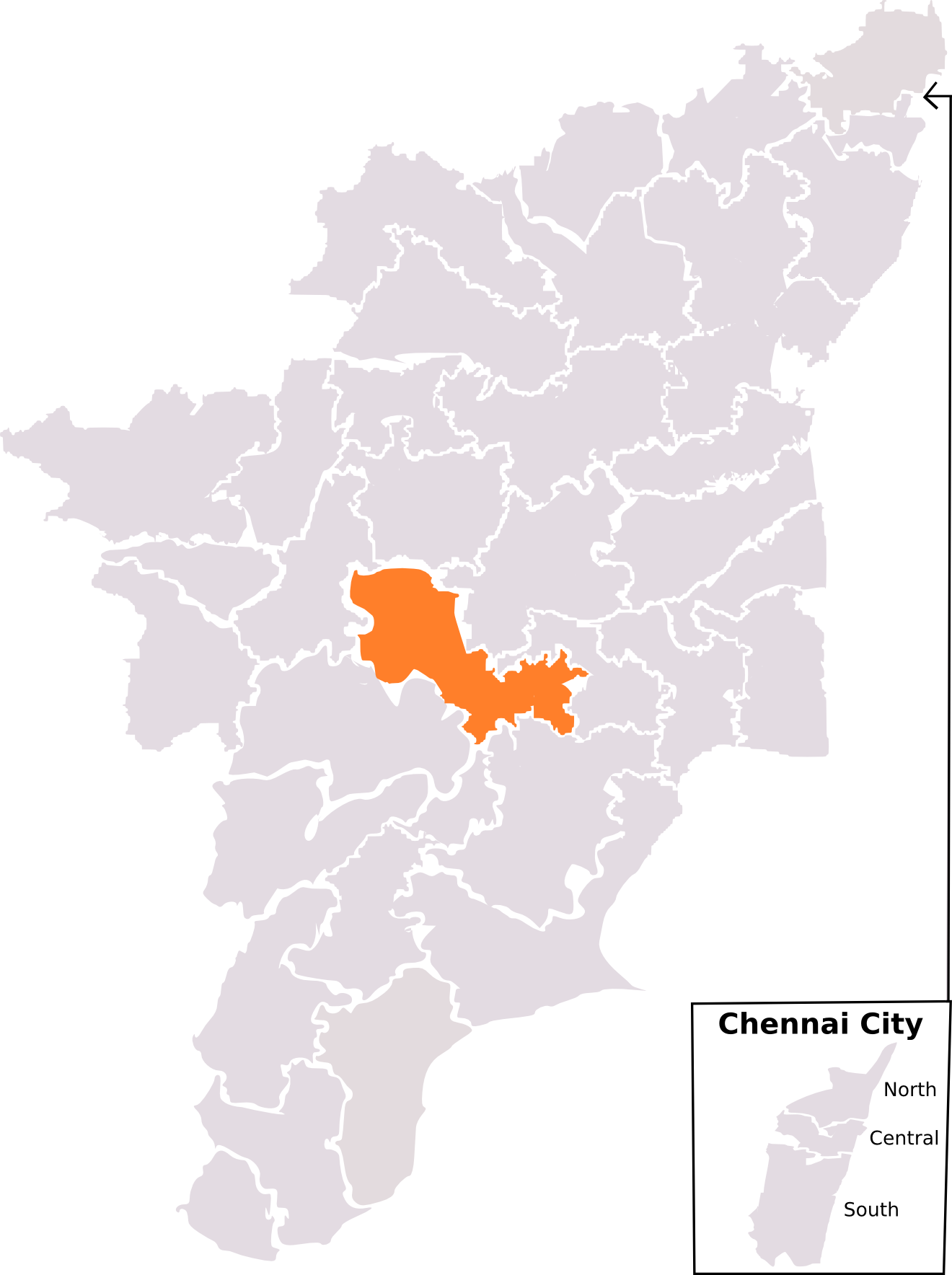
Karur constituency as laid out by 2008 Delimitation

Karur Lok Sabha constituency is composed of the following assembly segments:

Constituency number	Name	Reserved for (SC/ST/None)	District	Party	2024 Lead
133	Vedasandur	None	Dindigul	DMK	INC
134	Aravakurichi	None	Karur	DMK	INC
135	Karur	None	Karur	Vacant	INC
136	Krishnarayapuram	SC	Karur	TVK	INC
138	Manapparai	None	Tiruchirappalli	TVK	INC
179	Viralimalai	None	Pudukkottai	Vacant	INC

=== Before 2009 ===
1. Aravakurichi
2. Karur
3. Krishnarayapuram (SC)
4. Marungapuri (defunct)
5. Kuliththalai (moved to Perambalur)
6. Thottiyam (defunct)

== Members of Parliament ==
Year	Winning Candidate	Party
1957	K. Periyasamy Gounder	Indian National Congress
1962	R. Ramanathan Chettiar	Indian National Congress
1967	C. Muthuswamy Gounder	Swatantra Party
1971	K. Gopal	Indian National Congress
1977	K. Gopal	Indian National Congress
1980	A. R. Murugaiah	Indian National Congress
1984	A. R. Murugaiah	Indian National Congress
1989	M. Thambidurai	All India Anna Dravida Munnetra Kazhagam
1991	N. Murugesan	All India Anna Dravida Munnetra Kazhagam
1996	K. Natrayan	Tamil Maanila Congress
1998	M. Thambidurai	All India Anna Dravida Munnetra Kazhagam
1999	M. Chinnasamy	All India Anna Dravida Munnetra Kazhagam
2004	K. C. Palanisamy	Dravida Munnetra Kazhagam
2009	M. Thambidurai	All India Anna Dravida Munnetra Kazhagam
2014	M. Thambidurai	All India Anna Dravida Munnetra Kazhagam
2019	S. Jothimani	Indian National Congress
2024	S. Jothimani	Indian National Congress

== Election results ==
Vote share of Winning candidates
2024	47.25%
2019	63.36%
2014	52.36%
2009	46.21%
2004	60.57%
1999	46.46%
1998	50.39%
1996	56.12%
1991	68.89%
1989	65.60%
1984	68.36%
1980	55.48%
1977	62.26%
1971	59.09%
1967	53.00%
1962	48.59%
1957	50.90%

=== General Elections 2024 ===
2024 Indian general election: Karur
Party	Candidate	Votes	%	±%
INC	S. Jothimani	534,906	47.25	▼16.11
AIADMK	K. R. L. Thangavel	368,090	32.52	▲7.46
BJP	V. V. Sentilnathan	102,482	9.05	New
NOTA	None of the above	8,275	0.73	▼0.14
IND	46 Independent Candidates	26,035	2.30	
OTH	4 Other Party Candidates	4,754	0.42	
Margin of victory		166,816	14.74	▼23.56
Turnout		1,132,045		
INC hold		Swing		

=== General Elections 2019 ===
2019 Indian general election: Karur
Party	Candidate	Votes	%	±%
INC	S. Jothimani	695,697	63.36	60.41
AIADMK	M. Thambidurai	275,151	25.06	−27.30
Independent	P. S. N. Thangavel	31,139	2.84	
MNM	Dr. R. Hariharan	15,967	1.45	
NOTA	None of the above	9,603	0.87	−0.46
Margin of victory		420,546	38.30	19.40
Turnout		1,097,947	79.55	−0.40
Registered electors		1,387,286		6.85
INC gain from AIADMK		Swing	11.01	

=== General Elections 2014 ===
2014 Indian general election: Karur
Party	Candidate	Votes	%	±%
AIADMK	M. Thambidurai	540,722	52.36	6.14
DMK	M. Chinnasamy	345,475	33.45	−7.02
DMDK	N. S. Krishnan	76,560	7.41	1.20
INC	S. Jothimani	30,459	2.95	
NOTA	None of the above	13,763	1.33	
BSP	V. Maruthaiveeran	5,694	0.55	−0.11
Margin of victory		195,247	18.91	13.17
Turnout		1,032,771	80.65	−1.74
Registered electors		1,298,322		28.18
AIADMK hold		Swing	6.14	

=== General Elections 2009 ===
2009 Indian general election: Karur
Party	Candidate	Votes	%	±%
AIADMK	M. Thambidurai	380,542	46.21	11.31
DMK	K. C. Palanisamy	333,288	40.48	−20.10
DMDK	R. Ramanathan	51,196	6.22	
KNMK	R. Natarajan	14,269	1.73	
Independent	K. Shankar	6,519	0.79	
Independent	T. Karventhan	5,553	0.67	
BSP	R. Dharmalingam	5,413	0.66	
Margin of victory		47,254	5.74	−19.93
Turnout		823,421	81.43	11.76
Registered electors		1,012,924		−5.28
AIADMK gain from DMK		Swing	-14.36	

=== General Elections 2004 ===
2004 Indian general election: Karur
Party	Candidate	Votes	%	±%
DMK	K. C. Palanisamy	450,407	60.57	14.50
AIADMK	Raja N. Palanichamy	259,531	34.90	−11.56
Independent	N. Jawahar	14,552	1.96	
JP	H. Nagarajan	5,672	0.76	
Independent	C. Rathinasamy	5,578	0.75	
Margin of victory		190,876	25.67	25.27
Turnout		743,592	69.70	6.60
Registered electors		1,069,359		−8.65
DMK gain from AIADMK		Swing	14.11	

=== General Elections 1999 ===
1999 Indian general election: Karur
Party	Candidate	Votes	%	±%
AIADMK	M. Chinnasamy	334,407	46.46	13.39
DMK	K. C. Palanisamy	331,560	46.07	
TMC(M)	K. Natrayan	45,539	6.33	
Independent	K. Sathiyamoorthy	4,970	0.69	
Margin of victory		2,847	0.40	−6.32
Turnout		719,705	62.94	−8.27
Registered electors		1,170,582		3.56
AIADMK hold		Swing	-9.65	

=== General Elections 1998 ===
1998 Indian general election: Karur
Party	Candidate	Votes	%	±%
AIADMK	M. Thambidurai	327,480	50.39	
TMC(M)	K. Natrayan	283,807	43.67	
INC	K. P. Shanmuga Sundram	30,157	4.64	
PT	S. Kamaraj	5,449	0.84	
Margin of victory		43,673	6.72	−16.32
Turnout		649,880	59.84	−11.36
Registered electors		1,130,361		5.35
AIADMK gain from TMC(M)		Swing	-5.73	

=== General Elections 1996 ===
1996 Indian general election: Karur
Party	Candidate	Votes	%	±%
TMC(M)	K. Natrayan	409,830	56.12	
AIADMK	M. Thambidurai	241,556	33.08	−35.82
MDMK	T. P. Moorthy	61,188	8.38	
BJP	R. K. Madhukumar	5,870	0.80	
Independent	S. Arokkiam	4,338	0.59	
Margin of victory		168,274	23.04	−16.07
Turnout		730,328	71.20	3.63
Registered electors		1,072,924		2.82
TMC(M) gain from AIADMK		Swing	-12.78	

=== General Elections 1991 ===
1991 Indian general election: Karur
Party	Candidate	Votes	%	±%
AIADMK	N. Murugesan	475,571	68.89	3.30
DMK	D. Thirunavukkarasu	205,602	29.78	−3.49
PMK	R. Pakkian	4,388	0.64	
Margin of victory		269,969	39.11	6.78
Turnout		690,318	67.57	−3.64
Registered electors		1,043,464		−0.70
AIADMK hold		Swing	3.30	

=== General Elections 1989 ===
1989 Indian general election: Karur
Party	Candidate	Votes	%	±%
AIADMK	M. Thambidurai	484,492	65.60	
DMK	K. C. Palanisamy	245,741	33.27	3.85
PMK	M. Sakthivel	3,679	0.50	
Margin of victory		238,751	32.32	−6.62
Turnout		738,596	71.21	−6.05
Registered electors		1,050,778		28.46
AIADMK gain from INC		Swing	-2.76	

=== General Elections 1984 ===
1984 Indian general election: Karur
Party	Candidate	Votes	%	±%
INC	A. R. Murugaiah	413,533	68.36	
DMK	M. Kandaswamy	177,970	29.42	
Independent	R. Krishnan	13,426	2.22	
Margin of victory		235,563	38.94	24.31
Turnout		604,929	77.25	9.82
Registered electors		817,972		7.21
INC gain from INC(I)		Swing	12.88	

=== General Elections 1980 ===
1980 Indian general election: Karur
Party	Candidate	Votes	%	±%
INC(I)	S. A. Dorai Sebastian	281,149	55.48	
AIADMK	K. Kanagaraj	207,015	40.85	
JP(S)	P. M. Elamaran	11,215	2.21	
Independent	M. Apparavo	5,250	1.04	
Margin of victory		74,134	14.63	−14.11
Turnout		506,788	67.44	−3.23
Registered electors		762,973		4.11
INC(I) gain from INC		Swing	-6.78	

=== General Elections 1977 ===
1977 Indian general election: Karur
Party	Candidate	Votes	%	±%
INC	K. Gopal	315,259	62.26	3.17
INC(O)	M. Meenakshisundaram	169,739	33.52	
Independent	M. Sandhanam	19,618	3.87	
Margin of victory		145,520	28.74	10.56
Turnout		506,396	70.67	−0.51
Registered electors		732,872		23.50
INC hold		Swing	3.17	

=== General Elections 1971 ===
1971 Indian general election: Karur
Party	Candidate	Votes	%	±%
INC	K. Gopal	238,315	59.09	12.09
INC(O)	V. Ramanathan	165,022	40.91	
Margin of victory		73,293	18.17	12.17
Turnout		403,337	71.18	−2.44
Registered electors		593,409		6.98
INC gain from SWA		Swing	6.08	

=== General Elections 1967 ===
1967 Indian general election: Karur
Party	Candidate	Votes	%	±%
SWA	C. Muthuswamy Gounder	209,380	53.00	
INC	R. Chettiar	185,662	47.00	−1.59
Margin of victory		23,718	6.00	−7.65
Turnout		395,042	73.62	9.47
Registered electors		554,715		20.10
SWA gain from INC		Swing	4.41	

=== General Elections 1962 ===
1962 Indian general election: Karur
Party	Candidate	Votes	%	±%
INC	R. Ramanathan	139,385	48.59	−2.31
SWA	P. Ponnambala Gounder	100,229	34.94	
CPI	R. Karuppiah	47,232	16.47	
Margin of victory		39,156	13.65	−1.93
Turnout		286,846	64.15	15.70
Registered electors		461,862		8.06
INC hold		Swing	-2.31	

=== General Elections 1957 ===
1957 Indian general election: Karur
Party	Candidate	Votes	%	±%
INC	K. Periasami Gounder	105,399	50.90	
Independent	V. R. Seshiyan	73,135	35.32	
Independent	Raja Chidambaram	14,369	6.94	
Independent	V. Perumal	14,168	6.84	
Margin of victory		32,264	15.58	
Turnout		207,071	48.45	
Registered electors		427,431		
INC win (new seat)				

== See also ==
- Karur
- List of constituencies of the Lok Sabha
