= Jothimani =

Indian politician (born 1975)

Jothimani Sennimalai
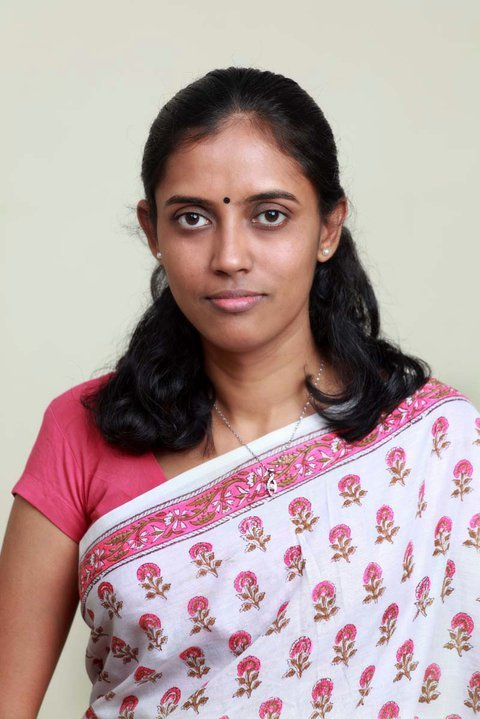

Member of Parliament, Lok Sabha
- Incumbent
- Assumed office 23 May 2019
- Preceded by: M. Thambidurai
- Constituency: Karur

General Secretary of Indian Youth Congress
- In office 2009–2012

Vice President of Tamil Nadu Youth Congress
- In office 2006–2008

Member of Tamil Nadu Censor Board
- In office 2006–2009

Personal details
- Born: 9 August 1975 (age 51) Periya Thirumangalam, Tamil Nadu, India
- Party: Indian National Congress
- Occupation: Writer, political, and social worker

Jothimani Sennimalai (born 9 August 1975), also known mononymously as Jothimani, is an Indian politician, writer, and social worker. A member of the Indian National Congress, she was elected to the Lok Sabha from Karur, Tamil Nadu in 2019. Having joined politics at a young age, Jothimani served separate terms as the General Secretary and Vice President of Indian Youth Congress and Tamil Nadu Youth Congress respectively.

== Early life and education ==
Jothimani was born on 9 August 1975 at Periya Thirumangalam, Aravakurichi, Karur District to Sennimalai and Muthulakshmi. Her father Sennimalai was a farmer. She lost her father Sennimalai in her childhood. With the support of her mother Muthulakshmi, she completed her Graduation at Sri G.V.G Visalakshi College for Women, Udumalaipet. During her college days, she was elected as Chair of College Students Union. She was an active participant in the NSS Camps in college and took part in social service activities.

Her academic degrees include: Master of Arts, Annamalai University, 2003; and Master of Philosophy, Annamalai University, 2005.

== Political career ==
=== Early career ===
Jothimani enter the field of politics at her age of 22. She was an active worker in Indian Youth Congress and a close associate of the Indian National Congress president Rahul Gandhi.

She was Member of Tamil Nadu Censor Board during 2006 to 2009.

She has represented the Indian Youth Congress at international forums like American Council for Young Political Leaders that was held in the US in 2006 and Asian Young Leader's Summit 2009 in Malaysia. She was also selected for Vital-Voice of Asia Asian Women Leaders Meet held in New Delhi in 2010.

Jothimani then unsuccessfully contested the 2011 Tamil Nadu Legislative Assembly election after securing the Indian National Congress' candidature from Karur constituency.

=== Tamil Nadu state assembly election, 2016 ===
In July, 2015, Jothimani launched her election campaign from Aravakurichi constituency for 2016 Tamil Nadu Legislative Assembly election. She has intensified the campaign on the ground and through social media as well. She has been meeting various sections of the people in the constituency and called upon them to give a "missed call" if they supported her candidature. Calendars and pamphlets explaining the initiative have been distributed across the constituency. Her Facebook and Twitter account with the hashtag, 'Aravakurichi 2016,' are replete with postings and pictures of her interaction with voters of the constituency. She has also formed youth groups to reach out to the voters.

When Aravakurichi did not figure on the Congress list, Jothimani stated several criticisms and to contest as an independent candidate. But the alliance leader did not concede. This is one of the few seats that the DMK won in the last Assembly election. More importantly, the sitting MLA, the one who is seeking re-election this time, is K C Palanisamy, an important leader in the party affairs.

After a meeting with her supporters, she said that she has decided not to contest in the Aravakurichi constituency in the overall interest of the Congress party. The Election was about to be held on 16 May 2016. Then the election commission postponed it to 23 May 2016 and again postpone the polling along with Thanjavur Assembly constituencies to 13 June 2016. Finally Election Commission cancelled polls to Aravakurichi and Thanjavur Assembly seats.

=== 2019 Election to the Parliament ===
Jothimani attained the Indian National Congress' candidature for the Indian general election, 2019 from Karur constituency of the Lok Sabha. In what was seen as a major upset by many media outlets and political analyst, Jothimani went on to defeat veteran All India Anna Dravida Munnetra Kazhagam leader, M. Thambidurai who had previously served as Deputy Speaker of the Lok Sabha Speaker and in the Union Cabinet.

=== 2024 Election to the Parliament ===
She was re-elected from Karur Lok Sabha constituency however her vote share and margin of winning both decreased subsequently from 2019.

She became very active in the protest against Government of India during Lok Sabha proceedings. During the 2026 Budget Session of the Lok Sabha, Jothimani was the key protestors among the female Opposition members like Varsha Gaikwad, Pratibha Dhanorkar, R. Sudha, etc who protested during proceedings in the House, in which members entered the vale displaying placards and surrounded the Prime Minister’s seat, leading to an adjournment of proceedings.

== Elections ==
=== Lok Sabha elections ===
Elections	Constituency	Party	Result	Vote percentage	Opposition Candidate	Opposition Party	Opposition vote percentage	Reference
2014	Karur	INC	Lost	2.95	M. Thambidurai	AIADMK	52.36	
2019	Karur	INC	Won	63.1	M. Thambidurai	AIADMK	24.9	
2024	Karur	INC	Won	47.3	Thangavel L	AIADMK	32.5	

=== Tamil Nadu Legislative elections ===
Elections	Constituency	Party	Result	Vote percentage	Opposition Candidate	Opposition Party	Opposition vote percentage	Reference
2011	Karur	INC	Lost	34.10	V. Senthil Balaji	AIADMK	61.18	

== Positions held ==
=== State level ===
- Councillor of K.Paramathi panchayat union for two terms from 1996 to 2006.
- District General Secretary of Karur district Congress from 1997 to 2004.
- Council Member of Tamil Nadu Congress Commeitte from 1998 to 2000.
- Vice President, Tamil Nadu Youth Congress from 2006 to 2008.
- Member, Tamil Nadu Censor Board from 2006 to 2009.

=== National level ===
- Indian Youth Congress National Coordinator- Kerala – 2008 (Appointed through State level talent search by Young Congress MPs).
- Indian Youth Congress general secretary – 2009 to 2012 (Appointed by Rahul Gandhi, through National level talent search).
- State Returning Officer, Youth Congress Election – Kerala (Additional sharge).
- Media panelist on State issues in Indian National Congress.
- 2019–present (23 May 2019) Member 17th Lok Sabha - Karur constituency

== Books ==
- Ottrai Vasanai – Short story collection
- Sithirak Koodu – Novel
- Neer Pirakku Munn (Translated into English as No shortcut to Leadership)

== Awards ==
- Ilakkiya Chinthanai Award for Best short story, 1999
- Shakthi Award for Best short story collection, 2007

== See also ==
- P Chidambaram
- Indian Youth Congress
- Rahul Gandhi
- E V K S Elangovan
