= C. Muthuswamy Gounder =

Indian politician (1917–1990)

Muthuswamy Gounder

Member of Parliament (Lok Sabha) for Karur
- In office 1967–1971
- Prime Minister: Indira Gandhi
- Preceded by: None

Personal details
- Born: 16 October 1917
- Died: 16 November 1990 (aged 73)
- Party: Swatantra Party
- Profession: Politician

C. Muthuswamy Gounder (16 October 1917 – 16 November 1990) was an Indian Swatantra Party politician from the state of Tamil Nadu who served as the Member of Parliament for Karur from 1967 to 1971.

== Background ==
Muthuswamy Gounder was born on 16 October 1917 to a prominent family of Karur in Tamil Nadu (then in Madras Presidency). His father was a district-level politician and member of the taluk and district boards while his uncle was a member of Lok Sabha. Muthuswamy graduated in agricultural science before entering politics.

== Politics ==
Muthuswamy, initially, joined the Indian National Congress and served as a Pradesh Congress Committee member. In 1957, he left the Indian National Congress and joined the National Democratic Congress started by Rajaji. He was the Joint Secreatary of the National Democratic Congress until it merger with the Swatantra Party. He became the President of the Trichy district unit of the Swatanta Party and successfully stood for election to the Lok Sabha from Karur.

Muthuswamy served as the Member of Parliament for Karur from 1967 to 1971 when he lost to K. Gopal of the Indian National Congress.

== Death ==
Muthuswamy Gounder died in Madras on 16 November 1990, at the age of 73.
