= M. A. Kuddus Badsha Sahib =

Indian merchant, politician and philanthropist

Khan Bahadur Mohammed Abdul Kuddus Badsha Sahib (born February 14, 1865) was an Indian merchant, politician and philanthropist of the Madras Presidency. He was also one of the founders of the Indian Bank.

== Early life ==
Kuddus Badsha Sahib was born on February 14, 1865, in Madras. He was the seventh son of Haji Mohammed Badsha Sahib, one of the richest businessmen in South India and founder of Messrs H. Mohammed Badsha Sahib & Co, a leading textile firm.

Kuddus Badsha Sahib was educated in private and at the Madrassa-i-Azam where he learnt English, Arabic, Persian, Hindusthani, Tamil and Telugu.

== Business career ==
Kuddus Sahib started his own business in 1883 but in 1894, acquired a partnership in his father's textile firm. Soon, he acquired recognition for his business acumen and organised welfare schemes for the benefit of the Muslim community of Madras

== Positions held ==
Kuddus Badsha Sahib had served as the Vice-Consul at the Turkish Consulate in Madras, trustee of the Madras Port Trust, Vice-President of the South Indian Chamber of Commerce, Vice-President of the South Indian Athlectics Association and commissioner of the Corporation of Madras. He also served as the Vice President of the Madras Province Muslims League and was a member of the Madras Legislative Council from December 1909 to December 1912.
