= K. Gopal (INC politician) =

Indian politician

K. Gopal was an Indian politician and former Member of Parliament elected from Tamil Nadu. He was elected to the Lok Sabha from Karur constituency as an Indian National Congress candidate in 1971 and 1977 election.
