= M. Ct. Muthiah =

Indian industrialist and banker (1929–2006)

M. Ct. Muthaiah
- Born: Muthaiah Chidambaram Muthaiah; 19 October 1929
- Died: 18 September 2006 (aged 76)
- Education: The Doon School, Dehradun; University of Allahabad
- Occupations: Banker; Industrialist; Philanthropist
- Parents: M. Ct. M. Chidambaram Chettyar; C. Valliammai Achi
- Relatives: M. Ct. Pethachi (Brother)

Muthiah Chidambaram Muthiah (19 October 1929 – 18 September 2006) was an Indian industrialist, banker and philanthropist who served as the Chairman of the Indian Overseas Bank from 1954 to 1969.

== Early life ==
Muthiah was born on 19 October 1929 to industrialist M. Ct. M. Chidambaram Chettyar and C. Valliammai Achi. He had his schooling at The Doon School, Dehradun and graduated from University of Allahabad. Muthiah did his M.B.A. in Chicago. Muthiah has a younger brother M. Ct. Pethachi.

== Career ==
Muthiah took over the family business in 1954 on the early death of his father in an aeroplane crash. Muthiah served as the Chairman of the Indian Overseas Bank from 1954 until its nationalisation in 1969. He also served as the Chairman of the United Fire and General Insurance company and was President of the Southern Indian Chamber of Commerce and Industry. Muthiah also served as President of the Andhra Pradesh State Finance Corporation and was one of the directors of Indian Bank.

== Trustee ==
He was president of the Trust Boards that run the M.Ct.M. Boys and Lady M.Ct. M. Girls Schools, besides Sir M.Ct. Trust Centenary School.

== Death ==
Muthiah died in his sleep on 18 September 2006 due to a heart disease.
