= Southern Indian Chamber of Commerce and Industry =

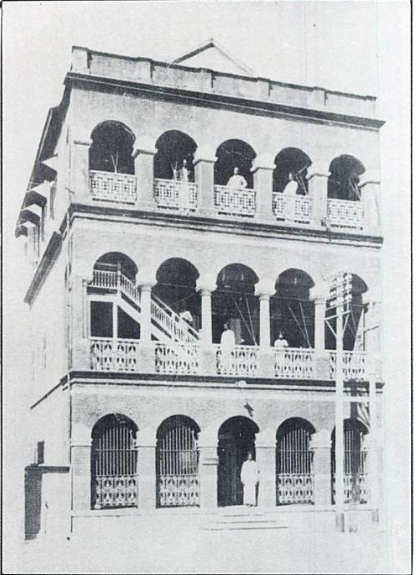
Offices of the Southern Indian Chamber of Commerce, circa 1939

Southern Indian Chamber of Commerce and Industry, formerly Southern Indian Chamber of Commerce, is a non-government, not-for-profit, industry-led and industry-managed organisation, whose primary function is to work for the development of industries in South India. It is one of the founder-members of the Federation of Indian Chambers of Commerce and Industry (FICCI)

== History ==
The Southern Indian Chamber of Commerce was founded with about 100 members, at Ramakoti Buildings, the headquarters of the Indian Bank, on 9 October 1909. South Indian politician Sir P. Theagaraya Chetty was its first President. Some of the important founder-members of the chamber were Jamal Mohamed Rowther Sahib, M. A. Kuddus Badsha Sahib, Lodd Govindoss Chathurbhujadoss, D. V. Hanumant Rao, Pandit Vidya Sagar Pandya.
