= M. A. Muthiah Chettiar =

Indian banker and politician (1905-1984)

RAJAH OF CHETTINAD Rajah Sir M. A. Muthiah Chettiar
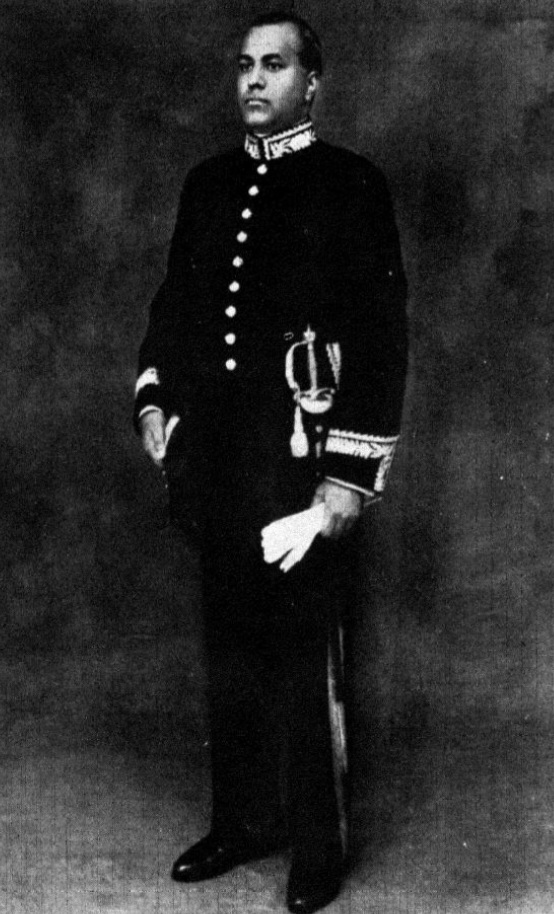
- Rajah Sir Muthiah Chettiar

Member of Constituent Assembly of India
- In office 9 December 1946 – 24 January 1950

Minister of Education and Excise (Madras Presidency)
- In office 10 October 1936 – 14 July 1937
- Premier: Ramakrishna Ranga Rao of Bobbili, P. T. Rajan, Kurma Venkata Reddy Naidu
- Governor: George Frederick Stanley
- Preceded by: S. Kumaraswami Reddiar
- Succeeded by: P. Subbarayan

Mayor Of Madras
- In office 8 March 1933 – 1935
- Preceding: Incumbency
- Succeeded by: Abdul Hameed Khan

Personal details
- Born: 5 August 1905 Chettinad Palace, Kanadukathan, Madras Presidency, British India
- Died: 12 May 1984 (aged 78) Chettinad House, Madras, Tamil Nadu, India
- Party: Justice Party
- Children: M. A. M. Muthiah, M. A. M. Ramaswamy
- Awards: Padma Bhushan(1973)

Sir Muthiah Annamalai Muthiah Chettiar, Rajah of Chettinad KCSI (5 August 1905 – 12 May 1984) better known as Rajah Sir Muthiah Chettiar was an Indian Industrialist, banker, politician, philanthropist, and cultural activist who served as First Mayor of Madras city (1933) and Minister of Excise and Education (1936–37) in the provincial government of Madras Presidency.

Muthiah Chettiar was holder of the hereditary title Kumar-rajah (1929–48) and later, Rajah of Chettinad (1948–84).

His father Rajah Sir Annamalai Chettiar was also a famous educationist and founder of the Annamalai University in the town of Chidambaram in Tamil Nadu. He was also the third Nattukottai Chettiar to be knighted; the first two were his nephew and father. The government of Tamil Nadu honoured him with the title Tamil Isai Kavalar.

== Early life ==
He was born on 5 August 1905, son of Dr. Rajah Sir Annamalai Chettiar, the Raja of Chettinad and a distinguished member of the Nattukottai Nagarathar community. He studied mostly in Madras, graduating from the Presidency College, Chennai in 1922. He then went to Burma on his family's business, acquiring expertise in banking.

== As a banker ==
He became a member of the Madras Legislative Council, representing the South Indian Chamber of Commerce and Industry, with which he was associated for 50 years, and was elected its President in 1941. He was appointed member of the Provincial Banking Enquiry Committee (1931). In 1929, he became a member of the Corporation of Madras and was elected mayor in 1933 and 1934. In 1943, he was elected president of the Federation of the Indian Chambers of Commerce and industry. He was associated with the Imperial Bank of India (now the State Bank of India) and the Indian Bank.

== As an educationist ==
Interest in education was part of the family heritage. He was associated with his father in making Sri Meenakshi College, Chidambaram the nucleus of Annamalai University. While pursuing his political career as Chief Whip and Legislative Assembly Chairman of the Justice Party, he retained his interest in education. In 1936 he was appointed Minister-in-Charge of education, Public Health and Excise, and was also the pro-Chancellor of Madras University for over a year. He remained on the Board of Management of the Pachaiyappa's Charities for 33 years. He was also on the Syndicate of the Madras University and the Board of Management of the Indian Institute of Technology, Madras. In 1948 he became Pro-Chancellor of Annamalai University which expanded to include the faculties of Education, Fine Arts, Culture, Law and Medicine. Two UGC centres of advanced study in marine biology and linguistics came into being. The Engineering and Technology Department developed into a post-graduate centre. The Muthiah Polytechnic, Annamalainagar, and the Annamalai Polytechnic, Chettinad, were established.

He was interested in the study of Tamil language, literature, music and culture. His services to the Tamil cause earned him the title of Tamil Isai Kavalar.

== In politics ==
He earned the reputation of being a sensitive Parliamentarian, impartial and balanced, as a leader of the opposition in 1939 and when he held charge of Local Administration and Hindu Religious Endowments. He was the first Mayor of Chennai (then called Madras) when the mayoralty was reinstated for the Corporation of Chennai in 1933. The mayoralty had been earlier removed in 1792, when the act made Madras a municipality. In 1946 he was elected member of the Constituent Assembly at New Delhi.

== Awards and legacy ==
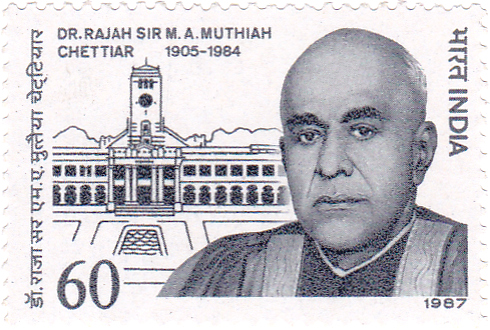
MA Muthiah Chettiar 1987 stamp of India

He was knighted in the 1941 King's Birthday Honours, and was invested by the Viceroy of India on 24 June 1941. He also had the rare honour of hosting a lunch in the Chettinad House for Queen Elizabeth II and the Duke of Edinburgh. The government of India bestowed on him Padma Bhushan in 1973, and the Tamil Nadu government honoured him with the "Tamil Isai Kavalar" title in 1979. New York World University awarded an honorary doctorate to him in 1982. He died on 12 May 1984 in Madras leaving an impressive record of interests and achievements. The Indian government honoured him with a postal stamp issued on his memory on 21 December 1987.

| Preceded by None | Mayor of Madras; 8 March 1933 – 7 November 1933 | Succeeded by W. W. Ladden |
| Preceded by W. W. Ladden | Mayor of Madras; 1934–1935 | Succeeded by Abdul Hameed Khan |
