= A. C. Muthiah =

Indian industrialist and cricket administrator

- Born: 1941 (age 84–85); Madras, Madras Province, British India
- Education: College of Engineering, Guindy, Madras University, University of Detroit Mercy
- Occupations: Industrialist and cricket administrator
- Spouse: Devaki Muthiah
- Children: Ashwin and 2 daughters
- Parent: M. A. Chidambaram (father)

25th President of BCCI
- In office 1999–2001
- Preceded by: Raj Singh Dungarpur
- Succeeded by: Jagmohan Dalmiya

Annamalai Chidambaram Muthiah (born 1941) is an Indian industrialist and cricket administrator. He served as the Chairman of Southern Petrochemical Industries Limited (SPIC) and is the chairman of Sri Venkateswara College of Engineering (SVCE), Sriperumbudur near Chennai. He served as the President of the Board of Control for Cricket in India from 1999 to 2001. Muthiah is the only son of M. A. Chidambaram and the grandson of Sir Annamalai Chettiar.

== Early life and education ==
Muthiah was born in 1941 to industrialist and cricket administrator M. A. Chidambaram. He was Chidambaram's only son, his other child being a daughter Seetha. He is cousin of former Indian Home Minister P. Chidambaram. Maternal grandfather of P. Chidambaram is the paternal grandfather of Muthiah.

Muthiah attended the Madras Christian College Higher Secondary School and graduated with a degree in Mechanical Engineering from the College of Engineering, Guindy. He then proceeded to get his master's degree from the University of Detroit Mercy. On completion of his education, Muthiah joined the family-run Southern Petrochemical Industries Limited. He also has a post doctorate in science expertise.

== Career ==
Muthiah took charge of the Southern Petrochemical Industries Limited (SPIC) on the death of his father Chidambaram in the year 2000. Muthiah served as the Director of Standard Motors, Tamil Nadu Petroproducts Limited, Southern Petrochemical Industries and SPEL Semiconductor Ltd. He also served as Director of Henkel India Limited, Tuticorin Alkali Chemicals & Fertilisers Ltd.

Like his father, Muthiah is also a cricket enthusiast and was an active in cricket administration. He served as the president of the Tamil Nadu Cricket Association from the 1994–95 season to the 2001–02 season. From 1999 to 2001, Muthiah served as the President of the Board of Control for Cricket in India.

Muthiah was the president of the Federation of Indian Chambers of Commerce and Industry (FICCI) in its Platinum Jubilee year 2003. Muthiah was a Member of the Prime Minister's Advisory Council on Trade and Industry. He was a member of the executive boards of the International Cricket Council, and the Marylebone Cricket Club. He was also conferred the Rotary International District Vocational Services Award for his outstanding efforts in business ethics in the year 1999. Muthiah awarded an Honorary Doctorate (Honoris Causa) in Science in February 1992 from Anna University.

Muthiah serves as a member of the board of trustees at The Voluntary Health Services. He continues to be associated with Tamizh Isai Sangam which was founded by his father.

Muthiah is the Managing trustee of MAC (Education) Foundation, a public charitable trust founded by his father Dr. M. A. Chidambaram, which runs the School & College of Nursing in Chennai. MAC Trust, on the occasion of the birth anniversary of his father M. A. Chidambaram, every year, confers Sir Annamalai Chettiar Award for outstanding contribution to and promotion of Tamil language and literature; Dr. M. A. Chidambaram Award for excellence in fine arts; and the Dr. A. C. Muthiah Award for achievement as a first generation entrepreneur.

== Family ==
Muthiah is married to Devaki and has a son and two daughters.

== User Guide ==
- "Executive Profile - A. C. Muthiah". Business Week. Archived from the original on 11 October 2012.
- "TNCA - Office Bearers". Tamil Nadu Cricket Association.
