= M. A. M. Ramaswamy =

Indian industrialist

RAJAH OF CHETTINAD M.A.M. Ramasamy Chettiar
- Born: 30 September 1931; Chettinad House, Chennai
- Died: 2 December 2015 (aged 84); Chennai
- Occupation: Industrialist
- Children: M.A.M.R.Muthiah
- Father: Rajah Sir M.A. Muthiah Chettiar
- Family: S.RM Family

Muthiah Annamalai Muthiah Ramaswamy Chettiar (30 September 1931 – 2 December 2015) better known as Rajah M.A.M.Ramasamy Chettiar was an Indian industrialist, politician and race horse owner who served as Chairman of the Chettinad Group of Companies and a member of the Upper House of the Parliament of India, the Rajya Sabha for Karnataka representing the Janata Dal (Secular) from 2004 to 2010.

Ramaswamy succeeded his older brother M. A. M. Muthiah in 1970 to the title "Kumar-rajah of Chettinad" and held title Raja of Chettinad from 1984 to 2015. With a net worth of Rs.1,500 crores, Ramaswamy was one of the richest individuals in Chennai city. He was also popular in the racing circles of Chennai city and winner of 600 horse racing classics.

== Early life ==
Ramaswamy was born in Madras, Tamil Nadu on 30 September 1931, as the second son of Sir M. A. Muthiah Chettiar, the Kumar-rajah of Chettinad. Ramaswamy had an older brother Muthiah, upon whose death in 1970 at the age of 40, Ramaswamy inherited the title Kumar-rajah of Chettinad and Chairmanship of the Chettinad Group of Companies. Ramaswamy was also a maternal cousin of former Indian finance minister, P. Chidambaram.

Ramaswamy married Sigappi Aachi on 6 February 1951. He died on 2 December 2015.
