= S. Rm. M. Annamalai Chettiar =

Indian industrialist and philanthropist (1881–1948)

RAJAH OF CHETTINAD Rajah Sir S.RM.M. Annamalai Chettiar
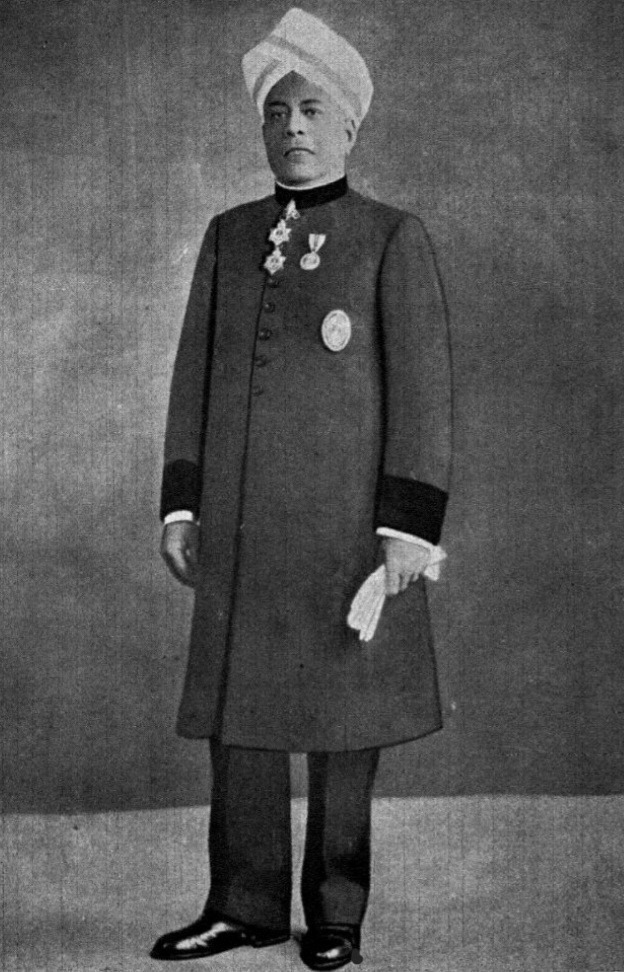
- Rajah sir Annamalai Chettiar in London
- Born: 30 September 1881; Kanadukathan, Madura District, Madras Presidency, British India (now in Sivaganga district, Tamil Nadu, India)
- Died: 15 June 1948 (aged 66); Madras, Madras Province, Dominion of India (now Chennai, Tamil Nadu, India)
- Occupations: Industrialist; Philanthropist
- Spouse: Rani Lady Seethai Aachi
- Children: 4, including M. A. Muthiah Chettiar, M. A. Chidambaram
- Parent: S. Rm. Muthiah Chettiar (father)
- Relatives: S. Rm. family M. Ct. family

Diwan Bahadur Sir Satappa Ramanatha Muthiah Annamalai Chettiar, Raja of Chettinad KCSI (30 September 1881 – 15 June 1948) better known as Raja Sir Annamalai Chettiar was an Indian industrialist, banker, educationist and philanthropist from Tamil Nadu. He was the founder of Annamalai University in Chidambaram and one of the founders of Indian Bank, along with his brother S. Rm. M. Ramaswami Chettiar.

Born to S. Rm. Muthiah Chettiar of a wealthy Nattukottai Nagarathar family, Annamalai Chettiar joined the family business early and expanded their banking operations to South-East Asia. Annamalai Chettiar was one of the founders of Indian Bank along with his brother S. Rm. M. Ramaswami Chettiar and served as the first governor of the Imperial Bank of India. He also served a term as a member of the Council of State, the upper house of the Imperial Legislative Council of India and was honoured with a knighthood in 1923 and the hereditary title of Raja of Chettinad in 1929.

== Early life ==
Annamalai Chettiar was born on 30 September 1881 at Kanadukathan in the Sivaganga estate of the then Madura district in the Madras Presidency of British India. His father, S.R. Muthiah Chettiar was a noted banker. His brother Ramaswami Chettiar was one of the founders of the Indian Bank of which Annamalai Chettiar later served as a director. After his schooling, he joined his family business and spent a considerable time in England. On his return home, he became the head of the civic body of Karaikudi and the District Board.

== Career ==
In 1916, he transferred from local affairs to the Legislative Council of Madras Presidency, where he sat for 3 years. In 1920, he stood for election to the Council of State and held his seat in the council for three consecutive terms. He was appointed one of the governors of the Imperial Bank of India in 1921. Annamalai Chettiar established Sri Meenakshi College at Chidambaram in 1920. A Tamil College was added in 1927 and an Oriental Training College and College of Music were established. All these institutions were combined to form the Annamalai University on 1 January 1929. He died on 15 June 1948.

== Honours ==
Chettiar was given the title Diwan Bahadur by King George V for valuable services rendered to the Crown. Later, he was conferred the honour of knighthood in the 1923 Birthday Honours. In 1929, he was conferred the title of hereditary Raja of Chettinad.

== Family and legacy ==
Annamalai Chettiar's oldest son M. A. Muthiah Chettiar, an activist of the Tamil Isai Movement, served as a Minister of Education and Excise in the Madras Presidency while his third son M. A. Chidambaram and grandson A. C. Muthiah both served as presidents of the Board of Control for Cricket in India (BCCI). Annamalai Chettiar is the maternal grandfather of former Finance Minister of India P. Chidambaram.

The suburb of Raja Annamalaipuram in Chennai is named after Annamalai Chettiar. Indian Posts and Telegraphs Department issued a commemorative stamp in his honor.
