= S. Rm. M. Ramaswami Chettiar =

Indian businessman

Diwan Bahadur S. Rm. M. Ramaswami Chettiar
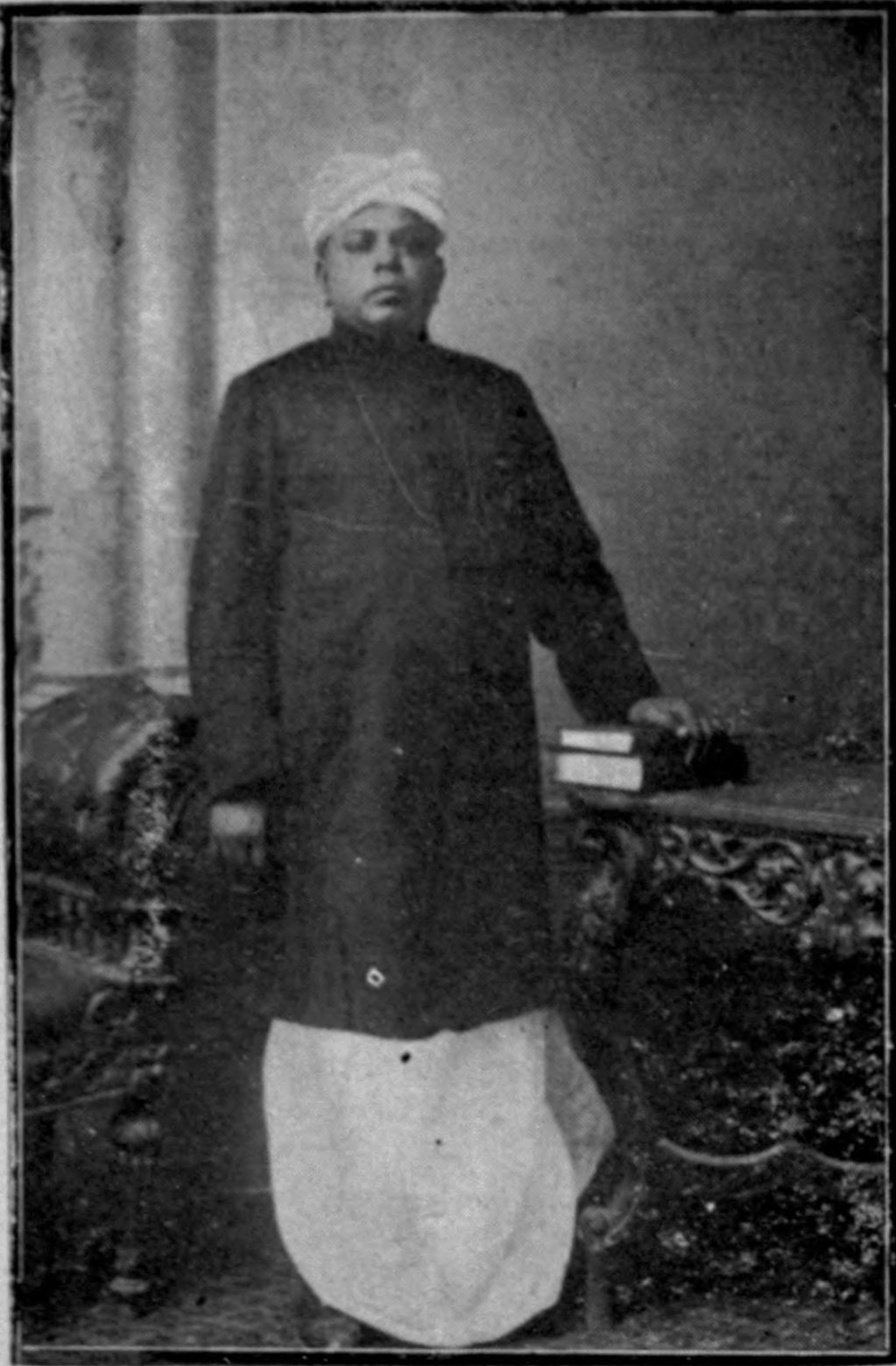

Member of Madras Legislative Council
- In office December 1909 – 1912

Personal details
- Born: 1872
- Died: 5 November 1918 (age 46) Madras
- Occupation: Legislator
- Profession: Businessman

Diwan Bahadur Satappa Ramanatha Muthiah Ramaswami Chettiar (1872 – 5 November 1918) was an Indian businessman from what is now the state of Tamil Nadu.

== Early life ==
Ramaswami Chettiar was born in 1872 to S. Rm. Muthiah Chettiar of Kanadukathan, Chettinad. who was well known for his philanthropic activities. Muthiah Chettiar had renovated Nataraja temple at Chidambaram. Ramaswami was the second son of Muthiah Chettiar. His younger brother was Raja Sir Annamalai Chettiar.

== Indian Bank ==
In 1906, the Arbuthnot Bank, the biggest banking institution in Madras City, crashed leaving thousands penniless. As a result, the idea of an Indian-owned bank was floated. The Indian Bank eventually came into being the very same year. Ramaswami Chettiar was one of the founder-directors of the bank.

In 1907, Ramaswamy Chettiar resigned and was succeeded as director by his younger brother Annamalai Chettiar.

== Philanthropic activities ==
In 1912, Ramaswami Chettiar donated rupees one lakh to the Chidambaram Municipal Board for the construction of water works in the town. Ramaswami Chettiar established the Ramaswami Chettiar Town High School in Chidambaram in 1915.
