= Kanadukathan =

Kanadukathan Chettinad
- Town Panchayat
- Location in Tamil Nadu, India
- Coordinates: 10.16667°N 78.79111°E
- Country: India
- State: Tamil Nadu
- District: Sivaganga

Population (2001)
  - Total: 4,814

Languages
  - Official: Tamil
- Time zone: UTC+5:30 (IST)

Kanadukathan is a Town Panchayat in the Karaikudi taluk of the Indian state of Tamil Nadu.

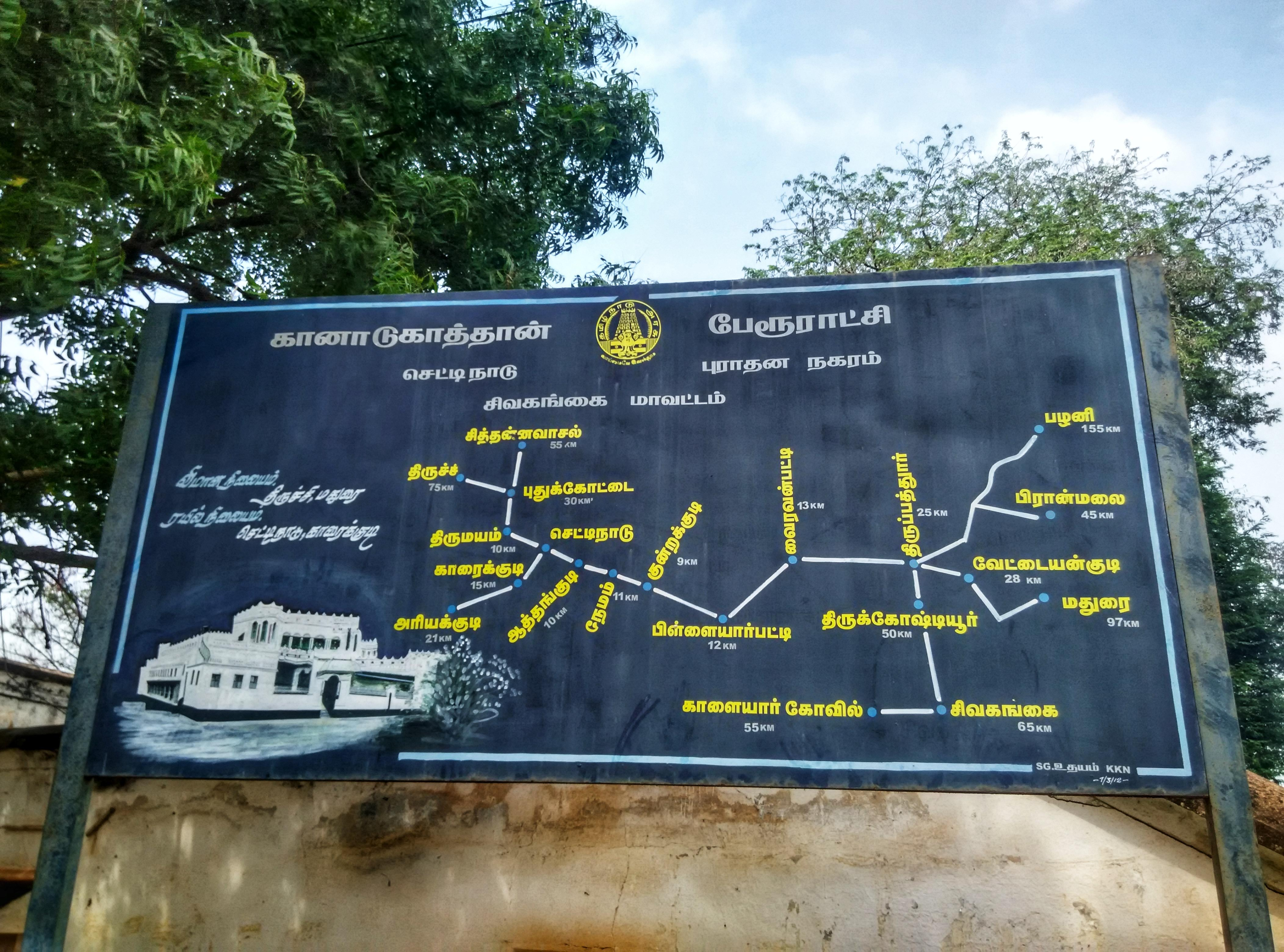
Tourism map of Kanadukathan

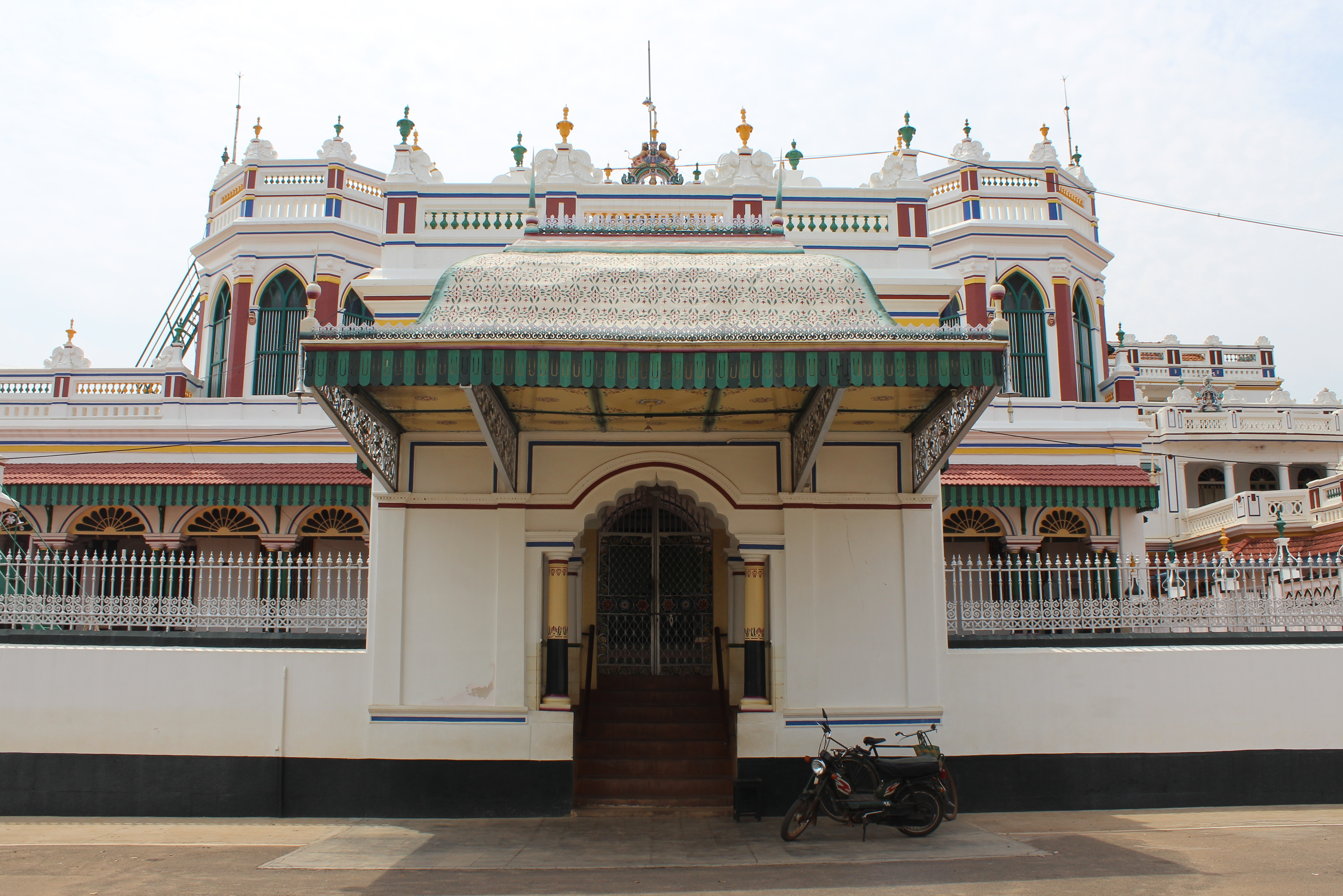
Kanadukathan Chettinadu Palace Entrance - Chettinadu architecture.

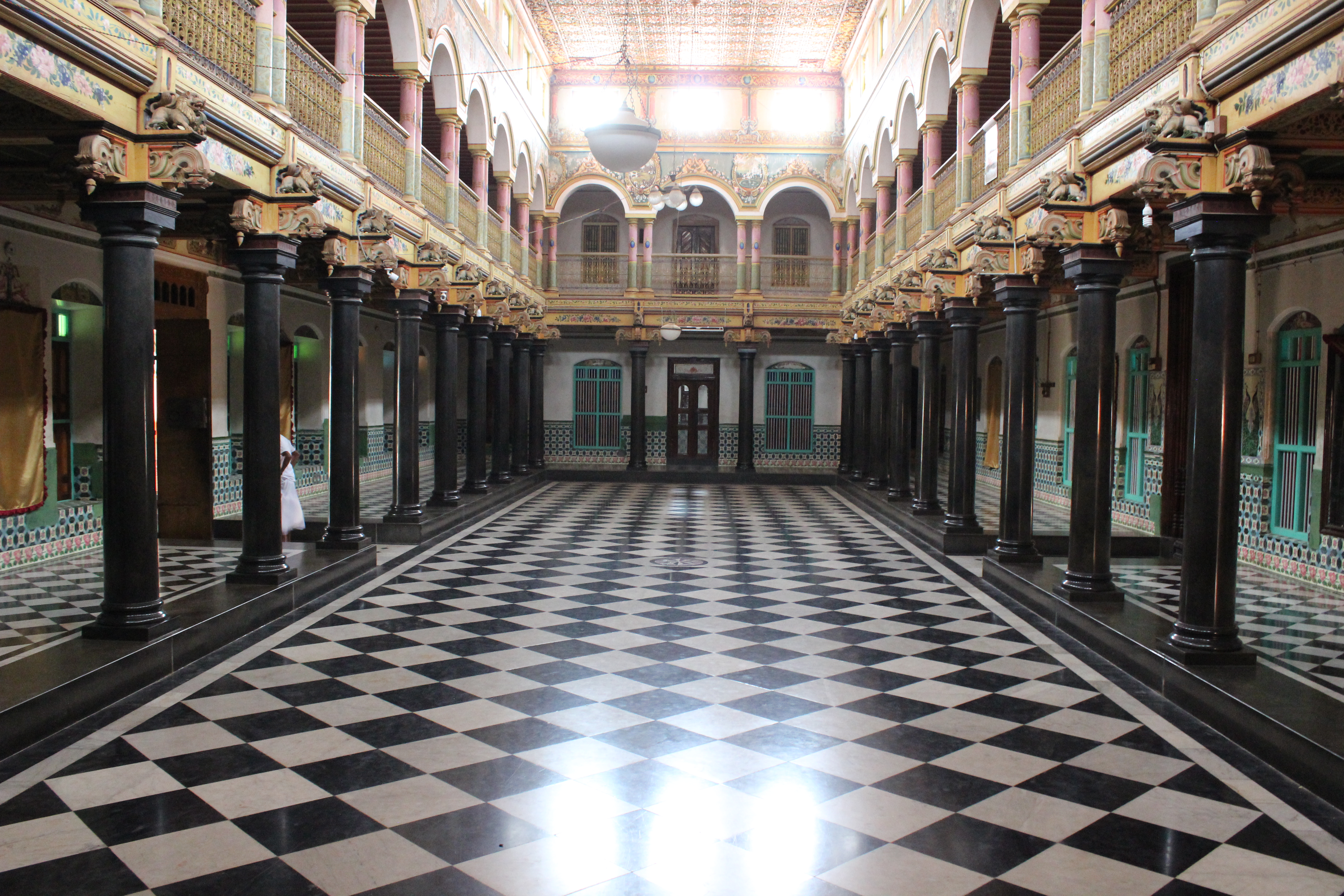
Inside of a typical chettinadu house - chettinadu architecture.

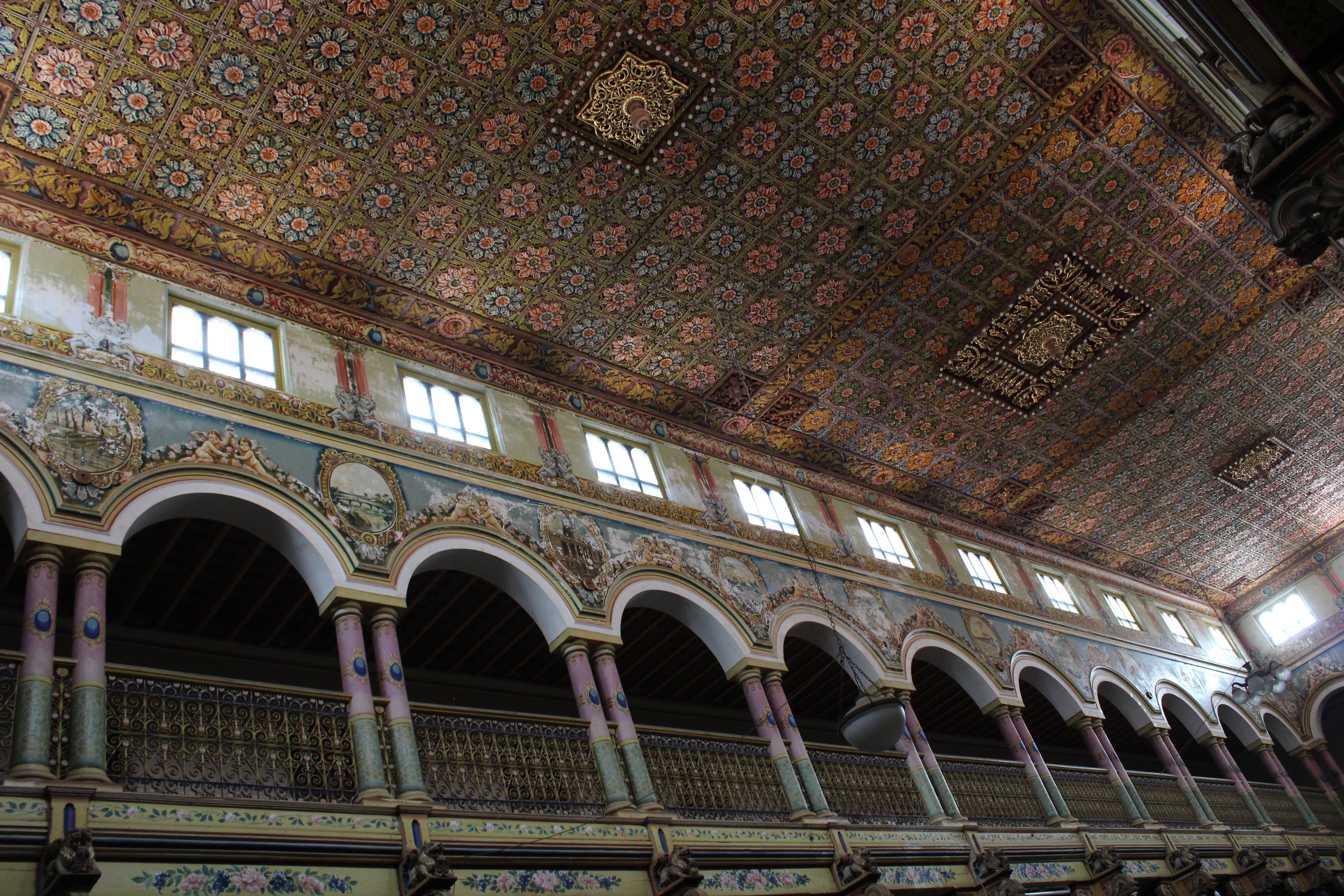
Rooftop of a typical chettinadu house - chettinadu architecture.

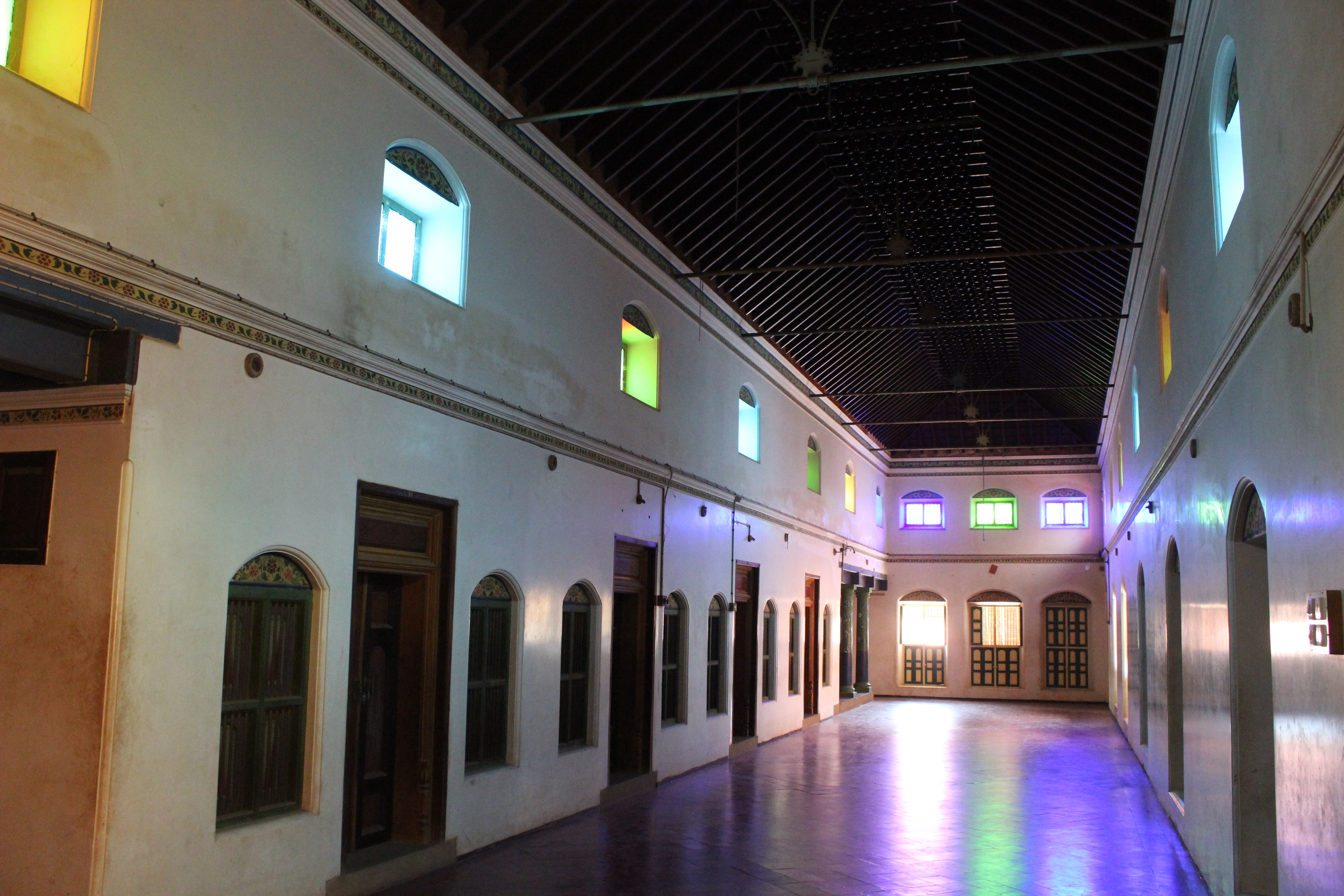
Dining hall inside a chettinadu house - chettinadu architecture.

== Demographics ==
In 2001, Kanadukathan had a population of 4,795 people. Of these, 10% were under 6 years of age. The town is evenly split between males and females. Kanadukathan has a literacy rate of 74%, higher than the national average of 63.4%. According to the Indian census, the male literacy rate is 80% and the female literacy rate is 67%.

== Specialities ==
Kanadukathan is most famous for its Chettinad cuisine and for the architecture of its houses, whose main entrances are shaped to resemble those of temples.

== Events ==
- Festival of the Goddess of Beauty (Tamil: பொன்னழகி அம்மன் திருவிழா) is a 10-day festival held in May every year.
- Hari Poojai is held in May every year.
- Sivarathiri is held in March. During Shivaratri, people take kavadi from Pazhaiyur (old Kanadukathan) to the Solai Andavar Temple (approximately 4 km).
- festival of the nagamuthu mariamman temple chiththira full moon day function is a 10 days

festival held in April–May every year

== Schools / Colleges ==
- M.ct.M.Chidambaram Chettiyar Higher Secondary School [ISO 9001 Certified]
- M.ct.M.Chidambaram Chettiyar Elementary School
- CV.CT.V.Meenakshi Achi Matriculation School
- Annamalai Polytechnic College

== Places of interest ==
- Pillayarpatti Kovil—religious site 1,600 years old Hindu Temple (16 km)
- Kundrakudi Murugan Kovil—religious site (Hill Temple), Hindu Temple (14 km)
- Thirumayam Fort — historical site (10 km)
- Chettinad Palace — It was designed by Annamalai Chettiyar with European influence in its architecture.
- Island Bungalow — heritage site (2 km)
- CVCT CVRM House - Unique Historical Chettinad Twin Houses
- MJR VELAN AGENCY
- Chettinadu Mansion( S A R M HOUSE)

== Connection with major cities ==
- By road: located on Trichy – Rameshwaram National Highway [NH-210].

- 14 km from Karaikudi
- 32 km from Pudukkottai
- 82 km from Trichy
- 90 km from Madurai
- 159 km from Rameshwaram
- 287 km from Coimbatore
- 405 km from Chennai

- By train: Chettinad station is located on the Trichy – Rameswhwaram line. The following expresses stop at this station.

- The Chennai – Rameshwaram express (16701)
- Rameshwaram – Chennai express (16702)
- Trichy- Rameshwaram, Trichy-Karaikudi, Trichy-Manamadurai and Manamadurai-Mannargudi Passenger Trains

Requests have been made to operate a daily overnight train between Coimbatore and Rameswaram via Kanadukathan (CTND).
