= Raja of Chettinad =

Title given on the head of the S. Rm. M. family of Kanadukathan in the Tamil Nadu, India

The Raja of Chettinad was an honorary title bestowed on the head of the S. Rm. M. family of Kanadukathan in the Chettinad region by the government of the Madras Presidency during the British Raj era in India. The title was first bestowed upon Sir Annamalai Chettiar in 1929 in recognition of his public service and has been described by Hartmut Scharfe as a "fictitious hereditary title" of the type that it was possible to confer in accordance with the traditions of the ancient Indian epic text, the Mahabharata.

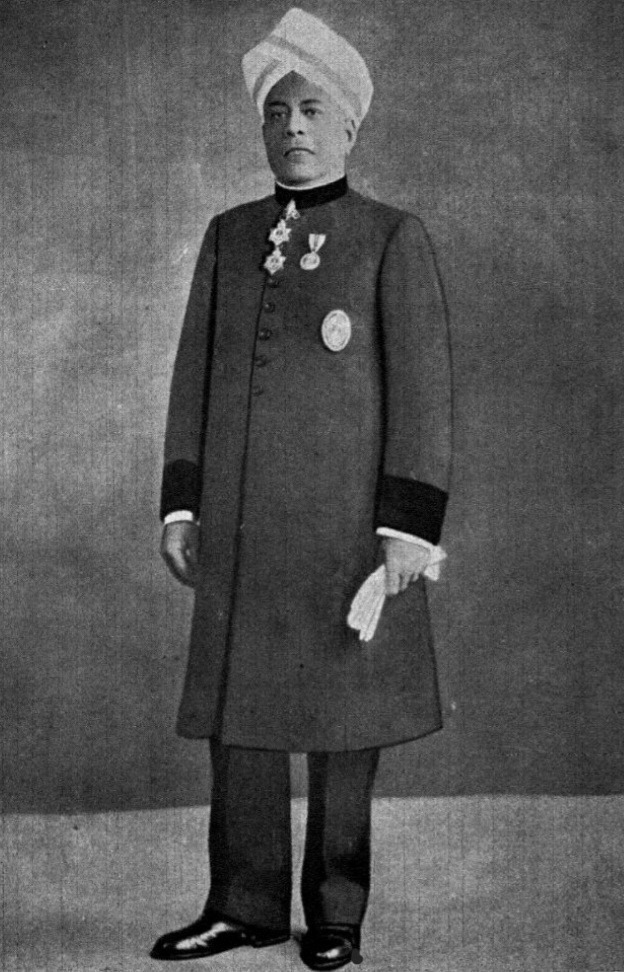
Rajah Sir S.RM.M.Annamalai Chettiar in London

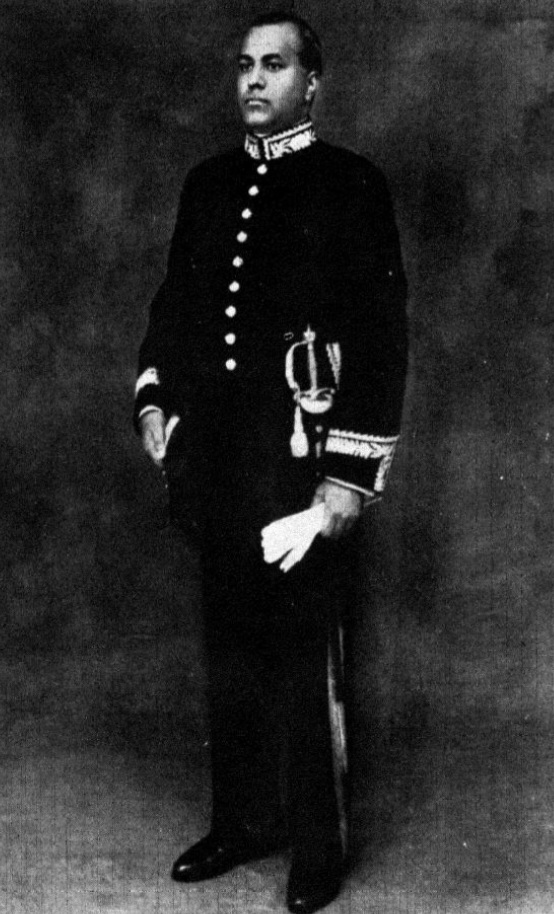
Rajah Sir M.A.Muthiah Chettiar

== List of Rajahs ==
- Sir Annamalai Chettiar (1929–48)
- M. A. Muthiah Chettiar (1948–84)
- M. A. M. Ramaswamy (1984–2015)
- M. A. M. M. Annamalai (2026–present)

== List of Kumarrajahs ==
The heir-apparent was known as "Kumarrajah".

- M. A. Muthiah Chettiar (1929–48)
- M. A. M. Muthiah (1948–70)
- M. A. M. Ramaswamy (1970–84)
