= Indian Bank =

Indian nationalised bank established in 1907

- Type: Public
- Traded as: BSE: 532814; NSE: INDIANB
- Industry: Banking, Financial services
- Founded: 15 August 1907; 119 years ago
- Founder: S. Rm. M. Ramaswami Chettiar
- Headquarters: Chennai, India
- Number of locations: 6,003 Branches; 5,676 ATMs & BNAs
- Key people: Binod Kumar (MD & CEO)
- Products: Consumer Banking; Corporate Banking; Finance and Insurance; Mortgage Loans; Investment banking Merchant banking Private equity Private banking Savings wealth management Credit cards
- Revenue: ▲₹77,441 crore (US$8.3 billion) (2026)
- Operating income: ▲₹19,916 crore (US$2.1 billion) (2026)
- Net income: ▲₹12,156 crore (US$1.3 billion) (2026)
- Total assets: ▲₹895,503 crore (US$96 billion) (2025)
- Owner: Government of India (73.84%)
- Number of employees: 40,161
- Subsidiaries: 1. Indbank Merchant Banking Services Limited (64.84%); 2. Indbank Global Support Services Limited (100%); 3. Universal Sompo General Insurance (Joint Venture 28.52%)
- Capital ratio: CRAR 17.93%
- Rating: S&P BBB / Stable / A-2/
- Website: indianbank.bank.in

Indian Bank is an Indian public sector bank, established in 1907 and headquartered in Chennai. Since 1969, the Government of India has owned the bank. It is under the jurisdiction of the Department of Financial Services within the Ministry of Finance.

It has 40,161 employees, 6,001 branches with 5,657 ATMs and Cash deposit machines. It has overseas branches in Colombo and Singapore including foreign currency banking units in Colombo and Jaffna. It has 227 overseas correspondent banks in 75 countries. Allahabad Bank merged with Indian Bank on 1 April 2020, making it the seventh largest bank in India.

== History ==
=== Early formation and expansion ===
In the last quarter of 1906, Madras (now Chennai) was hit by the worst financial crisis the city was ever to suffer. Of the three best-known British commercial names in 19th-century Madras, one crashed; a second had to be resurrected by a distress sale; and the third had to be bailed out by a benevolent benefactor. Arbuthnot & Co, which failed, was considered the soundest of the three. Parry's (now EID Parry), may have been the earliest of them, and Binny and Co.'s founders may have had the oldest associations with Madras, but it was Arbuthnot, established in 1810s, that was the city's strongest commercial organisation in the 19th century. A key figure in the bankruptcy case for Arbuthnot's was the Madras lawyer, V. Krishnaswamy Iyer who founded the Indian Bank, which was an offshoot of nationalistic fervour and the Swadeshi movement, when the then British Arbuthnot Bank collapsed and the Indian Bank emerged. Mr V. Krishnaswamy Iyer solicited the support of the Nagarathar Chettiars authored by Mr. Ramasamy Chettiar, who was Annamalai Chettiar's elder brother. Sri V. Krishnaswamy Iyer and Mr. Ramasamy Chettiar were one of the first directors of Indian Bank. Later on, in 1915, Mr. Annamalai Chettiar was inducted into the board of the Indian Bank. It commenced operations on 15 August 1907, with its head office in Parry's Building, Parry Corner, Madras.

In 1932 IB opened a branch in Colombo. It opened its second branch in Ceylon in 1935 at Jaffna, but closed it in 1939. IB next opened a branch in Rangoon, Burma, in late 1940s. Then in late 1941 IB opened branches in Singapore, Kuala Lumpur, Ipoh, and Penang. The exigencies of war forced IB to close its Singapore and Malayan branches with months. The closing of the Singapore branch resulted in little loss to IB; the loss of the branches in Malaya was much more costly.

World War II resulted in further financial problems for IB and it was forced in 1942 to close a number of its branches in India, and also its branch in Colombo.

=== Post Independence of India ===
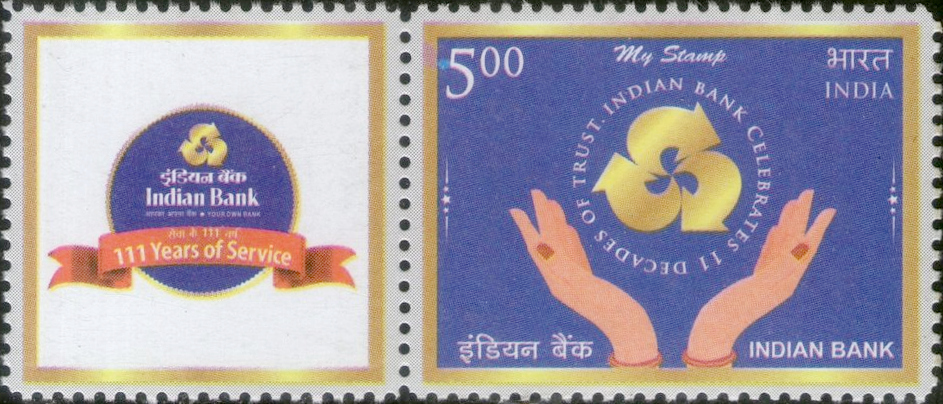
A 2017 stamp dedicated to the 111th anniversary of Indian Bank

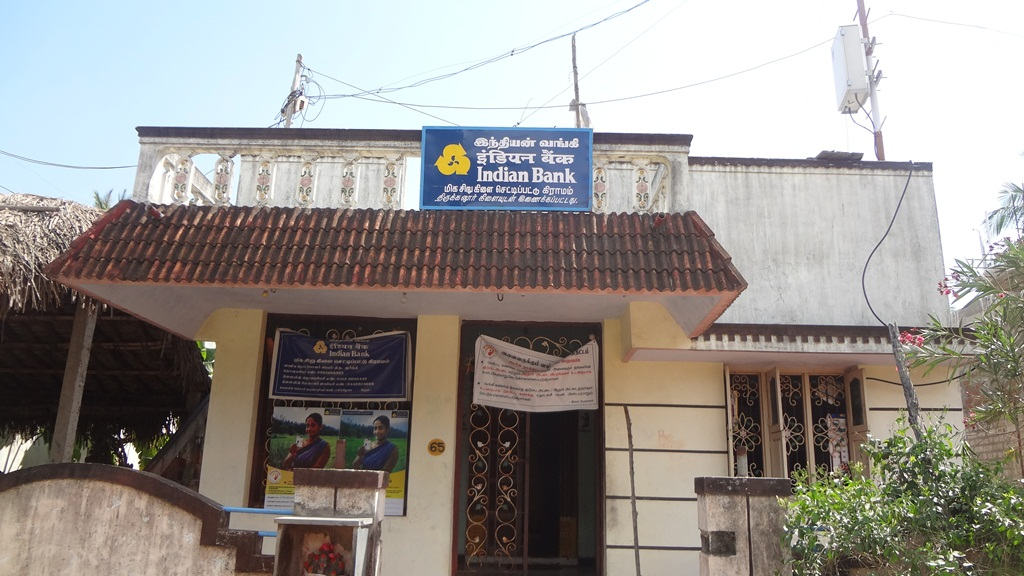
A branch of Indian Bank at Chettipet in Pondicherry

After the war, in 1947, it reopened its branch in Colombo. Indian Bank also reopened its branches in Burma, Malayan and Singapore, the last in 1962. The Burmese government nationalised all foreign banks, including Indian Bank's branch, in 1963.

The 1960s saw IB expand domestically as it acquired Rayalaseema Bank (est. 1939), Mannargudi Bank (est. 1932), Bank of Alagapuri, Salem Bank (est. 1925), and Trichy United Bank. Trichy United was the result of the 1965 merger of Woraiyur Commercial Bank (est. 1948), the Palakkarai Bank, and the Tennur Bank (est. 3 March,. These were all small banks with, the result that all the acquisitions added only about 38 branches to IB's network. Trichy United had five branches and its acquisition in 1967 brought the number of IB branches up to 210.

Then on 19 July 1969, the Government of India nationalised 14 top banks, including Indian Bank. One consequence of the nationalisation was that the Malaysian branches of nationalised Indian banks were forbidden to continue to operate as branches of the parent. At the time, Indian Bank had three branches, and Indian Overseas Bank, and United Commercial Bank had eight between them. In 1973, the three established United Asian Bank Berhad to amalgamate and take over their Malaysian operations. Post-nationalization, Indian Bank was left with only two foreign branches, one in Colombo and the other in Singapore.

International expansion resumed in 1978 with IB becoming a technical adviser to PT Bank Rama in Indonesia, the result of the merger of PT Bank Masyarakat and PT Bank Ramayana. Two years later, IB, Bank of Baroda, and Union Bank of India established IUB International Finance, a licensed deposit taker in Hong Kong. Each of the three banks took an equal share in the joint venture; IB's Chairman became the first Chairman of IUB International Finance. In May 1980s, IB also opened a foreign currency unit at its branch in Colombo.

In 1981 IB set up its first Regional Rural Bank, Sri Venkateswara Grameena Bank, in Chittoor.

=== Post nationalisation ===
In 1983, ethnic sectarian violence in the form of anti-Tamil riots resulted in the burning of Indian Overseas Bank's branch in Colombo. Indian Bank, which may have had stronger ties to the Sinhalese population, escaped unscathed.

In 1990, Indian Bank rescued Bank of Tanjore (Bank of Thanjavur; est. 1901), with its 157 branches, based in Tamil Nadu.

A multi-crore scam was exposed in 1992, when then chairman M. Gopalakrishnan lent ₹13 billion to small corporates and exporters from the south, which the borrowers never repaid.

Bank of Baroda bought out its partners in IUB International Finance in Hong Kong in 1998. Apparently this was a response to regulatory changes following Hong Kong's reversion to Chinese control. IUB became Bank of Baroda (Hong Kong), a restricted licence bank.

In June 2015, business of the bank crossed the milestone target of ₹3 lakh crore (US$32 billion).

=== Amalgamation ===
On 30 August, Finance Minister Nirmala Sitharaman announced that Allahabad Bank would be merged with Indian bank. The proposed merger would create the seventh largest public sector bank in the country with assets of ₹8.08 lakh crore (US$86 billion). The Union Cabinet approved the merger on 4 March 2020. Indian Bank assumed control of Allahabad Bank on 1 April, 2020.

Key Milestones

1907- The bank was incorporated on 5 March 1907, under the Indian Companies Act, 1882, as "Indian Bank Limited" and commenced operations on 15 August 1907.

1932 - The bank opened its Colombo branch.

1941 - The bank opened its Singapore branch

1962: The bank acquired the Rayalaseema Bank, the Bank of Alagapuri, the Salem Bank, the Mannargudi Bank and the Trichy United Bank

1969 - The bank was nationalized. It was appointed as the lead bank for nine districts in the States of Tamil Nadu, Andhra Pradesh and Kerala and the Union Territory of Pondicherry.

1970: The Head Office of the bank was shifted to its own building

1981 - The first regional rural bank sponsored by the bank, Sri Venkateswara Grameena Bank, was founded

1989: - Indian Bank Merchant Banking Services was incorporated as a subsidiary he kan0; Bank of Thanjavur Limited (with 157 branches) was amalgamated

1991 - India Bank Housing Limited was incorporated as a subsidiary

1994 - India fund Management Limited was established to manage the operations of Indian Bank Mutual Fund

2006-07 - The bank entered into a strategic alliance with Oriental Bank of Commerce and Corporation Bank

2012: Scheme of Amalgamation of M/s India Fund Management Limited, a wholly owned subsidiary of the bank with Indian Bank.

2020: - 1 April 2022, Indian Bank and Allahabad Bank merged. The oldest Joints Stock Bank in the country, Allahabad Bank, was founded on April 24 1865 by a group of Europeans at Allahabad, at a juncture when organized industries, trade and banking were taking shape in India. Thus, the history of the bank now spreads over three centuries.

Indian banks set the growth of personal loans: In India, the growth of personal loans is rapidly increasing, as per the report, and the new plan for the highest growth in the personal loan sector was set by the Reserve Bank of India (RBI).

== Regional Rural Bank ==
It sponsores two RRBs namely

- Puducherry Grama Bank
- Tamil Nadu Grama Bank

== See also ==
- Banking in India
- List of banks in India
- Reserve Bank of India
- Indian Financial System Code
- List of largest banks
- List of companies of India
- Make in India

== Cited sources ==
- Kumar, Ranjana (2008). A New Beginning: The Turnaround Story of Indian Bank. Tata McGraw-Hill Education. ISBN 978-0-07-024883-0.
