= Kottaiyur =

- Neighborhood/Suburb
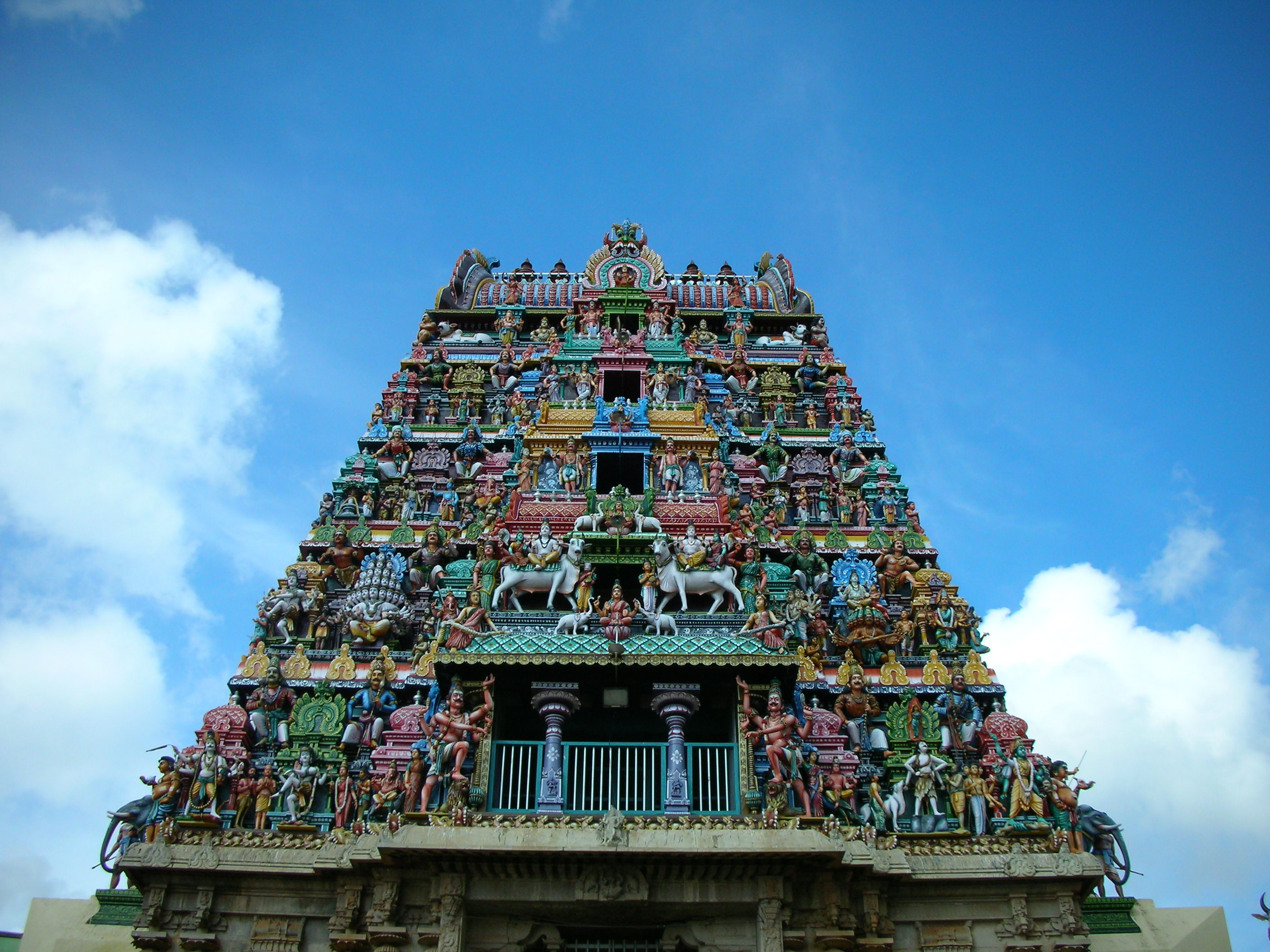
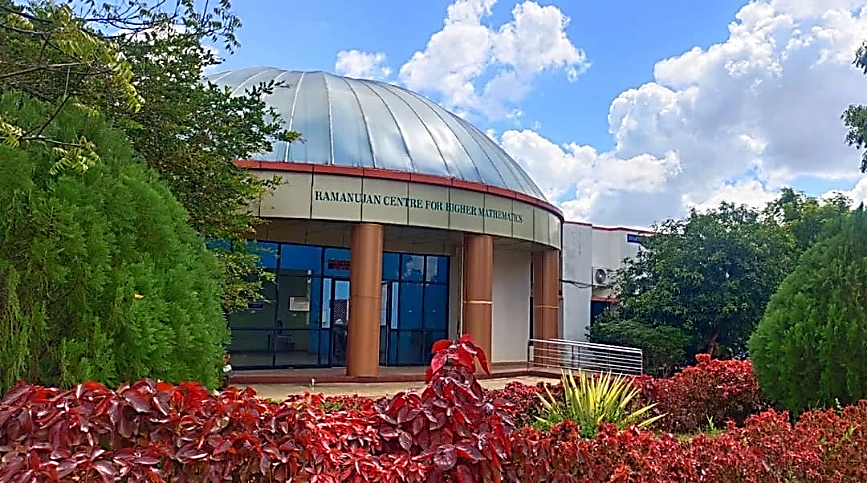
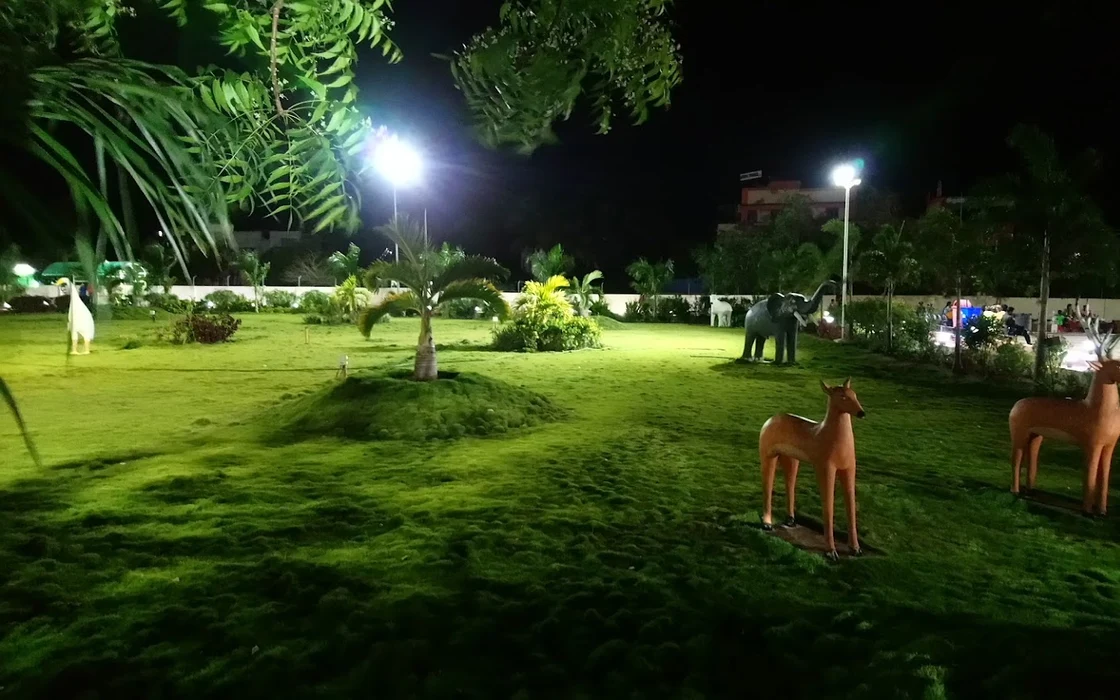
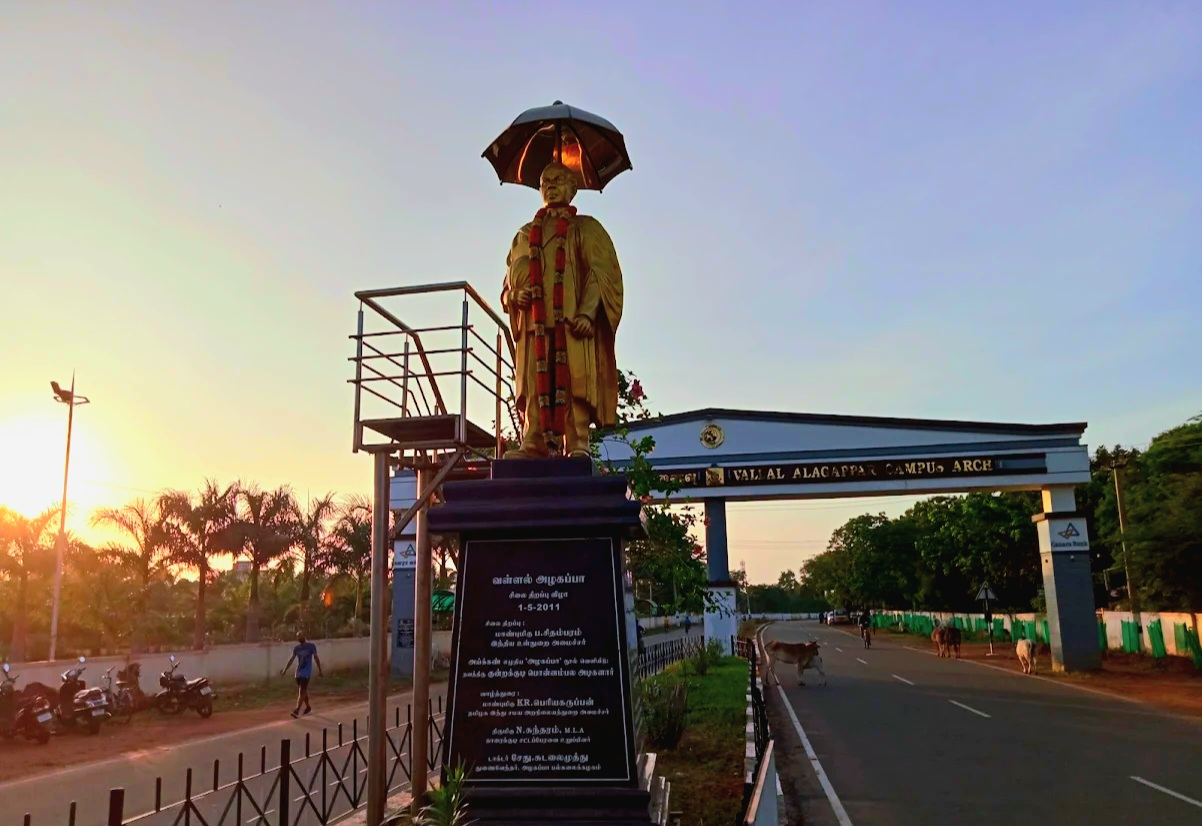
- Left to right: Kottaiyur Sivan Temple; Ramanujan Centre for Higher Mathematics, Alagappa Park; and Vallal Alagappa Arch
- Nickname: Chettinad
- Location in North Karaikudi, Tamil Nadu, India
- Coordinates: 10.115°N 78.791°E
- Country: India
- State: Tamil Nadu
- District: Sivaganga
- Named for: Palace and Fort like Karai Palatial Mansions

Government
  - Type: Municipal Corporation
  - Body: Karaikudi City Municipal Corporation

Area
  - Total: 6.75 km^{2} (2.61 sq mi)
- Elevation: 77 m (253 ft)

Population (2023)
  - Total: 50,164
  - Rank: 2nd in Karaikudi Metropolitan Area
  - Density: 7,430/km^{2} (19,200/sq mi)

Languages
  - Official: Tamil
- Time zone: UTC+5:30 (IST)
- PIN: 630106
- Telephone code: 91 4565

Kottaiyur is a Northern Neighborhood of Karaikudi city in Sivaganga district. Formerly, it was a Town panchayat until getting included into Karaikudi City Municipal Corporation. It's the most populous and a well-developed neighborhood or inner-core suburb of Karaikudi. It is known for its Kottaiyur Sivan Temple, one of the master pieces of the Chettinad region. The temple and the area's old lime stone heritage buildings give Kottaiyur a unique identity. Kottaiyur is well developed and famous for its reputed educational institutions. Kottaiyur panchayat administration including the villages of Velangudi and Alagapuri.

== Etymology ==
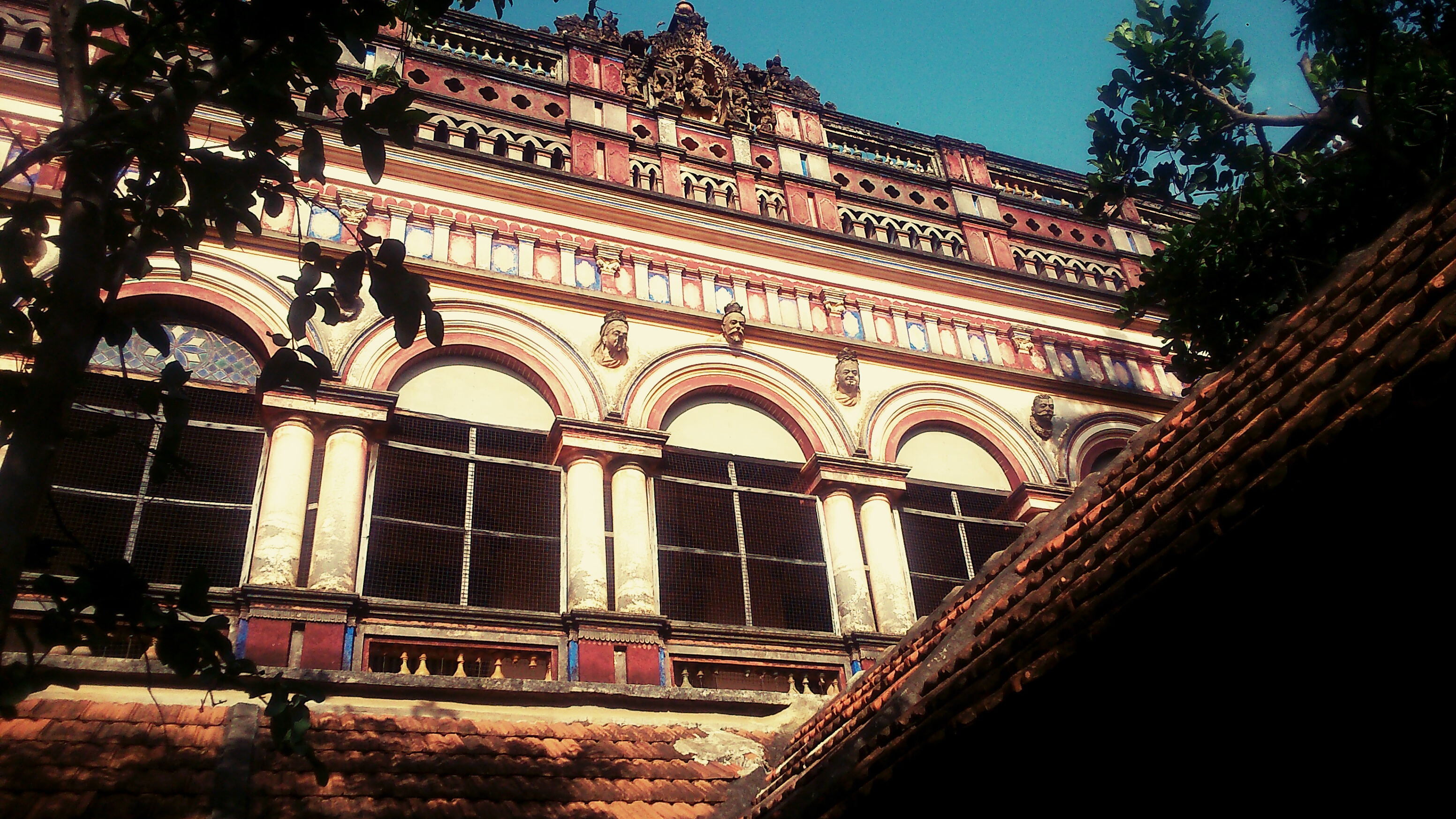
Kottaiyur Chettinad Architecture

The Town got its name from the Chettinad mansions, buildings and palaces which look like forts. In Tamil language, 'Kottai' means 'Fort' and 'Ur' means 'Town'.

== Geography ==
Kottaiyur has an average elevation of 77 metres (253 ft) and is located north in Karaikudi, on the Karaikudi-Trichy Highway. It's not on the highway per se, but on one of the routes that joins the highway after Kanadukathan.

== Demographics ==
As of the 2011 Indian census, Kottaiyur had a population of 14766 of which 49% was male and 51% female. The literacy rate of 75% is higher than the national average of 59.5%. Among men, the literacy rate is 79%, compared to 71% among females. 10% of the population is under six years of age.

== Suburban Areas and Villages ==
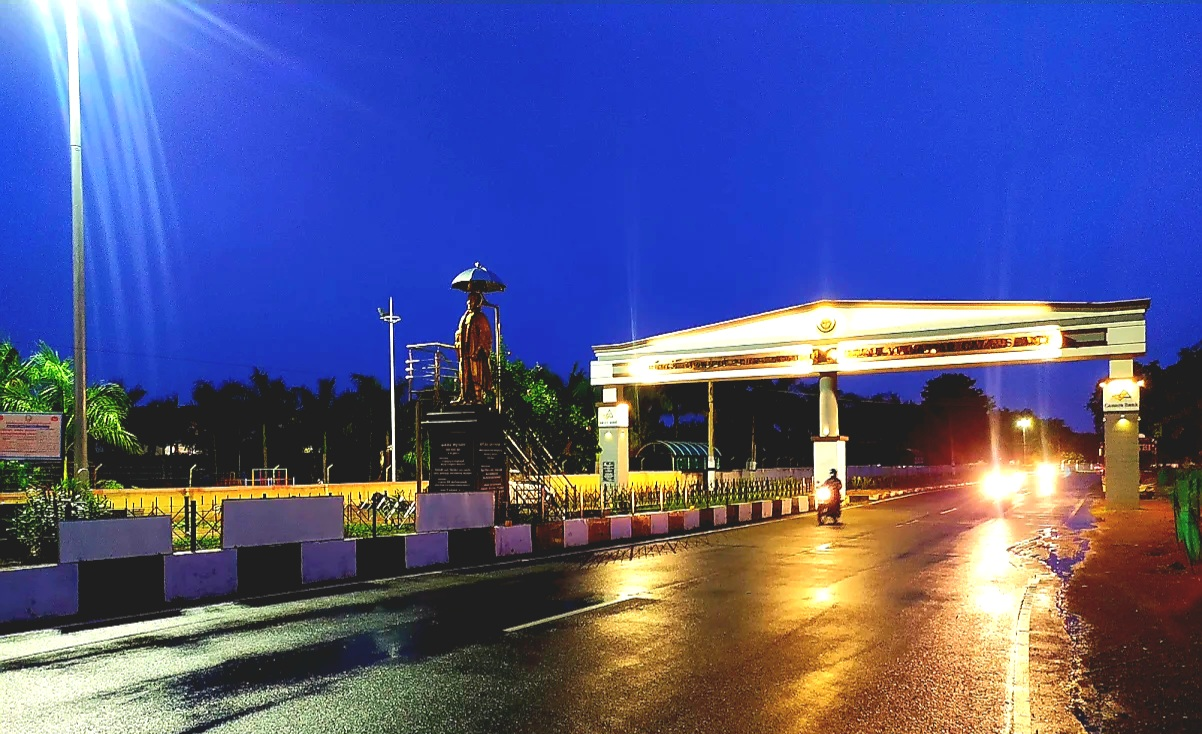
Rainy Evening at Kottaiyur Vallal Alagappar Arch

Kottaiyur comprises the following Suburban Areas:

1. Ezhil Nagar
2. Sriram Nagar
3. Pari Nagar
4. Udhayam Nagar

And, it comprises the following villages:

1. K. Alagapuri
2. K. Velangudi
3. K. Kallangudi

== Educational Institutions ==
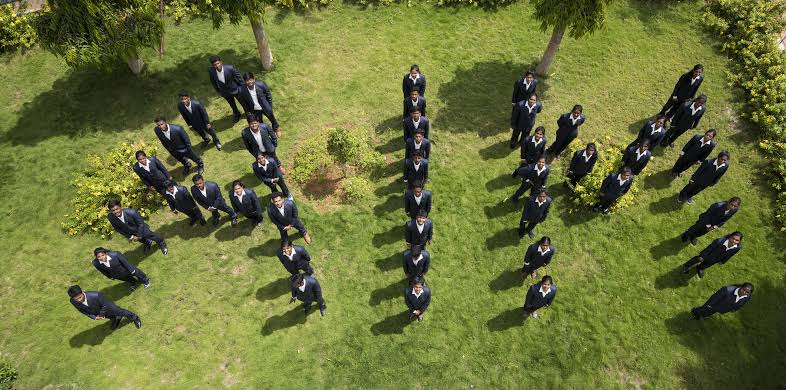
Alagappa Institute of Management students

Kottaiyur have well reputed schools and colleges around its town. Lot of students from near by surrounding villages and towns are studying here. Following are notable institutions

- Alagappa University (Partial) with its second entrance, Alagappa Chettiar statue and memorial arch.
  - Alagappa Institute of Management
  - Alagappa Institute of Physical Education
  - Alagappa Alumni Park
  - Ramanujan Centre for Higher Mathematics.
- Muthuiah Alagappa Matriculation Higher Secondary School.
- Chidambaram Chettiyar Girls Higher Secondary School.
- Thanjavur Arunachalam Chettiyar Government Higher Secondary School.
- Sanatana Dharma Vidyalaya Primary School.
- Kottaiyur Panchayat Union Middle School.

== Notable individuals ==
- Dr. Alagappa Chettiar, philanthropist and founder of Alagappa University.
- Roja Muthiah Chettiar
- A. K. Chettiar
- Sowmya Rajendran
