= Valliappan =

Valliappan is a surname. Notable people with the surname include:

- Reshma Valliappan (born 1980), Indian activist
- Soma Valliappan, Indian writer
