= Sanjai Gandhi =

Indian intellectual property attorney

Gandhi delivering a speech on World Intellectual property Day 2018

Sanjai Gandhi is an attorney at law specializing at intellectual property rights. Gandhi had been instrumental in getting protection under Geographical Indication (protection & Registration) Act, 1999 for more than 15 Geographical indications (GI) for the state of Tamil Nadu, India. The products for which IPR attorney Sanjai Gandhi has obtained GI protection are: Kancheepuram Silk Sarees, Bhavani Jamakkalam (bedsheet), Madurai Sungudi Saree, Salem White Silk, Kovai Cora Cotton, Arani Sari, Thanjavur Paintings, Thanjavur Dancing Doll, Ethomozhi Tall Coconut of Kanyakumari district and Tangaliya Shawl of Gujarat, Thanjavur Veenai, Mahabalipuram Stone Sculpture, Thirubuvanam Silk Sarees, Dindigul Locks, Srivilliputtur Palkova, Kandangi Saree, Arumbavur Wood Carving, and Thanjavur Pith Work.

Mr. Sanjai Gandhi has also received National Intellectual Property Award 2018 in the category of Top Individual / organization for Best facilitation of Registration of GI and Promotion of registered GI in India.

Mr. Sanjai Gandhi has also been appointed as the Nodal Officer for Tamil Nadu state's GI registry. Tamil Nadu is the only state in India to appoint a Nodal Officer for GI Registry even though the Union Ministry of Commerce had called upon all states to appoint such a Nodal Officer.

He has written a book in English titled Arts and Crafts of India: Registered GI Products. To spread awareness about IPRs, he has penned a book titled Intellectual Property in Tamil.
