= Lavjibhai Parmar =

Indian weaver artist

Lavjibhai Parmar is an Indian weaver artist who is a master of weaving called Tanglia. In 2025, the Government of India awarded him the Padma Shri for his contribution in the field of arts. He belongs to the Dangsia community.

== Work ==
Lavjibhai is recognized for their expertise of Tanglia art. He has been awarded the Padma Shri for persevering, promoting, and mentoring the younger generations in the 700-year-old traditional art of weaving. To ensure continuity onto this legacy, they established the Common Facility Centre, in which training is provided with technical and market support for trainees. 20-25 weavers are currently employed and opened livelihood avenues for others. To revive interest in this art form, they organized exhibitions and collaborated with vendors across India.

He is known as "Tangaliyano Tranhar (the savior of Tanglia). He has devoted more than 4 decades to this art.

In earlier times Tanglia was woven from sheep wool. As its consumption decreased, Lovejibhai's team made Tanglia in cotton. In which he made cushion covers, sarees, dresses.

== Tanglia weaving ==
In earlier times Tangalia woven garments made from sheep wool were used by shepherds, Rabari and Ahir communities. A Scheduled Tribe called Dangsia of Gujarat weaves this cloth. This 700-year-old art belongs to Surendranagar district of Saurashtra. Handloom garments such as Ramraj, Charmalia, Dhunsla and Lobdi are produced in Dedadara, Vastdi and Vadla villages.

Tangaliya Shawl has also got a geo tag.

== Awards ==
- 1990 - National Award for Contribution to the Arts
- 2019 - Sant Kabir Award
- In 2025, the Government of India awarded him the Padma Shri for his contribution in the field of arts.
