= Chettinad =

Region in Tamil Nadu, India

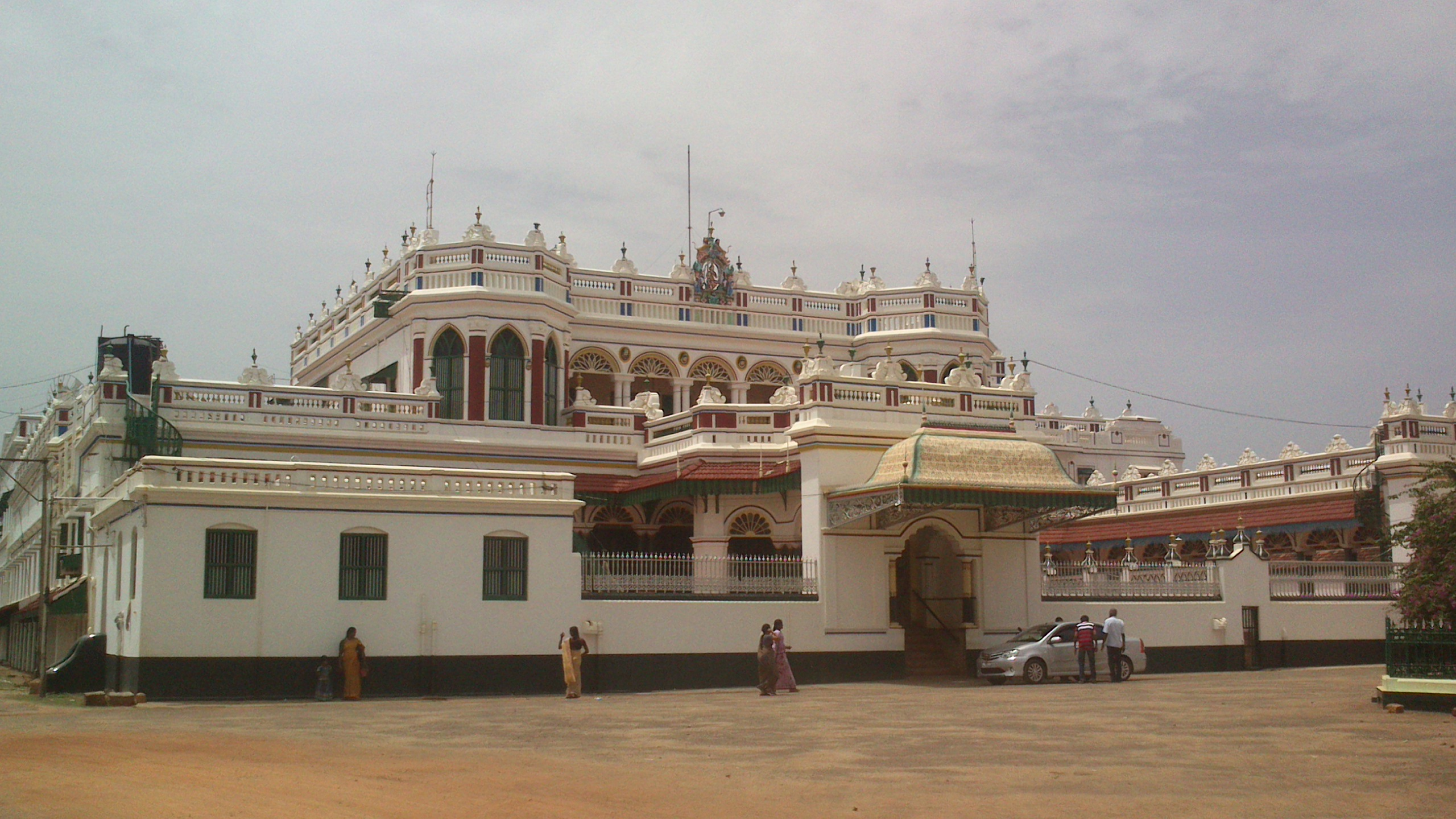
The Heritage Palace, Chettinad

Chettinad (also known as Chettinadu) is a region in Tamil Nadu comprising 56 villages in Sivaganga district and 20 villages in Pudukottai district, which was historically ruled by the Ramnad kingdom of Pandya Nadu. It has a small portion extending into the Pudukottai District in Tamil Nadu; Karaikudi is the major city of this area and is considered the urban centre for the Chettinadu villages.

== Etymology ==
The name chettinad(u) comes from 2 Tamil words Chettiar and Nadu. Chettiar refers to a specific community of traders, Landlords people and Nadu means land. Collectively called as "land of the Chettiars".

== Demography ==
In the 19th and early 20th centuries, many residents of Chettinad were trading in South and Southeast Asia, particularly Burma, Ceylon, Vietnam and Malaysia. By 2010, only 74 villages remained of the original 96, organised in clusters spread over a territory of 1,550 square kilometres (600 square miles) in the districts of Sivagangai and Pudukottai in the State of Tamil Nadu. It finds itself in the UNESCO nomination for palatial house sites of historic and cultural value. It is located on National Highway 536 between Trichy and Karaikudi which is approximately 10kms away from this place.

== Community ==
Chettinad is the home of the Nattukottai Chettiars (Nagarathar), a prosperous banking and business community and for high hierarchy, non-Brahmin Vallambar feudal community with an aristocrat title Nattar - Ambalam. It is also known for its local cuisine, architecture, and religious temples.

=== Chettinad cuisine ===
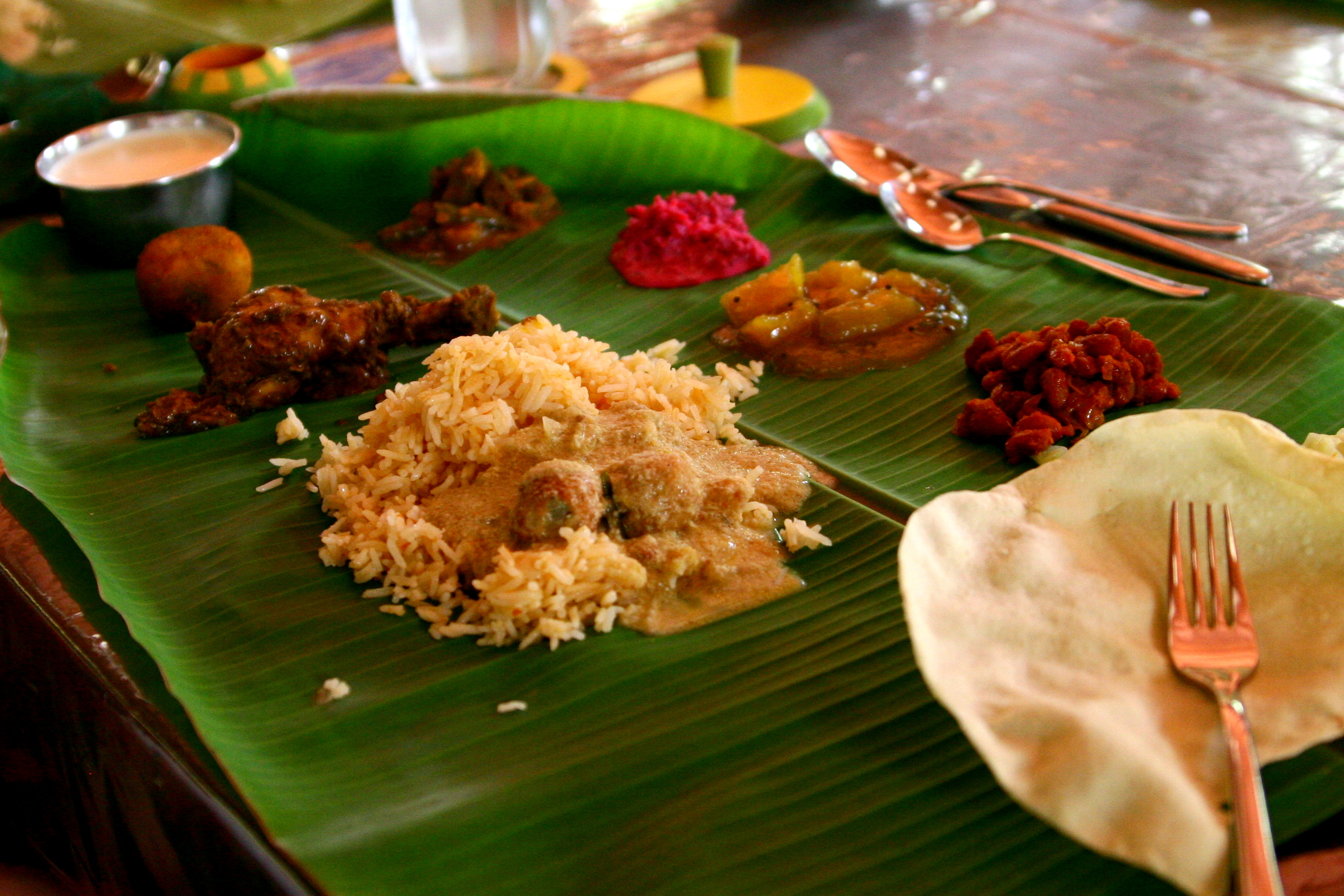
Chettinad cuisine

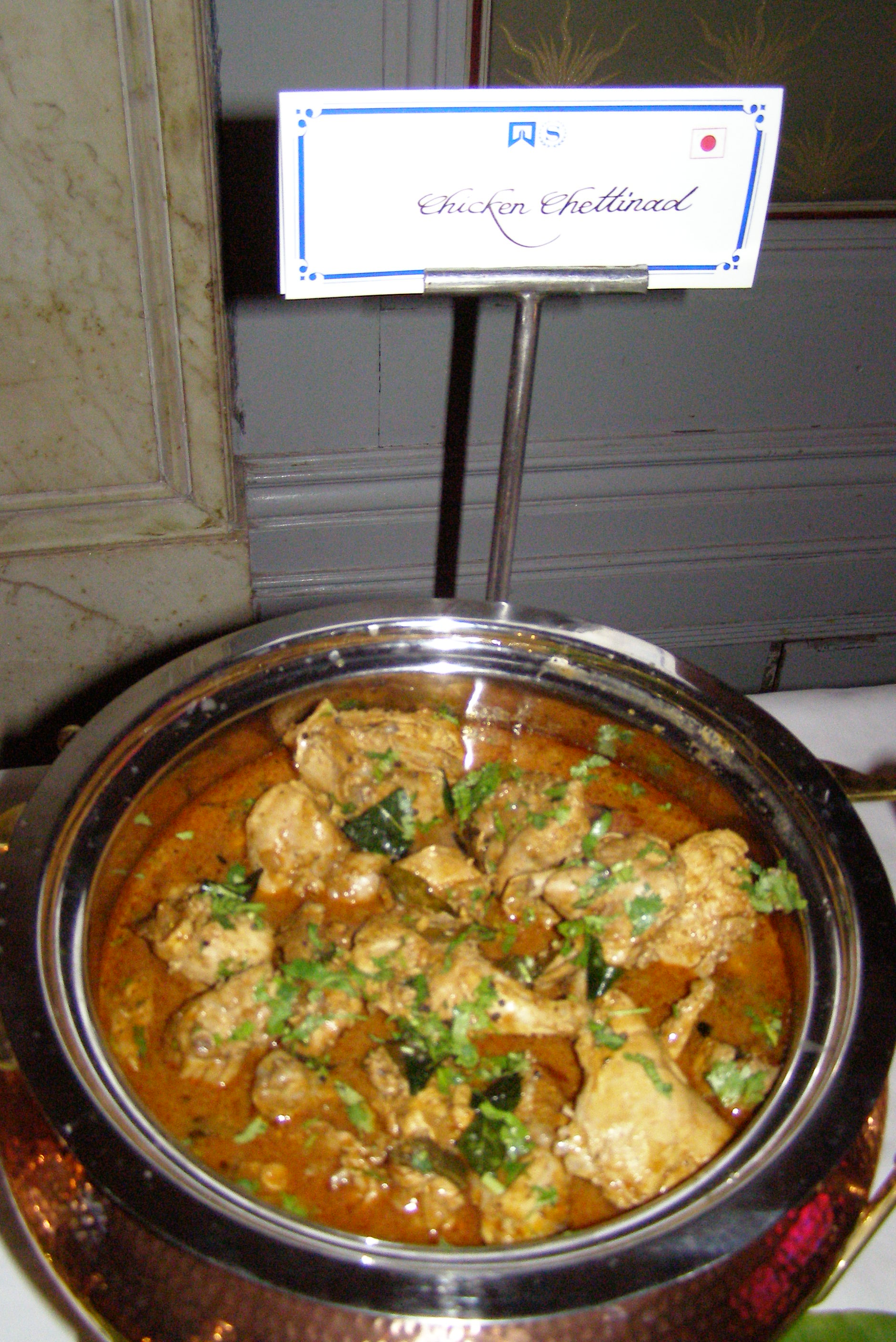
Chicken Chettinad, a popular dish from the region

The word "Chettiar" refers to the social caste of mercantile bankers. The Chettiars are known to be traders in salt and spices and this is reflected in the Chettinad cuisine. Meals also consist of cooked lentils, Brinjal curry, drumstick sambar, ghee for flavouring rice, and sweet meals like payasam and paal paniyaram. Some well-known local dishes are Chicken Chettinad (spicy chicken curry), Vegetable Chettinad (a vegetable curry) and dishes featuring seafood.

=== Architecture ===
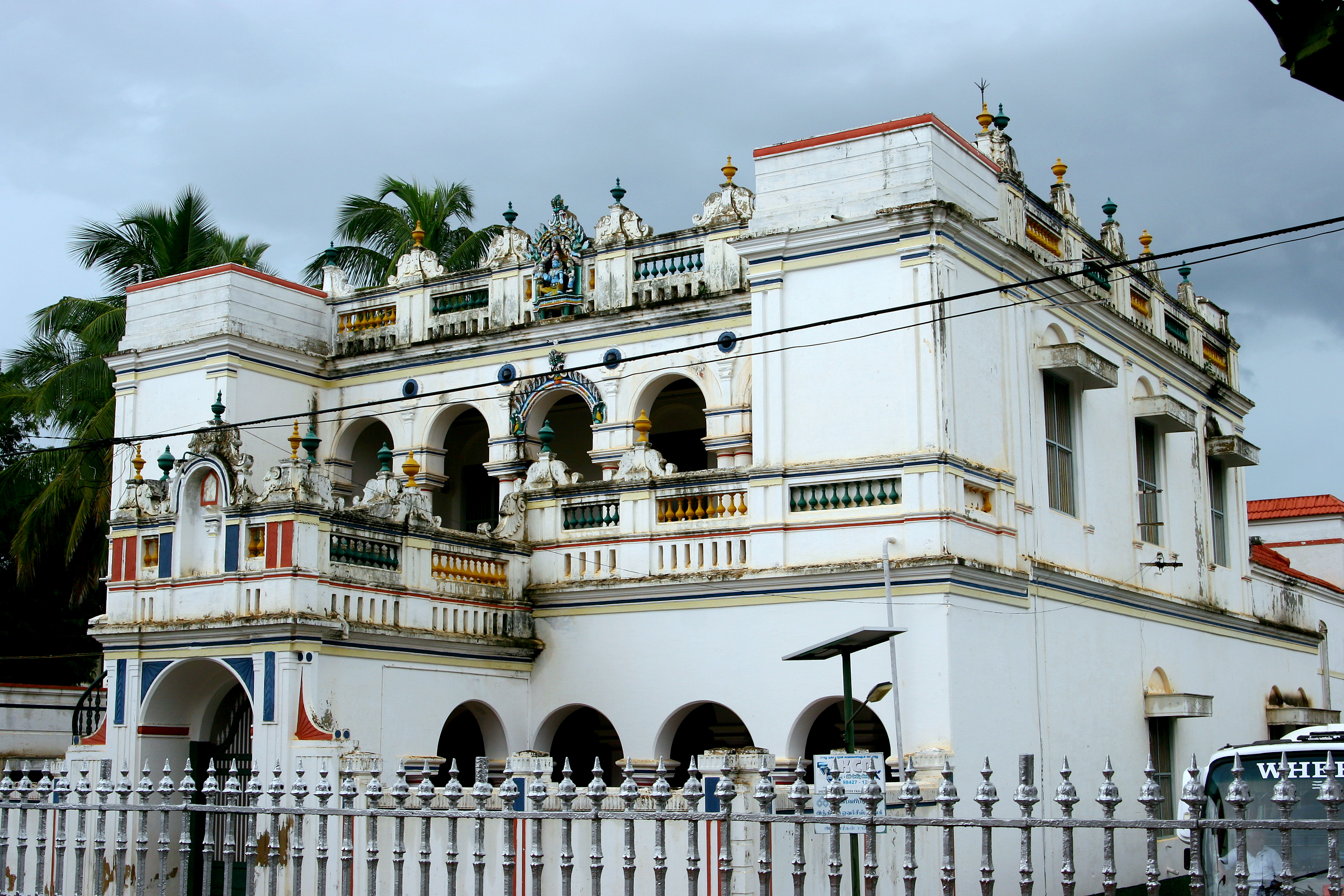
A palatial house in Chettinad

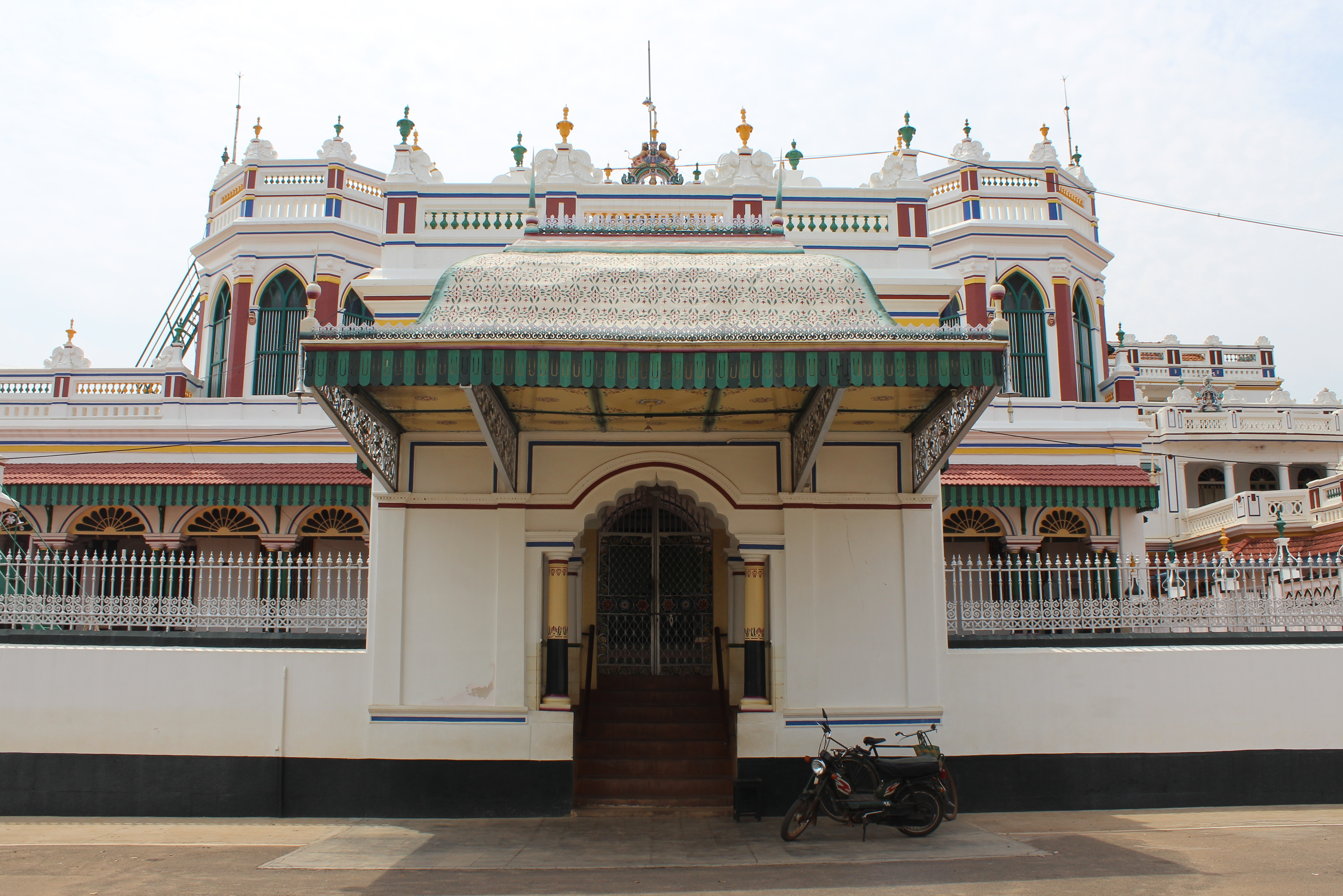
Kanadukathan Chettinadu Palace entrance

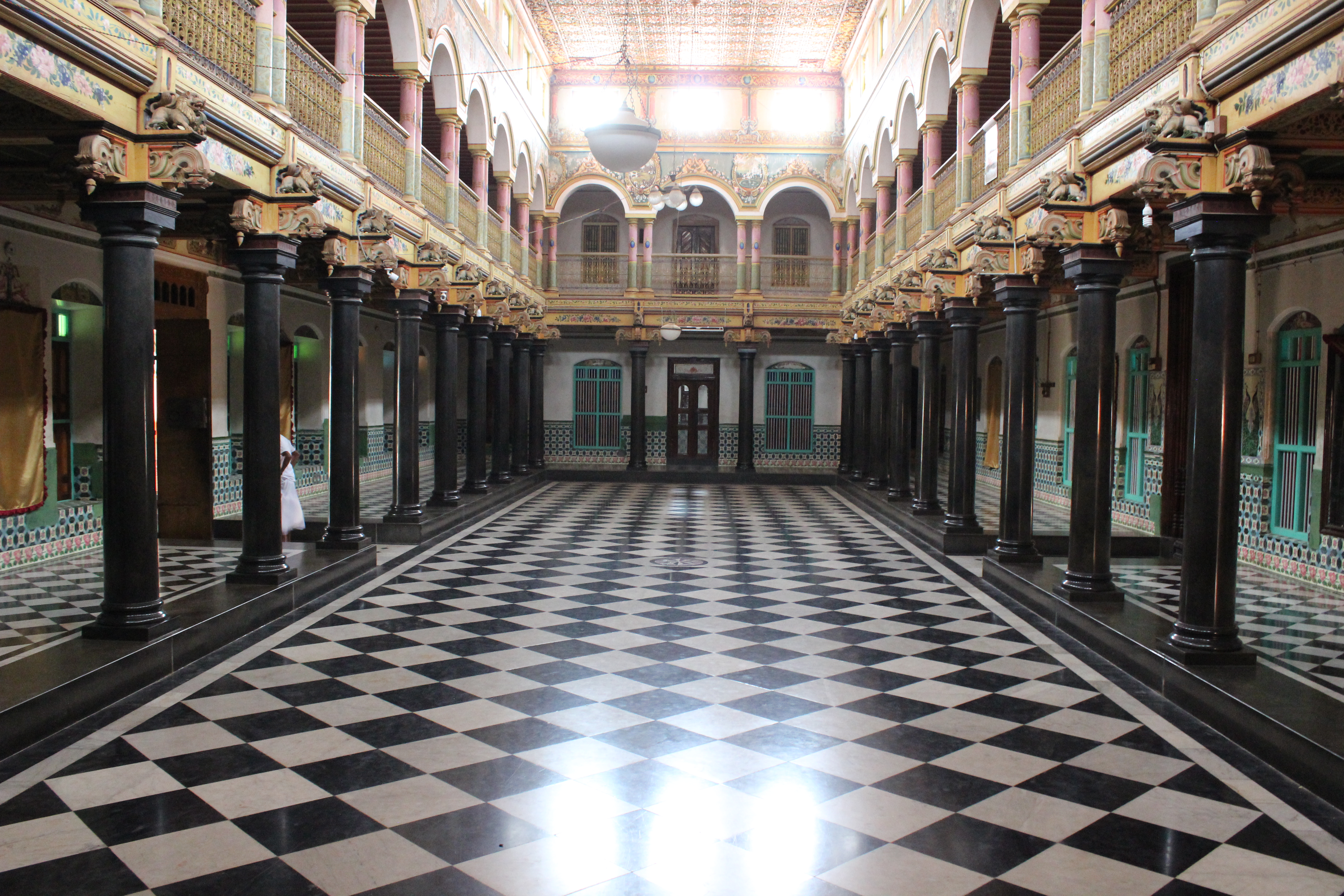
Inside of a typical Chettinadu house

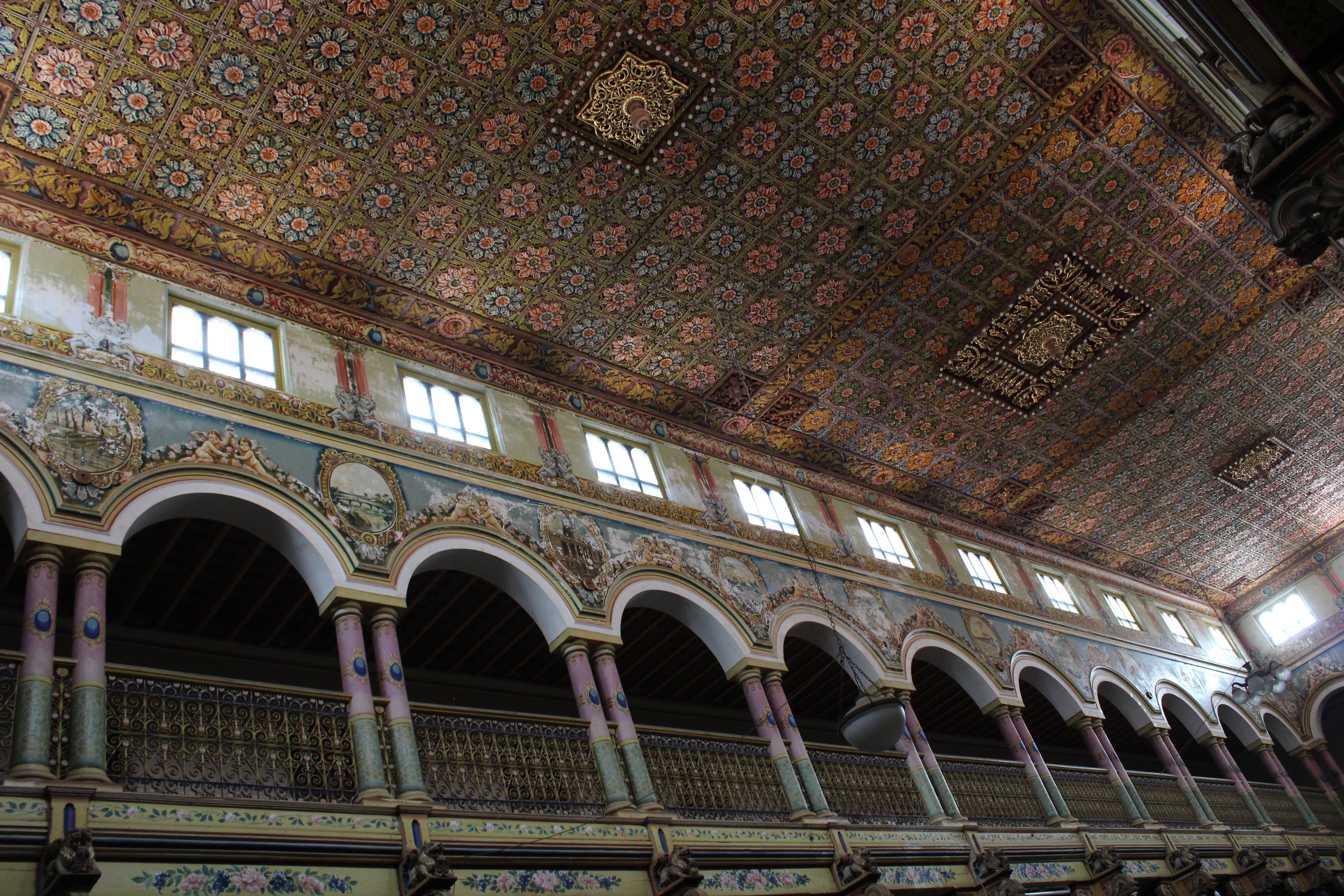
Rooftop of a typical Chettinadu house

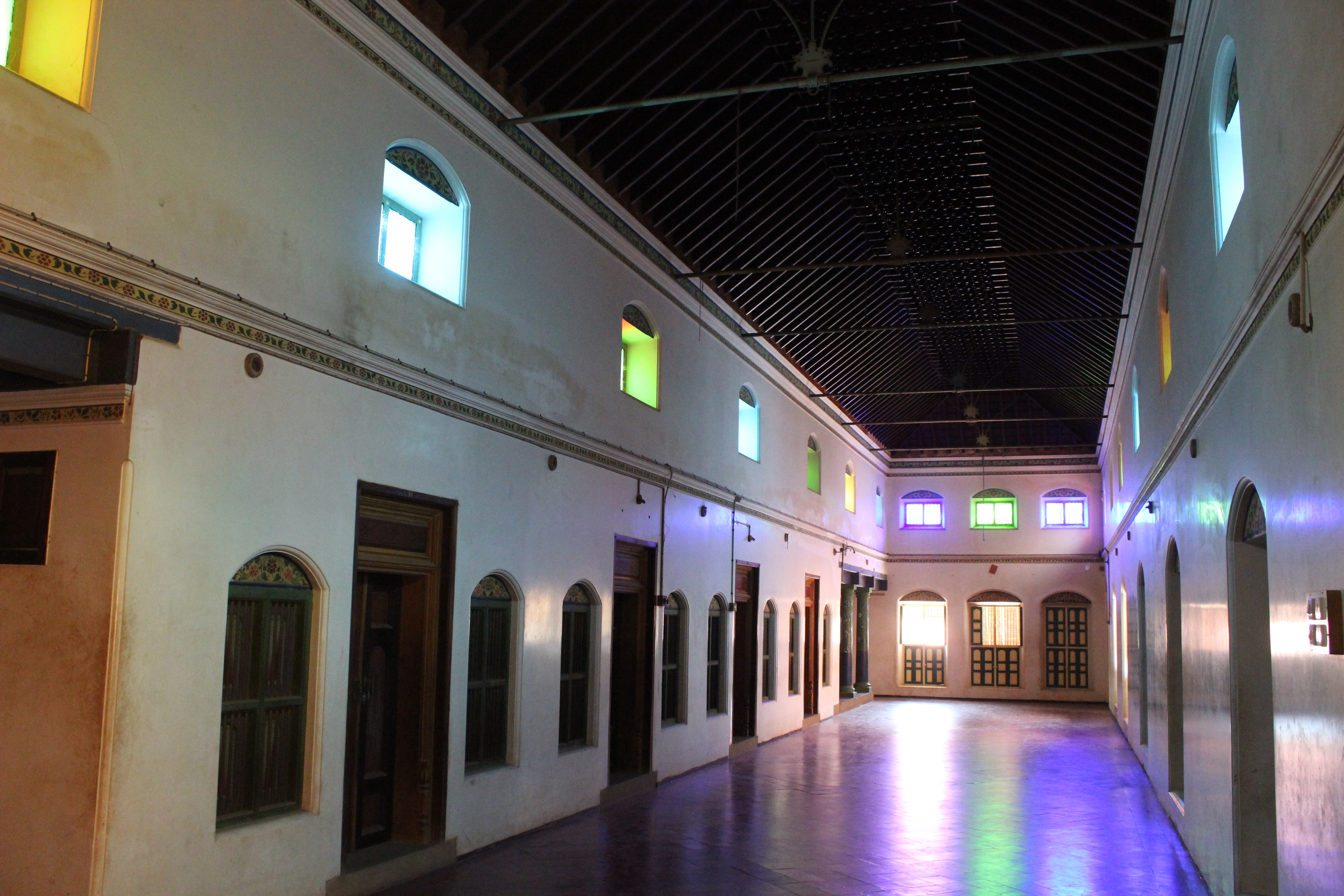
Dining hall inside a Chettinadu house

The Chettinad region is well known for its 19th-century mansions, whose wide courtyards and spacious rooms are embellished with marble and teak. Construction materials, decorative items, and furnishings were mostly imported from East Asian countries and Europe. The marble was brought from Italy, chandeliers and teak from Burma, crockery from Indonesia, crystals from Europe and wall-to-wall mirrors from Belgium.

Many of these mansions were built using a type of limestone known as karai. According to locals the mansion walls were polished with a paste made out of egg whites and palm sugar to give them a smooth texture and for their cooling qualities.

=== Temples ===
Originally built by early Tamil dynasties like the Cholas, the temples of Chettinad stand testimony to the spiritual beliefs of local people. Temples are built according to Vaastu Shastras and Agamas as the Chettinad wealthy sponsored the buildings and the shilpis after the royal families declined. On a side note, traditional houses were also built according to ancient text in an architectural style called Vaastu Shastras.

Each temple has its own tank called oorani where water lilies are grown and used for holy rituals. Even today, much of Chettinad's daily activities are centered around the festivities of the temple. Among the many famous temples are: Vairavan Kovil, Iraniyur, Karpaga Vinayakar, Kundrakudi Murugan, Kottaiyur Sivan, and Kandanur Sivan temples, with each having its own unique deity.

Vinayagar Chathurthi is celebrated every year, on the day when the two stars Shasti and Sadhayam mingle together. This day typically falls as the 22nd day after Periya Karthigai. Pillaiyar Nonmbu, its name, is usually in the month of December. On this day, they sing songs of the deity Lord Vinayagar and then take a sweet called Ellai.

== Local crafts ==
=== Sari ===
The cotton sari, also known as kandaangi, is unique in its dramatic patterns and colours. Its vibrance and weight are its distinguishing factors. Records and old photographs show the use of sari by previous generations, before the advent of blouses and underskirts, and thus worn rather differently from the typical contemporary sari. At present, it is available in Kundi.

=== Athangudi tiles ===
Athangudi tiles, named after the place of the manufacture in Chettinad, come in a myriad of colours and patterns, and are made by a unique process using local soil and glass plates. These tiles are a testament to the rich cultural heritage of the Chettiar community, who effectively adapted many influences to their own brand of local craftsmanship. The designs and colours used in Athangudi tiles are still those of a bygone era. However, of late, new designs and patterns are being incorporated.

The Athangudi tiles are hand-made. However, with a short shelf life and relatively slow manufacturing process, these tiles are not much in demand. The situation has led to the decline in the market.

== Industry ==
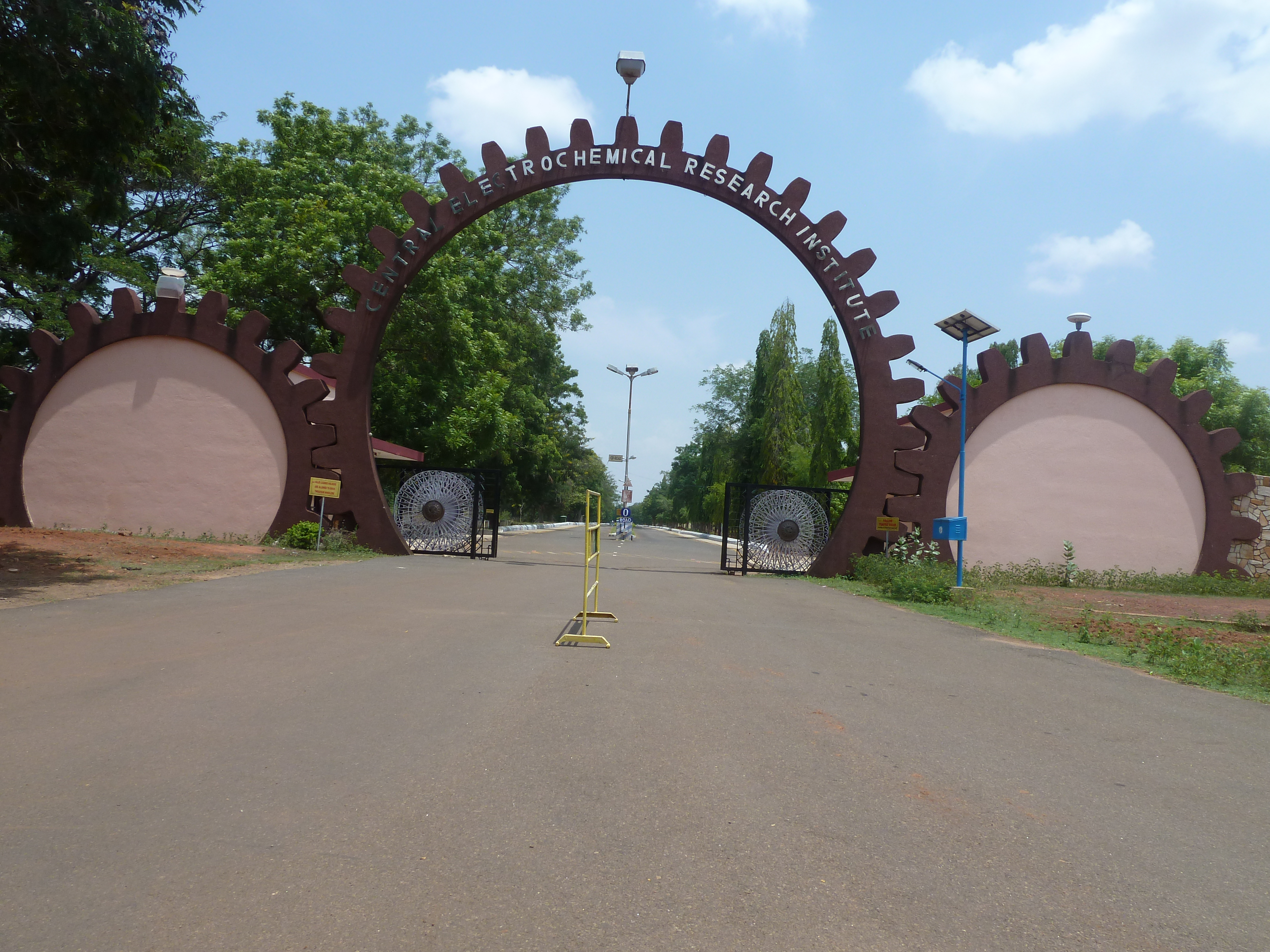
CECRI entrance.

Chettinad's principal town, Karaikudi is also the location of a branch of the Central Electro Chemical Research Institute (CECRI), one of the forty national laboratories under the aegis of the Council of Scientific and Industrial Research (CSIR) in New Delhi. The CSIR lab specialises in electro-chemical research and has been operational for more than fifty years. The campus is on over 300 scenic acres (120 ha), filled with traditional and ornamental vegetation. CECRI conducts four-year Engineering and Technology courses in chemical and electro-chemical engineering and technology affiliated with the Anna University in Chennai.

== Travel ==
The nearest airports are Madurai International Airport and Tiruchirappalli International Airport while the largest towns in the area are Karaikudi and Devakottai.

Chettinad has its own railway station, but expresses don't stop here. The only halting train is the thrice daily MEMU train running from Tiruchirapalli to Virudhunagar connecting Pudukottai, Karaikudi, Devakottai, Sivaganga, Manamadurai and Aruppukottai with Chettinad station. All the trains running in the Chennai-Tiruchirapalli-Manamadurai Section stop at Karaikudi. Karaikudi Junction railway station is the nearest major station.There are also frequent town buses connecting Chettinad to Karaikudi, Ponnamaravathy, Devakottai Pudukkottai and Aranthangi.

== Agriculture college ==
The Tamil Nadu Agriculture University established a Dryland Agriculture Research Station (DARS) in Chettinad which was later upgraded to Agriculture College and Research Institute. It has a total of 450 acres (182 ha) of Farmland adopted for Research and Education. It houses a Centre of Excellence in Dryland Farming (CEDF) and a Food Processing Research and Training Centre (FPRTC). The college currently offers an Undergraduate Course of Bachelor of science Honours in Agriculture.

== Notable people ==
- Alagappa Chettiar - founder of the various educational institutions in Karaikudi and its surroundings. Alagappa University, Alagappa Chettiar College of Engineering and Technology, and Alagappa Government Arts College are a few institutes named in his honour.
- Annamalai Chettiar - founder of Indian Bank and the Annamalai University bears his name.
- Muthiah Chettiar
- S. Rm. Muthiah Chettiar
- M. A. M. Muthiah
- M. A. M. Ramaswamy
- M. A. Chidambaram
- P. Chidambaram - former Finance Minister of India.
- Kaviarasar Kannadasan - Tamil poet.
- Justice A. R. Lakshmanan (b. 1942) - former judge of the Supreme Court of India and current chairman of the Law Commission of India.
- Lena Chettiar
- A. V. Meiyappan - founder of AVM Productions, the oldest and largest film production studio in Kollywood, the Tamil language film industry of India.
- Hari Sevugan
- Rama Narayanan, film director and producer
- Sp Muthuraman, film director and producer
- Vasanth, director
- Soma Valliappan
