= Who Owns That Song =

2018 book by A. R. Venkatachalapathy

- First edition (publ. Juggernaut Books)
- Author: A. R. Venkatachalapathy
- Publication date: 2018

Who Owns that Song? The Battle for Subramania Bharati's Copyright is a 2018 non-fiction book written by Indian historian A. R. Venkatachalapathy. It explains the background of the nationalisation of the works of Indian poet Subramania Bharati.
