= Alagappa Chettiar =

Indian businessman and philanthropist (1909 – 1957)

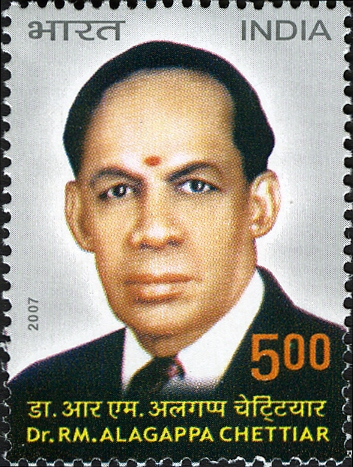
- Chettiar on a 2007 stamp of India
- Born: Alagappa Chettiar; 6 April 1909; Kottaiyur, (Sivagangai District) Madras Presidency, British India (in present-day Tamil Nadu, India)
- Died: 5 April 1957 (aged 47); Vepery, Madras, Tamil Nadu, India
- Occupations: Businessman, philanthropist
- Spouse: Mathushri Lakshmi
- Awards: Padma Bhushan

Sir Alagappa Chettiar (6 April 1909 – 5 April 1957) was an Indian businessman and philanthropist. He was awarded the Padma Bhushan, the third-highest civilian award in India, in 1956.

== Early life ==
Chettiar was born in Kottaiyur in the Sivaganga District of Tamil Nadu to Kumaraswamy Valayapalayam Aiyah Lakshmana Ramanathan Chettiar and Umayal Achi in India. He attended Presidency College in Chennai, where he befriended Sarvepalli Radhakrishnan, a teacher who later became the President of India. In 1930, at the age of 21, he was the first person from the Nattukottai Nagarathar community to earn a M.A. degree in English Language and Literature.

After graduation, he began legal studies in England and qualified for the Bar at Middle Temple, London, in 1933. He became a 'Bar-at-Law' in Chettinad, India. During that time, he earned a pilot's certificate in Croydon, London, and was the first Indian to be trained at Standard Chartered Bank, London.

== Business career ==
Chettiar's business activities were recognized by the British Government when he was knighted in the 1946 New Year Honours at the age of 37. He renounced the title of knighthood when India attained independence. On 26 January 1956, the President of India conferred the Padma Bhushan on him.

Chettiar began his career in textiles. In 1937 he started Cochin Textiles, later Alagappa Textiles at Alagappa Nagar near Thrissur in Kerala. The township for Cochin textile staff was named "Alagappa Nagar". He also invested in rubber plantations, tin mines, textile mills, insurance companies, hotels, theatres, a stock exchange, and a private airline.

== Philanthropy ==
Chettiar supported educational initiatives, including a donation of 100,000 rupees to the Tamil Department of Travancore University in 1943.

In 1947, at the Annie Besant centenary celebrations, a proposal was made to establish an arts college in Karaikudi to support educational development in India. This led to the establishment of Alagappa Arts College, which opened three days later at Gandhi Maleghai. Subsequent financial contributions supported the creation of a number of educational institutions, which formed the basis for the foundation of the Alagappa University in 1985 by the Government of Tamil Nadu.

He encouraged Prime Minister Jawaharlal Nehru to locate one of the Government's National Research Institutes on the Alagappa campus. At the inauguration of the Central Electro Chemical Research Institute (CECRI) on 14 January 1953, then-Vice President of India Sarvepalli Radhakrishnan stated:

The magnificent gift of 300 acres of land and fifteen lakhs of rupees by Alagappa Chettiar helped the Government of India to select Karaikudi as the seat of the Electro Chemical Research Institute. Being a businessman himself, Dr. Alagappa Chettiar is aware of the industrial possibilities of our country and the need for scientific, technical and technological education. In his lifetime, he has built a monument for himself, and you have only to look around.

Alagappa Chettiar was the founder of the A.C. College of Technology in Guindy. The college, now a constituent of Anna University, offers specialized courses in fields including chemical engineering, petroleum refining & petrochemicals, textile engineering, leather technology, industrial biotechnology, ceramic technology, pharmaceutical technology, and food technology. Chettiar also donated his residence in Kottaiyur to start a women's college.

=== Notable donations and institutions ===
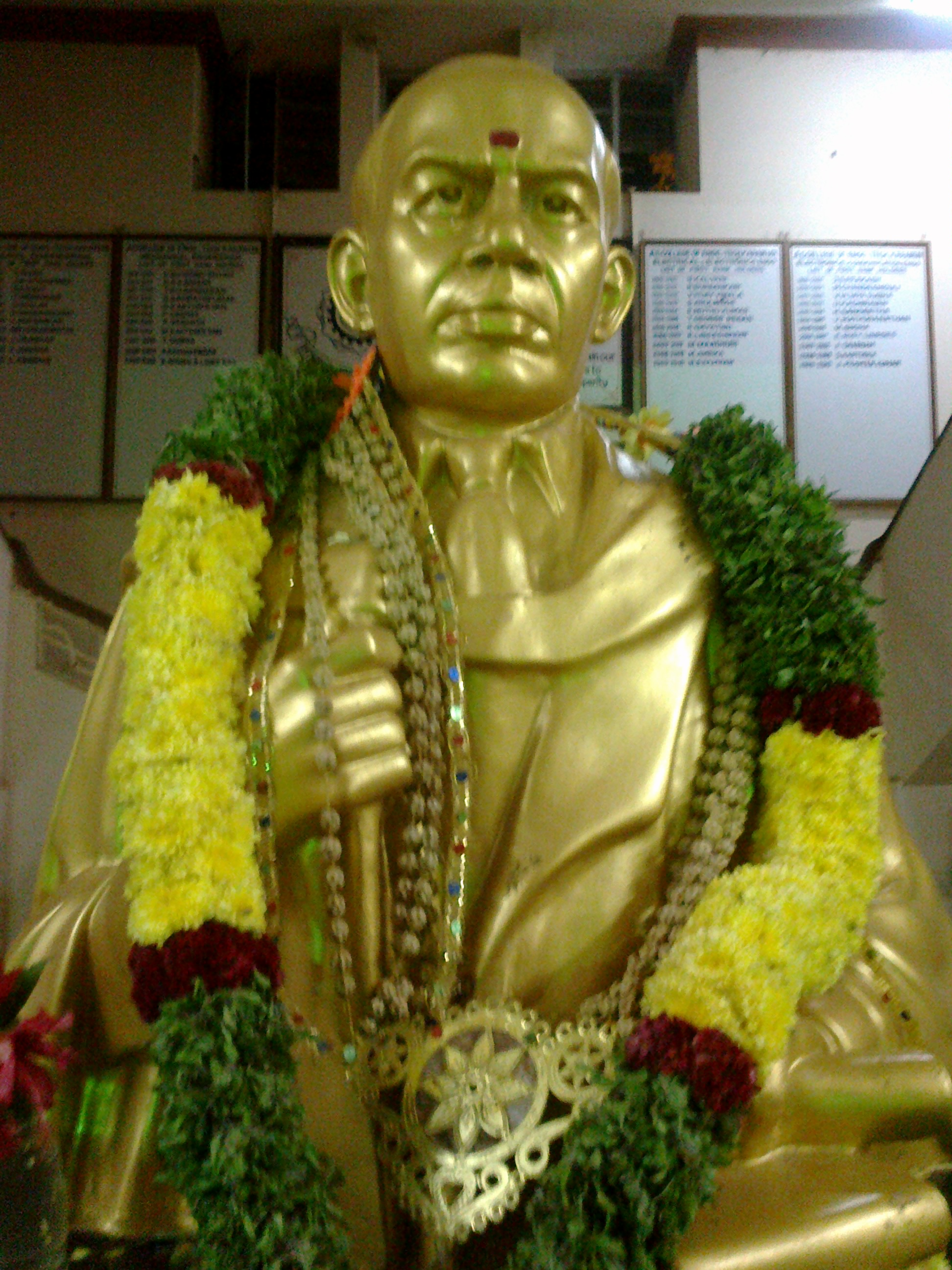
Dr. Alagappa Chettiar

His other foundations and charitable donations included:

- Alagappa Chettiar College of Technology, (Now known as Alagappa College of Technology Campus - Anna University, Chennai)
- Alagappa Chettiar Government College of Engineering & Technology (ACCET) at Karaikudi, Tamil Nadu (Now an autonomous government institution)
- Alagappa Matriculation Higher Secondary School, Chennai, Tamil Nadu
- Alagappa Arts College, Karaikudi, Tamil Nadu
- Alagappa College of Polytechnic, Karaikudi, Tamil Nadu
- Alagappa Physical Education College, Karaikudi, Tamil Nadu
- Alagappa Primary School, Karaikudi, Tamil Nadu
- Alagappa Montessori School, Karaikudi, Tamil Nadu
- Alagappa Preparatory School, Karaikudi, Tamil Nadu (this is a private school managed by his daughter founded after him)
- Alagappa Matriculation School, Karaikudi, Tamil Nadu (this is a private school managed by his daughter founded after him)
- Alagappa Model Higher Secondary School at his birthplace, Karaikudi, Tamil Nadu
- A ladies' hostel at Vepery, Chennai
- A gift for the development of the township infrastructure of Kottaiyur
- A gift for the Meenakshi club at Kandanur, Tamil Nadu
- A donation for the H.M.I.S Fund
- Foundation of an engineering college at Annamalai University, Chidambaram, Tamil Nadu
- Foundation of a college of technology at Madras University, subsequently named Alagappa Chettiar College of Technology, Guindy, Chennai
- A donation to establish higher education in Malaysia
- A donation to establish the South Indian Educational Society in New Delhi in 1948
- A donation to the Lady Doak College at Madurai
- A donation for constructing "Alagappa Mandapam" at Thakkar Baba Vidyalaya in 1946 – the Foundation Stone was laid by M.K.Gandhi
- A donation for publishing Tamil Kalangiyam
- A donation to the Cochin Cyclone Relief fund
- A donation for geological research by the Travancore government
- A donation for establishing a maternity hospital and childcare centre in Cochin
- A donation for indigenous medicine research by Ernakulam Maharaja College
- A donation to fund students from Cochin to study abroad
- Funding the morning food scheme for Cochin children
- Establishing the South Indian chamber of commerce in Cochin

== Illness and death ==
Chettiar was treated for cancer in 1955. After a brief recovery, his health worsened, and he died on 5 April 1957 at his residence in Vepery, Madras (now Chennai).
