= Attangudi =

Village in Sivaganga, Tamil Nadu, India

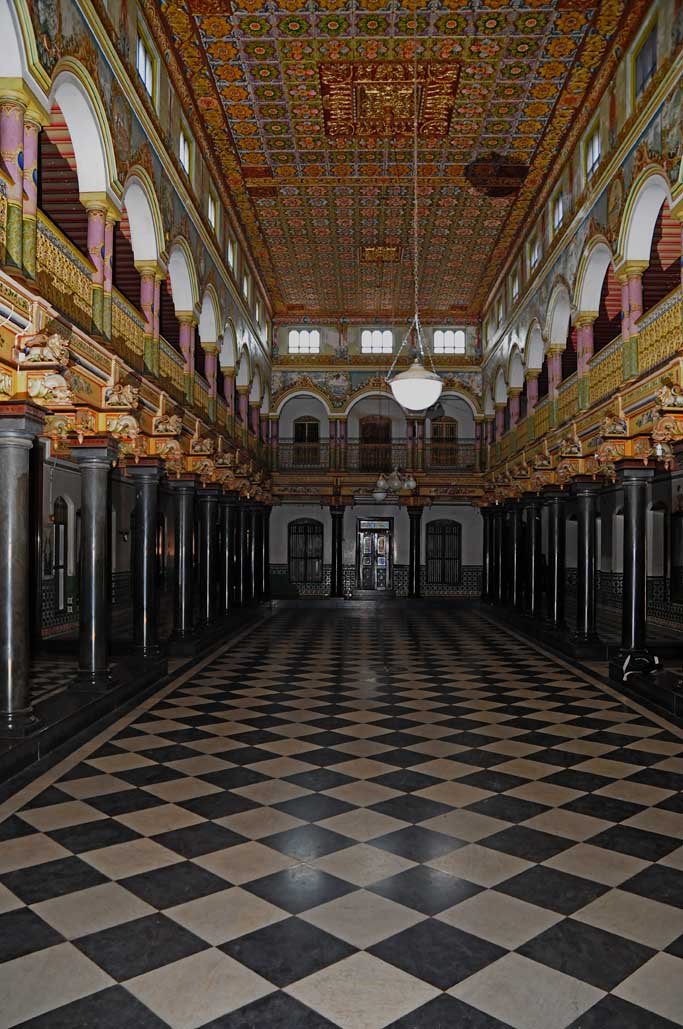
Palace in Athangudi

Attangudi or Athangudi is a village in Sivaganga District, in Tamil Nadu, India. The village has a population of about 2,000 inhabitants and is mainly known for Chettinad furniture, tiles, and various foods.

The place is known for its floor tiles called "Athangudi tiles". The tiles are handmade and have traditional patterns and design. The tiles are durable and eco-friendly.

Attangudi lies within the Chettinad traditional area. The people of the area learned the art of tile-making and made a trademark of their own in Athangudi. A majority of families in the village are involved in tile production.
