= A. R. Venkatachalapathy =

Indian academic (born 1967)

- Born: 30 September 1967 (age 59)
- Citizenship: Indian
- Education: University of Madras; Madurai Kamaraj University, Jawaharlal Nehru University
- Occupation: Professor at Madras Institute of Development Studies.
- Writing career
- Language: Tamil
- Subject: Literature
- Notable work: Tirunelveeli Ezucciyum Vaa. Vuu.ci. Yum 1908
- Notable awards: Sahitya Akademi Award (2024)
- Website: www.mids.ac.in/venkatachalapathy/

A.R. Venkatachalapathy is an Indian historian, author and translator who writes and publishes in Tamil and English. Currently he is a professor at the Madras Institute of Development Studies (MIDS). He is noted for collecting and publishing the works of Tamil writer Pudhumaipithan.

== Early life ==
Venkatachalapathy was born on 30 September 1967.

== Education ==
Venkatachalapathy obtained his B.Com degree from University of Madras in 1987 and his MA in History from Madurai Kamaraj University in 1989. He received his PhD in history from Jawaharlal Nehru University in 1995. His dissertation was titled "A Social History of Tamil Publishing, (1850–1938)".

== Career ==
Venkatachalapathy worked in the History Department of Manonmaniam Sundaranar University from 1995 to 2000 and that of University of Madras from 2000 to 2001. Since June 2001, he has been a faculty member of the Madras Institute of Development Studies (MIDS). His main areas of research are social and cultural history of colonial Tamil Nadu. He is best known for collecting and publishing the works of Tamil writer Pudhumaipithan in 2000. In 2000, he published his most noted work Andha kaalathil kaapi illai (Kalachuvadu) in Tamil. Later he published an English Version – In Those Days There Was No Coffee, (Yoda Press, 2006). He currently serves in the advisory board of the Tamil iyal virudhu, an annual award given by Tamil Literary Garden, a Canada-based organisation. He is regularly involved in 'The Hindu Literary Festival' (The Hindu Lit for Life) annual events as a speaker, interviewer, resource person etc. He also reviews books in The Hindu. In 2007, he was awarded the V. K. R. V. Rao prize in Social Science Research. He also writes columns for The Hindu, Frontline, Outlook, India Today, Dinamalar and Kalachuvadu magazine.

== Awards and fellowships ==
- Sahitya Akademi Award, 2024
- Visiting Fellow, Maison des Sciences de l'Homme, Paris (1996).
- Visiting Fellow, Indo-French Cultural Exchange Programme, Maison des Sciences de l'Homme, Paris (1997–1998).
- Visiting assistant professor, Department of South Asian Languages and Civilizations, University of Chicago (1999).
- UPE Visiting Fellow, University of Hyderabad (2005).
- Charles Wallace Visiting Fellow, Centre of South Asian Studies, University of Cambridge (2006).
- V. K. R. V. Rao prize in Social Science Research (2007)

== Bibliography ==
=== Books in English ===
- (trans.) Sundara Ramaswamy's J.J : Some Jottings, New Delhi : Katha (2003)
- (ed.) A. K. Chettiar, In the Tracks of the Mahatma: The Making of a Documentary, Hyderabad: Orient Longman (2006)
- In Those Days There Was No Coffee: Writings in Cultural History, New Delhi: Yoda Press (2006)
- (ed.) Chennai, Not Madras: Perspectives on the city, Mumbai: Marg (2006)
- Kalaikkalanjiyam: the making of the Tamil encyclopaedia, 1947–1968, Centre of South Asian Studies, University of Cambridge (2007)
- (ed.) Love Stands Alone: Selections from Tamil Sangam Poetry (translated by M. L. Thangappa), New Delhi: Penguin Books (2010)
- Who Owns That Song: The Battle for Subramania Bharati's Copyright (2018)

=== Books in Tamil ===
- திருநெல்வேலி எழுச்சியும், வ.உ.சி.யும் 1908
- (ed.) Pudumaippithan Kathaigal (first volume of chronological and variorum edition of the complete works of Pudumaippithan), Nagercoil (2000)
- Andha Kalathil Kappi Illai Muthalana Aaivu Katturaigal (collection of research papers on Tamil cultural history), Nagercoil: Kalachuvadu Pathippagam (2000)
- (ed.) Pudumaippithan Katturaigal (second volume of chronological and variorum edition of the complete works of Pudumaippithan), Nagercoil (2002)
- Novelum Vasippum: Oru Varalattru Parvai (Early Novels and Reading Practices: A Historical View), Nagercoil (2002).
- A.K.Chettiar, Annal Adichuvattil (The making of the documentary, Mahatma Gandhi), Nagercoil: Kalachuvadu Pathippagam (2003).
- Mullai: Oar Arimugam, Chennai: Mullai Pathippagam (2004)
- (ed.) Pudumaippithan Mozhipeyarppukal (third volume of the chronological and variorum edition of the complete works of Pudumaippithan), Nagercoil (2006)
- Mucchanthi Ilakkiyam (Popular Literature in Colonial Tamil Nadu), Nagercoil (2004)
- (ed.), Bharatiyin 'Vijaya' Katturaigal, Nagercoil: Kalachuvadu Pathippagam (2004).
- (trans.) Thuyarmiku Varikalai Indriravu Nan Ezhutalam (Tamil Translation of Pablo Neruda), Nagercoil: Kalachuvadu Pathippagam (2005)
- (trans.) Varalaarum Karuthiyalum (Tamil translation of Past and Prejudice by Romila Thapar), Delhi: National Book Trust (2008)
- (trans.) Bharati Karuvoolam: Hindu Nalithalil Bharatiyin Eluthukal, Nagercoil: Kalachuvadu Pathippagam (2008).

== See also ==
- List of Sahitya Akademi Award winners for Tamil
- List of Indian writers
- List of Tamil-language writers
