= A. K. Chettiar =

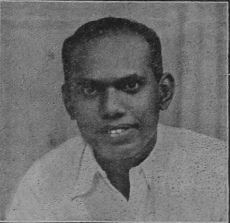
- A. K. Chettiar in 1940s
- Born: A. Karuppan Chettiar; 3 November 1911; Kottaiyur, Madras Presidency, British India
- Died: 10 September 1983 (aged 71)
- Occupation: Journalist

A. K. Chettiar (3 November 1911 – 10 September 1983) was a travelogue writer, journalist and documentary film maker from Tamil Nadu, India. He is most notable for pioneering travelogue writing in Tamil and for his documentary on Mahatma Gandhi.

== Biography ==
=== Early years ===
Born in Nattukottai Nagarathar Family in Kottaiyur in Madras Presidency, A. Karuppan Chettiar finished his schooling in Tiruvannamalai. He was interested in travelling and started on a world tour in the 1930s. In 1935, he went to Japan to learn photography at the Imperial College of Technology, Tokyo and studied there for a year. In 1937, he joined the New York Institute of Photography and completed a one-year diploma course in photography.

=== Film ===
In 1937, he started work on the documentary Mahatma Gandhi: Twentieth Century Prophet. He set up a company named "Documentary Films Limited" and started collecting archival footage of Gandhi. He visited many places in India, London, and South Africa and acquired large amounts of archival footage. In addition he himself shot many contemporary scenes of Gandhi. After three years, he accumulated about 50,000 feet (15,000 m) of film footage. Editing of the footage began in January 1940 and eventually 12,000 feet (3,700 m) in documentary film was released on 23 August 1940. It received widespread coverage from the Indian press and a few international newspapers like The New York Times. The documentary originally had voice-overs in Tamil and was later dubbed into Telugu. After the initial screening, it was withdrawn from cinemas due to government censorship. Chettiar recorded some of his experiences in making the documentary in a series of articles in the magazine Kumari Malar (published by him) in 1943. These articles where eventually published in book form with the title Annal Adichuvattil (In the footsteps of the Mahatma).

After Indian independence in 1947, the documentary was dubbed into Hindi and re-released. For a long time, it was believed to be lost. In 2006, an abridged version made in 1998 and dubbed in English was discovered at the San Francisco State University due to historian A. R. Venkatachalapathy's efforts. Later another copy was found in the University of Pennsylvania. However the original documentary and other language versions have not been found so far.

=== Writing ===
Chettiar is considered as "one of the foremost writers of modern travelogues in Tamil". He collected more than 140 travel essays in Tamil belonging to the 1825–1940 period, edited and published them as a book in 1940. His own travel essays were published first in 1940 as Ulagam surrum Tamilan (The Globe Trotting Tamil). He has written a total of seventeen travel books.

Chettiar first published a Tamil magazine called Dhanavanigan in Burma when he was twenty years old. In 1930, he helped to set up the magazine Ananda Vikatan. From 1943 till his death in 1983, he edited and published Kumari Malar from Chennai.
