= Hari Sevugan =

Personal details
- Born: December 30, 1974 (age 51) DevakottaiTamil Nadu, India
- Party: Democratic
- Education: University of Illinois, Urbana- Champaign; Northwestern University

Hari Sevugan (born 1974) is the former national press secretary for the Democratic National Committee. He served as the senior spokesman for the Barack Obama presidential campaign. According to one report "Sevugan's sound bytes were often pithy, biting and memorable." Another report is more direct, noting during the 2008 campaign Sevugan always gave out "the press office's harshest lines." He is currently one of the Principals at Chicago-based advocacy firm 270 Strategies.

In June, 2011, Sevugan left his position with the DNC to become the Vice President of Communications for StudentsFirst, an education reform organization founded by Michelle A. Rhee, former chancellor of the Washington, D.C. public schools. He resigned his position in 2012 amidst reports of political differences.

Sevugan grew up in the suburbs of Chicago after moving to the United States with his family from India in 1977. He majored in political science at University of Illinois at Urbana–Champaign, and received a JD from Northwestern Universityin 2001. In 2003, he left his legal practice at Neal, Gerber and Eisenberg. He then joined the John Edwards campaign for president. Later he served in the political campaign for Dan Hynes against Barack Obama in the Democratic primary for an open Senate seat from Illinois.

Prior to his career in politics, Sevugan was a middle school teacher at I.S. 143 in the Washington Heights neighborhood of New York City, where he once dyed his hair blond in front of the entire school after losing a bet with his students.

In August 2019, Sevugan joined the campaign of presidential candidate Pete Buttigieg as deputy campaign manager for brand and media.
