= Kandangi =

Type of cotton sari from Tamil Nadu, India

Kandangi Saree
- Geographical indication
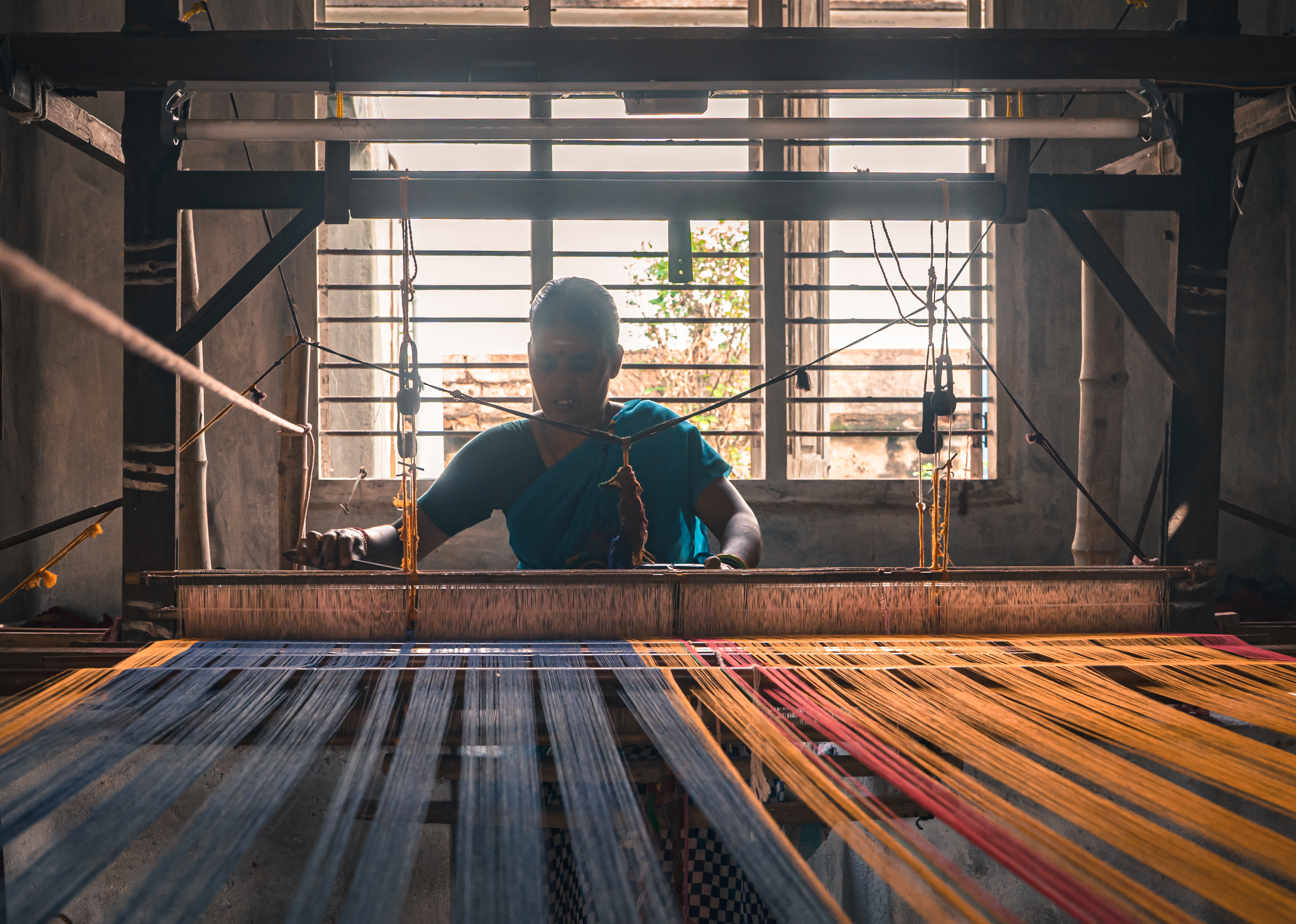
- Description: Cotton saris from Chettinad region
- Type: Handicraft
- Area: Chettinad, Tamil Nadu
- Country: India
- Registered: 2019–20
- Material: cotton, vegetable dyes

Kandangi is a type of cotton saree from the Chettinad region of the Indian state of Tamil Nadu. It was declared as a Geographical indication in 2019–20.

== Description ==
The Chettinadu Kandangi saree is native to the Chettinad region and has been in existence for over 150 years. Kandangi saris were traditionally made of silk. Later, cotton was used for convenience. The saris are known for its checkered pattern using multiple colors with thick contrasting borders. Earthen colors and hues are used, mostly obtained from vegetable dyes. The sari is coarse and made with a 40 thread count typically, to ensure longetivity.

== Process ==
The cotton yarn is dyed to different colors as per requirement. After drying, the yarn is spun and collected in spools. The spools are warped, where the threads are separated and wound into warps. Cotton yarn is also hand spun to be used for wefting. The warps and wefts are loaded into a handloom, where the cloth is weaved.
