= Reshma Valliappan =

Indian artist and activist

- Born: Reshma V. Valliappan; 19 May 1980 (age 46)
- Education: Sekolah Menengah Convent Klang Church of Our Lady of Lourdes Klang, Hutchings High School, Fergusson College, SNDT, University of Pune, Jnana-Deepa Vidyapeeth
- Occupations: Self-advocacy, artist, activist, writer
- Website: www.valresh.com

Reshma Valliappan, also known as Val Resh (born 1980), is an artist-activist for a number of issues related to mental health, disability, sexuality and human rights. Being compared to John Forbes Nash Jr. as A beautiful mind, yet again she is an artist with a beat of her own. She is a face that is difficult to ignore, with numerous piercings, tattoos and her distinct personality she was spotted as one of the faces for a feminist human rights organization CREA's photo book publication by artist and photographer Rebecca Swan.

== Media and culture ==
A Drop of Sunshine became an award-winning documentary. It won the Rajat Kamal (Silver Lotus Award) as the Best Motivational/ Inspirational/ Instructional Film for the 59th National Film Awards, the oldest and most prestigious Awards for films in India.

It won the highest number of awards at the annual Indian Documentary Producers' Association IDPA 2011. The documentary received The Gold Award for Best Film (Theme), Gold Award for Best Film (TV Non-Fiction), Gold Awards for Best Sound Design (Non-Fiction), Certificate of Merit for Cinematography by Yasir Abbasi, and Certificate of Merit for Non-Fiction Film above 30 minutes.

Reshma has also been featured on CNN IBN Living It Up on her reasons for not taking the conventional approach and creating platforms of help through her work The Red Door.

== Recognition and career ==
=== Activism ===
Reshma is the co-founder of Mind Arcs and runs a creative initiative called The Red Door which uses social media (blogs, Facebook and Twitter) to address the issues of mental health and mentally ill . Her work requires her online presence as she often plays the role of a peer support to many others who find comfort in anonymity which is available online. Peter C. Goldmark, Jr. referred to her in his weekly column for Newsday as the 'Unlikely warrior against mental illness'.

She helped lead a campaign in 2012 during her fellowship given to her by Bhargavi Davar of The Bapu Trust to free a woman who had been found to be "of unsound mind" and imprisoned against her will in a state mental hospital. Through determined advocacy and with guidance and help from other activist, they managed to get the woman released in two weeks, the second case of such in two hundred years of the psychiatry in India.

She was elected Ashoka fellow in 2014 and Ink Fellow 2014.

Valliappan works towards raising issues of sexuality and mental illness and how both are viewed under the lens of pathology especially if the person has a mental illness. Having been trained under NCPEDP as a shadow report writer for the UNCRPD (Convention on the Rights of Persons with Disabilities) she uses the term four wall problem synonymous to the Revolving door.

=== Writing and Advocacy ===
Reshma Valliappan was recognized with other journalist at the SCARF-PII Award 2014 for her piece in The Hindu titled 'On Being Normal' though having no clue about what journalism is and writes because it's a form of catharsis. Valliappan gave a sterling speech at the end of the presentation about the rights and discrimination faced by people with mental illness:

"I have never raped, tortured, or abused anyone, and yet because I am a 'survivor of psychiatry', neither the government nor society gives me the rights I deserve. Indian law states that people with mental illness cannot travel in an aeroplane unless they are sedated...They can’t vote, have no say in their treatment and don’t have the same right to education as others. Many of these rules are unconstitutional, but nobody is willing to change these archaic rules".

The award was presented to her by Rajiv Menon who said it was time a more realistic view of mental health was depicted in cinema industry instead of the hackneyed style. Director of Scarf, Thara Srinivasan said Valliappan should set an example for others as it is important to recognize well researched stories on mental health.

Valliappan's first and last name have often been mis-spelt making it difficult to verify many of her work. Her first name 'Reshma' has been spelt as 'Rashmi' or even as 'Reshmi'.

== Awards and nominations ==
WIN PUNE Woman of the Year

- 2012–2013

SCARF and Press Institute of India Media for Mental Health

- 2013–2014: 'Survivor of Psychiatry' Bags Media for Mental Health Award

== Sources ==
- Savage, Lorraine. (2009). Mental Illness. Gale Group. ISBN 9780737743487.
