= Chettinad mansions =

Buildings in Tamil Nadu, India

The Chettinad mansions are a collection of over 10,000 lavish homes of the Nattukottai Chettiar and Vallam Velallar community in the region of Chettinad in South India. These mansions were built with materials from all across the globe to signify the community's wealth as merchants in the late 19th and early 20th centuries. The mansions blended global features with traditional Tamil architecture to form homes for large joint families. Since World War II, conservation efforts have been ongoing to maintain these homes and draw in tourists from across the globe. However, preserving the mansions has been difficult due to legal challenges and cost barriers. The Chettiar community has looked to upkeep their built heritage by leasing the houses to Indian hotel chains and exploring other solutions.

== History of creation ==
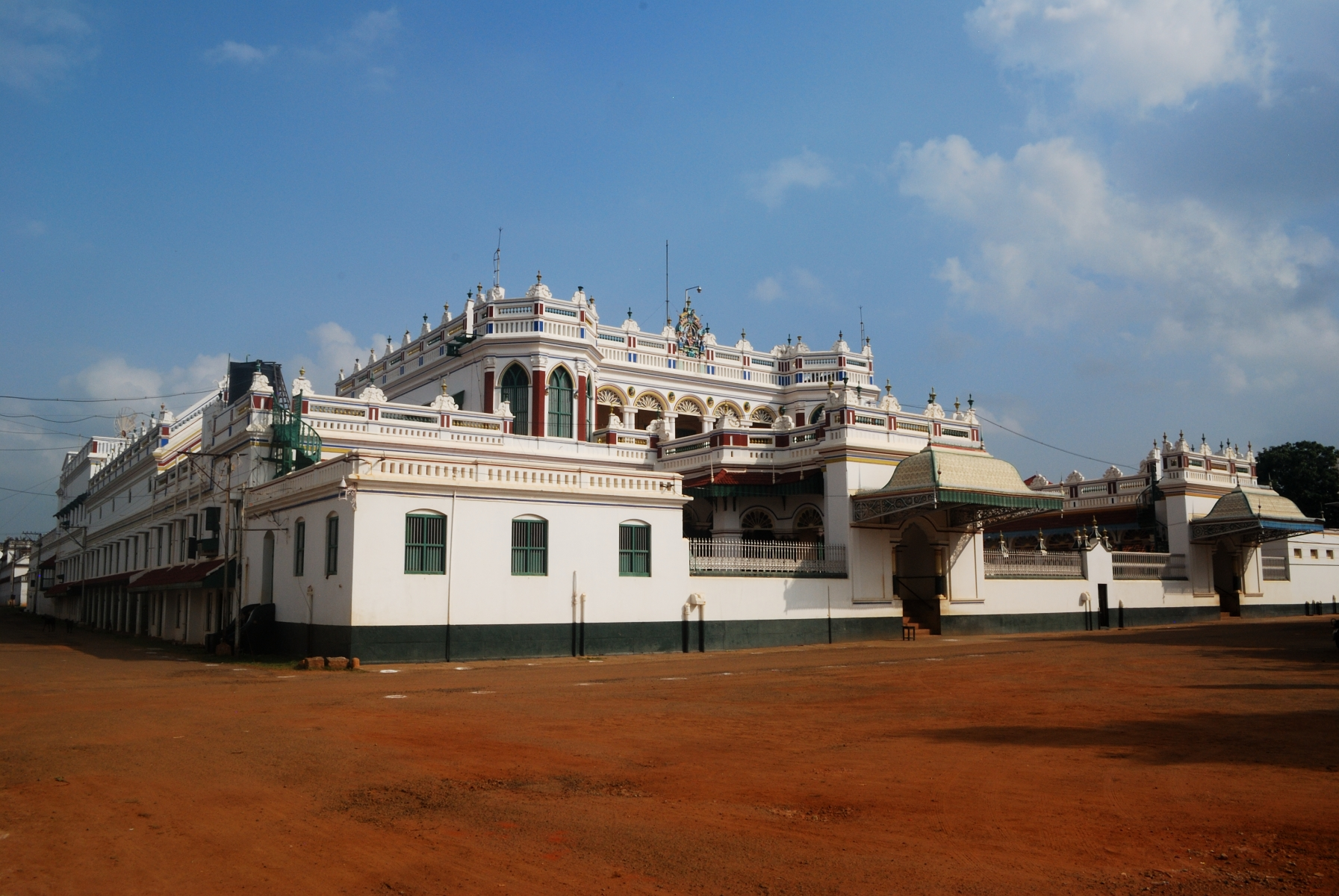
A well-known Chettinad mansion - the Kanadukathan Raja Palace

The region of Chettinad in the south Indian state of Tamil Nadu is the home of the Nattukottai Chettiar community, a prosperous merchant community known for trading precious stones in Southeast Asia. As traders, Chettiars shipped spices, rice, and gems to countries like Malaysia, Burma, and Vietnam and also served as bankers to kings and the British Raj for centuries. They rose to the peak of their power in the late 19th and early 20th centuries. As a major Hindu banking community in South India, the Chettiar community gained a vast influence and richness that allowed them to build a dense network of 96 villages within the region; however, only 73 villages remain today.

Between 1850 and the end of World War II, the Nattukottai Chettiar community built over 10,000 lavish mansions in the region with many spanning tens of thousands of square feet. The houses were built for joint families to live together as many houses had 70-80 residents at one time. On average, every mansion has more than 50 rooms and three to four courtyards. Most span more than one acre, often covering an entire street. Given the scale, many locals refer to the houses as periya veedus or “big houses''. The mansions were conceived to perform the different rituals and celebrations that occur during the course of life from birth to death such as marriage and birthday events.

== Architecture and materials ==
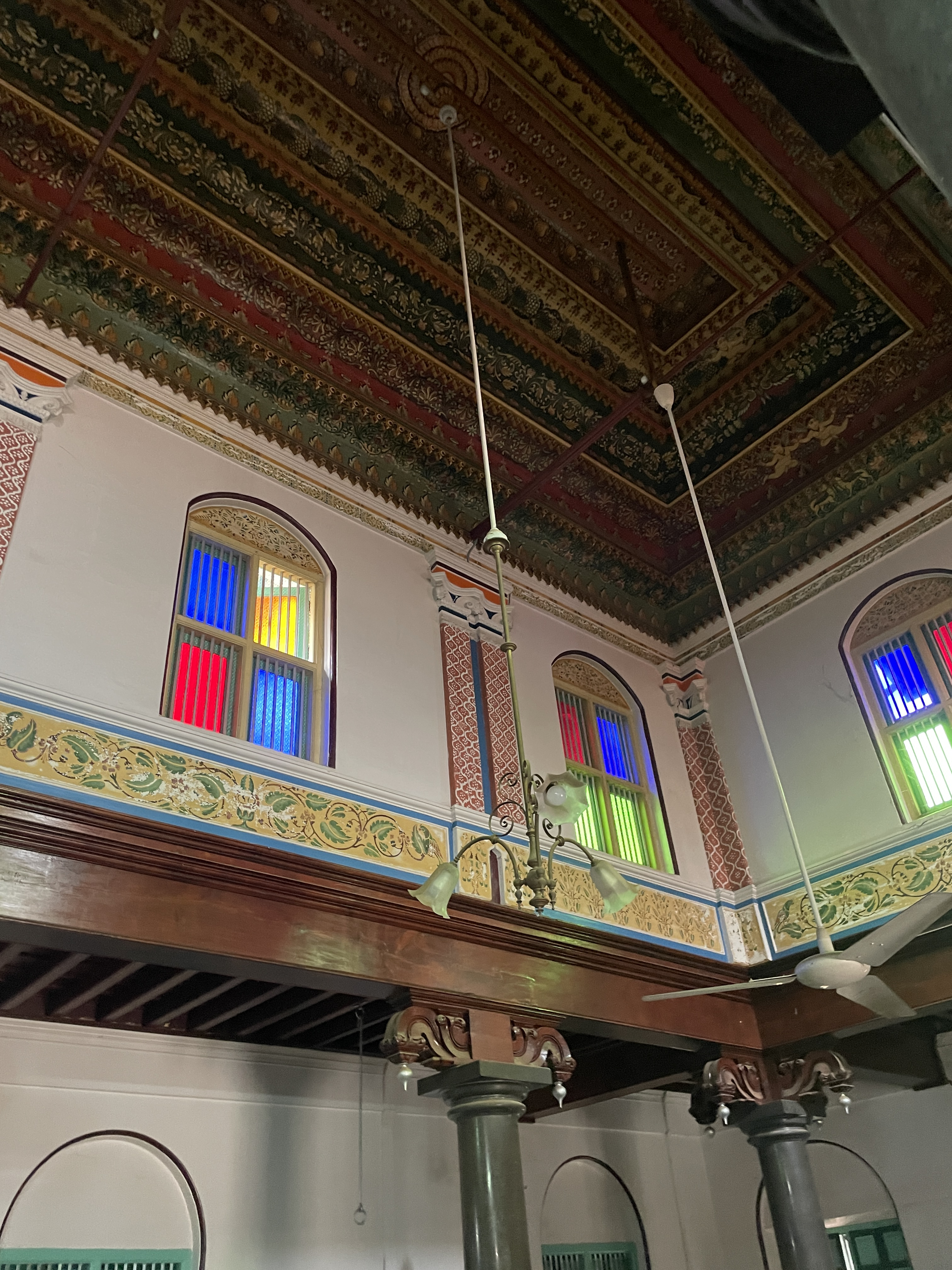
Example of stained glass windows and interior design of mansions

When building these mansions, Chettiars were inspired by European architecture and commissioned local architects to work with raw materials from all over the world. Consequently, aspects like marble floors, stained glass windows, and gothic facades became a common feature in every house. These elements were blended with components of vernacular Tamil architecture as well. Examples of this traditional design can be seen in the open courtyards, raised verandas, carved wooden frames, and stucco depictions of Hindu deities.

The Chettiar community also had a strong vision of land-use planning which connected the different urban to landscape elements, particularly for rainwater harvesting and storage systems. The slopes of the roofs allowed rainwater to be collected during monsoon season to fill up a village’s wells and common ponds. Courtyards were built on a longitudinal axis and were made of thick walls of brick, lime plasters, terracotta roofing, and marble floors to limit the effects of the semi-arid, hot climate.

There are countless examples of the materials that Chettiars sourced from all over the world. Materials included: teak wood from Burma, satinwood from Ceylon, marble from Italy and Belgium, tiles from Bombay, Japan, Germany, France, and England, and chandeliers from Belgium, France, and Italy. Given the quality of these items, Chettiars brought in craftsmen from all over India to help with woodcarving, frescoes, egg-plastering, and other complex projects.

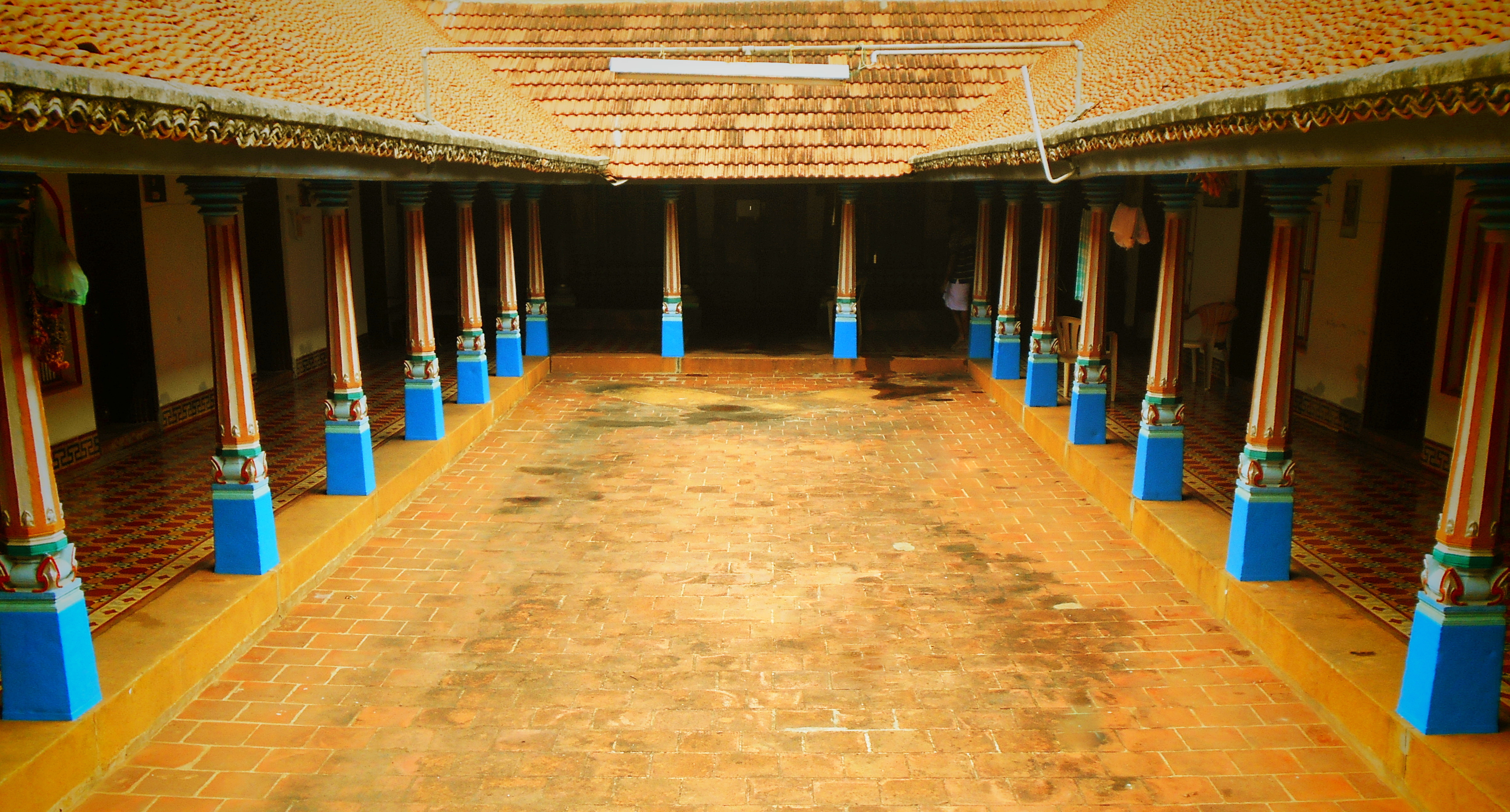
A traditional center courtyard

The main courtyard of any of the mansions is considered the center part of the house where the rituals take place. It operates as a temple sanctuary where priests from Chettiar temples celebrate important events. The interior of the mansions conform strictly to a layout that reflects the culture’s class and gender differences. For example, it is common to find a covered area where men used to conduct business with tradesmen on two raised platforms called Thinnais that flank the front door of any house.

== Preservation over time ==
When World War II began in 1939, overseas trading took a hit that led to a decline in wealth for many Chettiars. The community faced financial pressures from the British, Japanese, and other countries in key trading zones like Burma. With their economic system in shards, most Chettiars left their villages to seek employment outside of Chettinad in Chennai, Mumbai, Singapore, and other places across the globe. This left many of their mansions abandoned.

Conservation efforts since the end of World War II have been incredibly difficult due to legal battles and cost barriers. Renovation expenses of Chettinad homes can run into the thousands and are often recurring costs to maintain the properties. Numerous mansions have remained abandoned because of ongoing legal battles over ownership; this is because houses have numerous owners that are the male descendants of the original residents.

Research shows that owners are enthusiastic about architectural preservation and are exploring different ways to sustain the houses. One method has been to lease the homes to Indian hotel chains to generate tourist income and spread the Chettiar heritage with people from across the world. One example is Chidambara Vilas, a 25 bedroom luxury hotel retrofitted from a traditional Chettinad mansion. The hotel group conducted a 3-year restoration to transform the 118-year-old mansion into a tourist destination in the village of Kadiapatti. Overall, 10% of Chettinad mansions have received tourist makeovers, whereas 30% have been completely destroyed. It will likely require the whole Chettiar community to come together to preserve these important examples of built heritage going forward.
