= Soma Valliappan =

Indian writer

Soma Valliappan

Soma Valliappan is an Indian writer, speaker, trainer, and an expert in the areas of Human Resource Management, Personality development, and Financial Investments. He is the author of over 60 books in Tamil and English on various subjects including self-development, the stock market, emotional intelligence, time management, sales, leadership, and personality development.

== Career ==
His book "Alla Alla Panam," released in 2004 by Kizhakku Publishers (New Horizon Media), has sold over 100,000 copies in approximately 5 years. It serves as an introduction to the basics of stock market and investment techniques for readers.

Valliyappan is often invited by multiple Tamil television channels to provide his insights on stock markets and economic events. He has made appearances on various TV programs, including Star Vijay, DD Podhigai, Makkal TV, Kalaignar Seithigal & Puthia Thalaimurai TV among others.

On March 22, 2019, Valliyappan visited Erode Sengunthar Engineering College in Perundurai, Erode, where he delivered a speech addressing current issues relevant to engineering students and encouraged them to strive for excellence in their field.

== Birth and Education ==
Dr. Soma Valliappan, born on September 18, 1957, in Cuddalore, TN, hails from Devakottai. He holds a Bachelor's degree in Economics from Madras University and a Master's degree in Business Administration with specializations in Human Resources and Marketing. Additionally, he obtained a Post Graduate Diploma in Personnel Management with a focus on Personnel Management & Industrial Relations from the National Institute of Personnel Management in Kolkata.

Before his graduation, he completed a Diploma in Hotel Management & Catering Technology at the Institute of Hotel Management & Catering Technology in Chennai. Dr. Valliappan was awarded a Ph.D. by Madras University for his research on Emotional Intelligence and is also a certified Master Practitioner in NLP.

== Professional Experience ==
Valliyappan has held numerous senior and executive positions in Human Resource Management across various sectors, His professional experience spans roles at esteemed organizations such as BHEL, Whirlpool, PepsiCo India Holdings, Indian Hotels Co Ltd, Hindustan Motors Ltd, Cameo, and Navia Markets Ltd. Presently, Valliyappan is involved in operating a management consulting services company, Menmai Management Consultancy Services.

== Human Resource Development ==
Valliyappan is a Life Member of the National HR Development Network (NHRD), an association committed to promoting the HR movement in India.

His areas of interest in HR include Strategic HR, Performance measurement and management, Reward and compensation, 360-degree feedback, Emotional intelligence, Balanced Scorecard, and Personal effectiveness, among others.

== Teaching and Training ==
Valliyappan has a strong affiliation with academia, having engaged in teaching and training since 1990. He currently holds a position as a member of the Board of Studies at Alagappa Institute of Management in Karaikudi. Additionally, he has previously served as a member of the Board of Studies at St. Joseph's College and Bishop Heber College in Trichy, and has contributed to the Selection Committee of Bharathidhasan Institute of Management in Trichy and IIM Ranchi. Moreover, Valliyappan has shared his expertise as a visiting faculty member at Bharathidasan University in Tiruchirappalli and the Institute for Financial Management and Research (IFMR) in Chennai.

On behalf of National Stock Exchange, Madras Stock Exchange, Securities Exchange Board of India, and South Indian Chamber of Commerce & Industry, he has spoken at a number of seminars for the public, as well as investors and management students, mainly on stock markets.

== Writing ==
=== Books ===
==== HR, Investment and Management ====
Valliyappan's first book, Thittamiduvom Vetriperuvom, which dealt with Self-development, was published in the year 2002. His first book did well in the market and he continued authoring books such as Thottathellam Ponnaagum, Kaalam Ungal Kaladiyil etc. which introduced many specialized subjects in management for Tamil readers.

Valliyappan's Alla Alla Panam, published in August 2004 by Kizhakku Publishers (New Horizon Media), sold ten thousand copies in the first few months of its launch. In 2010, the book's sale crossed the one lakh copies sold mark.

Following the success of Alla Alla Panam, (AAP) which introduced the basics of stock markets, he wrote four more books on different aspects of the stock market and investment such as Technical & Fundamental analysis (AAP-2), Futures and Options( AAP-3), Portfolio Management (AAP-4) and Trading (AAP-5). Mutual Funds (AAP -6), Gold, silver & crypto (AAP-7) Insurance (AAP-8).

Soon, Valliyappan became known in the Tamil publishing world. He gained the reputation of being one of the very few Tamil authors who can competently present successful management subjects to the common man. Valliyappan can be credited with introducing many management concepts for the first time in Tamil. For instance, his book, Idliyaaga Irungal, is the first in Tamil on the subject of Emotional intelligence. His recent book, Thallu, is on motivational techniques followed in the corporate world.

His writings were published by Anna University under the title Nirvaagaththiran Membaadugal as part of its initiative to promote women empowerment. His book on mental health, Mana Azhuththam Virattalaama was published by Kizhakku Publisher's Prodigy imprint, for the benefit of students.

Dr Soma Valliappan has given out many motivational books for the benefit of students and young managers. Some of his popular titles are: Ushaar Ulle Paar, which deals with the Power of Mind; Aaalappirandhavargal Neengal, on leadership qualities; Ulagam Un vasam, on communication skills, Nee Asatharanamanavan, Ellorum Vallaree. His two books, Idliyaaga Irungal and Alla Alla Panam are in the list of recommended readings for students of a college in Madurai, and Bharathiar University, Coimbatore, respectively.

He has written about Economics in Tamil (Nattu kannaku 1 and Nattu Kannaku 2) and also about Demonetization (Athirntha India).

Dr Soma Valliappan researched about Management thoughts in Kambaramayanam and has written a book- Management Guru Kamban Soma Valliappan' first book in English, You vs You - Everything about Emotional Intelligence published in 2013 won a prize from ISTD. His second English book, Bulls and Bears - All about Shares was published in 2015. Third one i You are extraordinary- for School students.

==== Columns ====
In the late 1990s, Valliyappan wrote several self-development articles for magazines including Mangaiyar Malar under the pen name, SMV. He had written over 40 articles – including center-page articles, about human resource and self-development in Dinamani newspaper.

Valliyappan writes columns on business and investment in leading Tamil periodicals including Ananda Vikatan, Kumudam, kumudham Snekithi, Naanayam Vikadan. He writes in general interest magazines like Amuda Surabi, Puthiya thalaimurai, Pavayar malar, Namadhu Nambikkai, and Grassroot, on personality development.

Valliyappan writes 4th page articles in leading Tamil daily, Thinathanthi

==== Creative Writing ====
Valliappan has written several short stories in the 1990s that were published in leading Tamil magazines including Kalki, Ananda Vikatan, Mangaiyar Malar, Tamilarasi, and Dinamalar Varamalar. His short story titled Paathippugal, published in 1993, was adjudged as the best short story of the month by Ilakkiya Sinthanaigal, a Tamil literary association.

His published works in creative writing also include a short story collection (reprint title: Nejam Ellam Nee by Apple Publications, Gemini Circle (Kizaku pathpakam) and a novel, Pattampoochigalin Kannammoochi Kaalam (Manivasakar).

=== Interviews ===
He appears on popular Tamil TV channels including: Star Vijay, Kalaignar Seithigal, Jaya, Jaya Plus, and Makkal TV. His talks and Interviews are aired by All India Radio Channel 2, Radio Mirchi, Aha FM, Radio City, Radio 1 and Singapore Oli. Kumudam.com publishes Valliyappan's interviews in multiple media formats including video in their Web TV. He has written Panam pannalaam Panam, Panam for 24 weeks in popular Tamil weekly Ananda Vikatan and Panam Panna Neenga Readya, a 19-week series, Panam sila sandhegangal, a 20-week series, and Paname Oodivaa, a 29-week series for Popular Kumudam, Tamil weekly magazine, all on financial Management.

He had published audio books too.

=== Books List ===
Soma Valliappan has authored about 70 books in various topics

==== Self Development ====
1. Idliyaaga Irungal (Emotional Intelligence ) New Horizon Media, Chennai
2. Emotional Intelligence 2.0 -New Horizon Media, Chennai
3. Teen tharigada ( For Tenn Agers) New Horizon Media, Chennai
4. Thadaiyedhumillai ( Self Development- Collection of Articles written in Dinamani)- Vijaya pathippagam, Coimbatore
5. Adhigaaram Alla, Anbu- ( Self Development- Collection of Articles written in Dinamani)- Vijaya pathippagam, Coimbatore
6. Appa Magan (Father-son relationship) -Vijaya pathippagam, Coimbatore
7. Mana Azhuththam Virattalaama (For School Students on Stress Management- for UNESCO) Prodigey-NHM
8. kathal Mudal thiruman varai (About Marriage & Husband and Wife relationship), NHM
9. Nallathaka Nallu Varthai (Self Development- Collection of Articles written in Dinamani)- Manivasakar Chennai 101
10. Ushaar Ulle Paar (About the power of the mind) NHM
11. Indhamurai Neethaan (for School final students- motivation) Vijaya Pathippagam, Coimbatore
12. Neengal Virumbum Vellaiyai Vendruedupathu Epadi (Full details about employment interviews and Group Discusions) NHM
13. Thallu (On Motivation & Performance Management) NHM
14. Munnetram Indha Pakkam (Complete road map for developing & achieving the objectives) Vijaya pathippagam, Coimbatore
15. Chinna thuuNdil periya meen - Apple Patipagam
16. Sollathathaiyum Sey - Sixth Sense
17. IvvaLavuthaana nee - Sixth Sense
18. Neengal Asatharanamanavar - NHM Publications
19. Ellorum Vallavaree -NHM
20. Rasavatham- Ethilum peru veRRi pera - about NLP
21. Nerathai uramaakku - Time Management - New Horizon Media, Chennai
22. Rasavatham -Ethilum peru vetri (about NLP) NHM Chennai
23. Avasaram - udanadiyaka syy veeNdiya smuka porulathaara maaRRangkaL(NHM)
  1. Nallathaka naalu varthai
24. Nalla manam vazka
25. Makizsiyaka valungal

==== Management ====
1. Aaallappirandhavar Neengal (On Leadership) Revised and expanded Sixth sense publications Chennai 17
2. Thittamiduvom Vetriperuvom (Motivation & Planning) Apple publications
3. Kaalam Ungal Kaladiyil (On Time Management) NHM, Chennai
4. Yaar Nee? (Knowing ones personality and its Characters) NHM
5. Ulagam Un Vasam (On Communication ) NHM
6. Urudhimattume Vendum (On the importance of the Commitment- Motivation) NHM, Chennai
7. Uravugal Menpada (On Interpersonal Relationship) NHM, Chennai
8. Sirandha Nirvaagi Yeppadi? (On how to grow in an Organisation- Motivation & Techniques) NHM, Chennai
9. Nattu Kannaku (Economics), Sixth Sense publications
10. Nattu Kanaku -2 ( Economics) Sixth Sense publications
11. Thotathellam Ponagum, Sixth Sense publications
12. Manathodu oru sitting ( about Mind) - NHM publications
13. Siru thuli perumpaNam - Sixth Sense publications
14. Management Guru Kamban - NHM publications
15. You vs. You (Emotional Intelligence) Productivity and Quality publishers

==== Stock Market ====
1. Alla Alla Panam – 1 Revised 2012 (Basics of Stock Market- Complete details- 225 pages) NHM, Chennai
2. Alla Alla Panam – 2 Revised 2012 (On Stock Market Fundamental & Technical Analysis- in some detail) NHM
3. Alla Alla Panam – 3 (On Stock Markets- Futurs & Options) NHM, Chennai
4. Alla Alla Panam – 4 (On Portfolio management- Stocks) NHM, Chennai
5. Alla Alla Panam – 5 (Trading in Stock markets- Candles) NHM, Chennai
6. Alla Alla Panam – 6 (Mutual Funds) NHM, Chennai
7. Alla Alla Panam – 7 (Gold,Silver & Cryptocurrency)NHM, Chennai
8. Alla Alla Panam – 8 (Insurance) NHM, Chennai
9. Panguchanthai Oru Arimugam ( Brief Introduction to Stock Markets) Prodigy, NHM, Chennai
10. Paname Oodivaa (On various Investment opportunities including FDs, ELSS, PF, ULIPS, GOLD, Stocks etc.) New Horizon Media, Chennai
11. Share Market Secrets - Sixth Sense publications
12. Sikkanam Semipu Muthaleedu -New Horizon Media, Chennai

Books in Other Languages

1. Bulls & Bears - All about Shares - English - Productivity & Quality Publishing
2. Share Bazzar Secrets - Hindi

==== Knowledge sharing ====
Sorgaththin Sonthakaarar (On buying a Flat or House) NHM, Chennai. K Balachander- Velai Drama Cinema- Sixth Sense

==== Business ====
1. Thottathellam Ponnaagum (Motivation and details of starting a Business) NHM, Chennai
2. Nermaiyaka sampathikka ivvalavu vazikaLaa (Serial that was published in Anada Vikadan- different opportunities to start small businesses) NHM, Chennai
3. Number 1 Salesman (Details of Sales- Prospecting to closing the Sale) NHM, Chennai
4. Chinna Thoondil Periya Meen (Methods for High Productivity in Personal life) Alagappar Pathippagam, Karaikudi
5. siRuthuLi perum paNam - Alagappar Pathippagam Karaikudi

== Notes ==
- https://www.youtube.com/watch?v=F8QGafpOwHQ&t=45s
- https://www.youtube.com/watch?v=6hgfHNTOncQ
- https://www.youtube.com/watch?v=xc_rd-VUoSA&feature=youtube
- https://www.youtube.com/watch?v=8ekMwsCSK8A
- https://www.youtube.com/watch?v=t1lXjWqCk98
- https://www.youtube.com/watch?v=5dQ7TBPIYUc
- https://www.youtube.com/watch?v=Qzi5XZSq7tE
- https://www.youtube.com/watch?v=igkjFavIHo4
- https://www.youtube.com/watch?v=dVJ95pXYXEw
- https://www.youtube.com/watch?v=nnuDFGlNT5U&t=121s
- https://www.youtube.com/watch?v=jxDjUIXS5dI
- https://www.youtube.com/watch?v=HBdZx82tCv8
- https://www.youtube.com/watch?v=8YHQNDeu9vM
- https://www.youtube.com/watch?v=5f9KQodJQr8
- https://www.youtube.com/watch?v=JIcMpwP3K-Y
- https://www.youtube.com/watch?v=zPJ91xHKg5I
- https://www.youtube.com/watch?v=ZZ9kKRWl07s
- https://www.youtube.com/watch?v=hI1HPCICpLw&t=4s
- https://www.youtube.com/watch?v=2MUWXJ_KG2s
- https://www.youtube.com/watch?v=AG400e3zXXg
- https://www.youtube.com/watch?v=AsglWAjGcK8
- https://www.youtube.com/watch?v=Sb85nytJ84c
- https://www.youtube.com/watch?v=zSE5yNgExP8
- https://www.youtube.com/watch?v=tg0QUKFUg_E
- https://www.youtube.com/watch?v=7hnY7FL3Oh0
- https://www.youtube.com/watch?v=z7MV8BuTNT4
- https://www.youtube.com/watch?v=bBNU2hYmB7U
- https://www.youtube.com/watch?v=x1INcGDFKMk
- http://www.dinakaran.com/Ladies_Detail.asp?Nid=1236&cat=501
- https://www.adrasaka.com/2013/01/blog-post_3241.html
- http://ns7.tv/ta/positive-and-negative-demonetisation.html
- http://www.dinamani.com/junction/ellorum-vallavarey/
- https://www.youtube.com/watch?v=4SRaGVZypSY
- https://www.youtube.com/watch?v=cpmHgbn_dH4&t=5s
- https://www.youtube.com/watch?v=swZ152uHCr0
- https://www.youtube.com/watch?v=IcNkOe0VSc8
- https://www.youtube.com/watch?v=Ycyh_wouUWg&t=1094s
- https://www.vikatan.com/news/coverstory/33548.html#vuukle_div
- https://www.youtube.com/watch?v=EP9o5C1iXSU
- https://www.youtube.com/watch?v=YIuN9CBooS4
- https://www.youtube.com/watch?v=d6JwbXwpcEABudget 2017 feb 2017-18
- https://www.youtube.com/watch?v=of_fAewqJNA&t=8s
- https://www.youtube.com/watch?v=4uv-lXiuP_o
- https://www.youtube.com/watch?v=VJXwf302P6o&index=1&list=PL-RDFpvLYFEWCShKiMrhdEw7wL434UOjl
- https://www.youtube.com/watch?v=o9XuP7H7LcE
- https://www.youtube.com/watch?v=dWuoGC3r7ls
- https://www.youtube.com/watch?v=Ycyh_wouUWg&index=2&list=PL1SgYOQ8uzMTDGjxH99rA-6sHzYhcTPn3
- http://newstodaynet.com/chennai/spb-releases-book-director-k-balachander
- https://www.youtube.com/watch?v=ju0RzHM4HwQ
- https://www.youtube.com/watch?v=e2LEa1e3C50* http://newstodaynet.com/chennai/spb-releases-book-director-k-balachander
- https://www.google.co.in/webhp?tab=mw&authuser=2&ei=z7dYWPzoJsWRmQHiobyYBA&ved=0EKkuCAgoAQ#authuser=2&tbm=nws&q=soma+valliappan+
- https://www.youtube.com/watch?v=GVftMi9QPSA
- https://www.youtube.com/watch?v=zrPIh5guKSo
- https://www.youtube.com/watch?v=VAN80OG2plg
- https://www.youtube.com/watch?v=swZ152uHCr0
- https://www.youtube.com/watch?v=IcNkOe0VSc8
- https://www.youtube.com/watch?v=VAN80OG2plg
- https://www.youtube.com/watch?v=u0wC3ZS7_jo
- https://www.youtube.com/watch?v=ju0RzHM4HwQ
- https://www.youtube.com/watch?v=hVE92OiyCVk
- https://hrconclave.iimtrichy.ac.in/
- http://sptc.org.in/motivation-guidance-programme/
- http://www.ppg.edu.in/engg/events.php?page=3
- https://www.mylaporetimes.com/2012/09/international-conference-held-at-vivekanada-college/
- http://vsbcetc.com/photo_gallery/freshers-day-2013/
- http://www.frequency.com/video/neeya-naana-122312/71017073/-/5-11889688
- http://youtube/_JorZzy4Vl4
- http://youtube/ptTrJsyzvAs
