= Tangaliya Shawl =

Shawl and textile made in Gujarat, India

A Tangaliya Shawl is a handwoven, GI protected shawl and textile made by the Dangasia community in Gujarat, India.

The 700-year-old indigenous craft is native to the Surendranagar district, of Saurashtra-region of the state. Traditional variations like Ramraj, Charmalia, Dhunslu, and Lobdi are woven in village clusters of Dedara, Vastadi, Godavari and Vadla in the district.

The textile is usually used as shawl and wraparound skirt by women of the Bharwad Gopalak community of the Wankaner, Amreli, Dehgam, Surendranagar, Joravarnagar, Botad, Bhavnagar and Kutch areas.

== Technique ==
The shawls are woven in pit looms at homes and knot a contrast color thread with the warp, which are woven into the textile to create the effect of raised dots, which have become the signature style of the textile. Besides dots, several, geometric patterns like circles, straight lines, hyperbolic or parabolic designs etc.are also created.

== Revival ==
In 2007, with the help of National Institute of Fashion Technology (NIFT), in Gandhinagar, the Tangaliya Hastkala Association (Tangaliya Handicraft Association) was formed, which included 226 Tangaliya weavers from five villages as members. Over the subsequent years, NIFT conducted workshops for skill building, quality control and design development. Eventually, the Tangaliya Hastkala Association (THA) received GI registration status.

These days, the textile is used for dupatta, dress material and home furnishing products like bedsheets and pillow covers. Instead of traditional cotton or sheep wool yarn, merino wool and eri silk are used.
