= Vairavanpatti =

- Village
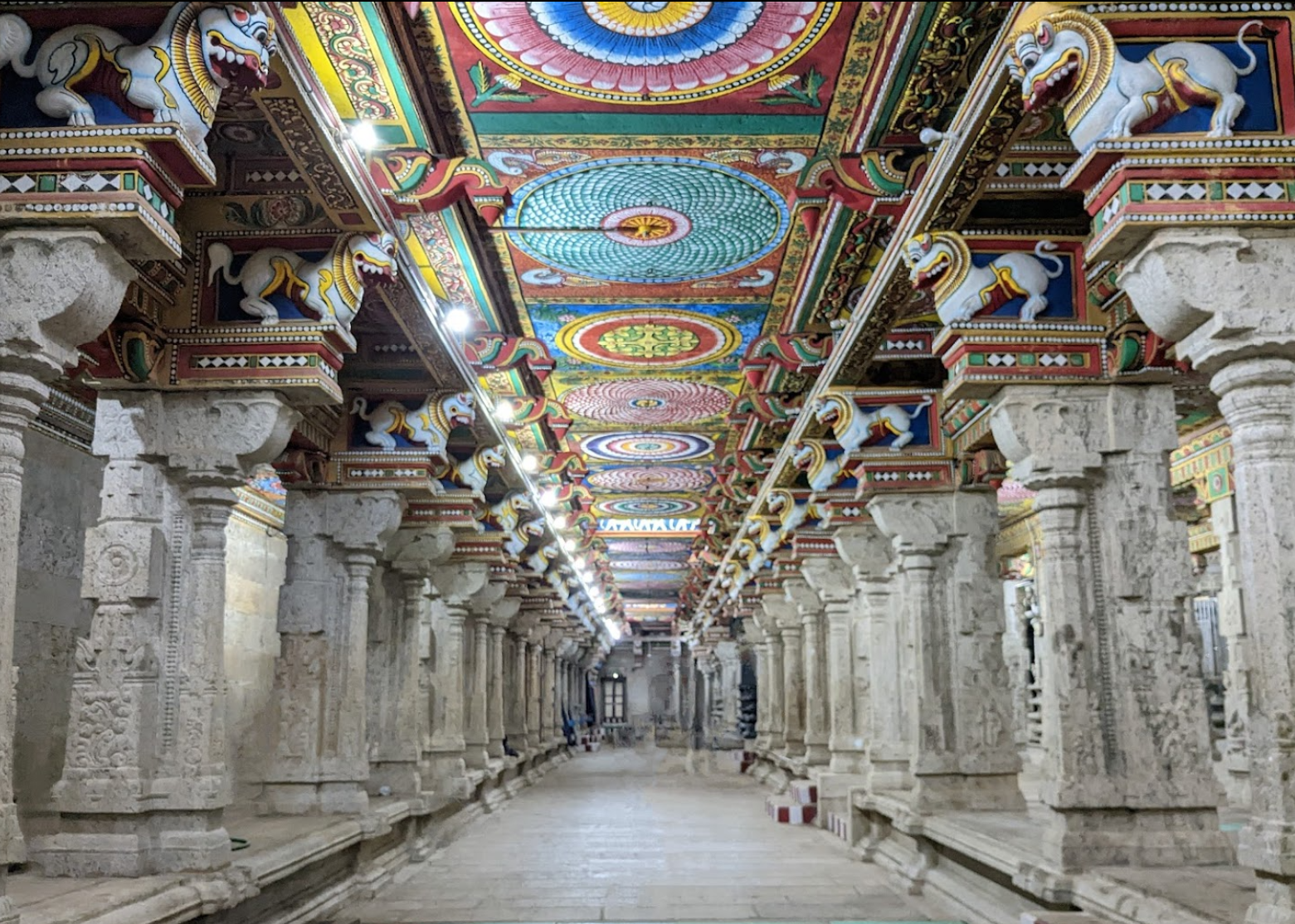
- Vairavar Temple

- Location in Tamil Nadu, India
- Coordinates: 10.31°N 78.44°E
- Country: India
- State: Tamil Nadu
- District: Sivaganga

Population (2011)
  - Total: 824

Languages
  - Official: Tamil
- Time zone: UTC+5:30 (IST)
- Vehicle registration: TN63 TN-
- Nearest city: Karaikudi

Vairavanpatti is a village located on the way from Madurai and Karaikudi in Sivaganga district of Tamil Nadu, India. This village derives its name from the temple dedicated to Lord Kala Bhairav who is known in Tamil language as Vairavan. It is 2 km from the Pillayarpatti village which is another famous pilgrimage center. It is one of the 9 temples held in high esteem by the Nagarathar Chettiar community of Tamil Nadu. The presiding deity here is Lord Valaroli Nathar and his consort Vadivudai Ammai. Bhairavar here is prominent, hence the name Vairavan-patti in Tamil.

It is reachable from Karaikudi old bus stand. All the local buses connecting Tirupattur and Ponnamaravati are stopping in Vairavanpatti.

The village is in the R. Palakurichi panchayat.
