= Kattalai =

Kattalai may refer to:

- Kattalai Amman Temple, Tamil Nadu, India
- Kattalai (film), a 1993 Indian Tamil-language film
- Kattalai, India, village in Tamil Nadu, India

== See also ==
- Aandavan Kattalai (disambiguation)
