= Elur Chetty =

Tamil and Malayalam speaking community, South India

Ezhur Chetty
Languages
- Tamil, Malayalam

Religion
- Hinduism

Related ethnic groups
- Tamil people, Dravidian people

Elur Chetty (also called Elur Chettu or Ezhur Chetty or Ezhoor Chetty) is a [Tamil/ Malayalam] speaking Chettiar community in South India. They are said to have migrated from Kaveripoompattanam in Thanjavur District and settled in Kanyakumari District. They come under the common name of Chetty which includes other communities such as Kottar Chetty, Parakka Chetty, Vellalar Chetty, Pathira Chetty, Valayal Chetty, Pudukottai Vallanattu Chetty, Nattukkottai Chetty, etc. They were once a trading community and were distinct from the other Chetty communities. Later Kottar, Thiruvananthapuram, Therusanamkoppu, Nagercoil, Chennai, Thalakkulam, Eraniel (Melatheru), Tiruchchirappalli, Coimbatore and Madurai.

== Etymology ==
The name is derived from "Ezhu ooru" meaning "seven towns". The seven towns were in and around the Kanyakumari District in South Tamil Nadu, India, namely Eraniel, Thiruvithancode, Padmanabhapuram, Colachel, Ganapathipuram, Midalam, and Parakkai. They are called Keezhatheru Chetty.

== History ==
Ezhur Chetty community were originally residents of Kaveripoompattinam, part of the Chola empire, and were an affluent community involved in sea trade. This ancient town was destroyed by a tsunami around AD 79 August 23/24 and the community members started migrating to other areas after this event.

The trading community left their properties and wealthy life, took their family deities' (Vinayaka & Nagaramman) idols, left the Chola empire and migrated to the Pandiya and Chera Empires across the river Cauveri. Some of the migrated people settled in around 93 places including Karaikudi, Devakkottai, Thiruppur, Kovilpatti, Thazhayoothu, Valliyur and Kottar. The people who reached Kottar did pooja for the Vinayaka idol. After the pooja, when they tried to remove the idol, they were unsuccessful. People who stayed back in Kottar are called Kottar Chetty. Later the Kottar Pillayar Temple was built there.

The rest of them reached Eraniel (formerly Hiranyasimhanallur) near the shore of Valli river. That day was the last Sunday of Chithirai month of Tamil Calendar during the day of aayilyam nakshatra. They placed the Nagaramman (the snake goddess) idol and also idols for Thangammai and Thayammai there. On that night, they made nivedyam (a sweet offering for God) from a mixture of raw rice flour, banana (Matty) fruit, cardamom, dried ginger, coconut and jaggery. This mixture was pressed to form a solid rectangular shape (like a brick), which was then covered using banana and coconut leaves and tied using Kaithai (a plant which produces a very fragrant flower) root. This was baked using coconut husk and served to the god. This came to be known as the 'Odupparai Kolukkattai'. Since then, the Odupparai Nagaramman Temple celebrations are being held to this day and the family and community meet together.

Arulmigu Thangammai-Thayammai

The community members then met the Chera King and sought permission to conduct trade. Trading then commenced, with Eraniel as the base, covering Ganapathipuram (Pazhaya Kadai), Parakkai, Colachel, Midalam, Thiruvithancode and Padmanabhapuram. Hence they were called Ezhur (meaning '7 towns') Chetty community.

The earliest known people from the community who settled in Eraniel were Umayammai and Pitcha Pillai (descendant of Unnaamalai). Their offspring are Kolappa Pillai, Subramonia Pillai and Sivathanu Pillai.

== Classification ==
Elur Chetty was classified under Other Backward Class (OBC) in Tamil Nadu (in Kanyakumari District) and Kerala as per Mandal Commission.

== Temples ==
Odupparai Nagaramman Temple is the community temple of Elur Chetty community. The temple is situated near Eraniel (Hiranyasimha nallur). Monthly poojas are carried out on the last Sunday of the Tamil calendar.

Kottar Desia Vinayagar Temple is the community temple of Kottar Chetty Community. The temple is situated on the centre of the Nagercoil Town at Chettikulam and managed by Trustees of Desia Vinayagar Devasthanam and trustees are elected by the male members of the Kottar Chetty. Daily and Vishesa Poojas are carried by Trustees. The temple owns vast areas of land and properties in the Nagercoil Town.

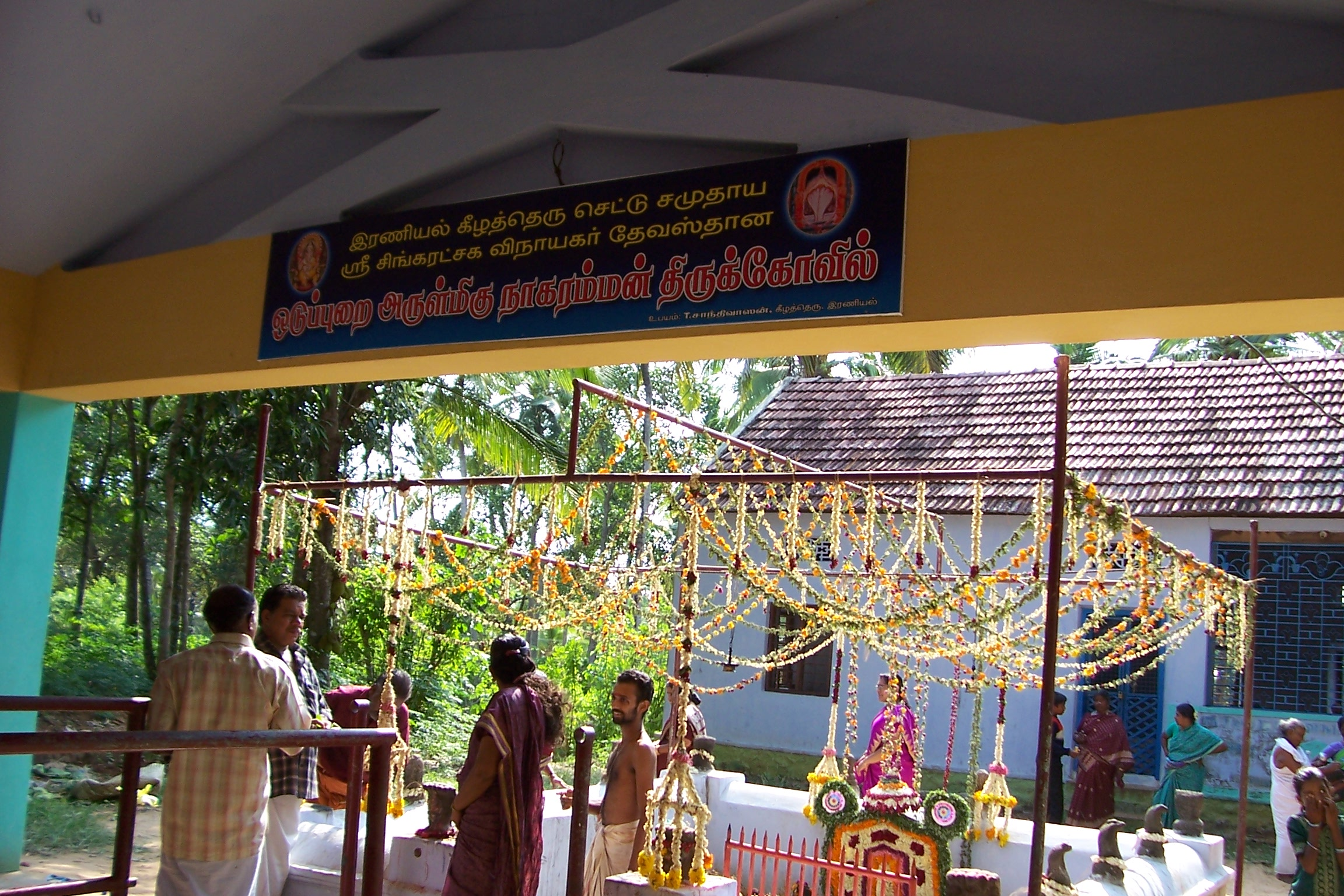
Oduppurai Nagaramman Temple

Kattalai Nagaramman Temple is another temple of the community.
