= Nagarathar =

Hindu mercantile caste

நகரத்தார்
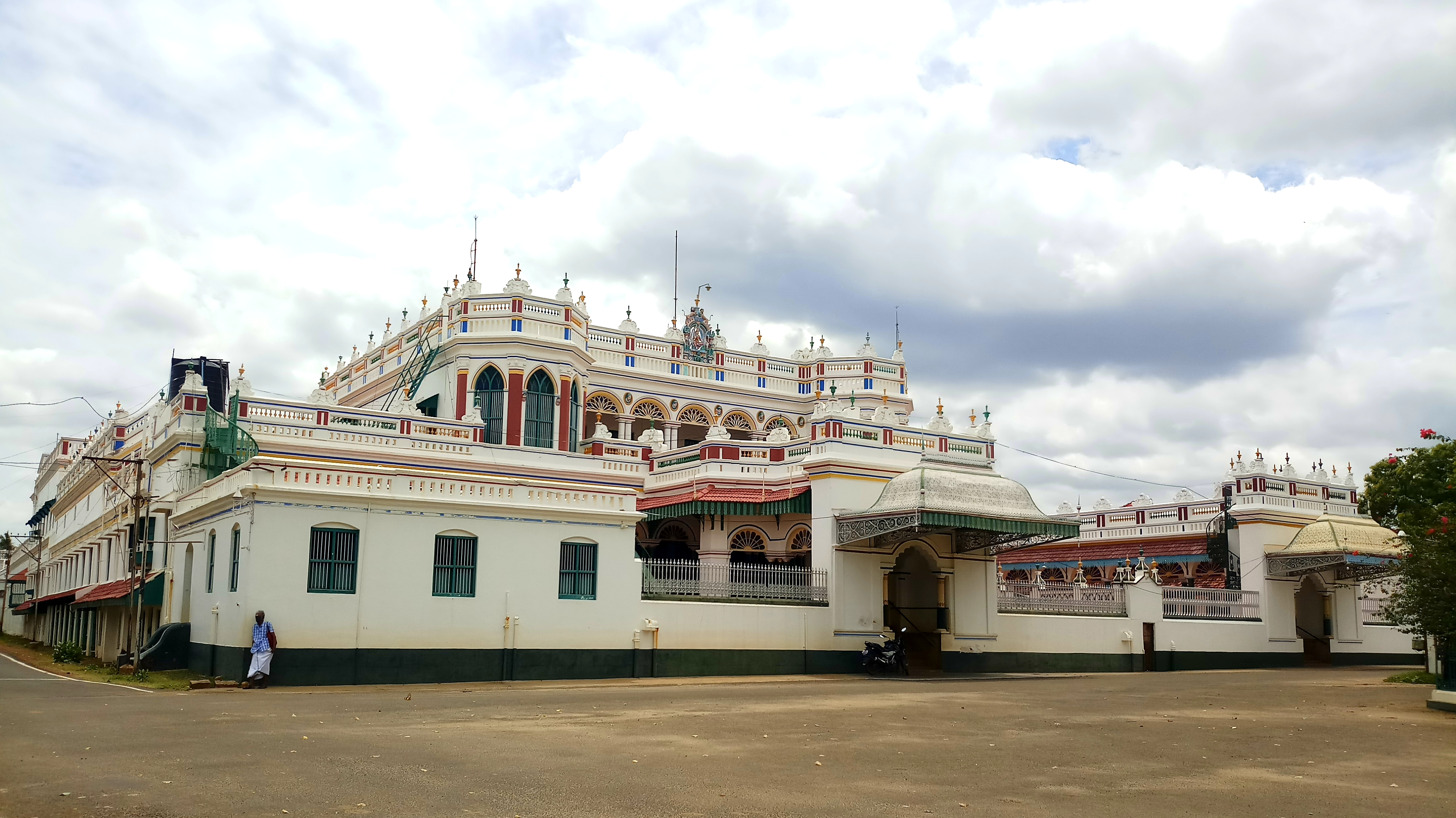

Total population
- c. 75,000–1,00,000 (Note: This number is for the population of Nattukottai Nagarathars. The exact population of the other Nagarathar communities is unknown.)

Regions with significant populations
- India: Chettinad region of Tamil Nadu, Chennai

Languages
- Tamil

Related ethnic groups
- Tamil people

Nagarathar (நகரத்தார்) is a Tamil caste found native in Tamil Nadu, India. The Nagarathar community was not originally a single caste, but developed from an assortment of related sub-castes, which over time became known under the umbrella term Nagarathar.

Notable castes that use the name Nagarathar include: Nattukottai Nagarathar, Aruviyur Nagarathar, Uruthikottai Nagarathar, Elur Chetty Nagarathar, Vallanattu Nagarathar Chettiar, Sundarapattina Nagarathar, Muraiyur Nagarathar, Attangudi Nagarathar, Palaaiyapatti Nagarathar, Dhanavanikar Nagarathar, Nattarasankottai Nagarathar, 96 Oor Nagarathar and Naana Desikal.

A few subsects of the Nagarathar community, such as the Nattukottai Nagarathar, were traditionally wealthy landlords and money lenders. Nagarathars are a mercantile community who are traditionally involved in commerce, banking and money lending. They use the title Chettiar and are traditionally concentrated in modern region Chettinad. They are prominent philanthropists who funded and built several Hindu temples, choultries, schools, colleges and universities.

== Etymology ==
The term Nagarathar literally means "town-dweller".

Nattukottai Nagarathars are also known as Nattukottai Chettiar. The term Nattukottai literally means "country-fort" in reference to their fort-like mansions. Their title, Chettiar, is a generic term used by several mercantile groups which is derived from the ancient Tamil term etti (bestowed on merchants by the Tamil monarchs).

== History ==
Nattukottai Nagarathars were originally from the ancient land of Naganadu, which is believed to be destroyed (either in an earthquake or floods) and this place was either north or northwest of Kanchipuram.

Nagarathars migrated and lived in the following places:

· Kanchipuram (Thondai Nadu) – From 2897 BC for about 2100 years

· Kaveripoompatinam (Poompuhar), the capital of the early (Chola Kingdom) – From 789 BC for about 1400 years.

· Karaikudi (Pandiya Kingdom) – From 707 AD onwards.

When they were in Naganadu these Dhana Vaishyas had three different divisions:

1. Aaru (Six) Vazhiyar

2. Ezhu (Seven) Vazhiyar

3. Nangu (Four) Vazhiyar

All these three divisions were devoted to Maragatha Vinayagar. Only after they migrated to the Pandya Kingdom they were called as Ariyurar, Ilayatrangudiyar, and Sundrapattanathar. They celebrate Pillaiyar Nonbu in honor of Vinayagar based on the communal legend that their ancestors got lost at sea at Kaveripoompatinam and prayed for 21 days before reaching a shore.

Nagarathars of Ilayatrangudiyar were later called as Nattukottai Nagarathar. Ariyurar (Aruviyur) Nagarathars further split into 3 divisions: Vadakku Valavu (North), Therku Valavu (South) and Elur Chetty. Sundrapattanathar Nagarathars migrated to Kollam district in Kerala and their history is completely lost now since there was no record keeping.

The Nattukkottai Nagarathars were originally salt traders and historically an itinerant community of merchants and claim Chettinad as their traditional home. How they reached that place, which at the time comprised adjacent parts of the ancient states of Pudukkottai, Ramnad and Sivagangai, is uncertain, with various legends being recorded. There are various claims regarding how they arrived in that area. Among those are a claim that they were driven there because of persecution by a Chola king named Poovandhi Cholan whilst another states that they left due to Poombuhar's proximity to the sea when the city was destroyed. There are also several legends about the decline in female population prior to moving to the Pandya kindgdom leading to many unmarried men, who were eventually allowed to marry Vellalar women. No more details are clear about this story and as to why the Nagarathar left the Chola kingdom and moved away from Kaveripoompattinam to the Pandya kingdom.

Another older one, recounted to Edgar Thurston, that they were encouraged to go there by a Pandyan king who wanted to take advantage of their trading skills. The legends converge in saying that they obtained the use of nine temples, with each representing one exogamous part of the community.

The traditional base of the Nattukottai Nagarathars is the Chettinad region of the present-day state of Tamil Nadu. It comprises a triangular area around northeast Sivagangai, northwest Ramnad and south Pudukkottai.

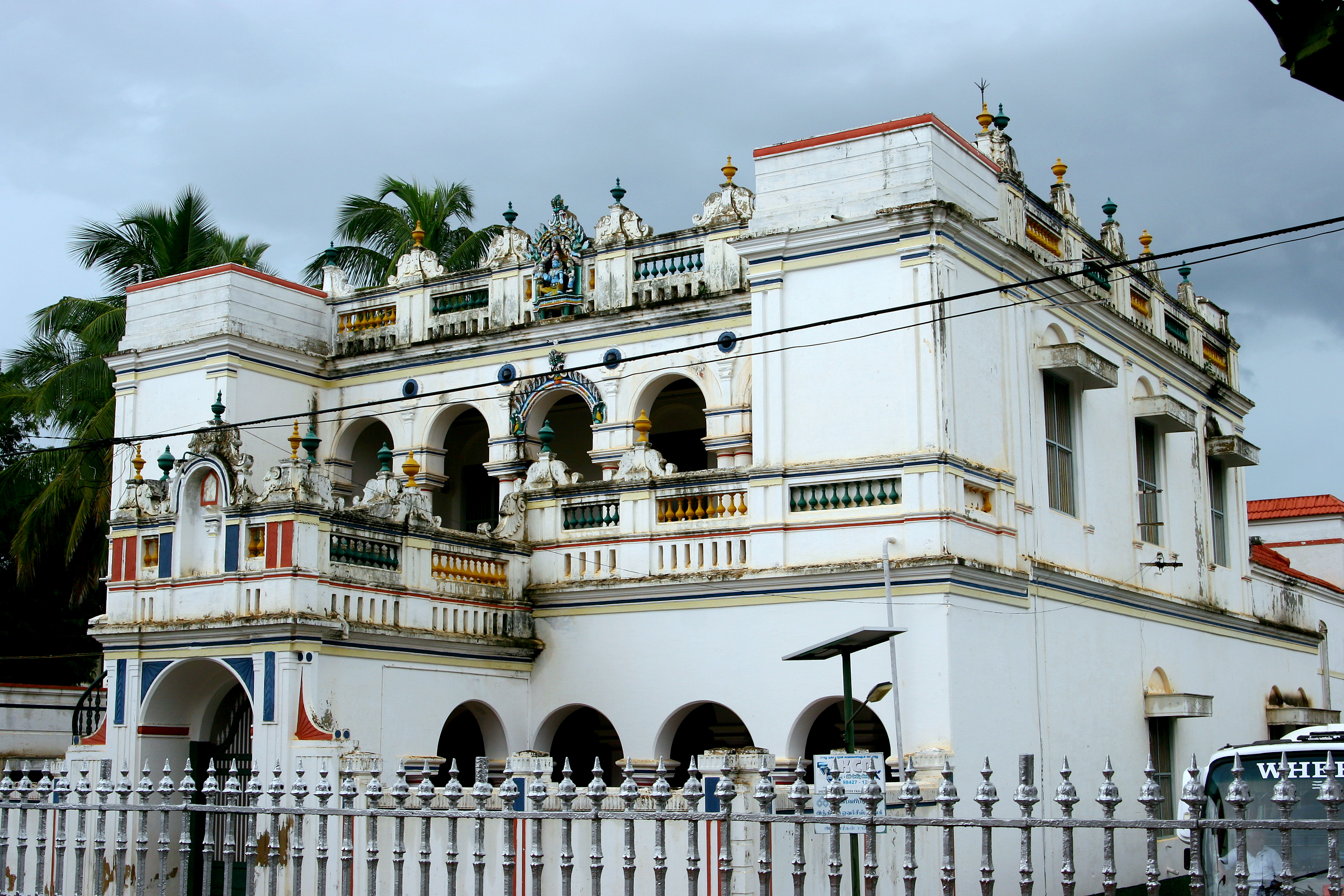
They have a reputation for living in characteristic mansions in Chettinad. These were constructed between the late 18th and the early 20th centuries.

They may have become maritime traders as far back as the 8th century CE. They were trading in salt and by the 17th century, European expansionism in South East Asia during the next century fostered conditions that enabled the community to expand its trading enterprises, including as moneylenders, thereafter. By the late 18th century expanded them to inland and coastal trade in cotton and rice.

In the 19th century, following the Permanent Settlement, some in the Nagarathar community wielded considerable influence in the affairs of the zamindar (landowners) elite. There had traditionally been a relationship between royalty and the community based on the premise that providing worthy service to royalty would result in the granting of high honours but this changed as the landowners increasingly needed to borrow money from the community in order to fight legal battles designed to retain their property and powers. Nagarathars provided that money as mortgaged loans but by the middle of the century they were becoming far less tolerant of any defaults and were insisting that failure to pay as arranged would result in the mortgaged properties being forfeited. By the 19th century were their business activities developed into a sophisticated banking system, with their business expanding to parts of South and Southeast Asian countries such as Sri Lanka, Myanmar, Malaysia, Singapore, Indonesia, and Vietnam.

=== Varna classification ===
In the absence of a proper chaturvarna (four-fold varna) system in South India, the Nattukottai Nagarathars (also known as Chettiars) have been classified as high-class Vaishyas (merchant caste) due to their extensive involvement in trade, finance, and banking activities. Their economic prominence and wealth elevated their social status, and they were often considered above Brahmins in certain contexts.

In addition to their economic prominence, the Nattukottai Nagarathars have been renowned for their philanthropic contributions to religious and social causes. They donated generously to the construction, renovation, and maintenance of numerous Shiva and Vishnu temples across Tamil Nadu and other regions, leaving a lasting legacy in the religious and cultural heritage of South India. This charitable tradition further elevated their social standing and cemented their role as patrons of South Indian religious institutions.

Furthermore, some Nattukottai Nagarathars ascended to kingship through their wealth and influence. Although kings are traditionally associated with the Kshatriya varna in the chaturvarna system, the Nattukottai Nagarathars' rise to power was based on their economic achievements rather than hereditary lineage.

=== Community divisions or clans ===
The nine Hindu temples connected with the Nattukottai Nagarathar community that were built in the 8th century include: Ilayathangudi, Iluppaikudi, Iraniyur, Mathur, Nemam, Pillayarpatti, Soorakudi, Vairavan, and Velangudi. Each temple maintains a count of the number of families associated with it called pulli. Marriage between members of the same temple (pangali) is not allowed. Ilayathangudi and Mathur temples have divisions (pirivu), which allows people of different divisions of the same temple to get married. Vairavan temple also has divisions but does not follow this rule. Members of Iraniyur and Pillayarpatti cannot intermarry since they are considered family after a pair of brothers were split between the two temples during the 13th century.

== Famous personalities ==
- Kannagi, a symbol (goddess) of chastity
- Iyarpagai Nayanar, a Nayanar saint (third in the list of 63)
- Murthi Nayanar, a Nayanar saint (fifteenth in the list of 63)
- Pattinathar, a philosopher and ascetic who belonged to the 10th or 14th century CE
- Karaikkal Ammaiyar, a Saivite saint and one of the 63 Nayanmars
- S. Rm. M. Annamalai Chettiar, Raja of Chettinad
- Alagappa Chettiar, businessman and philanthropist
- A. Nagappa Chettiar, an industrialist and one of the pioneers of the Indian leather industry
- A. C. Muthiah, Indian industrialist
- Kannadasan, famous poet and cinema lyricist
- Karumuttu Thiagarajan Chettiar, businessman
- R. M. Pitchappan, a biologist known for his studies on immunogenetics and infectious diseases.
- A. M. M. Murugappa Chettiar, founder of Murugappa Group
- A. V. Meiyappan, founder of AVM Productions and one of the pioneers of Tamil cinema
- A. K. Chettiar, a pioneer in travelogue writing in Tamil
- Azha Valliappa, a great contributor to children's literature in Tamil
- Rama.Periyakaruppan (Thamizhannal), one of the notable Tamil personalities of the 20th century
