= Ilayathangudi =

- Village
- Location in Tamil Nadu, India
- Coordinates: 10.20°N 78.65°E
- Country: India
- State: Tamil Nadu
- District: Sivaganga

Languages
  - Official: Tamil
- Time zone: UTC+5:30 (IST)
- Vehicle registration: TN63 TN-
- Nearest city: Tirupathur

Ilayathangudi is a village located near Tirupathur in the Sivaganga district of Tamil Nadu. It is famous for Kailasanathar Nithyakalyani Temple which is one of the nine temples held in esteem by the Chettinad Nagarathar community.

It also has the Adhistanam temple of the 65th Shankaracharya of the Kanchi Matha, Pujyasri Sudarsana Mahadevendra Saraswati.
