= Chettiar =

South Indian title

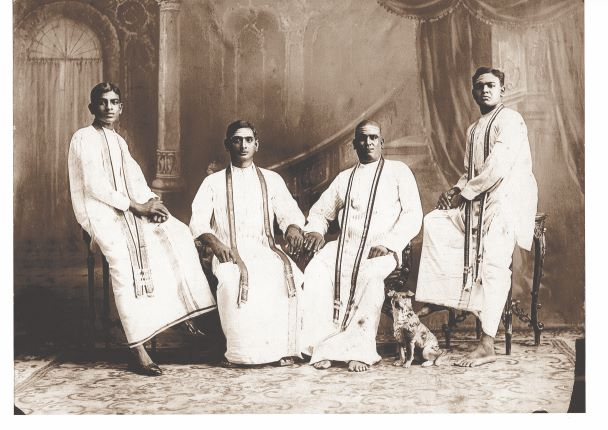
Chettiars in traditional attire, 1920s

Chettiar (also spelt as Chetti and Chetty) is a title used by many trading, weaving, agricultural and land-owning castes in South India, especially in the Indian states of Tamil Nadu, Kerala and Karnataka.

== Etymology ==
Chettiar/Chetty is derived from the Sanskrit word Śreṣṭha (Devanagari: श्रेष्ठ) or Śreṣṭhin (Devanagari: श्रेष्ठीन्), meaning superior. This term was later Prakritised as Seṭhī (Devanagari: सेठी), and eventually became Śeṭ (Devanagari: शेट) or Śeṭī (Devanagari: शेटी) in modern Indo-Aryan dialects.

In early Indian literature, the term referred to a wealthy class of merchants associated with the Vysya varna.

== Subcastes ==
Subcastes of Chettiar include Tattan, Ahamutti, Akkuvari, Atta, Bal, Chavala, Cheda, Chedaya, Chunnamba, Eruma, Etanatan, Indrakula, Kachi, Kalluli, Kannada, Kannan, Karakkatta, Karinkal, Karuvala, Kava, Kottanna, Kuda, Kuduma, Kudumbi, Kumbala, Kurikkal, Linga, Malappada, Malayan, Mavuntadan, Mupayara, Nagarath, Pannia, Pappada, Patta, Pattu Kudi, Pilla, Purur, Sola, Tachchani, Tatta, Thappurni, Thayan, Therur, Thoramar, Thunur, Torayar, Uppara, Vadayakkaren, Valaya, Vaniya, Vanni, Vayanatan, Vettila, Vila, Vypara, Vysyajini, and Nul.

== Historical significance ==
The Chettiar title has been associated with a diverse range of communities, including merchant groups, agriculturalists, and artisans. The title is also used by certain subgroups of the Vellalar caste, highlighting its adaptability across regions and professions.

During the colonial era, Chettiars, particularly the Nattukottai Nagarathar (Chettiyar), Aruviyur Nagarathar (Chettiyar), gained recognition as prominent bankers and financiers in South India and Southeast Asia.

== Economic and cultural contributions ==
=== Commerce and finance ===
The Nattukottai Chettiars established a sophisticated banking system, introducing financial instruments like the hundi (promissory note) and developing credit networks that extended from colonial India to Burma (Myanmar), Malaysia, and Singapore. Their financial expertise earned them a reputation as the "bankers of the East" during the British Raj.

=== Agriculture and textiles ===
In addition to their achievements in commerce, several Chettiar subgroups were engaged in agriculture and textile production. The Vellalar Chettiars (vellan Chettis) were historically known as agrarian landlords and also involved in trading and merchanting, while others, like the Devanga Chettiars, excelled in weaving fine textiles. The Kandangi sari, a traditional handloom product, is an enduring symbol of their craftsmanship.

=== Philanthropy and religion ===
The Chettiars are celebrated for their philanthropic endeavors. They funded schools, hospitals, and temples, many of which remain significant cultural landmarks. Prominent temples such as the Pillaiyarpatti Temple and the Kundrakudi Temple in Tamil Nadu are linked to Chettiar patronage. Their generosity extended beyond India, contributing to infrastructure and religious institutions in Southeast Asia.

=== Cuisine ===
The Nagarathar Chettiars of Tamil Nadu are renowned for their cuisine, known as Chettinad cuisine.

== See also ==
- Nagarathar
- Pattanavar
- Pattusali
- Twenty four Manai Telugu Chettiars
- Vallanattu Chettiar
- Vanniyar
- Vellalar chettiars
