= Azha Valliappa =

Tamil children's literature poet (1922–1989)

Kuzhandai Kavignar Azha Valliappa
- அழ. வள்ளியப்பா
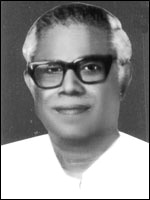
- Born: 7 November 1922; Rayavaram, Madras Presidency
- Died: 16 March 1989 (aged 66); Chennai, Tamil Nadu
- Writing career
- Notable works: Malarum Ullam; Nalla Nanban; Pattile Gandhi; Sinnanchiru Vayathil Periyar Vazhivil; Pillai Paruvathele

Azha Valliappa or A. Valliyappa (7 November 1922 – 16 March 1989), popularly known as Kuzhandai Kavignar, was an Indian poet recognized for his contributions to children's literature in Tamil.

== Biography ==
Valliappa was born on 7 November 1922 in Rayavaram, Pudukkottai district (then part of Madras Presidency), to Alagappa Chettiar and Umaiyal Aachi. At the age of five, he was adopted. Valliappa attended S.K.T. Gandhi Primary School in Rayavaram and later studied at S.B.F. High School in Ramachandrapuram. Financial constraints prevented him from pursuing higher education.

In 1940, Valliappa began working as a cashier at the Sakthi newspaper in Madras. His first published story was Aalukku Paathi. In 1941, he left Sakthi to join Indian Bank, where he continued writing poetry and articles while fulfilling his professional responsibilities.

Valliappa's first book, Malarum Ullam, was published in 1944. A decade later, in 1954, this work won both State and National Awards. His book Nalla Nanban also received a State Award for children's literature. In 1970, his work Pattile Gandhi earned him the National Award. Additionally, his books Sinnanchiru Vayathil Periyar Vazhivil and Pillai Paruvathele were recognized with State Awards for their contributions to children's literature.

In April 1950, Valliappa established the Kuzhandai Ezhuthalar Sangam (Children's Writers’ Association) to promote reading habits among children and ensure the availability of reading material tailored for them. Notably, this association was formed nine months before the establishment of a Tamil writers’ association. He held various leadership roles within the organization, including secretary and president. From 1951 to 1954, he served as the editor of Pooncholai. Throughout his career, he edited publications such as Baalar Malar, Damaaram, and Sangu. He also edited Gokulam, a children's magazine, from 1983 to 1987.

Madurai Kamaraj University honoured Valliappa with the title Tamil Peravai Semmal in 1982 and granted him life membership in its academic council. In the same year, a biography titled Children’s Poet Valliyappa by Dr. Poovannan was published.

== Death ==
Valliappa died on 16 March 1989. His birthday, 7 November, is celebrated annually as Children's Literature Day.
