= Rayavaram, Tamil Nadu =

Village in India

Rayavaram
- village Panchayat
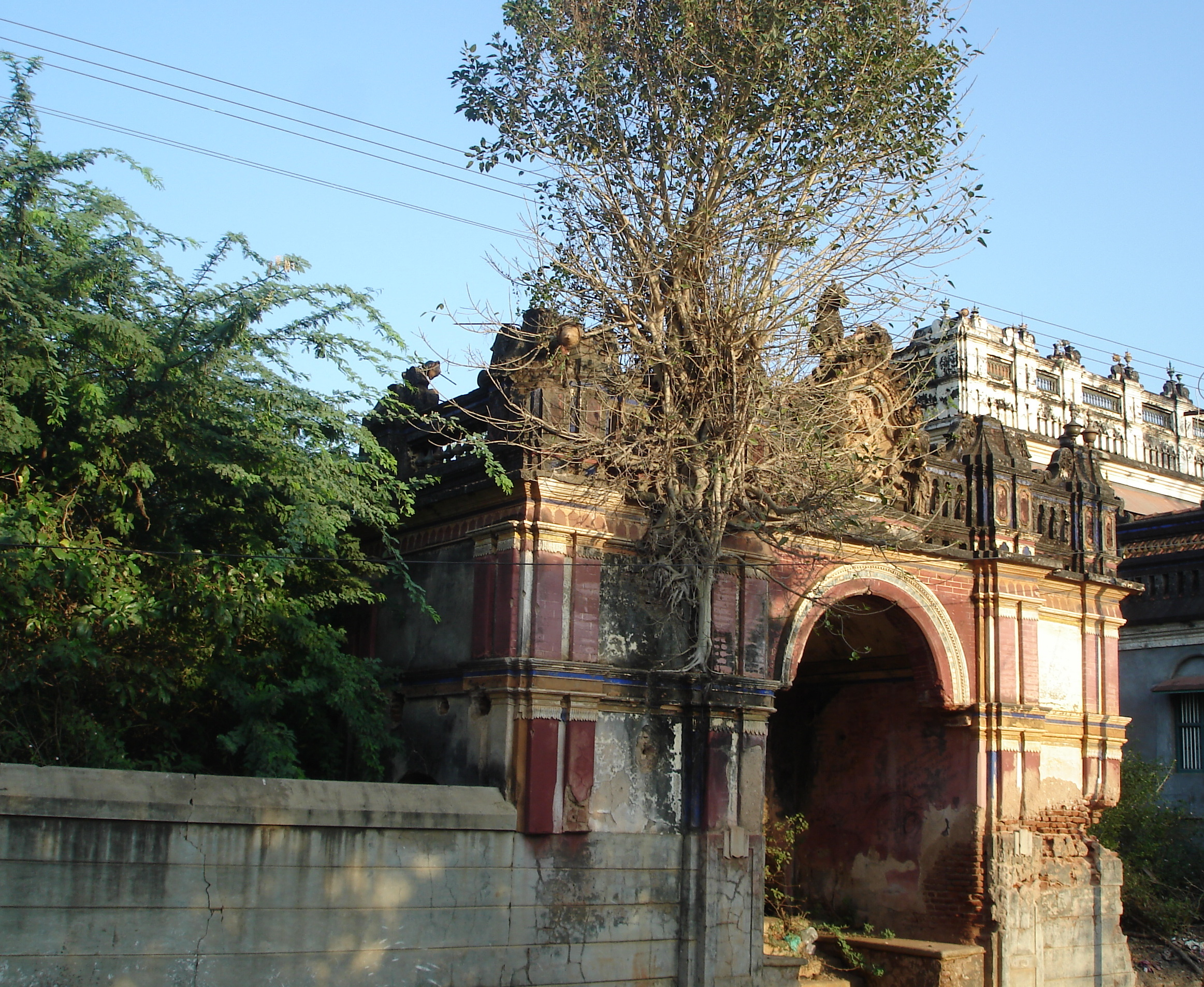
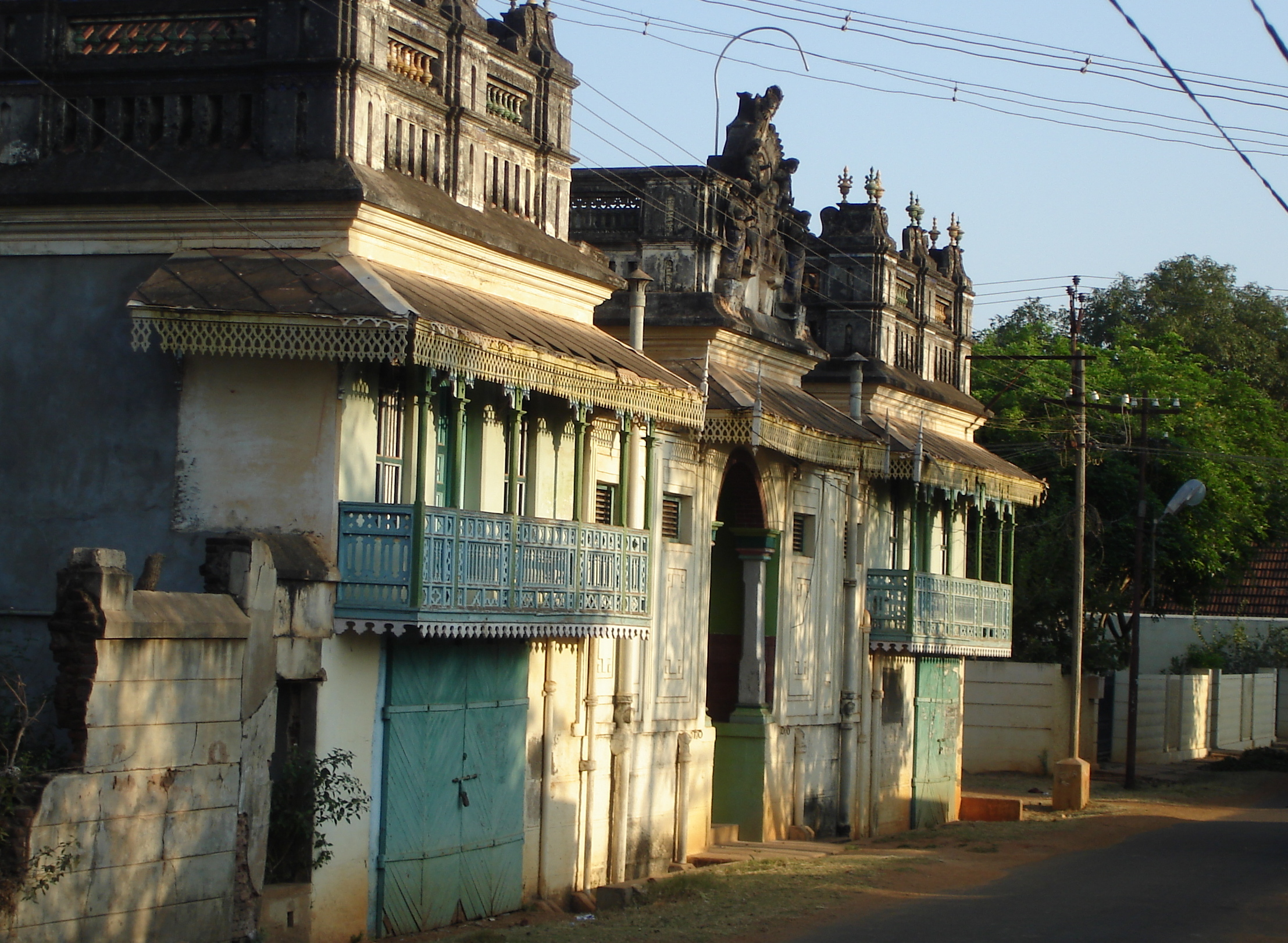
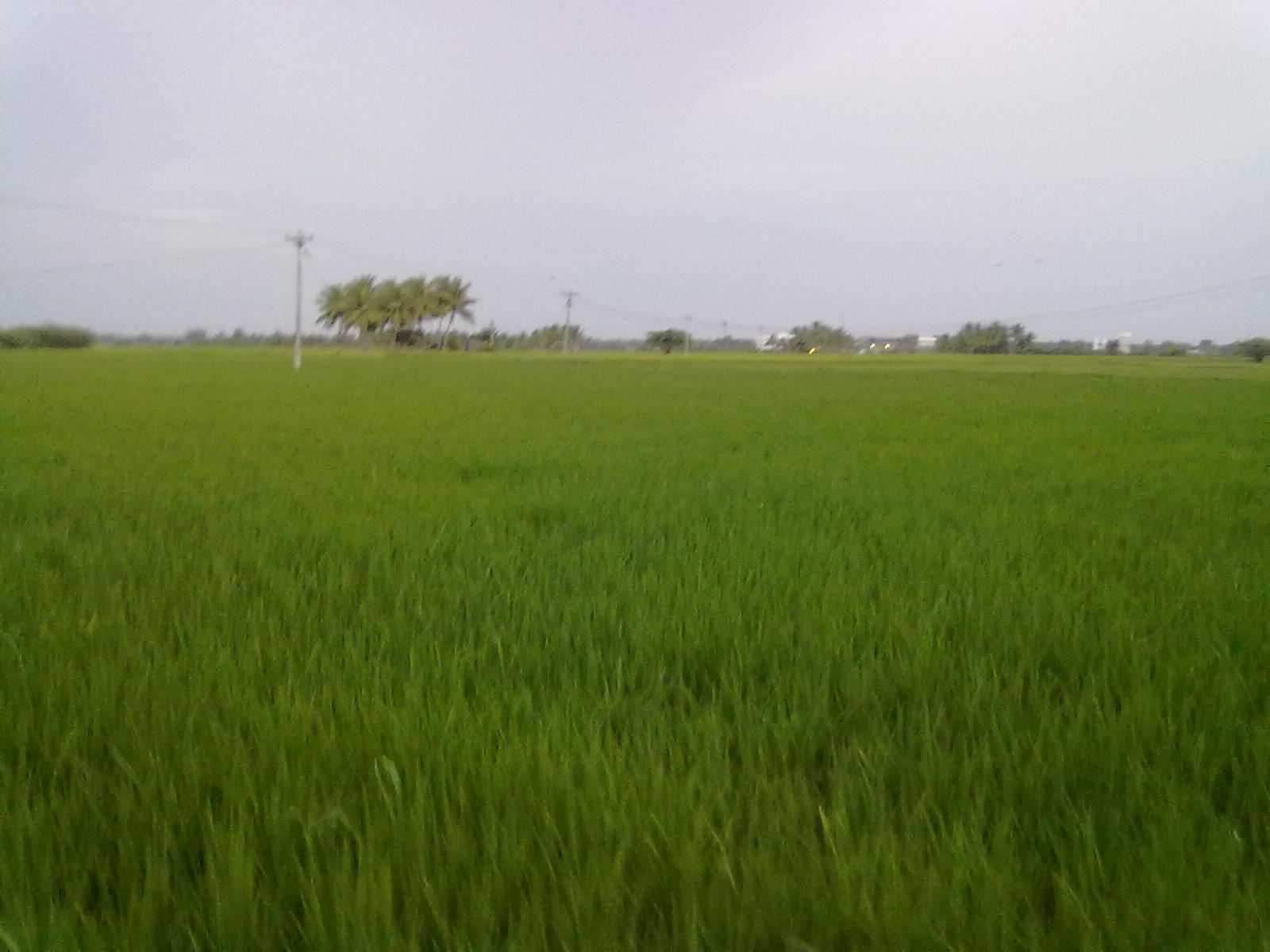
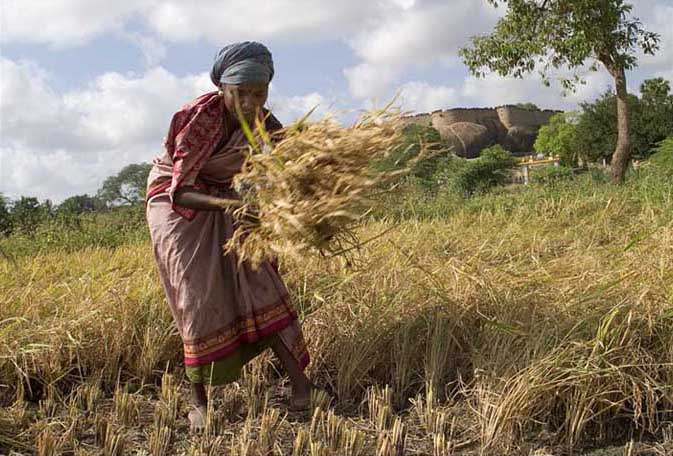
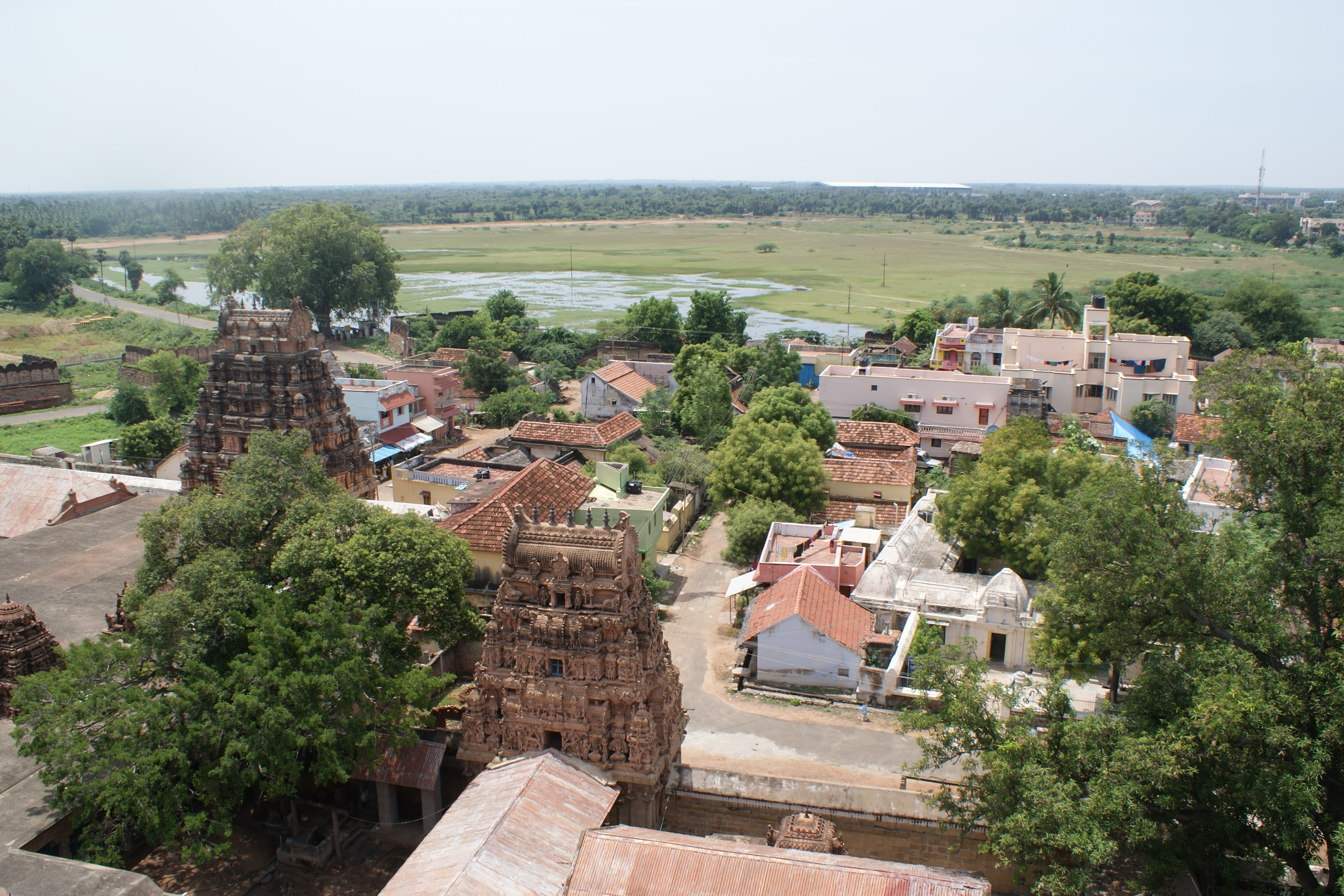
- Nicknames: Chetinad, Nagarathar
- Location within Tamil Nadu Location within India
- Coordinates: 10.25°N 78.81°E
- Country: India
- State: Tamil Nadu
- District: Pudukkottai

Government
  - Type: Village Panchayat

Population (2011)
  - Total: 14,643

Languages
  - Official: Tamil, English
- Time zone: UTC+5:30 (IST)
- PIN: 622 506
- Telephone code: 914333
- Vehicle registration: TN 55
- Website: www.rayavaram.gov.in

Rayavaram is a village Panchayat in Pudukkottai district in Tamil Nadu, India.

== Geography ==
Rayavaram lies 72 kilometres (45 mi) south of Tiruchirappalli and 90 kilometres (56 mi) north of Madurai. The nearest town is Pudukkottai. The closest airport is at Tiruchirappalli. It is well connected by road and has at least 75 buses covering surrounding areas.

The village's economy is based on agriculture.

== Demographics ==
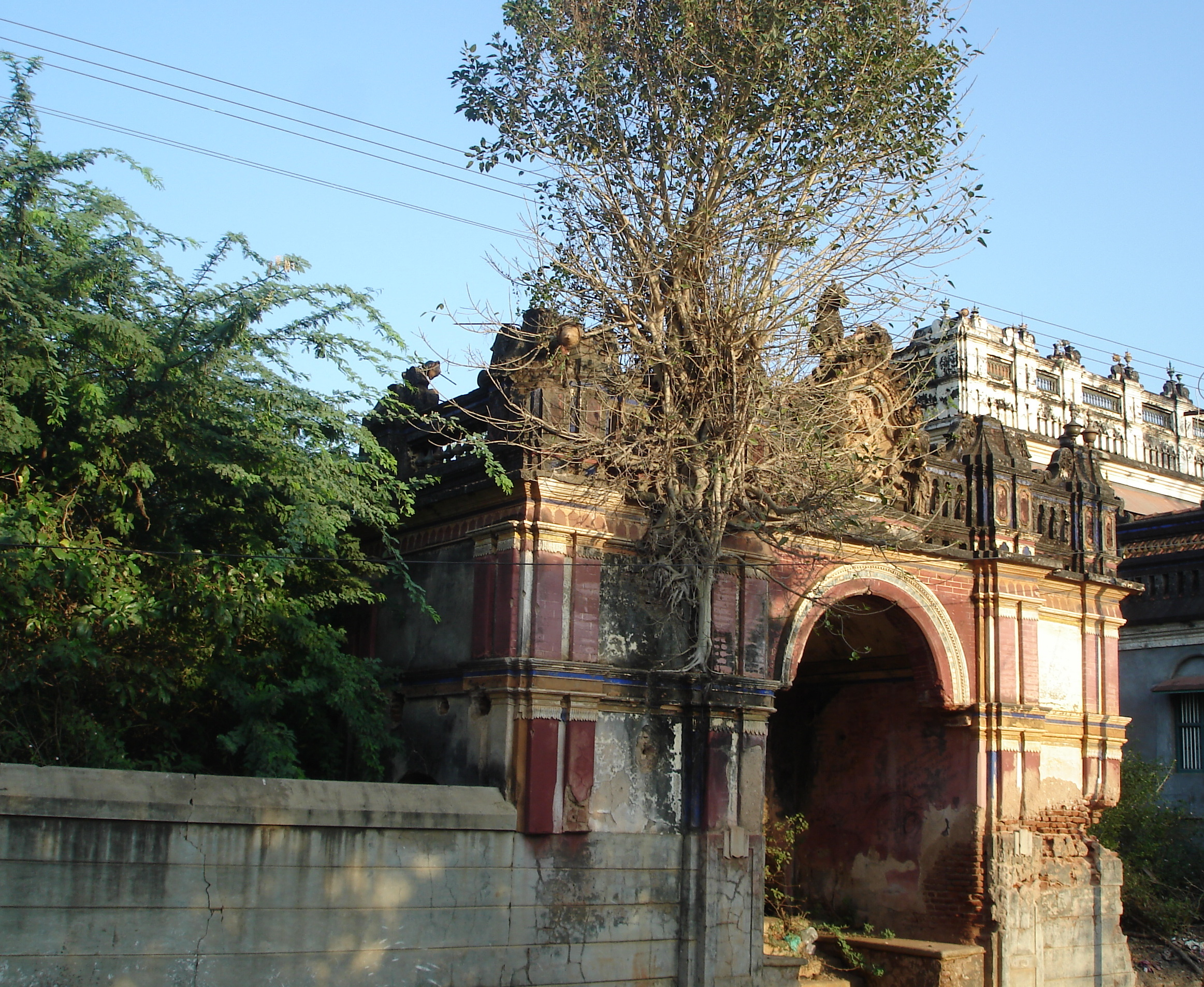
An old building in front of the Vena Moona House

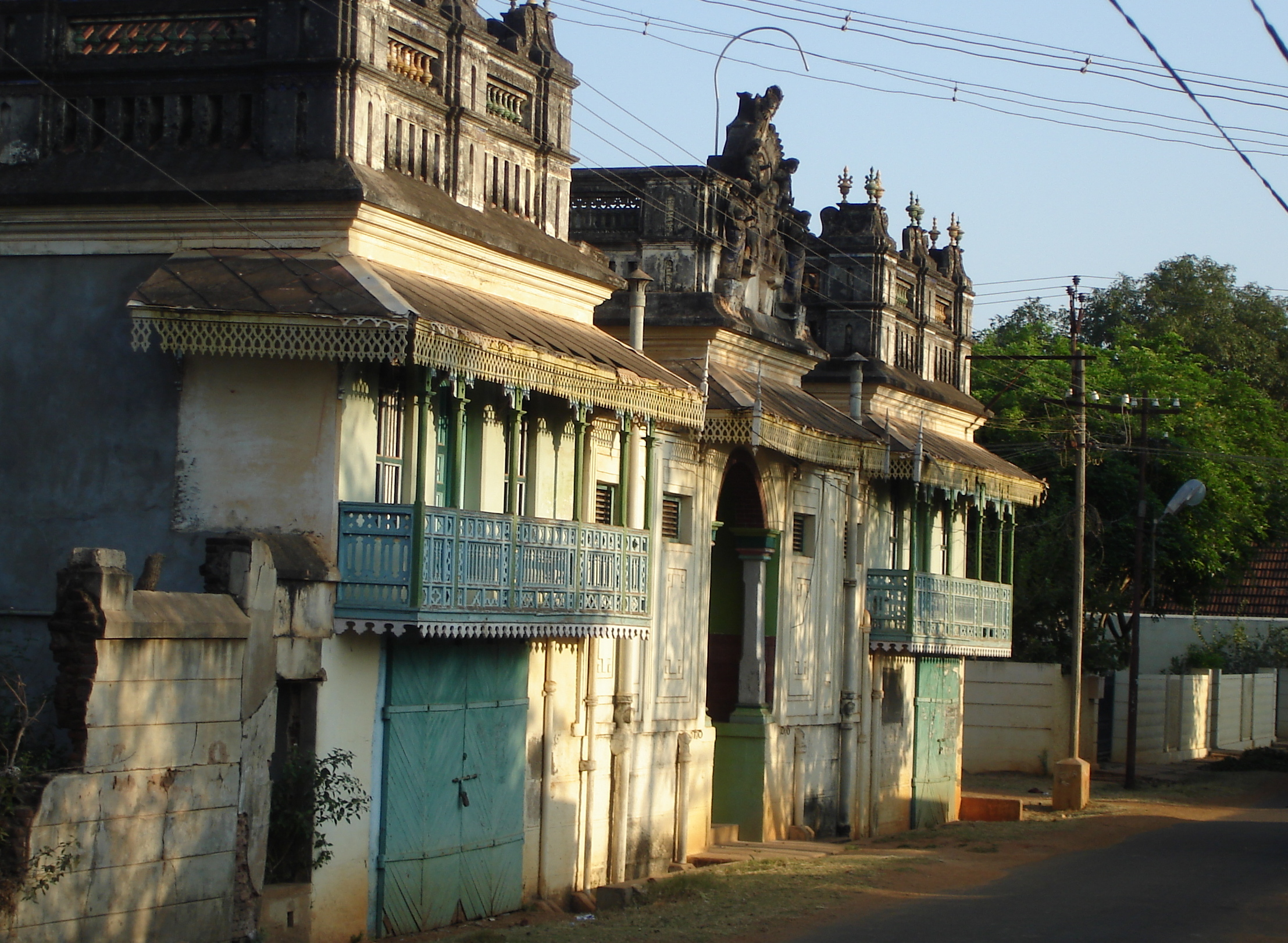
The Street where Vena Moona House is located

As of 2001, Rayavaram had a population of 14,643. Males constituted 49% of the population and females 51%. Rayavaram had an average literacy rate of 75%, higher than the national average of 59.5%; with 54% of the males and 46% of females literate. 12% of the population was under 6 years of age.

== Transport ==
Rayavaram had well connected with road. Bus station had Provided to travel with Thirumayam, Pudukkottai, Karaikudi, Sivaganga, Aranthangi, Arimalam, Devakottai, Dindigal, Thiruchirapalli, Coimbatore, Madurai and Chennai.

The Nearest Railway stations is Thirumayam and Pudukkottai railway station. The Nearest Airport is Tiruchirappalli International Airport and Madurai International Airport.

== Temple ==
Shivan temple at Rayavaram

1. Rock Cut Shiva Temple Kottaiyur Rayavaram
2. Muthumari Amman Temple
3. Iththimaraththu Vinayakar Temple
4. Shivan Temple
5. Perumal Temple
6. Malaikuluthu Rock Cut Shiva Temple
7. Anjinear Temple
8. Ayyanar Temple
9. Lingaththu Urani Shivan Temple
10. Maha Ganapathi Temple (Kayilai)
11. Senkeerai Munnodi Karuppar Temple
12. Senkeerai Ayyanaar Temple
13. Senkeerai Chelli Amman Temple
14. Senkeerai Pattan Kovil
15. Senkeerai Adaikkalam Kattar Kovil
16. Senkeerai Ulagikalli Kovil
17. Senkeerai Shri Sivan Kovil
18. Sengeerai Meenachi Amman Koil
19. Muni Kovil
20. Maavadi Karuppar Aalayam
21. Sonaiyakaruppar Kovil
22. Uyyavanthamman kovil
23. Velathudai Ayyanar Temple
24. Senkidai Karuppar Koyil
25. Pattavan Kovil
26. Kalliyanaachi Amman Kovil
27. Arulmigu Kaada Moorthi Ayyanar, Arulmigu Kulavaai Karuppar Aalayam
28. Ponni Kali Amman Kovil
29. Ulagamkaathan Vinayagar Kovil
30. Umaiyambigai Kovil
31. Kaluththaruppan Kaali Kovil
32. Ayingudi Ayyanaar Kovil
