= Aandavan =

Aandavan may refer to:

- Aatank Hi Aatank, a 1995 Bollywood film, dubbed into Tamil in 2000 as Aandavan
- Aandavan (2008 film), a 2008 Malayalam language film

== See also ==
- Aandavan Kattalai (disambiguation)
