= Aandavan Kattalai =

Aandavan Kattalai (lit. 'Command of the Lord') may refer to:

- Aandavan Kattalai (1964 film), an Indian Tamil-language film
- Aandavan Kattalai (2016 film), an Indian Tamil-language film

== See also ==
- Aandavan (disambiguation)
- Kattalai (disambiguation)
