= Kattalai Amman Temple =

Hindu temple in Tamil Nadu, India

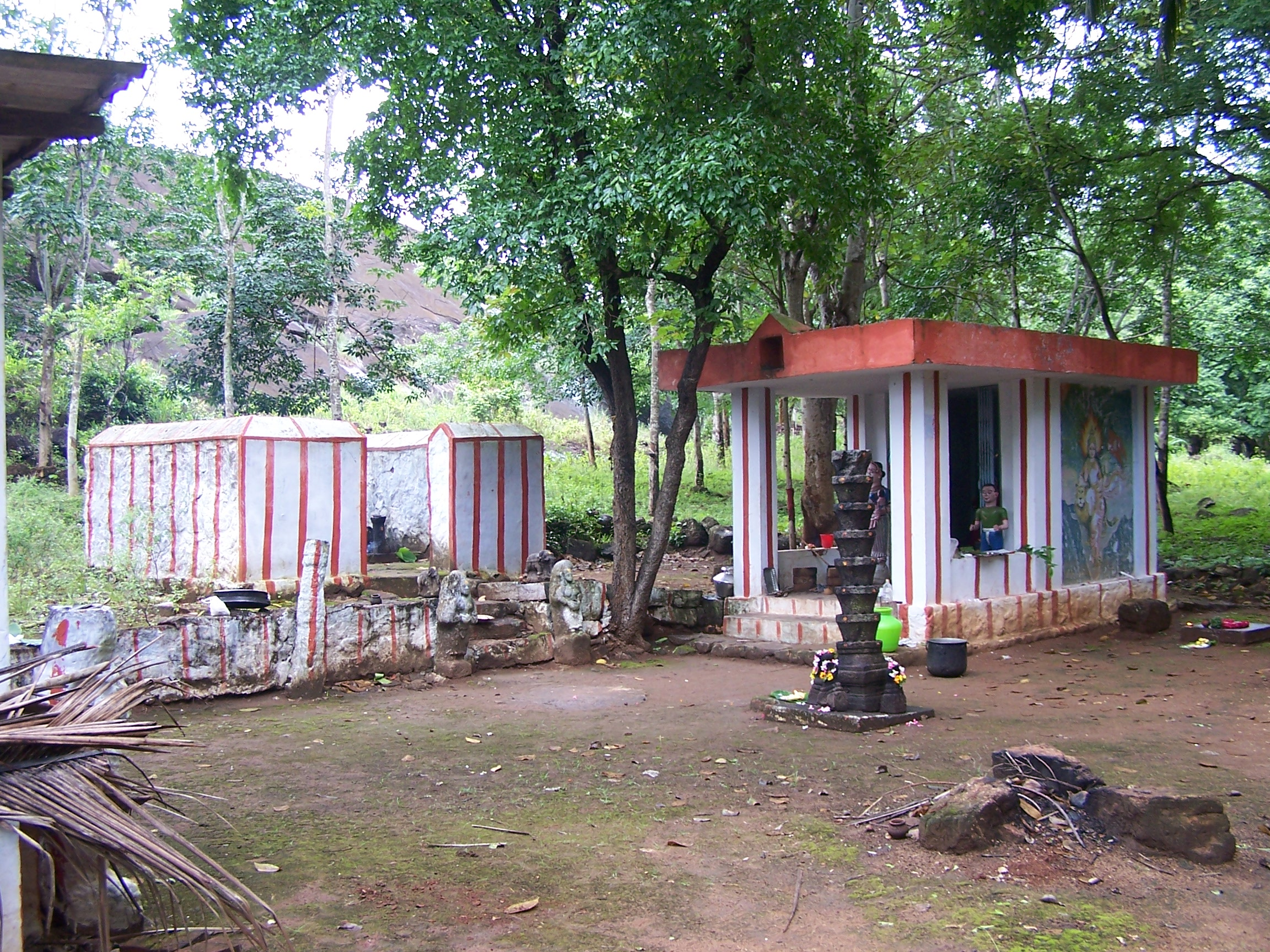
The Main Temple

Kattalai Amman Temple is a Hindu Temple situated in Kanyakumari District at the southern part of Tamil Nadu, India. The temple is located in the village, surrounded by mountains and canals. The temple was known originally as Irumpudayaan Kandan Sasthan kovil.

The current temple complex was built in 1981 and the first Amman Kudai Vizha (annual celebration of the Devi) was conducted on 9 November 1981 (24th Aippasi 1157 of Tamil Calendar). The Nakshatra on this day was Revatī. Thereafter, every year, celebrations are conducted on the month of Aippasi on the day of Revatī nakshatra. There are three main buildings in the temple: the renovated Nagaramman temple, the Amman Temple (built in 1981), and Shiva Maadan Temple (built later), which houses the deity Boothathan.

The Temple complex consists of the main campus, which houses the main deities, and the surrounding area. These areas also hold bases for some deities, a spring (ootrukuzhi) where fresh water flows year round, the temple pond, rocks and trees. The pond is also known as irumpudayaan kulam. Legend tells that iron was melted and poured into this pond.

The temple is currently maintained by the Elur Chetty community.

== History ==
Although the exact origins of the temple are not known, it is believed the temple was worshipped for more than 8000 years. The Nagaramman (The Snake Goddess) temple and the centre lamp post are the only structures remaining from the original temple. There are broken remains of baked mud statues around the temple. These remains tell us that the temple was worshipped by many devotees during those days.

During the early days of the complex, the entire area was covered with wild bushes and trees. Devotees had to make way through the bushes to reach the temple. The Nagaramman temple itself was fully covered with bushes. Later, the complex was cleared of these bushes.

== Location ==
The Temple is situated in the area of Perumchilampu, in Velimalai village, Kalkulam taluka in Kanyakumari district of South Tamil Nadu. It is situated near Padmanabhapuram town and Nagercoil city, the administrative headquarters of the area.
