= Vallanattu Chettiar =

Vallanattu Chettiar (Nagarathar) are a community who have been classified in the state of Tamil Nadu as an Other Backward Class under India's system of positive discrimination. They are also called as Vallanattu Nagarathar Chettiar.

== See also ==
- Nagarathar
- Aruviyur Nagarathar
- Nattukottai Nagarathar
- Thiruvathira
