= Karpaka Vinayakar Temple =

Temple in Tamil Nadu, India

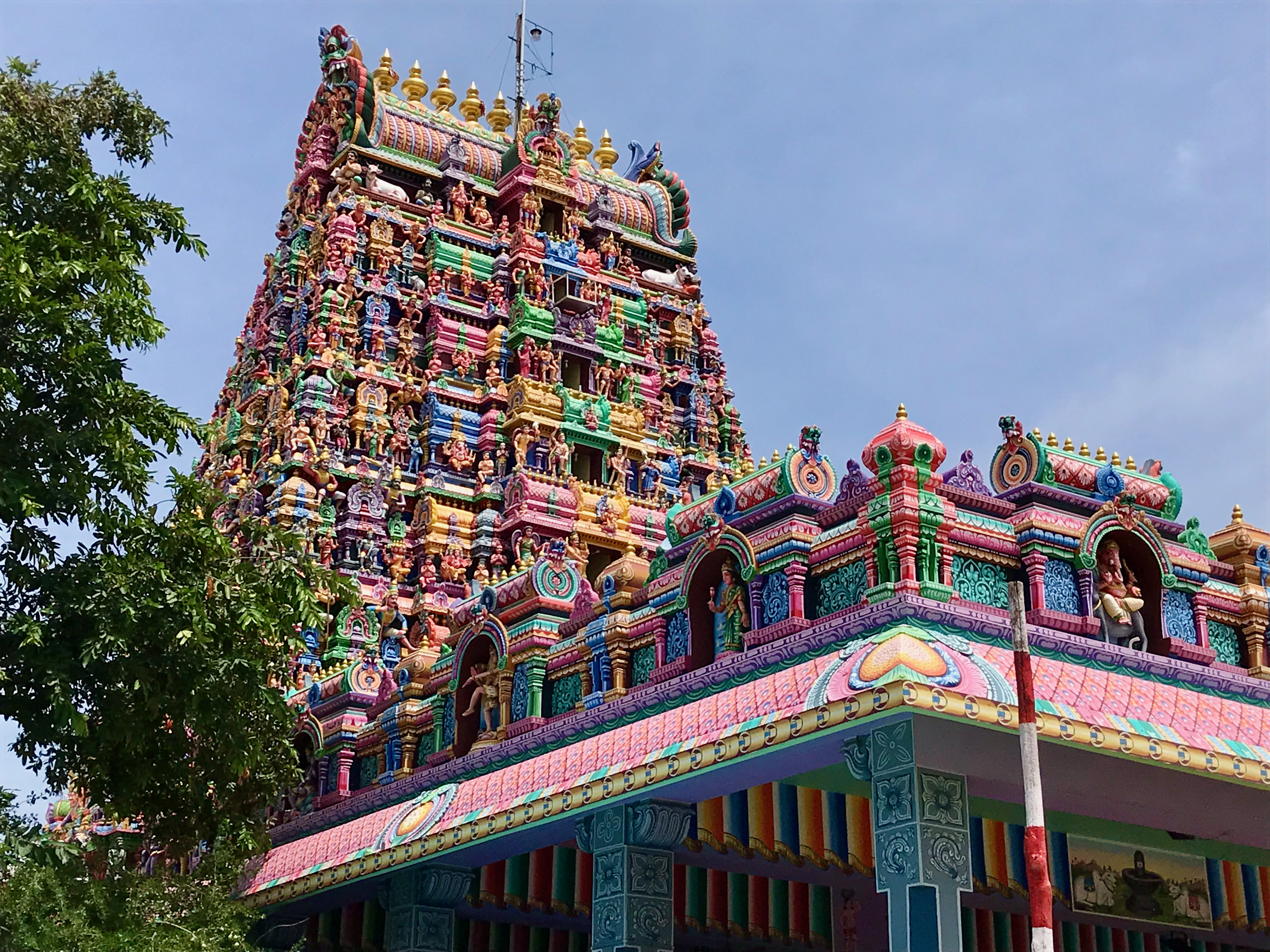
- The East facing Gopura Vimanam of Karpaka Vinayakar Temple

- Location within Tamil Nadu Location within India

Religion
- Affiliation: Hinduism
- District: Sivagangai District
- Deity: Karpaka Vinayaka

Location
- Location: Tiruppattur
- State: Tamil Nadu
- Country: India
- Coordinates: 10°07′09″N 78°40′04″E

Architecture
- Type: Dravidian
- Completed: 8th century CE

Website
- www.pillaiyarpattitemple.com

Karpaka Vinayaka Temple or Pillaiyarpatti Pillaiyar Temple is a 7th-century-CE rock-cut cave shrine, significantly expanded over the later centuries. It is located in Pillayarpatti village in Tiruppathur Taluk, Sivaganga district in Tamil Nadu, India.

The temple is dedicated to Karpaka Vinayakar (Ganesha). In the cave temple, there are rock cut images of Ganesha, Siva linga and another carving that has been variously identified as Ardhanarishwara or Harihara or the early king between them who built this temple. All these are notable for their unusual iconography. In the late 19th century, during restorative excavation and repair work, panchaloga statues were discovered. These are dated to the 11th century.

The temple has several inscriptions within the rock-cut shrines, as well as on the walls and mandapam outside. One of them mentions "Desi vinayakar" and also helps date the core layer of this temple to the 7th-century Ganesha. Another notable inscription in the sanctum is more archaic, sharing paleographic features of Tamil Brahmi and early Vatteluttu. This has led to proposals that portions of this Ganesha temple are likely older by a few centuries. The temple walls and mandapams have additional stone inscriptions from the 11th to 13th-century.

The temple is one of the nine ancestral Hindu temples of the Nagarathars, its importance established in their tradition in Kali year 3815 (714 CE). The temple has a large colorful gopuram, with large mandapams elaborately decorated with frescoes, many shrines inside, salas originally added for dance and hymns singing, temple kitchen, an architecture that follows the Agamic texts and Shilpa Sastras, and a large temple tank to its north. Most of these were added in later centuries to the core rock-cut cave shrine. The temple is active and attracts numerous pilgrims, particularly women, on the annual festivals and chariot processions such as on Vinayaka Chaturthi and the Brahmothsavam in the Tamil month of Vaikasi.

== Location ==
The Karpaka Vinayakar temple is located on the eastern edge of a rocky hill in Pillayarpatti village (also spelled Pillaiyarpatti). The temple is about 12 km northwest of Karaikudi city, 75 kilometres (47 mi) northeast of Madurai city and 15 kilometres (9.3 mi) northwest of Karaikudi town in Tamil Nadu. Pilliyarpatti is located about 12 kilometers east of Tiruppathur town. Pillayarpatti is accessible by National Highway 36 and State Highway 35. The image of Karpaga Vinayagar is carved out in a cave of Pillaiyarpatti Hillocks in this village. Thiruveesar (Shiva) is also carved in the rock of this cave, along with several other bas-reliefs all from 7th-century.

== History and architecture ==
The early Pandya dynasty ruled the southern part of the ancient Tamil region from about the 3rd-century BCE and they remained a major power for nearly 1,000 years. They lost their hold on their kingdom to the Cholas for a few centuries, and then returned to power about the 12th century. They were instrumental in patronizing literature, arts and religious architecture, as well as sharing of ideas and trade with northern kingdoms of ancient India. The Karpaka Vinayakar temple is a testimony and one of the evidence of the early Pandya dynasty contributions to the South Indian heritage.

The temple in its contemporary form has many layers of additions and restorations completed over nearly 1,400 years. The earliest layer that can be dated with certainty is the 7th-century rock-cut cave temple. This rock-cut cave is attributed to Narasimhavarma, c. 650 CE. Several rock-cut Hindu gods and goddesses are displayed in this earliest layer. The cave also includes inscriptions and unusual iconography. There are several stone sculptures in the cave, on different faces of the natural rock:

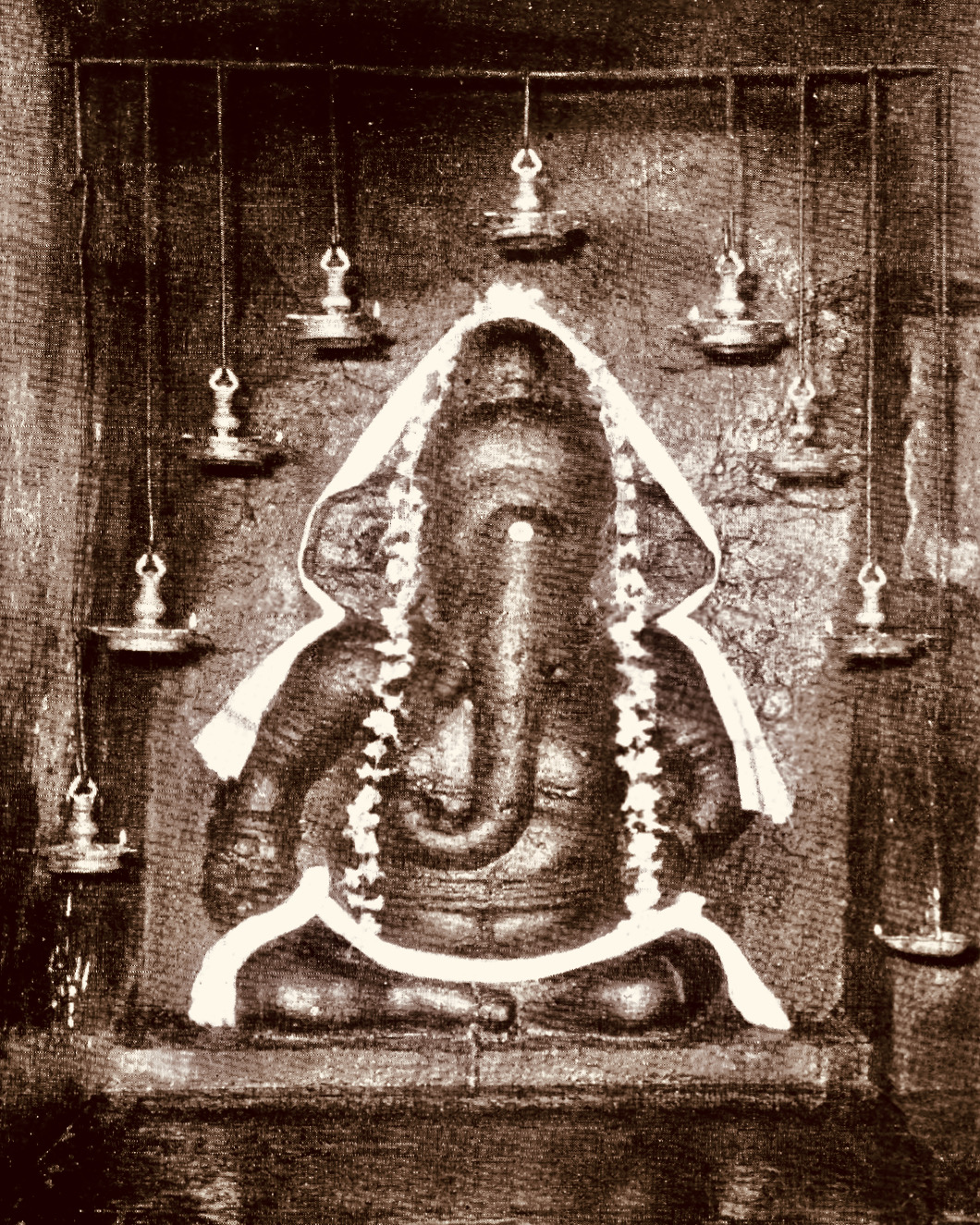
The main idol, the 7th-century rock-cut Ganesha, without the gold plating.

- The primary sanctum is dedicated to Ganesha, referred to as the Vinayagar sannidhi (sanctum sanctorum). On the southern face of the rock is a 6-foot rock-cut bas-relief of Karpaga Vinayagar. This Ganesha faces the north direction. As this is a cave excavated in a large natural rocky hillock, there is no provision for the pradakshina, that is circumambulatory passage. The iconography of Ganesha is unusual in several ways. First, he has only two hands. Second, he holds sweets in his right hand and his trunk is curved at the right side, unlike later statues which typically show him with four hands, with trunk turned left, and holding sweets in one of his left hands. At the Karpaka Vinayakar relief of Ganesha, his left tusk is broken suggesting that some of the iconographic features of Ganesha were well established by the time this image was carved. Locals call this relief as Valampuri Vinayagar. There is a 7th-century inscription near him that refers to the relief as "Desi vinayagar".
- A Shiva sanctum on the west face of cave wall, inside a gajaprashta (elephant-back form of excavation), with the sanctum opening to the east. It has a 7th-century Shiva linga at its center. A notable inscription in this sanctum states "Ikkatturu Kotturu Ainiijan", likely the name(s) of the patron(s) responsible for its excavation. The notability is in the paleographic nature of the inscription. The script is more archaic than the earliest Vatteluttu, with some Tamil Brahmi influence, yet it is clearly not Tamil Brahmi and is later than the 3rd-century CE Tamil Brahmi in its features. This, states the epigraphist and historian R. Nagaswamy, suggests that the inscription inside the rock-cut cave excavation and Hindu iconography here was likely created between the 3rd and 7th-century.
- Between the rock-cut Ganesha and the rock-cut Shiva shrine is another unusual bas-relief of a standing royal human form with two attendants. This has been variously interpreted as Ardhanarishwara (half Shiva, half Parvati) or Harihara (half Shiva, half Vishnu) or a king between two officials. The difficulty and complexity with these interpretations is its simplicity, lack of classic emblems (icons), and the presence of certain icons. The central standing figure has two hands, in the samabhanga posture with the left hand on the hip in katyavalambita posture, all defined in early silpa sastra texts of Hinduism. The right hand is in the boon giving varada gesture per ancient Sanskrit texts. The head of this 7th-century bas-relief is decorated with long elongated jatamakuta (jeweled oblong crown). The left half of the central figure is clearly different than the right half, though fused. One interpretation is that this may be a Pallava king where this sort of headdress is seen. However, this hypothesis fails because the Pallava dynasty was non-existent at this time in southern Tamil Nadu and was not the sponsor of this cave excavation. Further, there is no reason or example where a king was depicted in Tamil Nadu with two different halves or in boon boon-giving posture. The second hypothesis is that this is an early bas-relief of Ardhanarishwara. This hypothesis is favored by the fact that the left side is more conspicuously feminine and with jewelry (more pronounced breast, dress). A third hypothesis states that this is a different form of Harihara. Nagaswamy favors the Harihara hypothesis primarily because of the crown and how it is carved in the typical kirita-form of crown for the Vishnu side. The right side of the crown is consistent with Shiva's crown, while the left side with Vishnu, states Nagaswamy. In the South Indian tradition, Parvati is emblematically identified as Vishnu's sister and with some of Vishnu's emblems. The two attendants may be Candesha and Garuda, according to Nagaswamy. Given the lack of emblems in this bas-relief of those typically associated with Shiva, Vishnu and Parvati, this bas-relief can be either Ardhanarishwara or Harihara, albeit unusual in either case.

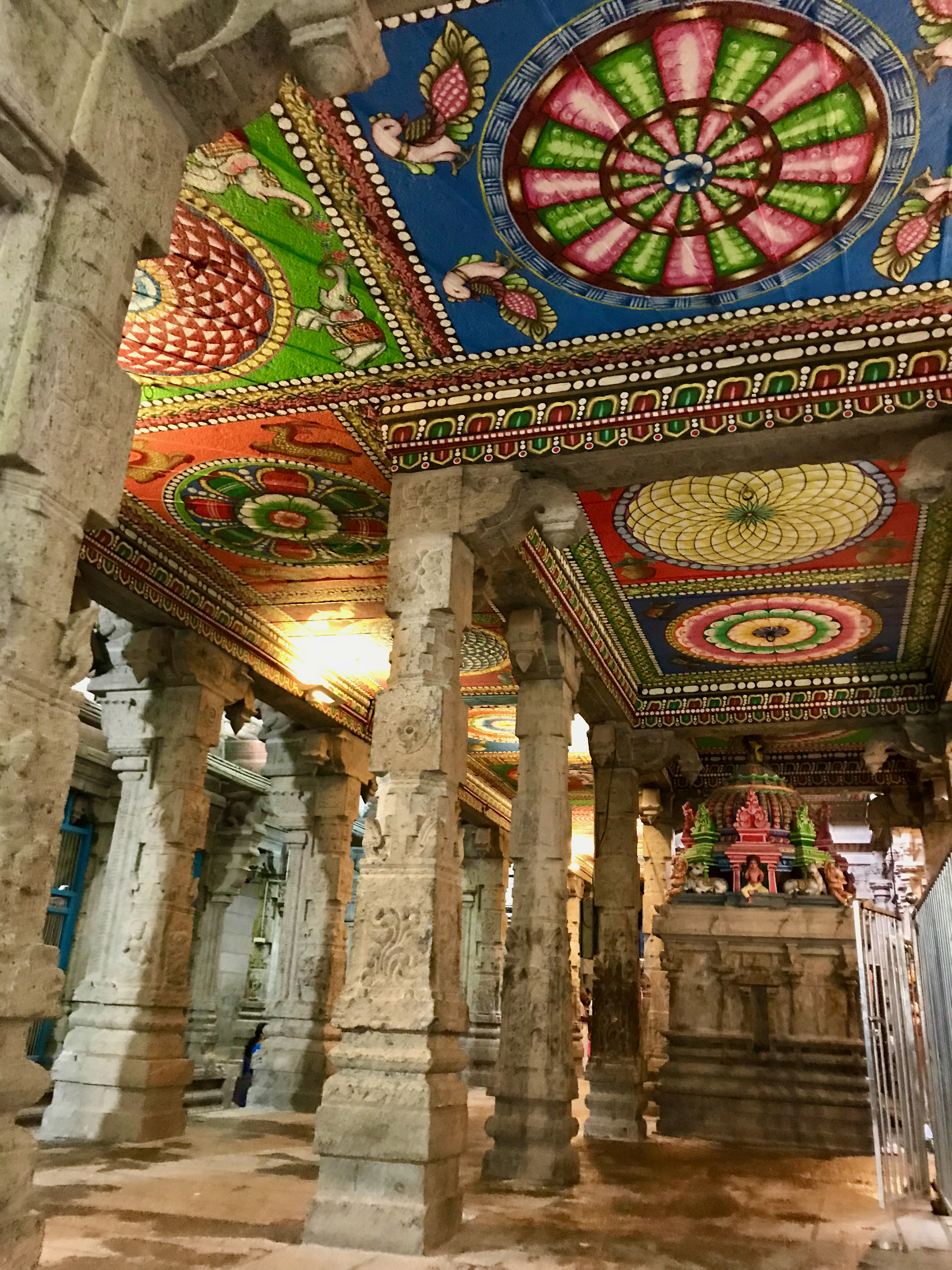
The Mandapam has extensive frescoes, in distance above is one of the shrines.

- Another Harihara-like relief is found on the side wall of the excavated cave. Once again, it is two-armed instead of the typical, later era four-armed Harihara. This is a partial bas-relief, carved up to the waist placed above a square shaped pillar outline. Nagaswamy identifies this as Lingodbhava. Once again this is unusual, as Lingodbhava is typically shown with Brahma and Vishnu on each side, or with Brahma implied with hamsa (swan) and Vishnu implied with varaha (boar).

Later expansions added several mandapams (Maha, Thirumurai, Alankara), another Shiva shrine, a Nataraja shrine, a Chandesar shrine, and a Sivakami Amman shrine. On the southern side of mandapam, parallel and near to the excavated cave is a panel with the Saptamatrikas (also called Saptha Kannimar, seven mothers or seven virgins), The temple also includes shrines or dedicated area for Bhairava (Shiva form) with his dog, Somaskanda, Kartikeya with his two wives, Valli (who arrange marriages), Devasena, also called Deivayanai, (who gifts offspring), Pasupatheeswarar (who showers all wealth), Navagrahas, and two gopurams (east and north sides). For charitable functions, like large Shaiva tradition temples, the Karpaka Vinayakar has a large temple kitchen called madapalli, and a temple well inside the mandapam to provide water for pilgrims. The temple also has space for devotional singing of hymns and performance arts.

== Religious importance and festivals ==
The temple is one of the nine ancestral Hindu temples of the Chettiars, a merchant and trading community. It is maintained by the Chettiars trust (Nagarathars), but their tradition states that they have maintained and worshipped in this Shaivism tradition temple since Kali year 3813 (same as 714 CE). (Note: The other eight are Ilayathankudi temple (Kailasanathar-Nityakalyani Amman), Mathur temple (Innutreeswarar-Periyanayaki Amman), Vairavanpatti temple (Valarolinathar-Vadivudai Amman), Iraniyur temple (Alkondanathar-Shivapuranadevi Amman), Nemam temple (Jayamkondacholeswarar-Soundaryanayaki Amman), Iluppakkudi temple (Thanthondreesar-Soundaryanayaki Amman), Suraikkuai temple (Desikanathar-Avudaiamman) and Velankudi temple (Kandeeswarar-Kamakshi Amman). All of these were adopted by the Chettiars between 712 and 718 CE, with the blessings of the Pandya ruler.) Chettiars have organized their conservation and temples initiatives through sub-communities based on Shiva Temples such as the Pillayarpatti Pirivu, Elayatrankudi Pirivu. This is considered as a Shiva tradition temple, given its historic importance with Shiva linga and the Karpaga Vinayaka.

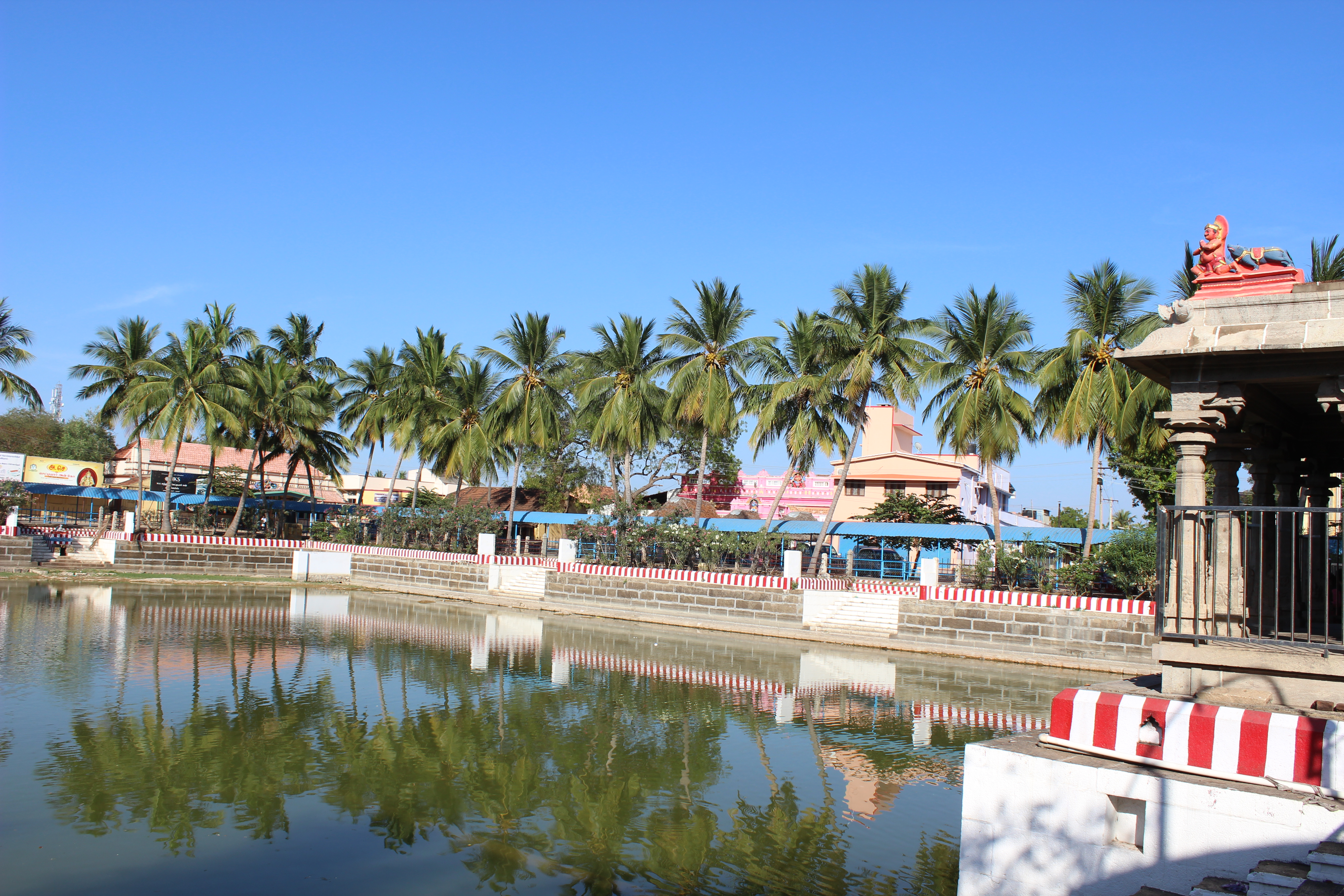
Temple Pond

The temple is a major center for the annual Vinayaka Chaturthi festival. It is celebrated for 10 days. On the 9th day the chariot festival is held, where Hindus of the region gather and participate in a procession that goes through the streets. The processional Ganesha idol is covered with gold plating and carried in a mouse vahana, along with his parents, Nataraja and Sivakami. Additionally, the temple features floor decorations, exhibitions, performance arts and sandal covering (Chandana Kaappu) over these days. This tradition became more significant since festival idols made of panchaloga were found in late 19th-century during the temple repairs and renovation. These are likely from the 11th century. The Vinayaka Chaturthi (Ganesha Chaturthi) festival is popular among Tamil women.

== Administration ==
The temple is maintained and administered by Nattukottai Nagarathars.

The temple opens at 6 in the morning and stays open till 1 PM. The shrine is again opened at 4PM and is open till 8.30 PM. It is an active temple, with daily worship services. On 1 May 2017, Kumbhabhishekham was performed at this temple.

== Gallery ==
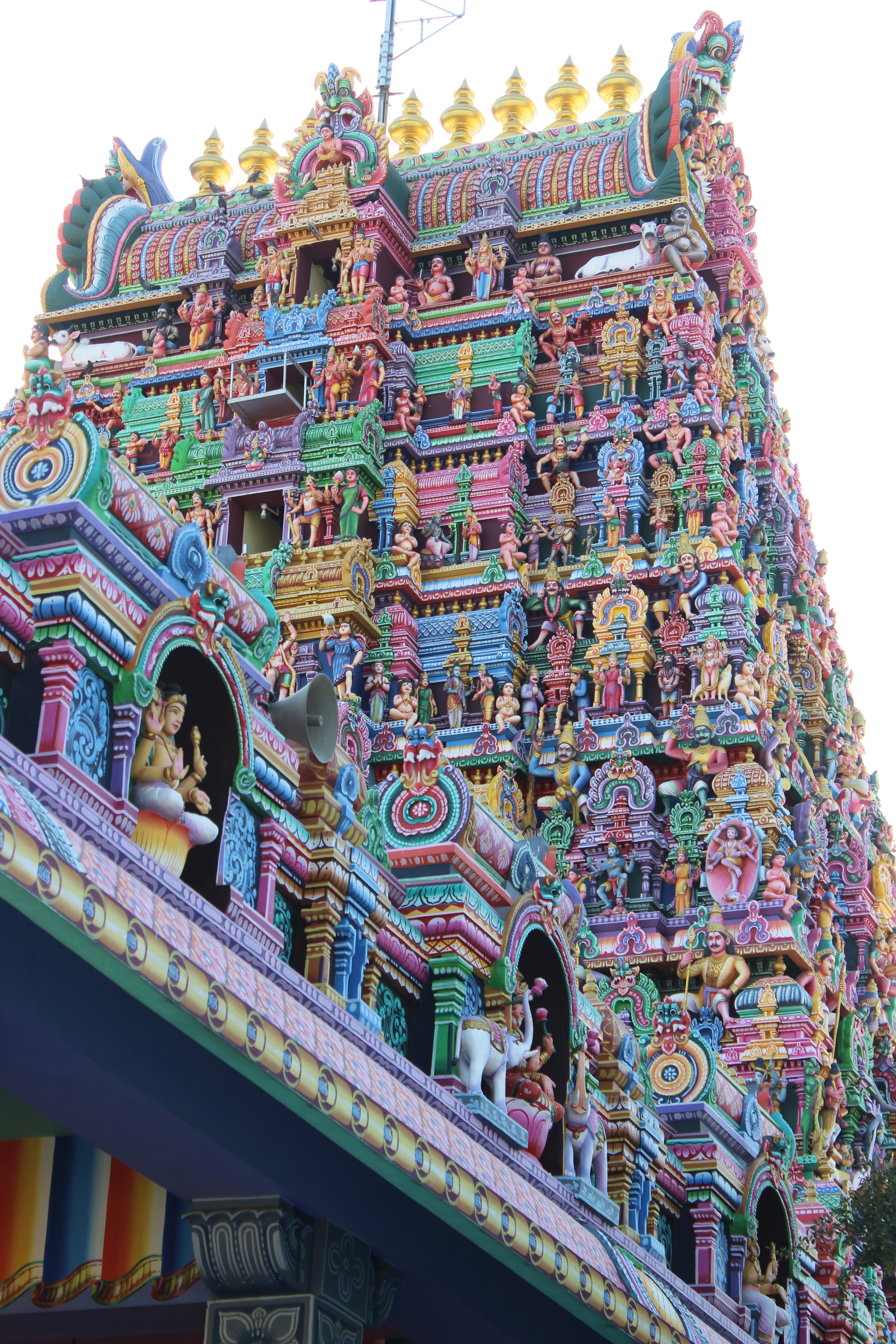
Temple Gopuram (entrance tower)

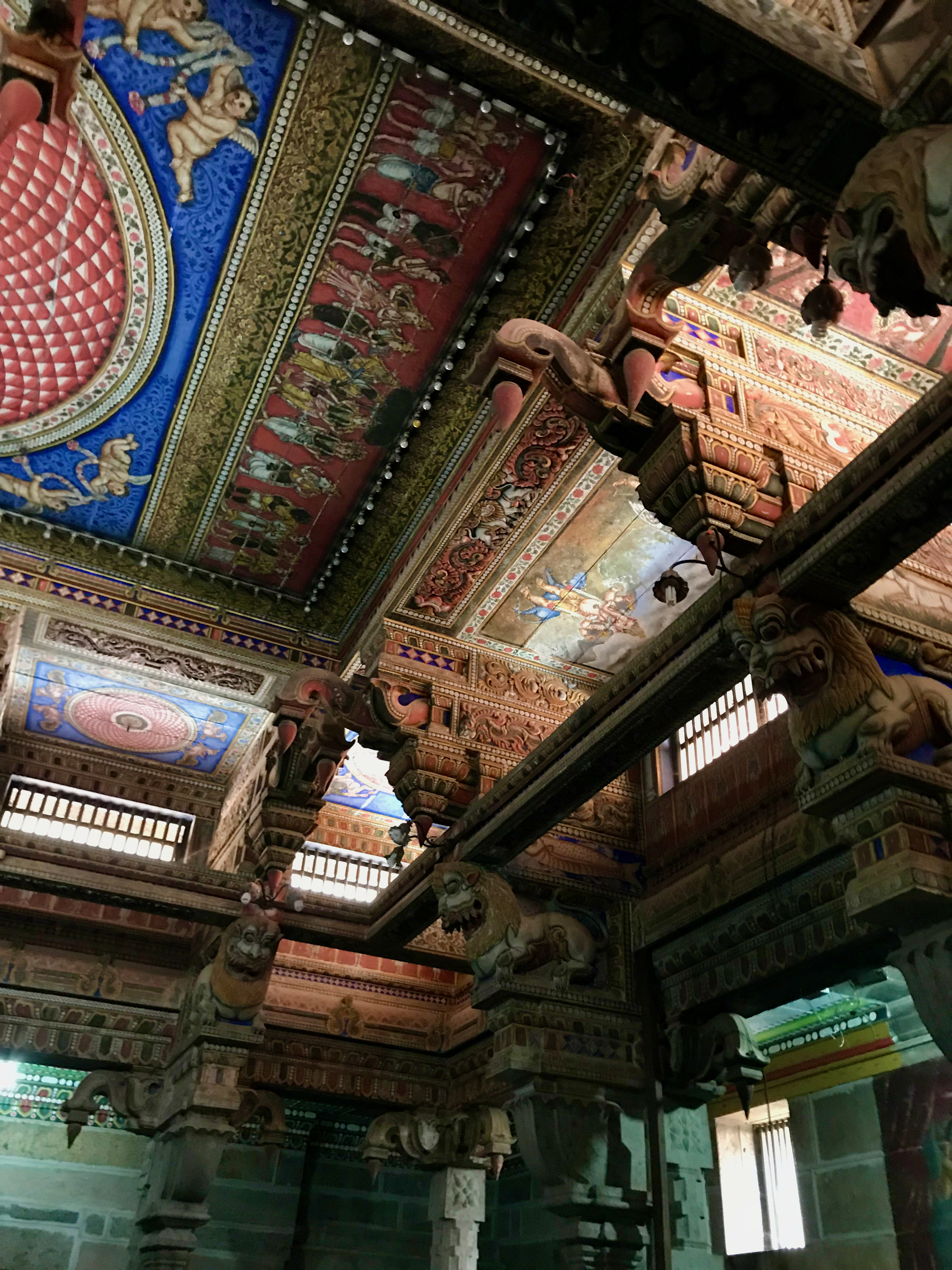
Carved pillars, ceiling and frescoes

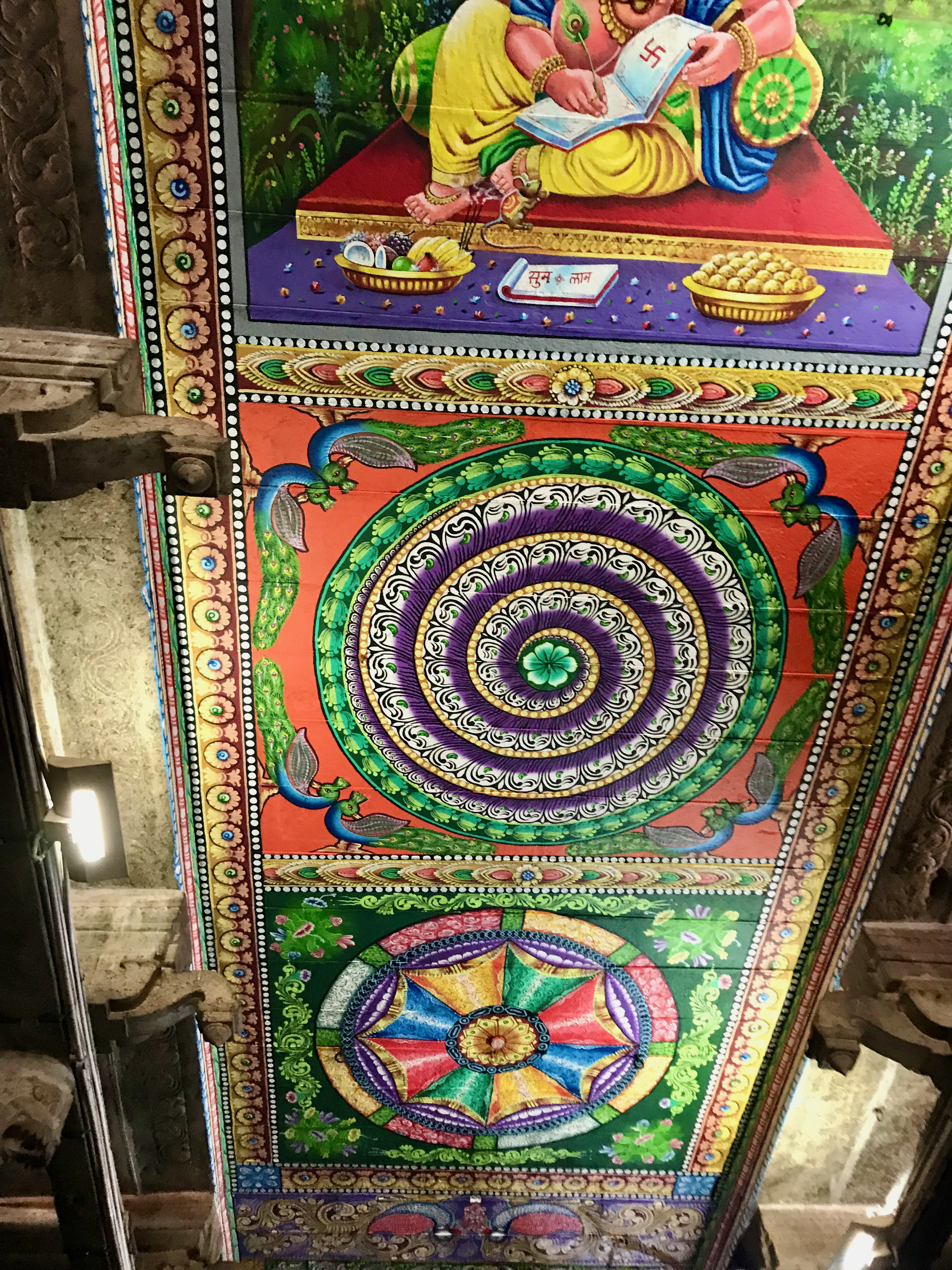
Ceiling frescoes

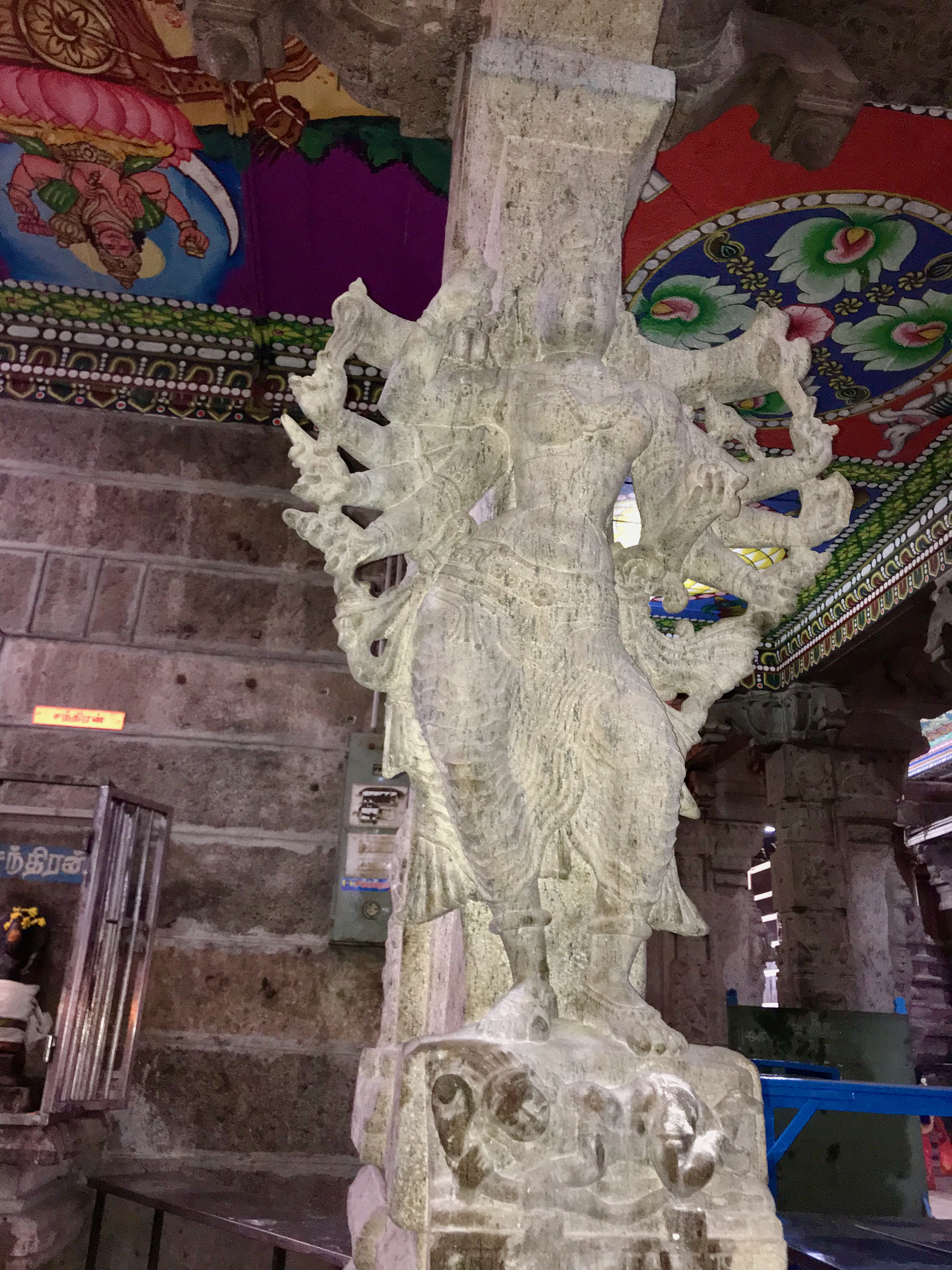
Statue of Durga in the mandapam.

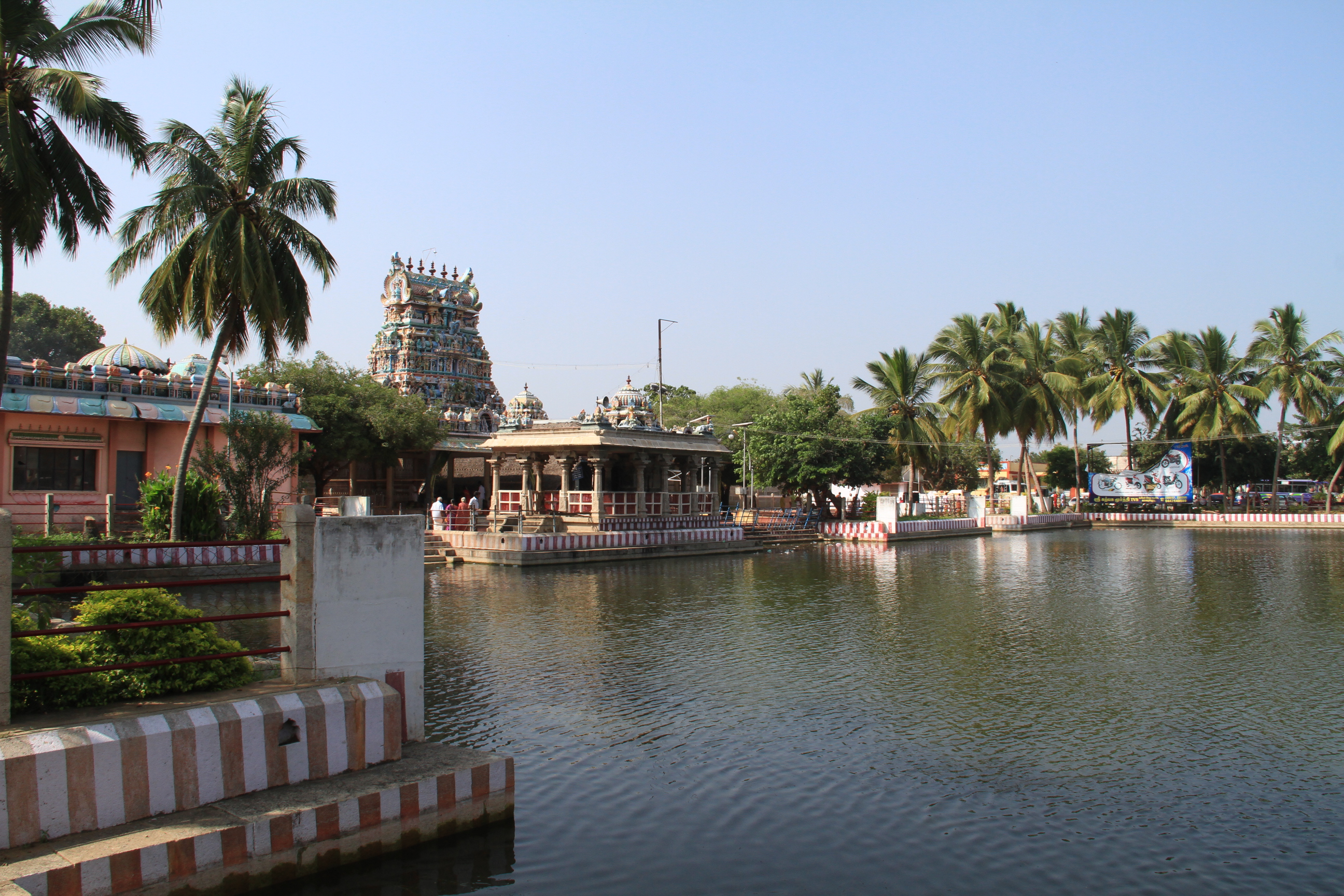
The temple and its pond
