= Ganapathipuram =

- Town
- Location in Tamil Nadu, India
- Coordinates: 8°11′32″N 77°24′48″E
- Country: India
- State: Tamil Nadu
- District: Kanniyakumari

Population (2001)
  - Total: 13,653

Languages
  - Official: Tamil
- Time zone: UTC+5:30 (IST)

Ganapathipuram is a panchayat town in Kanniyakumari district in the state of Tamil Nadu, India.

== Demographics ==
As of 2001 India census, Ganapathipuram had a population of 13,653. Males constitute 50% of the population and females 50%. Ganapathipuram has an average literacy rate of 74%, higher than the national average of 59.5%: male literacy is 77%, and female literacy is 72%. In Ganapathipuram, 11% of the population is under 6 years of age.

There is also another village named "Ganapathipuram" in North Arcot District, near Arakkonam. This village can also be reached from Kanchipuram and is about 18 km away. There are two prominent temples in this village: Sri Kothanda Ramar and Amman.
