= Sivaganga Palace =

Palace in Sivaganga district, Tamil Nadu, India

Coordinates: 9°50′55″N 78°29′11″E

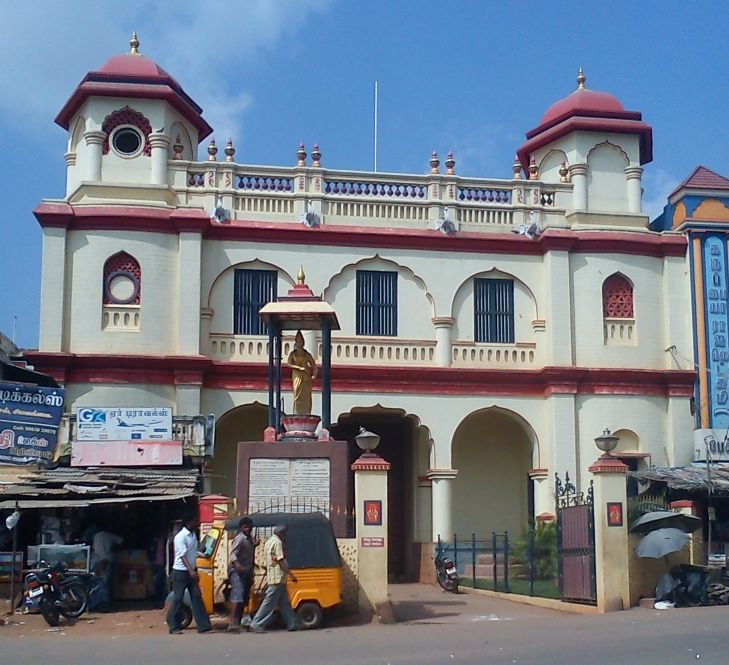
Sivaganga Palace

Sivaganga Palace is a palace in Sivaganga district, Tamil Nadu, southern India, about 40 kilometres (25 mi) from Madurai. It is an old royal palace, with many historical connections. The palace was used as residence by queens Velu Nachiyar (1780–90), Vellacci Nachiyar (1790–93) and Rani Kaathama Nachiar (1864–77). No remains of the original Sivaganga Palace exist, but a new palace, known as "Gowri Vilasam", was built by Padamathur Gowry Vallabha Thevar (1801-1829) in the year 19th century. A heritage site of Chettinad, it was the property of Rani Velu Nachiar.

== Early history ==
The original palace, built in 1730, was the venue of secret negotiations between Veerapandiya Kattabomman and the Maruthu Pandiyar brothers to attack the British East India Company. It came under attack by various combatants several times between 1762 and 1789. The only remnant of the original palace was in the form of a high wall which has since been destroyed.

== Gowri Vilasam ==
A new structure was built in the early 19th century by Padamathur Gowry Vallabha Thevar (1801-1829) and named the Gowri Vilasam. After Thevar died, his brother, Oyya, occupied the palace with his sons. He took over the leadership of the kingdom on the ruse that the British would take over, as the king had died intestate. They created false documents by forging the signature of the late king to take over the kingdom and crowned themselves sitting on the black marble stone of the court of the palace.

== Architecture and fittings ==
The now dilapidated Gowri Vilasam is built in the architectural style of the Tirumala Naikas, which has some features of the Rajaputana arts. There was a clock on the front gate of the facade on the southern side of this place, no longer in a working condition. Within the palace is the Temple of Sri Raja Rajeshwari, with the deity Raja Rajeswar of the Royal House of Sivaganga. The temple is functional and the renowned poet Papanasam Sivan is said to have composed many popular songs extolling the deity. The temple also has a statue of the king Kandumekki Woodaya Taver.

== Grounds ==
The palace grounds contain the Durbar hall of the past kings, which honour notable poets. Within the palace grounds is a black marble square, with a carved marble seat which was used to rule a court of justice; it was used during the dynastic period for the crowning ceremony of new kings. Another important feature is the "teppakulam", a large masonry tank or reservoir which fronts the palace.
