= Throwing stick =

Throwing weapon

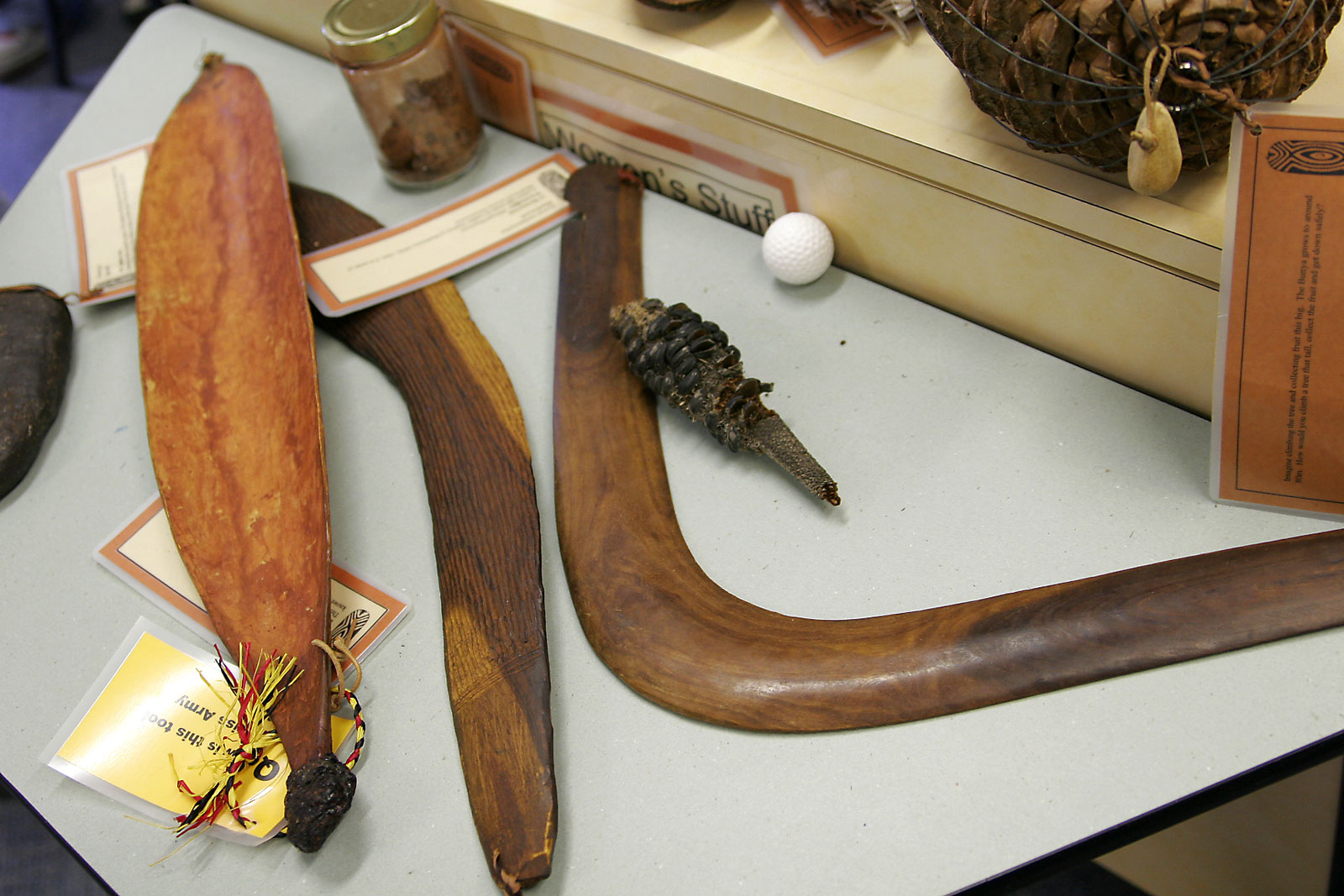
Aboriginal craft: throwing sticks

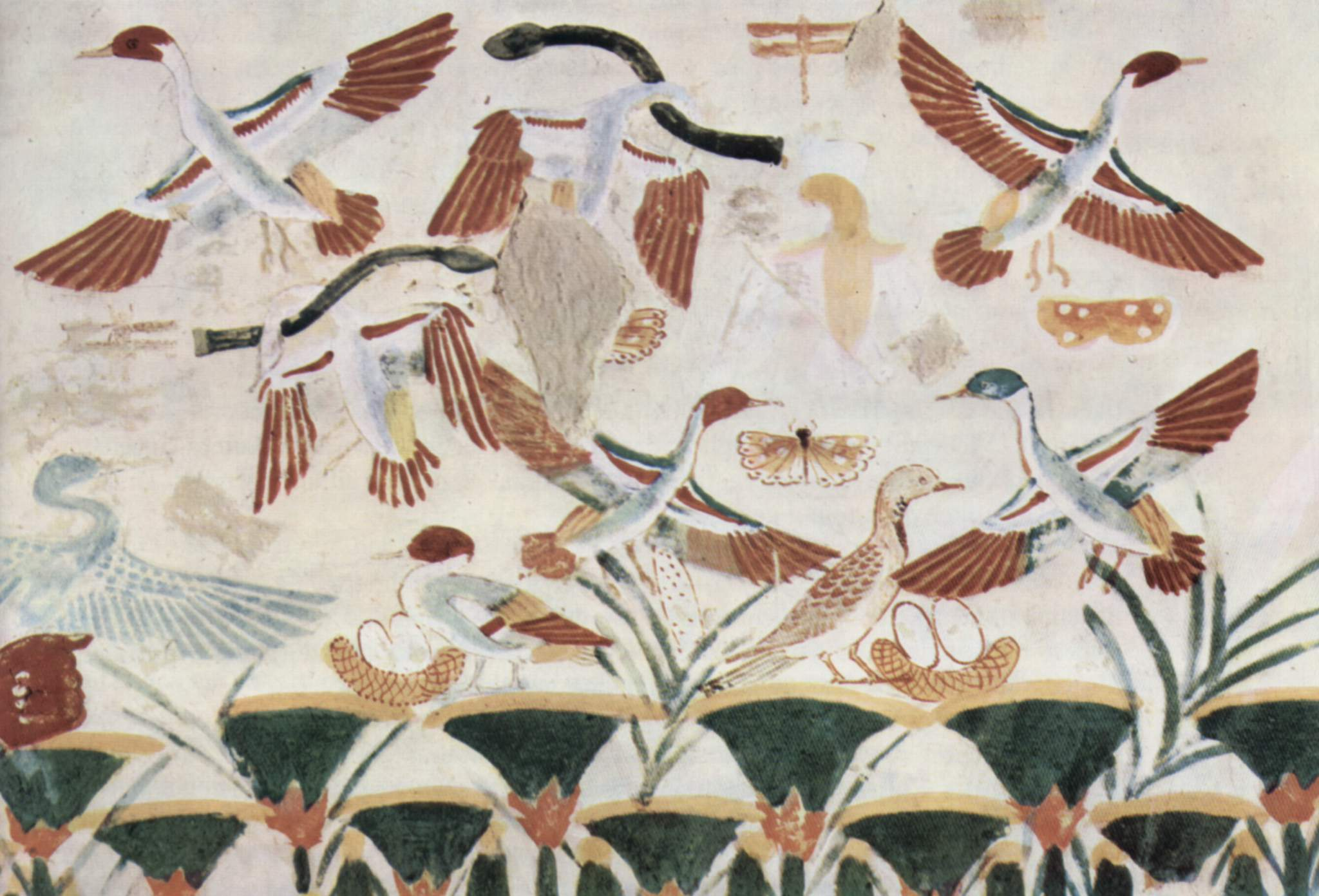
Hunting birds with throwing sticks in ancient Egypt

The throwing stick, throwing club, or rabbit stick is a type of projectile weapon: a wooden rod with either a carved pointed tip, a heavy bulbous rounded head, or a spearhead or other metal fitting attached to one end, intended for use by throwing and especially for hunting smaller animals.

Throwing sticks or clubs are likely among the earliest weapons and tools made and used by humans, first appearing in prehistory due to their simplicity and ease of production from common materials—chiefly various types of wood. Numerous forms and styles of throwing sticks have been developed across many cultures over millennia, showcasing a wide range of shapes and appearances depending on their place and culture of origin.

Generally speaking, throwing sticks are either straight, curved, or roughly boomerang-shaped, and are typically much shorter than javelins. The throwing stick became obsolete as slings and bows became more prevalent hunting weapons, except on the Australian continent, where the native people continued refining the basic design.

Throwing sticks shaped like returning boomerangs are designed to fly straight to a target at long ranges, their surfaces acting as airfoils. When tuned correctly they do not exhibit curved flight, but rather fly on an extended straight flight path. Straight flight ranges greater than 100 m (330 ft) have been reported for certain throwing sticks by historical sources as well as in recent research.

== Distribution ==
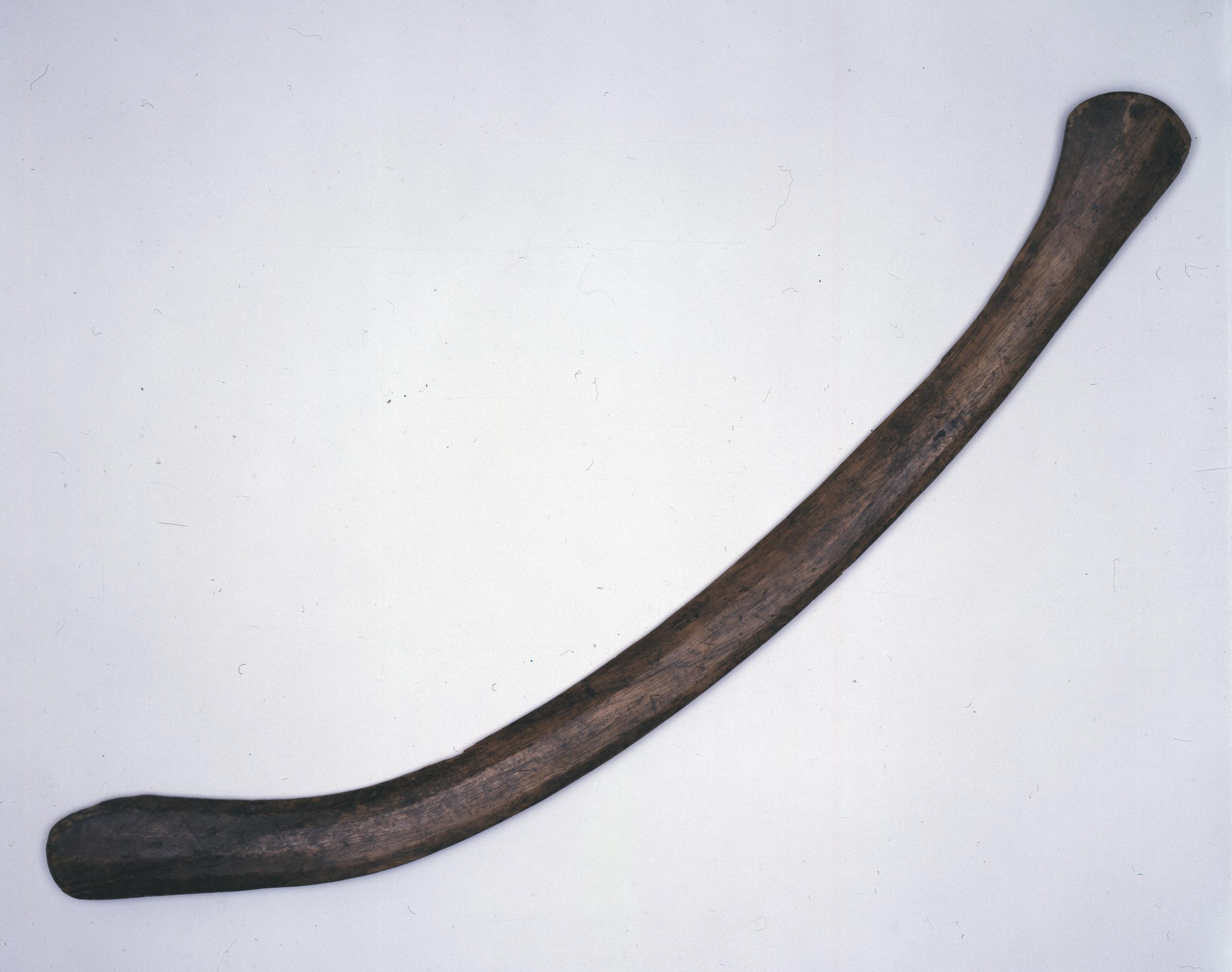
Ancient Egyptian throwing stick at the British Museum

The ancient Egyptians used throwing sticks to hunt small game and waterfowl, as seen in several wall paintings. The 18th-dynasty pharaoh Tutankhamun was a known lover of duck hunting and used the throwing stick in his hunts, and a number of throwing sticks were found in the tombs of pharaohs.

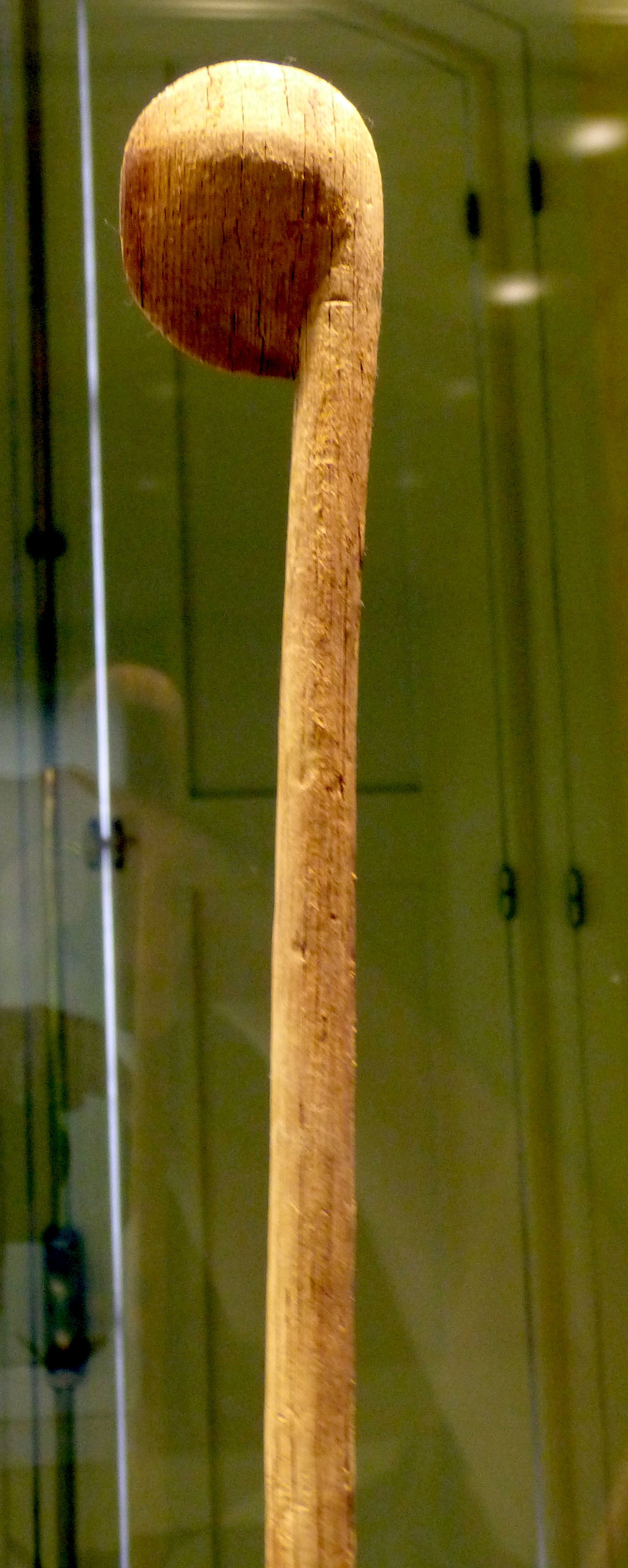
Throwing baton of a Guanche mencey (king)

Menceys, the kings of the ancient Guanches of the Canary Islands, also used throwing batons. Gimel, the third letter of many Semitic alphabets, may have been named after a weapon that was either a staff sling or a throwing stick, ultimately deriving from a Proto-Sinaitic glyph based on an Egyptian hieroglyph.

The Greeks used the lagobolon or kalaurops, which was a versatile hunting weapon.

The Aboriginal peoples of Australia are well-known for their use of the boomerang. Although returning boomerangs are found in many Aboriginal cultures and will return to the user if thrown properly, the choice weapon of the Indigenous Australian peoples and most cultures was the heavy throwing stick, known internationally as the kylie. It was primarily used to kill kangaroos, wallabies, and emus from afar, though it could also be swung like a club.

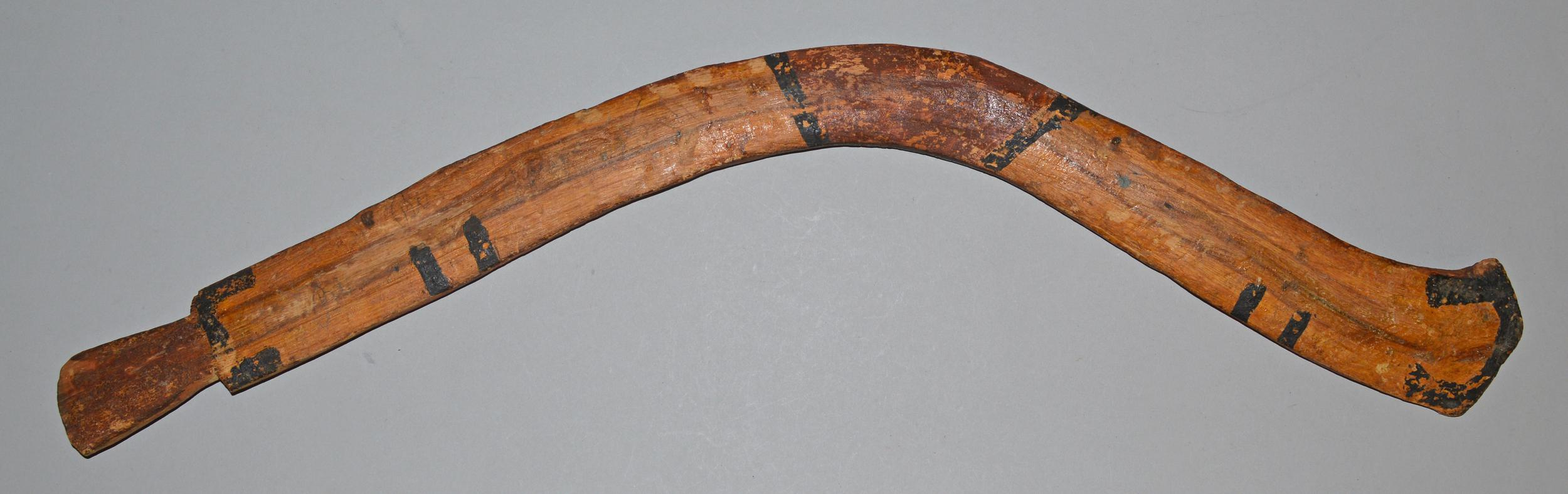
Hopi rabbit stick at the British Museum

Some Native American tribes such as the Hopi, as well as all southern California tribes, utilized the throwing stick to hunt rabbits and occasionally deer.

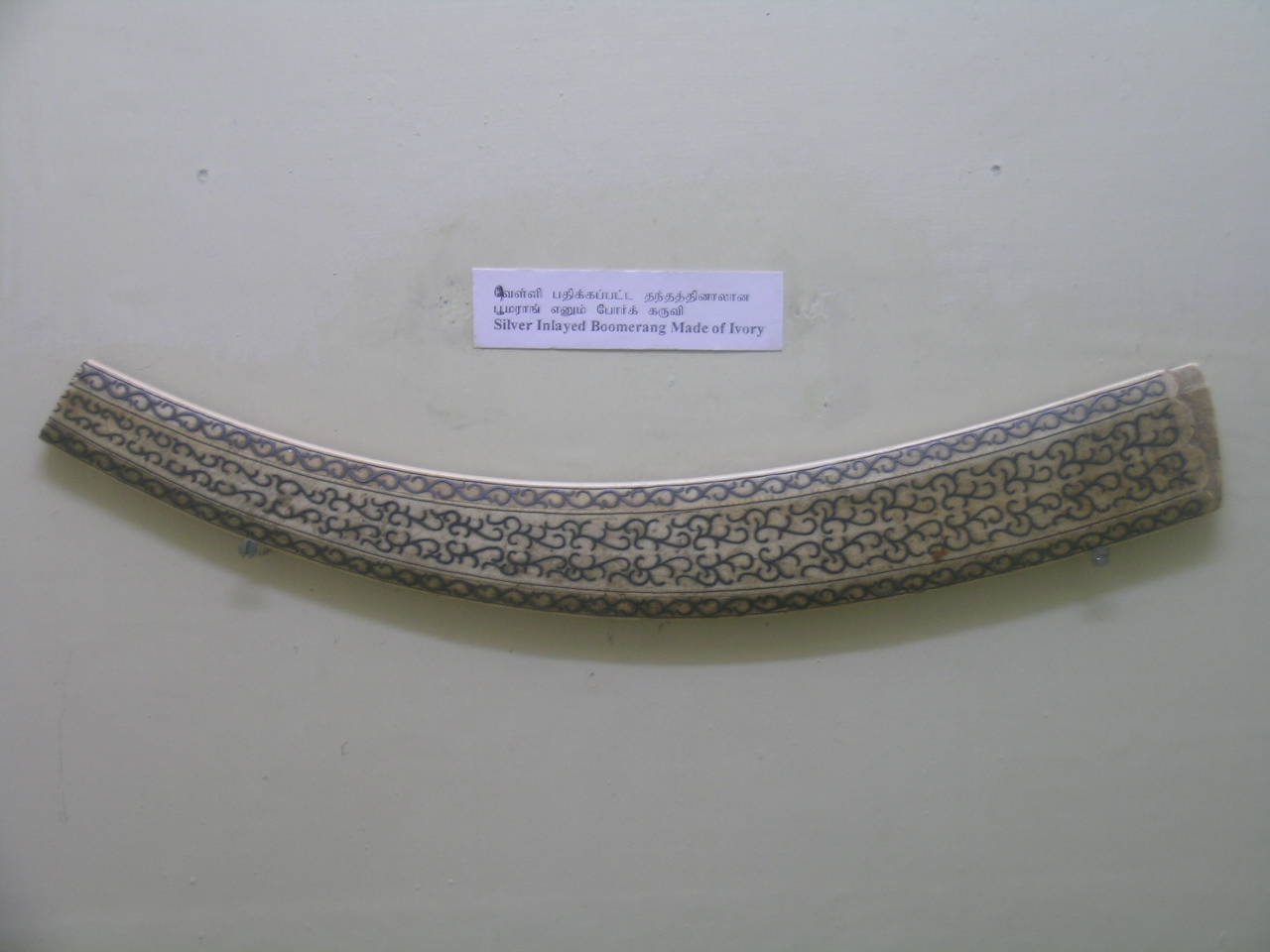
A valari made of ivory and inlayed with silver

The Tamil people of the Indian subcontinent use valaris made from either wood, ivory, or metal as both a melee and throwing weapon.

The throwing stick was also one of the first weapons used by European stone age people to hunt. Stone carvings in Brittany, France have been found depicting throwing sticks.

Though originally designed for hunting and survival, the throwing stick can be used as a weapon in human conflicts, though the heavy non-returning boomerang was the only variant ever to become truly effective against a human opponent.

== Survival tool ==
As a survival tool, the throwing stick is one of the most effective and easiest tools to obtain. It can be used as a digging tool for making fire-pits and underground shelters in addition to its function as a weapon. A curved branch will suffice as a basic throwing stick. Ancient throwing sticks were made of hardwood with a weighted or curved end to one side to impart momentum so the stick stays straight and does not wobble in mid-flight.

== Variations ==
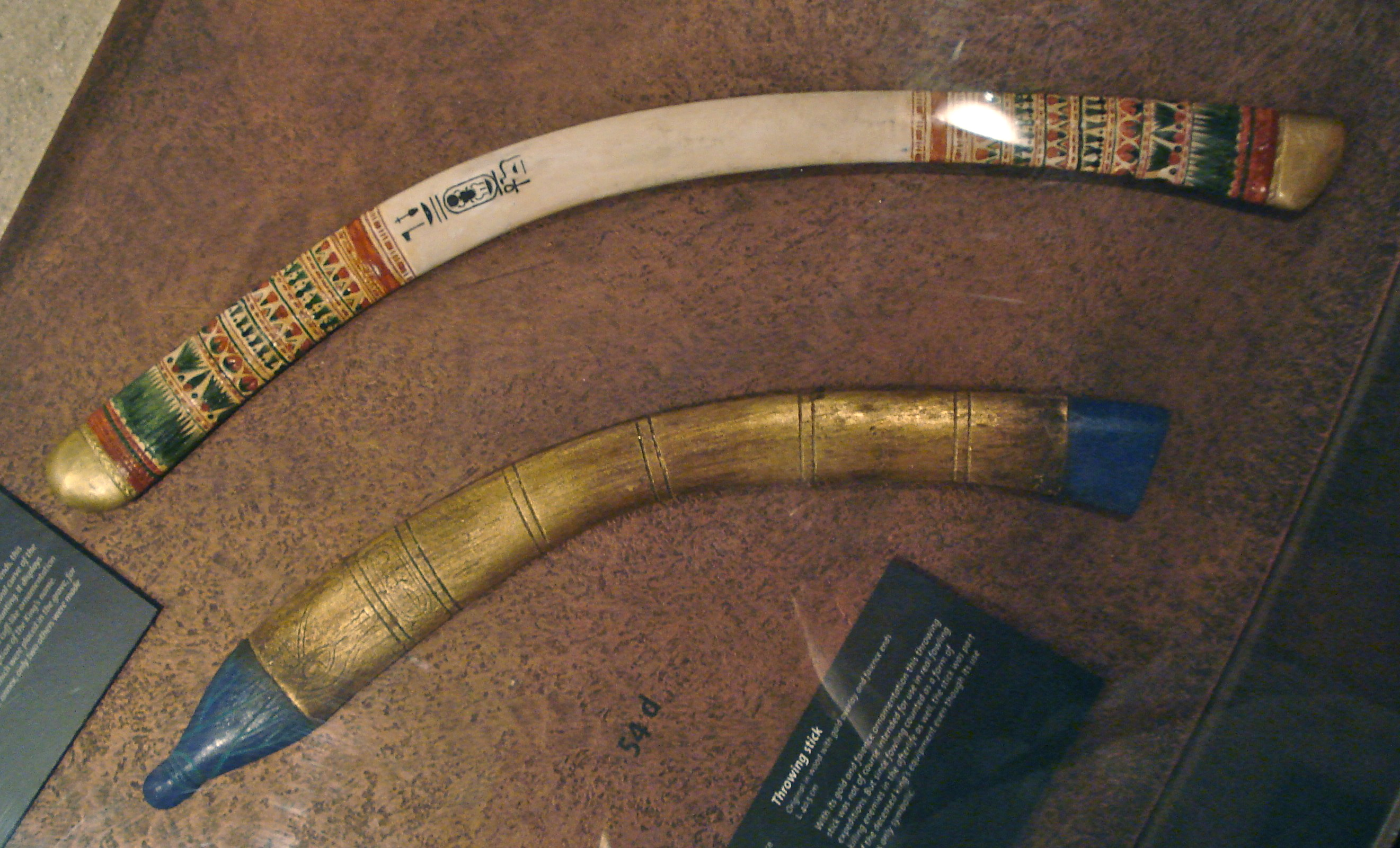
Throwing sticks found in the tomb of Tutankhamun. The one on top is made of ivory while the one on the bottom is made of gold and would have been used in ceremonial practices.

Some variations of the throwing stick are 2 to 3 ft (61 to 91 cm) long pieces of thick hardwood, usually about the circumference of the user's wrist. They are intended to be thrown with spin, creating the image of a blurry disc.

Pommel point throwing sticks are noted for their slightly blunt points that can crush skulls if thrown at sufficient speed. Thus, they are also dubbed the "skull crusher" throwing stick.

Return boomerangs have a flat convex surface and must be thrown about 10-15 degrees from upright with a sharp flick of the wrist, but throwing sticks are thrown horizontally.

== See also ==
- Spear-thrower – also called a throwing stick
- Woomera (spear-thrower) – Aboriginal variant of the spear-thrower
- Schöningen spears - Stone Age weapons
