= Kuyili =

Woman Commando of Velu Nachiyar

Veeramangai Kuyili
- Born: 29 November 1749, Kudanchavadi, Sivaganga district, Tamil Nadu
- Died: 7 October 1780, Sivagangai

Veeramangai Kuyili (29 November 1749 — 7 October 1780) was an army commander of queen Velu Nachiyar who participated in campaigns against the East India Company in the 18th century. She is considered the first suicide bomber and "first woman martyr" in Indian history.

== Biography ==
Kuyili was born in the 18th century at Kudanchavadi, near Sivagangai district. Her father was a Mochi. Her mother was also known for her bravery and is said to have died while fighting with a wild bull to save her fields from being destroyed. Kuyili was a sevaki (loyal aide) of Velu Nachiyar and repeatedly saved her life. On one such occasion, when she discovered that her Silambam teacher was actually a spy, she took action to save the queen immediately. On another occasion, when the queen was attacked during her sleep, she attacked the enemy and injured herself in the process. Seeing her loyalty and bravery, Kuyili later played an important role in the Sivaganga expedition of the queen.

Kuyili is known for her suicide attack in 1780. While attacking a fort of East India Company, she applied ghee on her body, set herself ablaze and jumped into the armoury of the East India Company, securing victory for Velu Nachiyar. Kuyili is revered as Theepaanchi Amman, meaning "the goddess who jumped into fire," in Muthupatti village near Sivagangai, Tamil Nadu, based on local oral traditions. Historical evidence about her life is scarce, relying primarily on folk songs and oral histories due to her marginalized Arunthathiyar background. A memorial and statue for Kuyili were inaugurated in the Sivagangai district by the Tamil Nadu government in July 2014 and October 2024, respectively.

== See also ==
- Rani Velu Nachiar
- Arunthathiyar
- Chamar
- Ravidassia
