= Sivaganga Kingdom =

Kingdom in British India

Kingdom of Sivagangai Chinna maravar nadu
- 1730–1948
- Status: Independent kingdom till 1801. After the exile of Peria Venga Udayana Tevar and after the death of Marudhu brothers, ministers], sivaganga was permanently settled under the deed of Istimrar in 1803 to Padamathur Gowri Vallaba Udayana Tevar to British under the proclamation of 1801. He was not only appointed as a Zamindar but the ruler of the state of Sivaganga, which was reduced to a Zamindari by the crown in the year 1863.
- Capital: Sivaganga
- Common languages: Tamil
- Religion: Hindu, Jain
- Government: Monarchy until 1801, state 1801 - 1863 and 1863 to 1948 Zamindari aa a joint family esate. 1801 to 1877 to the family of Raja Gauri Vallaba Tevar from 1877 to 1948 to the joint family of Raja Dorasinga Tevar
- zamindar
- History
  - Established: 1730
  - Disestablished: 1948

The Sivaganga Kingdom as per British records also known as Kingdom of the Lesser Marava, was a Kingdom initially, later it was permanently settled zamindari estate in the Ramnad sub-division of Madura district, Madras Presidency, British India. Along the estate of Ramnad, it formed one of the two zamindari estates of Ramnad subdivision.

The Sivaganga Kingdom was ruled by a branch of the Maravar|Marava - Semabian Marava] The royal family of Sivaganga ( relatives of Ramnad) ruled the Kingdom of Sivaganga from 1730 to 1801. Raja Sasivarna Tevar was the creator the Kingdom of Sivaganga, created in the year 1730, succeeded by his son Raja Muthuvaduganatha Tevar followed by his wife Rani Velu Nachiar as a consort to her daughter Rani Vellachi Nachiar, who died earlier to Rani Velu Nachiar during her child birth. After the demise of Rani Vellachi Nachiar, it was ruled by Rani Velu Nachiar, who died in the year 1796, after her demise her son in law Raja Peria Venga Udayana Tevar ruled the kingdom from 1796–1801, who also married the daughter of Marudhu brothers,( Rakku Aathal) the ministers who supported their son in law in the succession to the throne of Sivaganga. Raja Peria Venga Udayana Tevar was disqulified by the East India Company under artice 6 of the proclamation of 1801. All three of them were punished by East India Company, Marudhu brothers were executed and their son in law Peria Venga Udayana Tevar was exile to Penang, Malasiya. As per the Court records of the British all the heirs of Raja Peria Venga Udyana Tevar by Rakku Aatthal lost their rights to the kingdom of Sivaganga foreever, not only under the artice 6 of the proclamation of 1801 but also under the orders of her majesty 1863 and 1881. After their death and Exile, the kingdom of Sivaganga was converted into a state and Raja Gauri Vallaba Tevar was appointed as the ruler of the state of Sivaganga not just a Zamindar or land lord. After the end of the company rule it was reduced to a zamindari by the British crown under the order of Her Majesty in ther year 1863, accordingly his daughter Rani Kattama Nachiar was appointed as a Zamindarini, all the daugters of Raja Gauri Vallaba Tevar namely Rani Kattama Nachiar and her elder sister Princess Vella Nachiar taken the joint ownership to the Zamindari family estate of Sivaganga. After the demise of Rani Kattama Nachiar in the year 1877, the son of Pricess Vella Nachiar namely Raja Dorasinga Tevar @ Gauri Vallaba Tevar became the full owner to the family estate of Sivaganga in place of his materna grand father Raja Gauri Vallaba Tevar by the order of her majesty in the year 1881, all the lines of the daughters came to an extinct by taken Raja Dorasinga Tevar as a fresh root. His joint family estate of Sivaganga was abolished in the year 1950 under socialist reform on India's independence. He had five sons and 10 grandsons and 10 great grandsons at the time of abolition. The family estate of Sivaganga consist three roots and three full owners, Raja Sasivarna Tevar was the first root and the first full owner, who was the sovereign king, the second one was Raja Gauri Vallaba Tevar, the ruler of the state of Sivaganga, the third and the last one was Raja Dorasinga Tevar.

== History ==
The Pudukkottai and Sivaganga regions were actually parts of the kingdom of Ramnad when it became independent in the 1680s. In 1725, Ramnad was invaded by the polygar of Nalkottai who captured two-fifths of the kingdom including the territory of Sivaganga.

In 1773, the British conquered Sivaganga and killed Muthu Vaduganatha Periyavudaya Thevar, the king of Sivaganga. His widow, queen Velu Nachiyar, fled to Dindigul and lived under the protection of Hyder Ali. During her exile, she formed an armed force and alliance with Hyder Ali. In 1780, she became the first queen in India to fight against the British colonial power. Till 1796 sivaganga was ruled by Rani Velu Nachiyar. After her death,her son in law Peria Venga Udaya Tevar [ with the help of Maruthu brothers ministers]] ruled the kingdom from 1796-1801. Marudhu brothers were executed by British and Peia Venga Udayana Tevar was exiled to Penag Malasiya. After his exile, the kingdom was converted into a state and handed over by the British to the rightful heir Patamathur Gowri vallaba udayana Tevar, the collateral heir of Raja Sasivarna Tevar, father in law of Rani Velu Nachiar, who created the Kingdom of Sivaganga in the year 1730. Raja Gauri Vallaba Tevar was appointed as a ruler of the state in the year 1801 and died in 1829. And after that it was reduced to a zamindari by the British crown in the year 1863, succeeded by his daugter Rani Kattama Nachiar, she had taken her father's estate as a joint owner along with her eldest sister Princess Vella Nachiar. After the demise of Rani Kattama Nachiar in the year 1877, it was succeeded by Raja Dorasinga Tevar, the younger son of Princess Vella Nachiar. The zamindari belongs to the joint family of Raja Dorasinga Tevar, the last full owner and title holder by the order of Her Majesty 1881. His joint family estate of Sivaganga abolished through socialist reform on India's independence. Maruthu brothers .

In 1803, the British restored the rightful heir Padamathur Gauri Vallaba Tevar @ Udaya Tevar to the throne. As per the Privy Council records the kingdom was converted to the state of Sivaganga and Raja Gauri Vallaba Tevar was not only a Zamindar but appointed as the ruler of the state, after his demise it was subsequently reduced to a zamindari in the year 1863 by the ordrer of the crown.

== Monarchs ==
- Vijaya Raghunatha Sasivarna Periyavudaya Thevar (1730–1750)
- Muthu Vaduganatha Periyavudaya Thevar (1750–1772)
- Velu Nachiyar (1780–1790)
- Vellacci (1790–1793)
- Vangam Periya Udaya Thevar (1793–1801)

Zamindar under British rule (1803–1947)
