= Velu Nachiyar =

Queen of Sivagangai, freedom fighter (1730–1796)

Rani Velu Nachiyar
- Queen of Sivagangai; Princess of Ramanathapuram
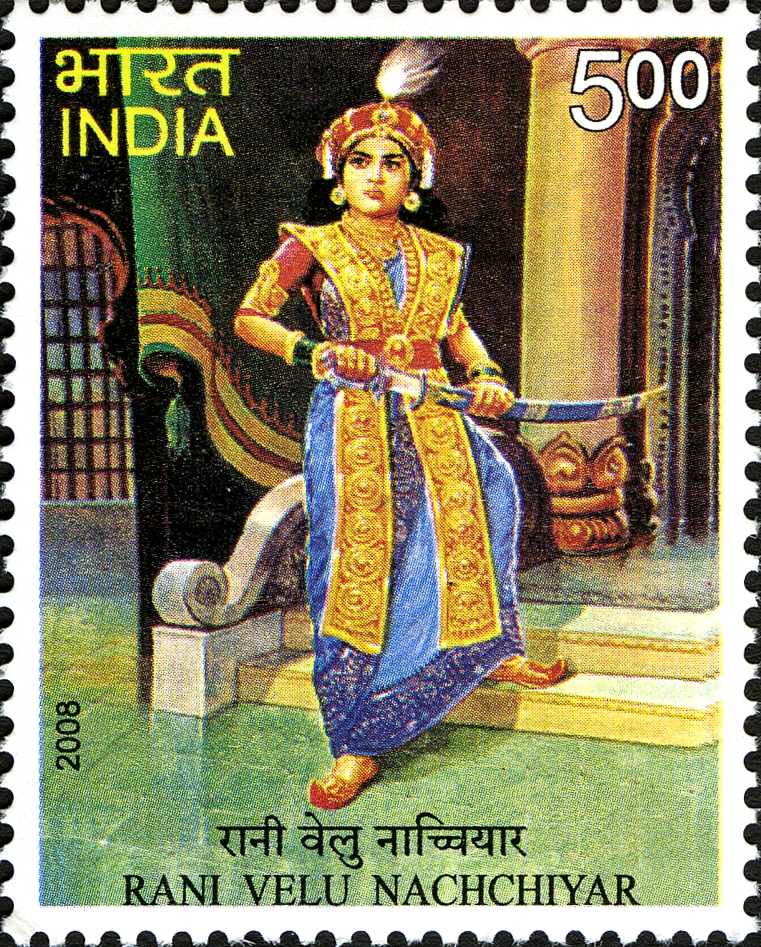
- Velu Nachchiyar on a 2008 stamp of India

Monarch of Sivaganga estate
- Reign: c. 1780-c. 1790
- Coronation: 1780
- Predecessor: Muthu Vaduganatha Periyavudaya Thevar (until 1772)
- Successor: Vellacci
- Born: 3 January 1730; Ramanathapuram, Kingdom of Sivaganga (Modern day Tamil Nadu, India)
- Died: 25 December 1796 (aged 66); Sivaganga, Kingdom of Sivaganga (Modern day Tamil Nadu, India)
- Burial: 25 December 1796; Sivaganga, Tamil Nadu, India
- Spouse: Muthu Vaduganatha Periyavudaya Thevar
- Dynasty: Sethupathi
- Father: Chellamuthu Vijayaragunatha Sethupathy
- Mother: Muthathal Nachiyar

Rani Velu Nachiyar (3 January 1730 – 25 December 1796) was a queen of Sivaganga estate from c. 1780–1790. She was the first Indian queen to wage war with the East India Company (EIC) in India. She is also known by the epithet Veeramangai ("brave woman").

== Life ==
Velu Nachiyar was born on 3 January 1730. She was the princess of Ramanathapuram and the only child of King Chellamuthu Vijayaragunatha Sethupathy and Queen Sakandhimuthathal of the Ramnad kingdom. Nachiyar was trained in many methods of combat, including war match weapons usage, martial arts like Valari, Silambam, Kalaripayattu, horse riding, and archery. She was a scholar in many languages and was proficient in languages like French, English and Urdu. In 1746, she entered into marriage with Muthu Vaduganatha Periyavudaya Thevar, serving as a close advisor, mentor, and confidant to the prince.

When her husband, Muthu Vaduganatha Periyavudaya Thevar, battle was held in maravar manglam 12 km from kalaiyar Kovil.second day killed in attack EIC soldiers in 1772 at KalaiyarKoil, she was drawn into the conflict. Velu Nachiyar ran away from Sivagangai and sought the help of Hyder Ali, Dindigul is border state ruled by Hyder Ali . She stayed in virupaachi fortress.After eight years of planning — along with support of many nattu ambalars, commanders Marudhu brothers, and Thandavarayan Pillai—in war time support by tippu sultan she fought against the British East India Company.

In 1772, Sivaganga minister Thandavarayan Pillai wrote a letter on behalf of Rani Velu Nachiyar to Hyder Ali, looking for military support:

The Nawab of Arcot is encroaching on both Ramanathapuram and Sivaganga kingdoms and wreaking havoc. After escaping from there, I stayed with the Kallar leaders in the forests and continued the revolt. In this effort, anyone who can help me can make even better achievements. Therefore you have five thousand horsemen. If I could send five thousand soldiers, I would be able to bear their allowance and join them in recapturing these two princely states, and also send troops to Madurai and start counter-operations throughout the country. The Polygars there will also cooperate with us.

In 1780, Velu Nachiyar waged war against the British and successfully reclaimed her kingdom. She governed for ten years and died in 1796. In 1790, she was succeeded by her daughter Vellacci. She granted powers to her daughter with the Marudu brothers to help with the administration of the kingdom. Velu Nachiyar died a few years later, on 25 December 1796.

== Popular culture ==
- On 31 December 2008, a commemorative postage stamp in her name was released.
- OVM Dance Academy of Chennai presenting "VELU NACHIYAR" a Grand Dance Ballet on Sivaganga Queen.
- Professor A.L.I., a Tamil-American hip-hop artist, released a song dedicated to Velu Nachiyar entitled "Our Queen" as part of his Tamilmatic album in 2016.
- On 21 August 2017, a grand dance ballet was conducted in Naradha Gana Sabha in Chennai depicting the life history of the queen Velu Nachiyar. The play was directed by Sriram Sharma, who researched on the Queen's life history for almost a decade.

== See also ==
- Indian independence activists
- Indian independence movement
- Kuyili
- Puli Thevar
- Vellore mutiny of 1806
