= Throw stick (hieroglyph) =

Egyptian hieroglyph

T14
(Non-curved)
Throwing stick
in hieroglyphs

The Throw stick hieroglyph of ancient Egypt is an old hieroglyph that dates from the Predynastic Period; it is from the assemblage of hieroglyphs used on the ornamental, or ceremonial cosmetic palettes. It is used on the palettes both as a throwing-stick weapon in the animal hunt being portrayed-(the Hunters Palette), as well as on certain palettes, as a determinative referring to a "foreigner", or "foreign territory".

Ancient Libya, just northwestwards from Lower Egypt, and the Libyans were thought to be the first land portrayed, as well as the savannah-desert land hunters.

The original predynastic throwing-stick was a launched club as seen on archaeological palettes, a predynastic stick from Gebelein-(Aphroditopolis), 35 inches (9 dm) long, and 11 ounces, is at the Turin Museum.

== Linguistic use of 'throw stick' ==
W11 G1 T14
gꜣ "throw-stick"
in hieroglyphs

D36 G17 D36 G1 X1 T15
ꜥmꜥꜣt "throw-stick"
in hieroglyphs

From the earliest Predynastic Ancient Egypt upon the cosmetic palettes, the throwing stick was used to refer to foreigners, or to foreign territory. This use persisted for three millennia till the end of Ancient Egypt and the use of hieroglyphs.

In the Ancient Egyptian language however, the main use of the throwing stick is a determinative, first for foreign territory, but also for actions involved with 'defeating', submission, or the unfortunate. The various words have many spellings, but fall under words meaning: "throw stick", "throw", and "to create". For the composite bird hieroglyph, "to alight", "flutter", "hover"; also "create"-(genetic lineage in the Rosetta Stone).

=== Rosetta Stone usage ===
Three uses of the "composite bird-hieroglyph" occur in the Rosetta Stone; in line R-5-(twice) it refers to the ancestry of Pharaoh Ptolemy V Epiphanes, and presumably his appearing-(epiphanous title) ("Epiphanous Euchaistos"); this is his 'alighting' presumably. The line actually talks of his genetic lineage: "....and the [deeds] of the two gods-lovers of Fathers (Philopatores) who begot him, and of the two Well-doing-(Good Deeds) gods (Euergetai) who caused to exist-(1st hieroglyph), [those who] created-(2nd hieroglyph) him, ...."

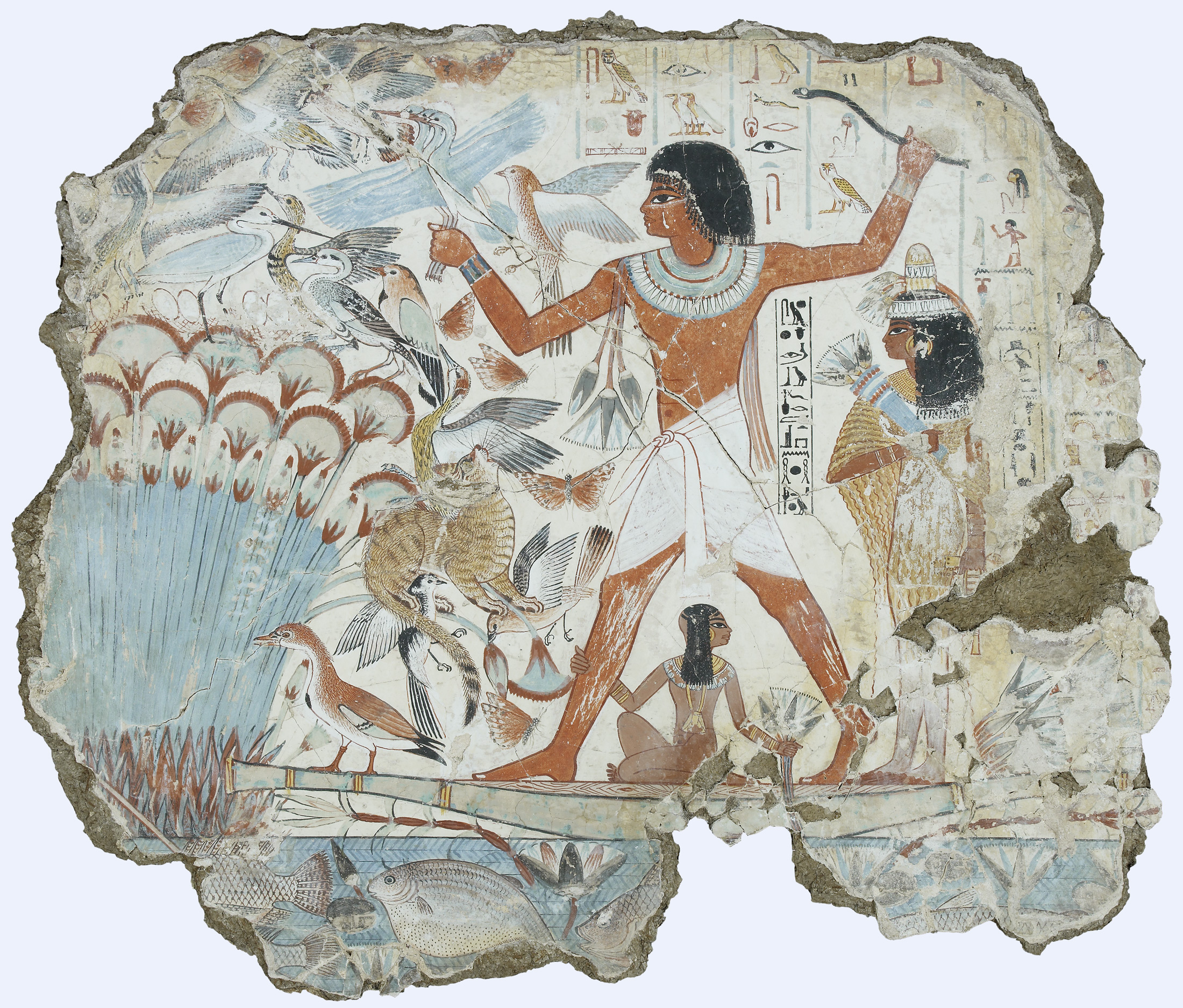
Throwing stick in marsh hunt; life-after-death tomb scene

Elsewhere, for the "Throw-stick hieroglyph", when fashioning a statue by the priests, (lines R7, 9) the use of throw stick determinative: ...."and shall be placed on the side upper of the rectangle, which is on the outside of crowns this, opposite-(2 stick determinatives), to double crown this....". The word seems to refer to the fact that the throw stick can return-(boomerang), and thus the word opposite.

== Iconographic use: from palettes to the marshland ==
Though the origin of the throw stick came from the hunters, as represented on the Predynastic cosmetic palettes, one major use of the throw stick in iconography was the tomb reliefs. Since the Ancient Egyptians were attending to their affairs in the afterlife, the tomb scenes for men often showed swamp scenes, with ducks, fish, other animals, and often the spouse accompanying the deceased being honored; the living deceased men were shown as joyful hunters bringing down the bountiful ducks of the swamps.

=== The famous Narmer Palette ===
The Narmer Palette shows the Horus-falcon upon the defeated people of the Lower Egypt Delta. It is a stylized version of the throw-stick, as the end is hooked within the mouth of a human head, representing the submission of the Delta peoples.

== Throw stick as part of composite hieroglyphs ==
T14 G41
Fluttering Bird
"alight", "flutter", "hover"
in hieroglyphs

The throw stick is used in a composite-formed hieroglyph, not on the standard Gardiner's Sign List. A bird alighting-(perching on a branch), or fluttering is Gardner, bird series, G41. The variant shows a vertical 'branch', indicated with the "throw stick"; the bird is shown attached to the branch.

== See also ==
- Gardiner's Sign List - Warfare, hunting, and butchery
- List of Egyptian hieroglyphs

== Gallery ==
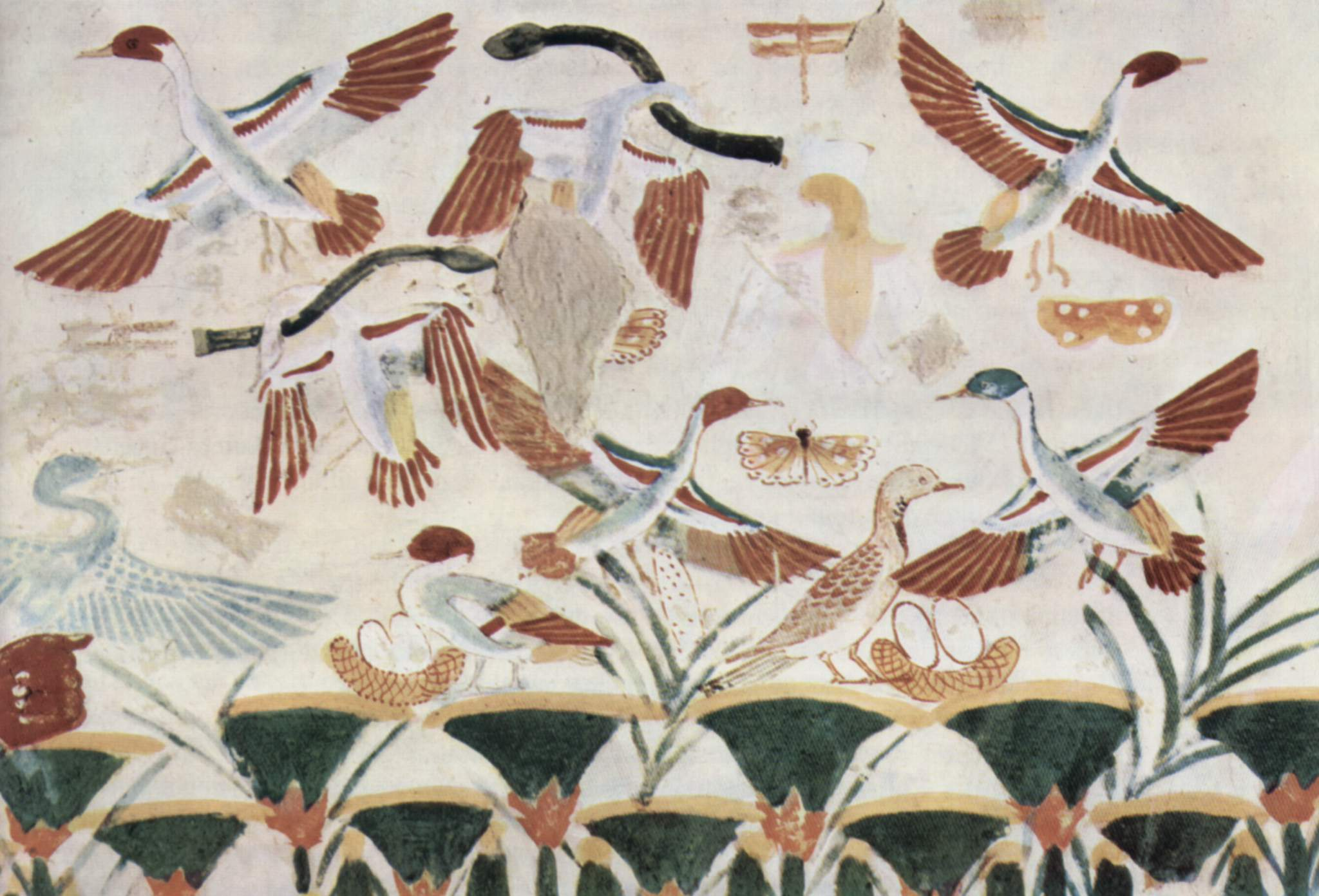
Marshland hunting scene

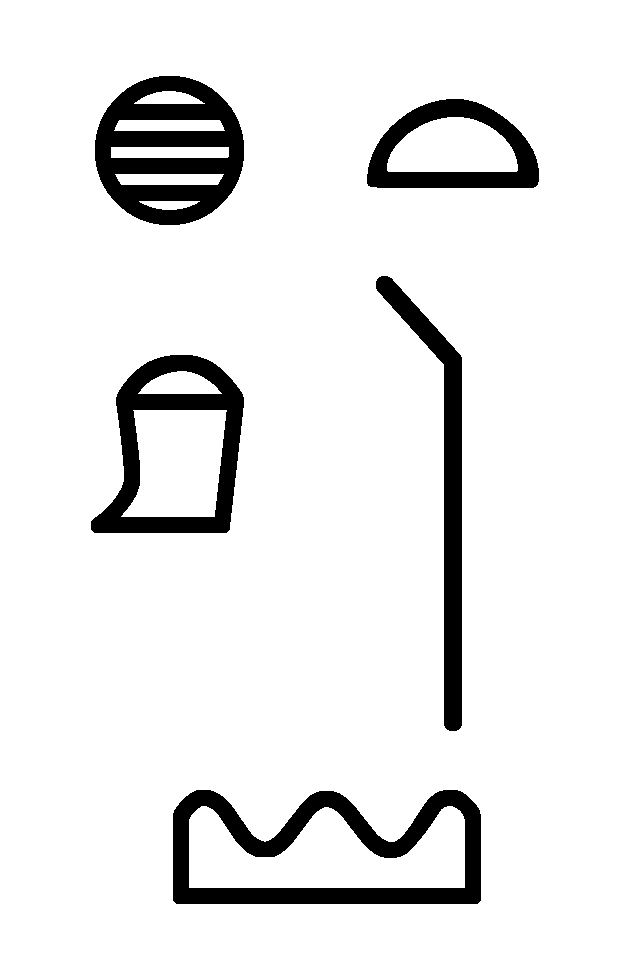
Throw stick as determinative for "Foreign Land", (with "mountain terrain" hieroglyph)

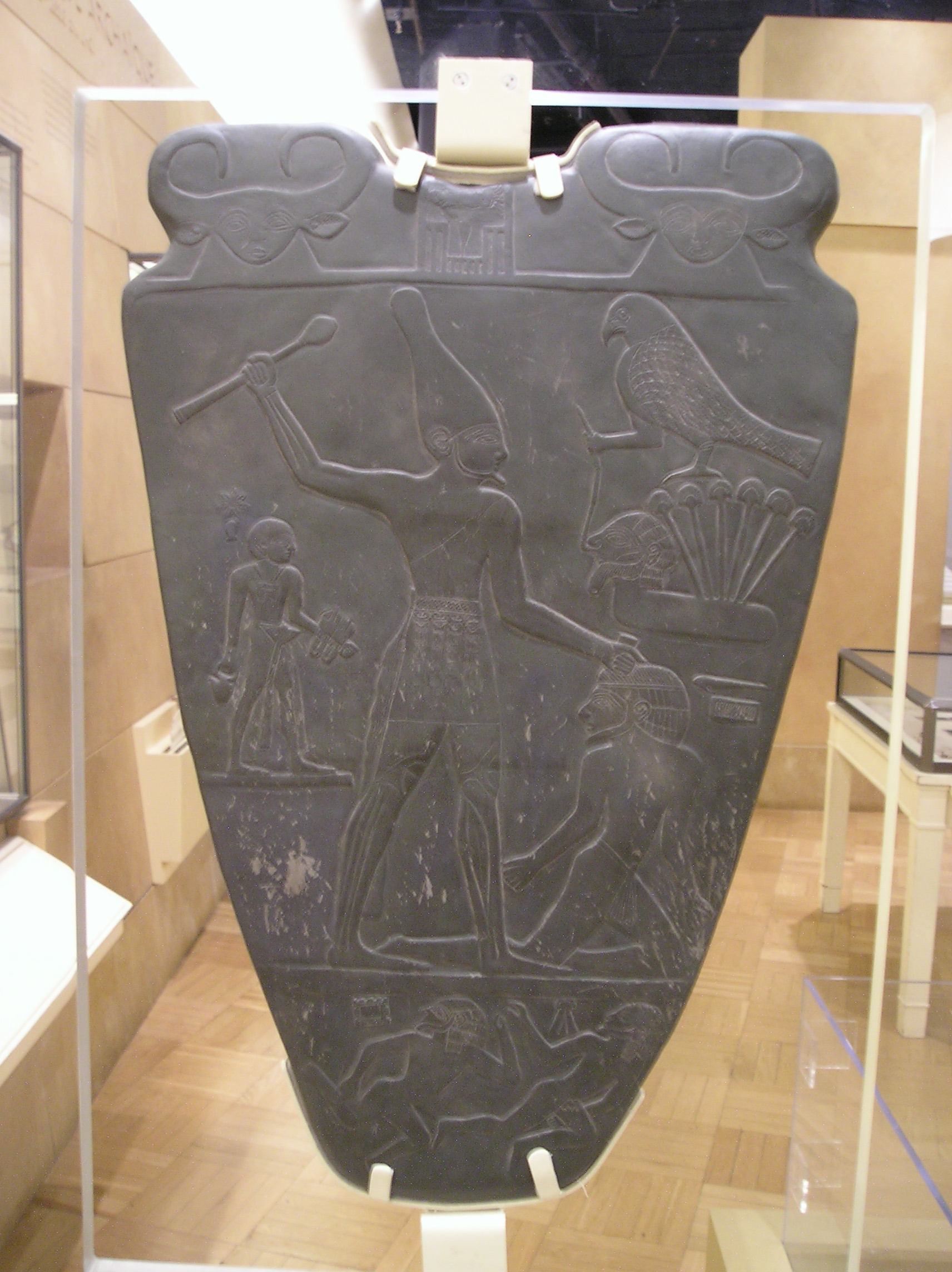
Throwing stick held by Horus-falcon stylizing the captive Lower Egypt Delta

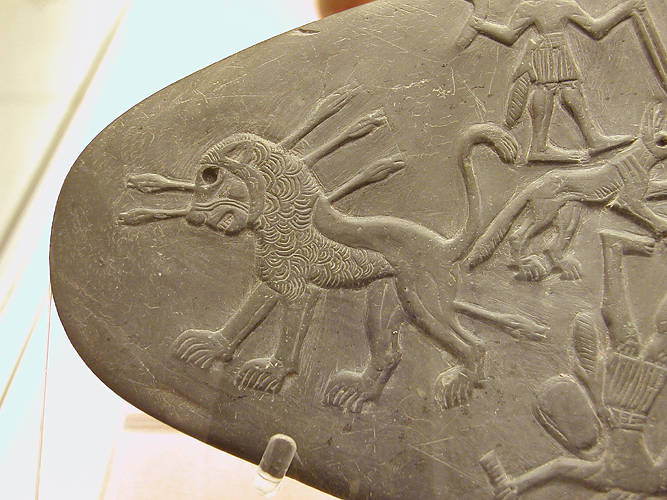
Hunter's Palette close-up

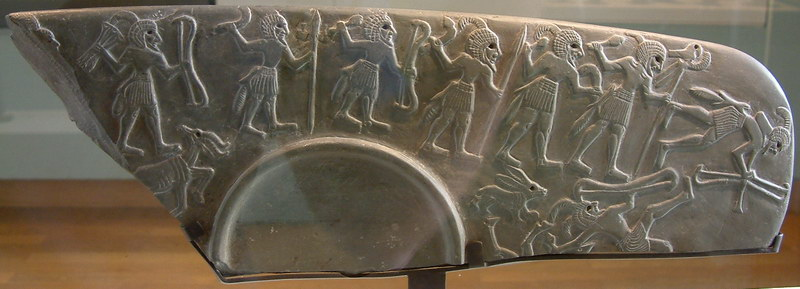
Cosmetic palette use of the throwing stick, in predynastic Egypt, middle to late 4th millennium BC

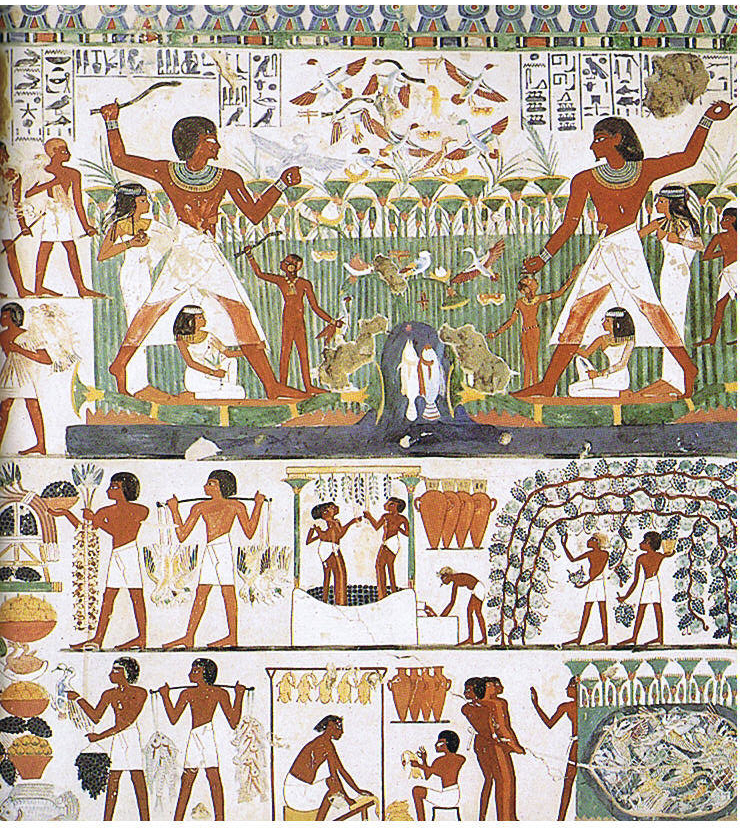
Hunting in the marsh
