= Kalaiyar Kovil =

Temple in India

Arulmigu Sornakaleeswarar Temple, Kalaiyarkovil
- Kalayarkoil
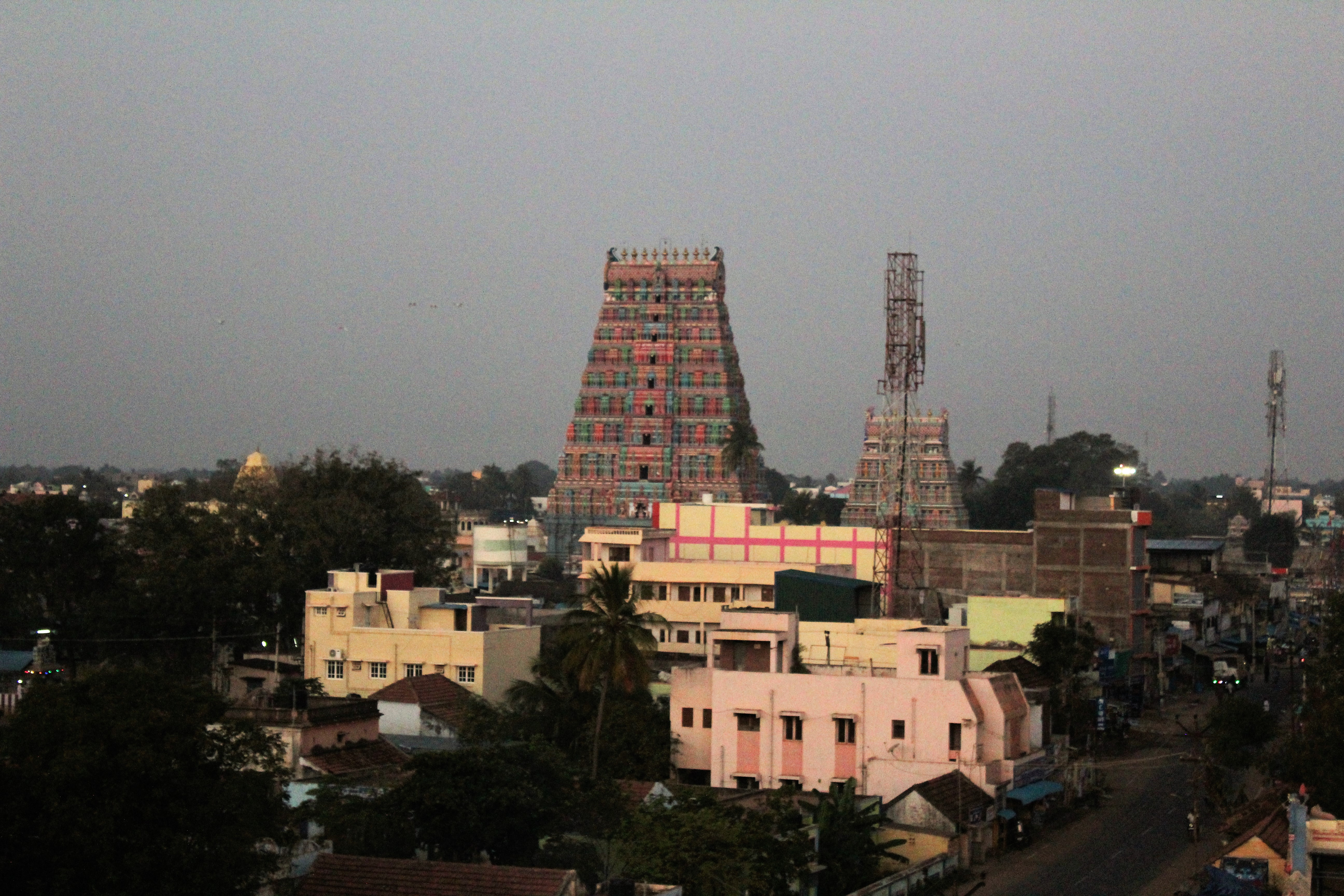
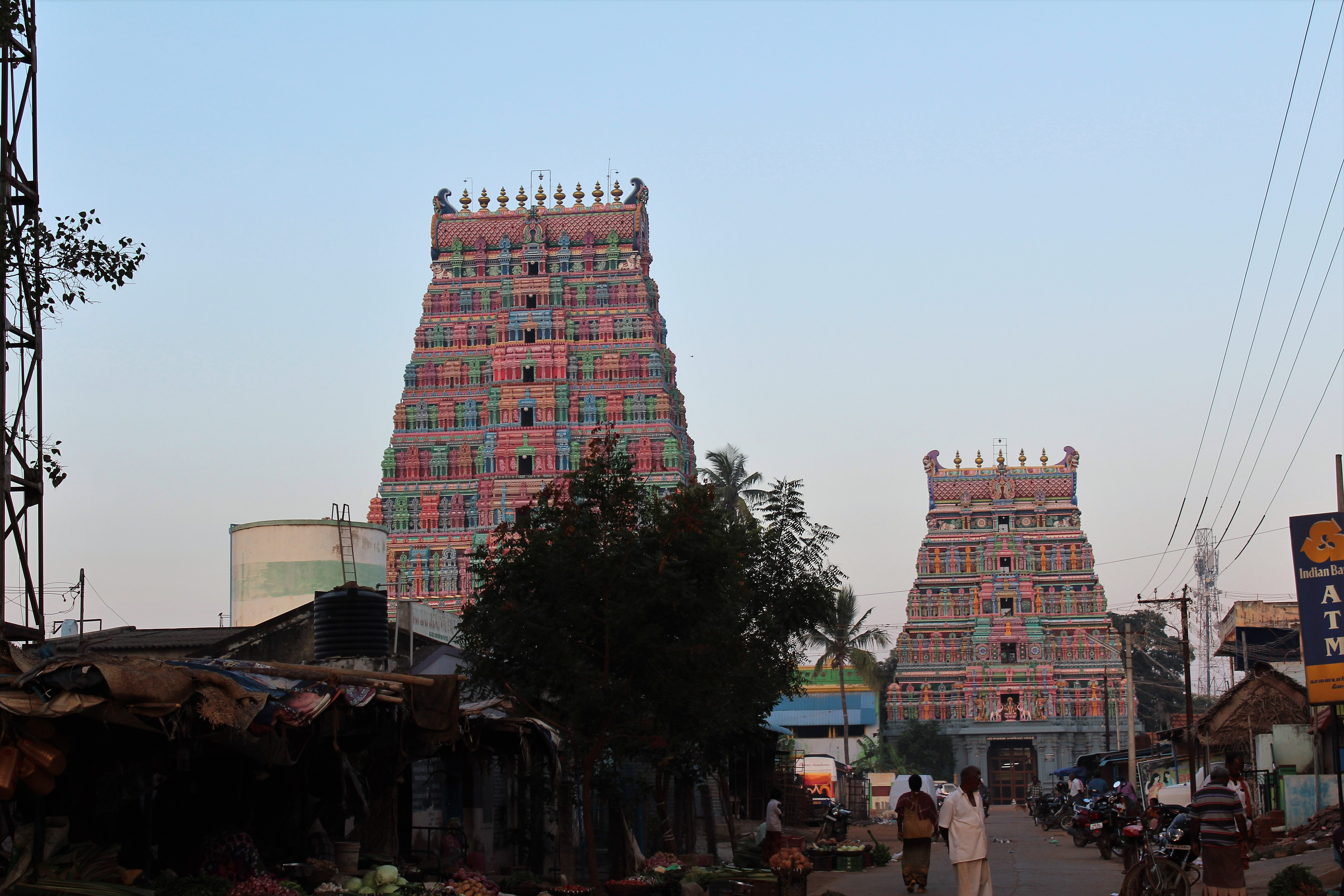
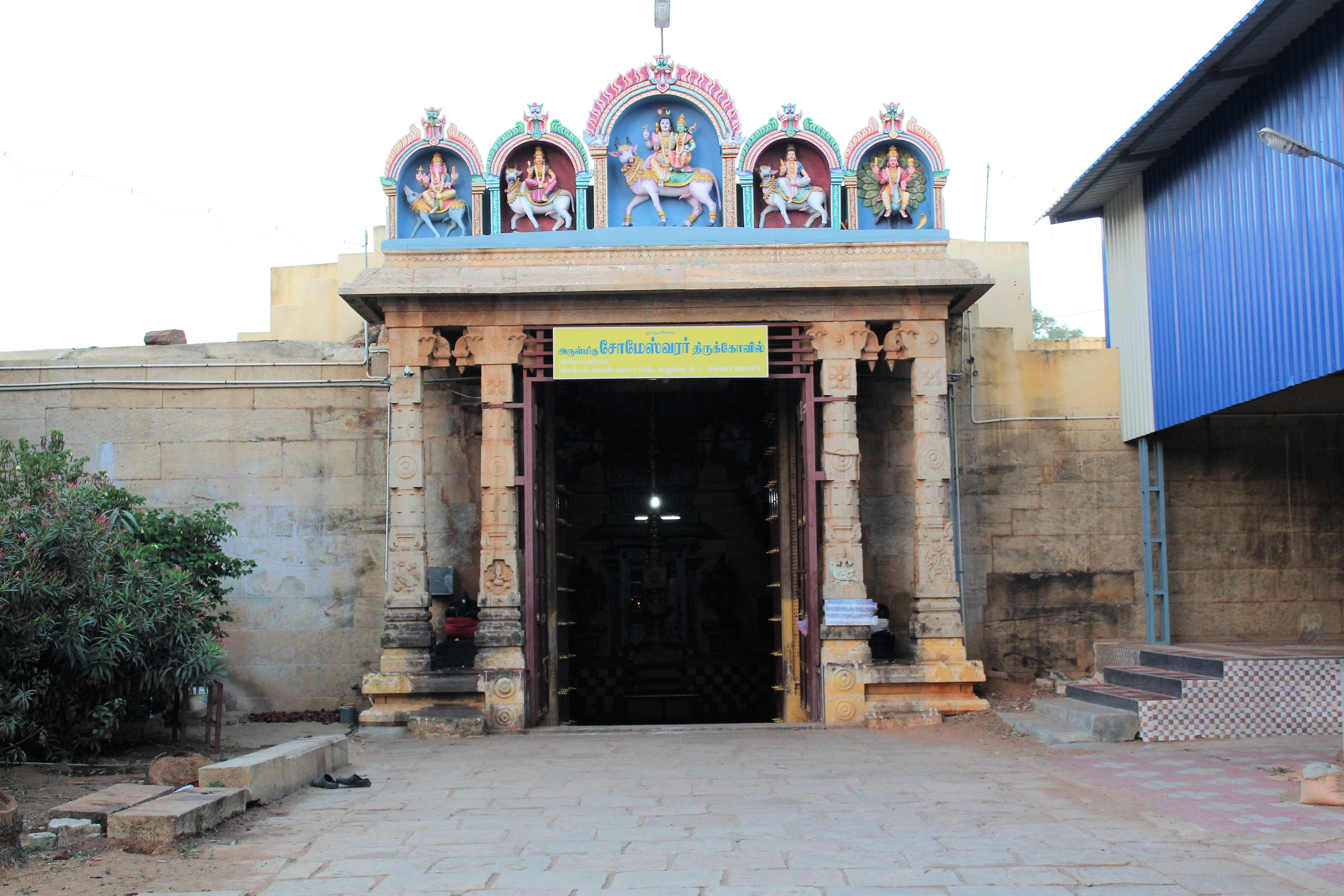
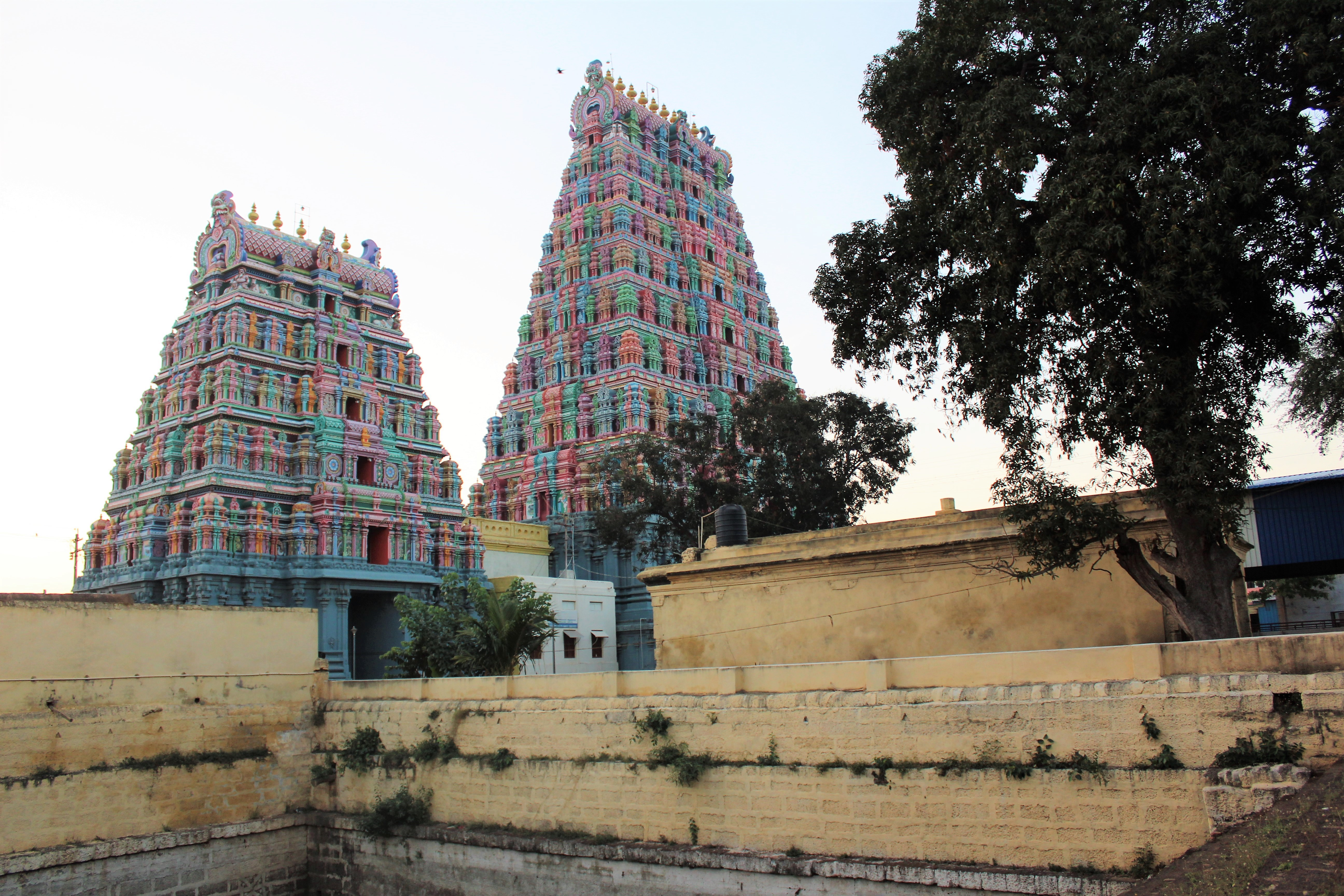
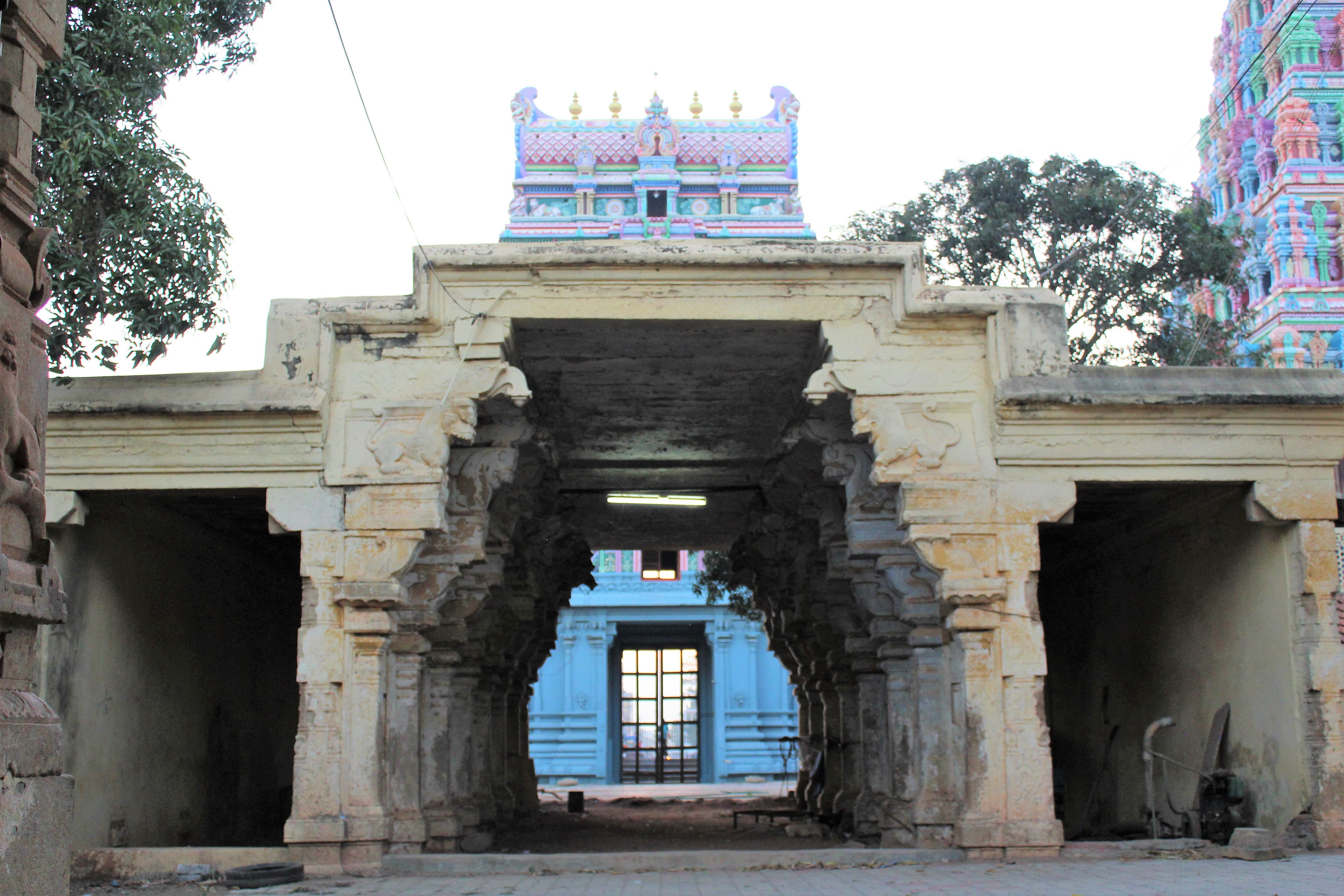
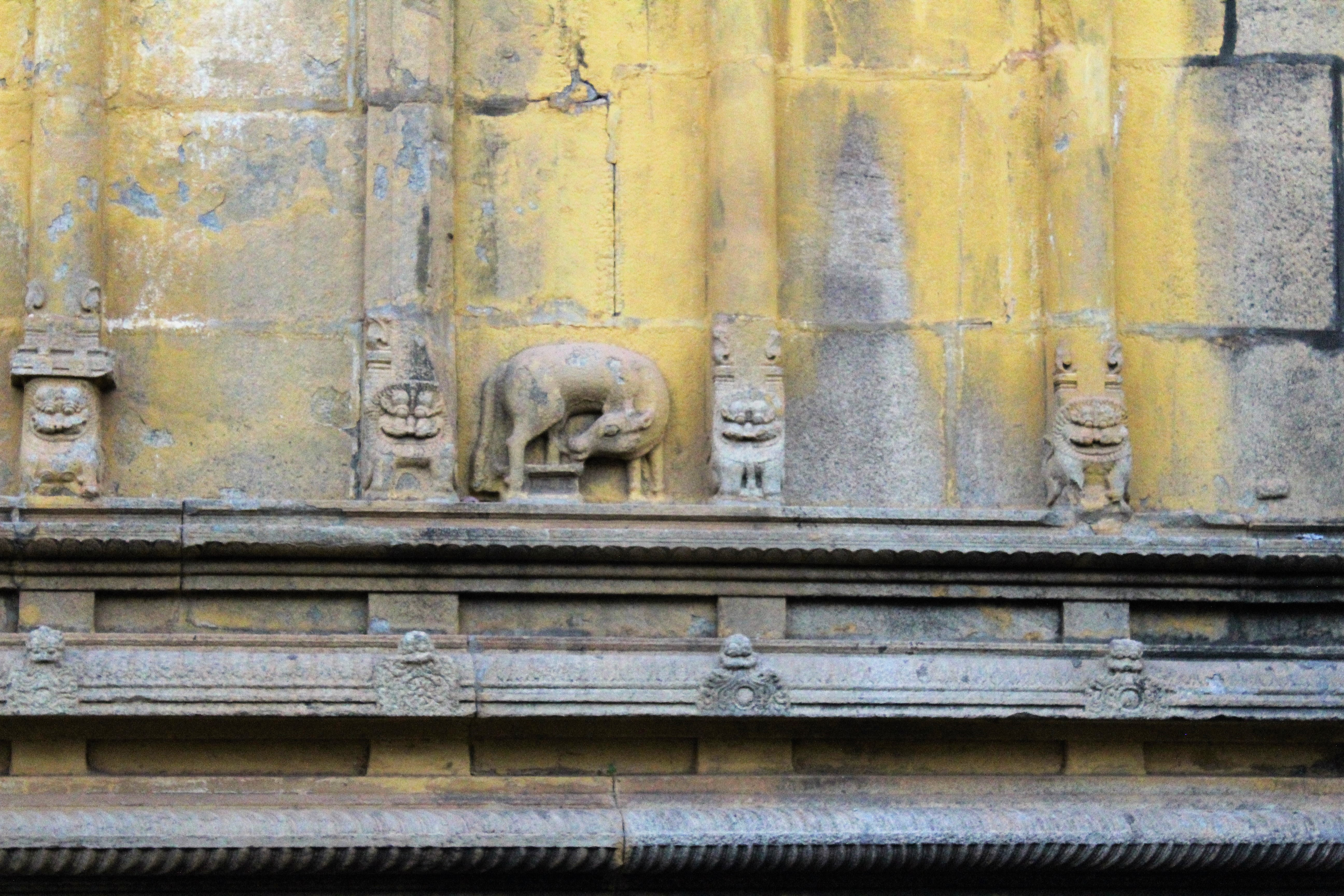
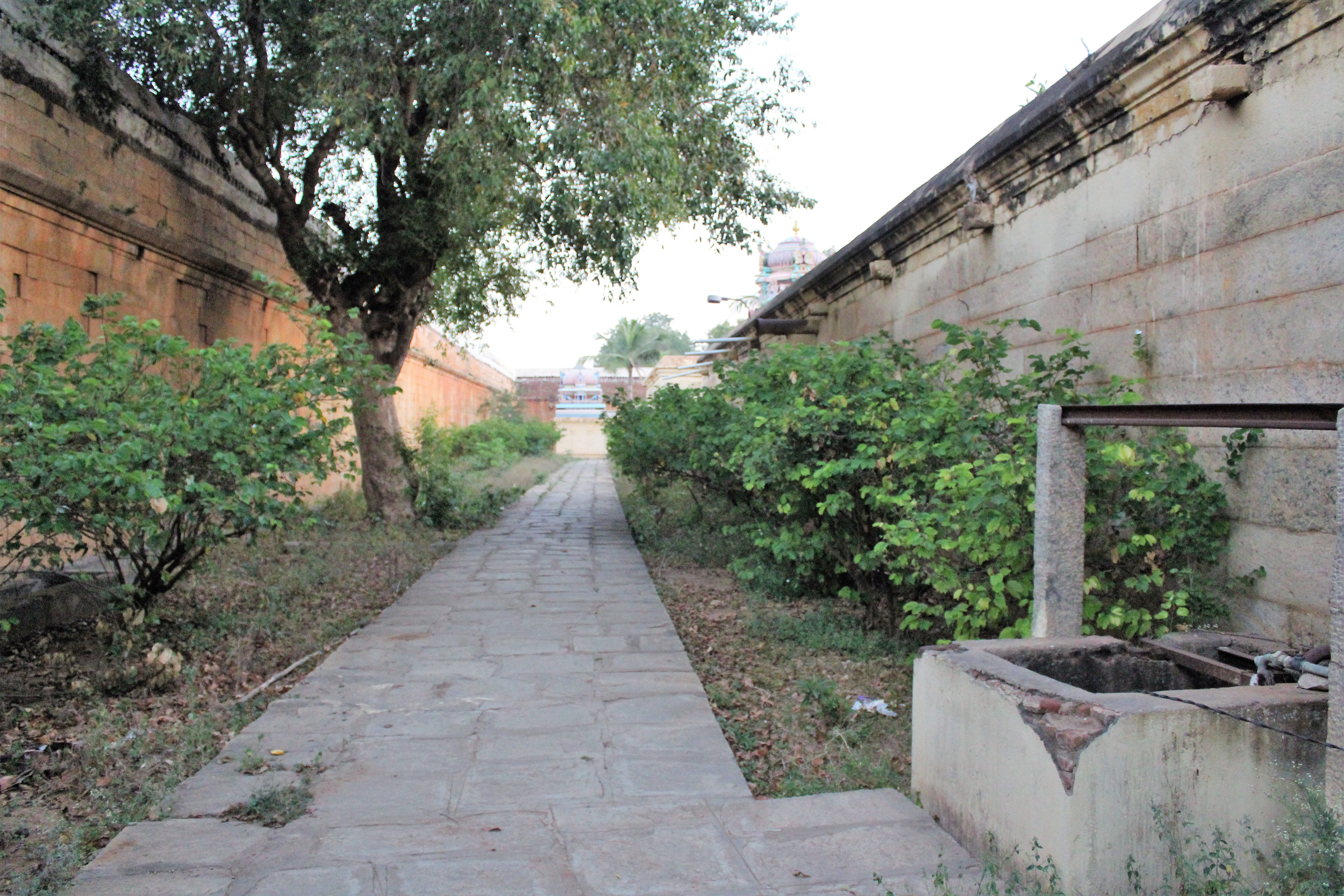
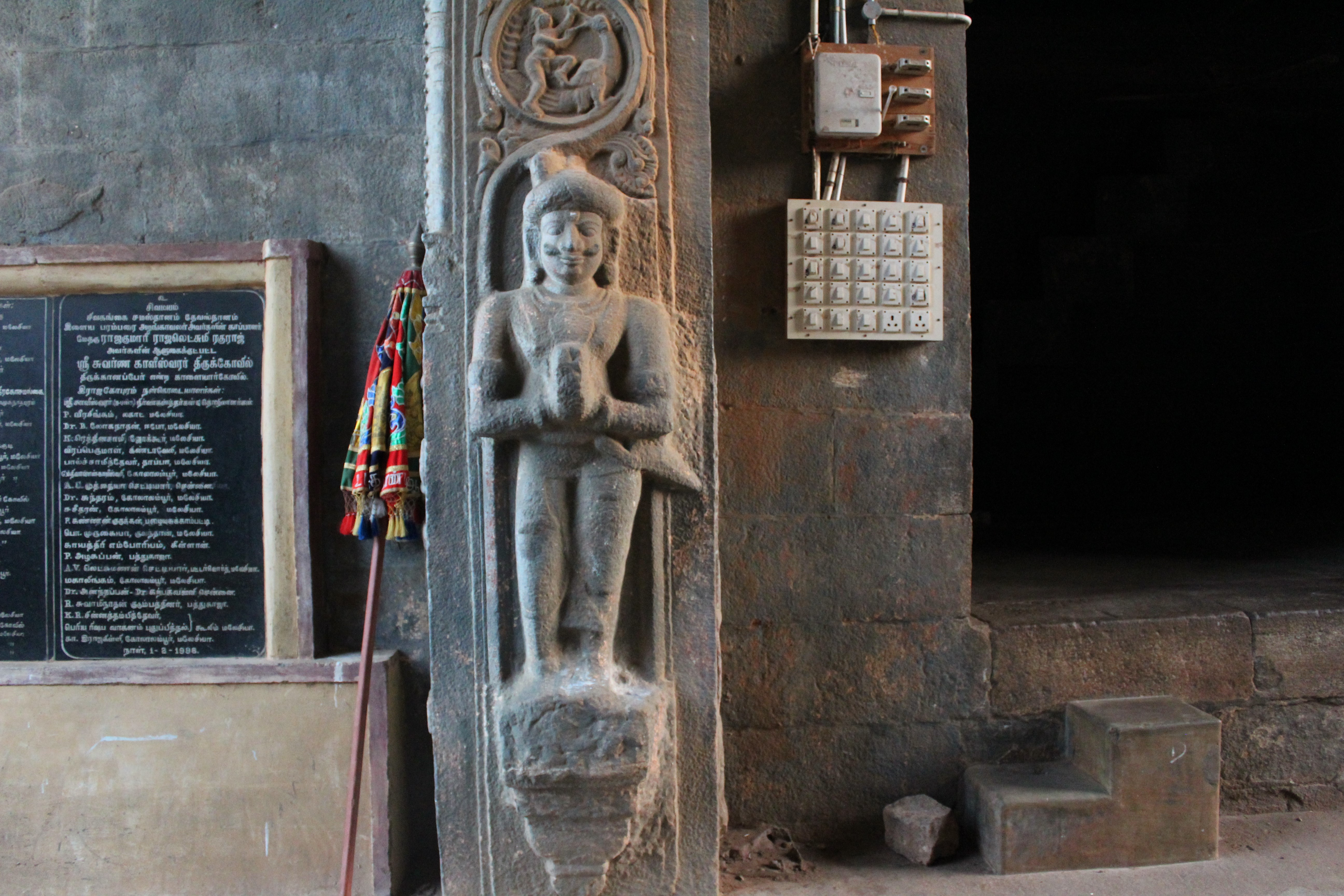
- Kalayarkoil
- Nickname: Thirukanaper
- Kalayarkoil, Tamil Nadu
- Coordinates: 9.8457°N 78.6314°E
- Country: India
- State: Tamil Nadu
- District: Sivaganga
- Region: Pandya Nadu
- Division: Madurai
- Seat: Panchayat Union Office of kalaiyarkovil

Government
  - Type: Block
  - Body: Kalayarkoil Panchayat Union

Area
  - Total: 25 km^{2} (9.7 sq mi)
- Elevation: 94 m (308 ft)

Languages
  - Official: Tamil
- Time zone: UTC+5:30 (IST)
- PIN: 630551
- Telephone code: 04575
- Vehicle registration: TN-63
- Distance from Madurai: 63 kilometres (39 mi) west (Road)
- Distance from Trichirapalli: 120 kilometres (75 mi) north (Rail)
- Distance from Rameswaram: 134 kilometres (83 mi) south (Rail)

The Kalaiyar Kovil is a Hindu temple in Sivaganga, Tamil Nadu, India.

== Name ==
Kalaiyar Kovil derives its name from the Kaleeswarar temple. Kalaiyar is a corruption of the word Kaleeswaran. During the Sangam period, it was known as Kaanapair, as can be seen from the 21st verse in the purananooru sung by Iyur moolakizhar, a poet of the Sangam period. In the ninth century, Sundarar described the presiding deity in his devotional songs as b. Since then the deity was known as Kalaiyar, with the Tamil suffix yar added to it to denote respect. The temple came to be known as Kalaiyar Kovil and this was later adapted to the place. It is one of the shrines of the 275 Paadal Petra Sthalams.

== Structure ==
A gateway tower (150 feet [46 m]) and an imposing Teppakkulam tank (with a mandapam) named Aanai Madu adorn this shrine. Airavatam, the elephant of Indra is said to have created this tank. There are three shrines in this temple associated with the three functions of creation, preservation and completion. The Maruthu Pandiyars built a big wall around the temple to safe guard the temple but it was demolished by the Britishers during the war; Colonel James Welsh wrote all the details and drawing of the castle in his book Military Reminiscences 2. The presiding deity Lord Shiva is called Kaaleeshwarar, Someshwarar, Sundareshwarar, and Ambal; his consort mother Parvati is called as Swarnambikai, Soundara Nayaki, and Meenakshi. In addition, there are three separate shrines for male and female deities of famous Shiva temples in a mandapam outside the shrine.

== Royal seat ==
Kalaiyarkoil was a royal seat from very early days. King Vengai Marban ruled over this area during the Sangam period. It served as the stronghold of the rulers of Sivangangai. It was also the seat of the sivaganga rulers like Muthu Vatuka Natha Thevar and the Maruthu brothers.

== Legend ==
KaliDevi fought against chandasuran at kalayarkovil. She prayed the kaleeswarar lingam and joined hands with saptha mathargal and won the battle. That is why the place is named as kalipuram.

Dhakshinakalaipuram, jothiwanam, mandharavanam, mokshapradam, kaandhaaram, dhavasthikaram, vedhaaruvanam, bhoologakailaayam, makaakaalapuram, akashathiyapuram are other names of the kalayarkoil.

== History ==
Thirukanapper Udayan, a small land king, came in the 13th century under the rule of Tribhuvana Emperor Maravarman Sundara Pandya and set the town as his capital.

On 25 June 1772, the Company forces under Col. Joseph Smitt and Cap. Bonjour marched towards Kalayar Kovil. The second king of Sivaganga, Muthu Vaduga Natha Thevar (1750–1772). The third ruler of the Kingdom of Sivaganga was Rani Velu Nachiyar. She reigned from 1772 to 1780. After Velu Nachiyar's reign, the Marudu brothers, Periya Marudu and Chinna Marudu, governed the kingdom. They are the fourth king of sivaganga Maruthu brothers.

Rajah Muthu Vaduganatha Thevar, in anticipation of the English invasion, made preparations for defense. But Rajah Muthu Vaduganatha Thevar, with many of his soldiers, died in battle. The invading English forces plundered Kalaiyarkoil and collected jewels worth 50,000 pagodas. Afterwards, Rani Velu Nachiyar, defeated the English invasion and took control of Sivagangai. A statue of the Fourth King of sivaganga Maruthu Pandiyar and their chief commander Udhaya Perumal Gounder, who died in the war, is also installed in the temple premises.

The temple belongs to the Hindu Religious and Charitable Endowments Department.

== Festivals ==
Kaaleesar's festival is celebrated in the month of Thai, where the car festival is observed during the Poosam. Someswarar's Bhrammotsavam is celebrated in the Tamil month of Vaikasi. Aadi Pooram is celebrated for Swarnavalli amman.

Maruthu Pandiyar Gurupoojai is celebrated every year on 27 October as an honour for the Fourth king of Sivaganga Maruthu Pandiyars. People from various parts visit kalayarkovil by cars, buses and bikes to get dharshan from god maruthiruvars.

Kalaiyar Kovil is a Town and a Panchayat Union in Sivaganga District, Tamil Nadu, India. Kalayarkoil is a Taluk in Sivaganga District of Tamil Nadu State, India. It is located 18 km east from District headquarters Sivaganga.466 km from State capital Chennai.

== Location ==
The famous sorna Kaleeswara temple is in kalayarkoil, Sivaganga District, 18 km (11 mi) east of Sivagangai. NH-85 thondi- madurai-cochin National Highways connects kalayarkoil with other major towns.SH 29 connects kalaiyarkoil with paramakudi, Ilayangudi, karaikudi.

== Industry ==
The National Textile Corporation has a mill in the town previously known as Kaleeswara mills B unit. The majority of inhabitants are dependent on agriculture. The service sector is growing rapidly.

== Tourism ==
Major tourism attractions are the kalayarkoil temple and King Periya Maruthupandiyar Temple opposite to it. Among the nearest important places, Kollangudi kali Temple is one of prominent Hindu shaktam worship shrines.

== Archaeology ==
A sculpture of a king on an elephant from the 15th century was discovered near Pandiyan Fort in Kalayarkoil.

Potsherds with inscriptions and artifacts (e.g. “Mosidhaban” in Tamil) were found near Kalayarkoil.

Iron Age to medieval artifacts from sites like Ellanthakarai show long cultural continuity.

== Education ==
The District Institute of Education and Training (DIET), Kalayarkoil, is located here. It began functioning on 28 April 1993.

Other local schools (government, higher secondary etc.) exist; the temple complex has historical inscriptions referencing land grants by local donors.

== Transport ==
Kalaiyarkoil is well connected with major towns through buses. Direct buses to Trichy, Madurai, Sivaganga, Karaikudi, Tanjore, Kumbakonam, Paramakudi, and Pattukottai are available.The nearest airport is Madurai Airport 63 kilometres (39 mi) away. The nearest railway stations are Sivaganga railway station, 18 kilometres (11 mi) away, and Kallal railway station 16 kilometres (9.9 mi) away.

== Geography ==
Kalayarkoil has an average elevation of 94 metres (308 ft). The town has a tropical wet and dry climate. The maximum temperature during summer is 37 °C (99 °F) and during winter 28 °C (82 °F). The minimum temperature varies from 23.9–27.8 °C (75.0–82.0 °F). The seasonal climate conditions are moderate. The town gets the majority of its rainfall during the north east monsoon period. The average annual rainfall is 93.1 centimetres (36.7 in).

Climate data for Kalayarkoil
Month	Jan	Feb	Mar	Apr	May	Jun	Jul	Aug	Sep	Oct	Nov	Dec	Year
Mean daily maximum °C (°F)	28.6 (83.5)	30.3 (86.5)	32.1 (89.8)	35.8 (96.4)	37.0 (98.6)	37.0 (98.6)	34.9 (94.8)	33.6 (92.5)	33.5 (92.3)	31.7 (89.1)	30.1 (86.2)	28.5 (83.3)	32.8 (91.0)
Mean daily minimum °C (°F)	23.9 (75.0)	23.8 (74.8)	24.8 (76.6)	27.1 (80.8)	27.8 (82.0)	27.3 (81.1)	26.7 (80.1)	26.3 (79.3)	26.0 (78.8)	25.5 (77.9)	24.7 (76.5)	24.1 (75.4)	25.7 (78.2)
Average rainfall mm (inches)	30.4 (1.20)	11.5 (0.45)	18.1 (0.71)	49.2 (1.94)	75.1 (2.96)	47.9 (1.89)	64.2 (2.53)	73.4 (2.89)	91.7 (3.61)	181.6 (7.15)	196.5 (7.74)	91.9 (3.62)	931.5 (36.69)
Source: yr.no

== See also ==
- Maruthu Pandiyar
- Sivaganga
- Velu Nachiyar
- Hindu temple
- Karaikudi
- Arulmigu Sornakaleeswarar Temple, Kalaiyarkovil
