= Vellacci =

Vellachi Nachiyar
- Queen of Sivaganga

Monarch of Sivaganga estate
- Reign: c. 1790-c. 1793
- Predecessor: Velu Nachiyar
- Successor: Vangam Periya Udaya Thevar
- Born: 1770; Sivagangai, Tamil Nadu, India
- Died: 1793 (aged 22–23); Sivagangai
- Father: Muthu Vaduganatha Periyavudaya Thevar
- Mother: Velu Nachiyar

Vellacci or Vellachi Nachiyar (1770-1793) was the second ruling queen of Sivaganga estate in 1790–1793. She was the daughter of Muthu Vaduganatha Periyavudaya Thevar and Velu Nachiyar. She was made the heir to the throne of Sivagangai by her mother Velu Nachiyar after the recapture of Sivagangai from the East India Company. In 1791, Vellachi married to Vengum Periya Udaya Thevar. In 1793 she succumbed to an illness, as did her infant daughter who was 1 year old.
