= Valari =

Type of throwing club

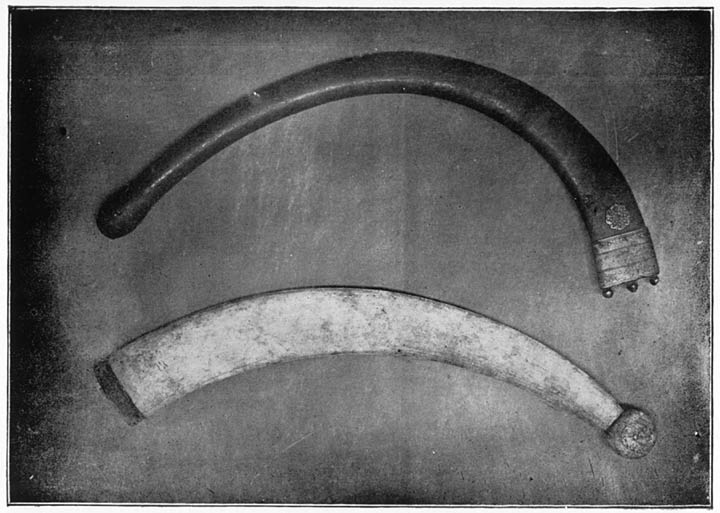
- Type: Throwing weapon
- Place of origin: Sivaganga, Tamil Nadu, India

Service history
- Used by: India

Production history
- Variants: www.valari.org

A valari (Tamil: வளரி) is a traditional weapon, primarily used by the Tamil people of the Indian subcontinent. The valari resembles, and is used similarly to a boomerang or throwing stick. It was used by the Tamil people in ancient battles, for protecting cattle from predators, and for hunting. The British called valari "collery-sticks" after the Kallar caste that used them.

The valari has a long history, dating back to pre-historic times. Valaris are described in the Tamil Sangam Purananuru: a historical version of the Sangam literature, the Purananuru 233rd Poem, mentions the thigri or valari. Weapons similar to this were also called Valaithadi, Tigiri, Paravallai, Cuḻalpaṭai, Kallartadi and Pataivattam.

The techniques and philosophies of valari are long periods of interaction with Tamil (India) peoples, cultures, and Traditional Arts. Valari is a synthesis of the game which is played in various methods with same name. Valari received international exposure from 2018 onwards, demonstrated and played in various states of India. In 2018, the International Valari Federation (IVF) came into existence and compiled standard rules. After formation of the IVF, the 1st National Valari Championship were held in Vellore on 16 December 2018, 2nd National Valari Championship were held in Lucknow, UP on 27 October 2019, and 3rd National Valari Championship were held in Chennai on 14 March 2021. The International Valari Federation has given new shape to the rules and has the right to modify them.

== Construction ==
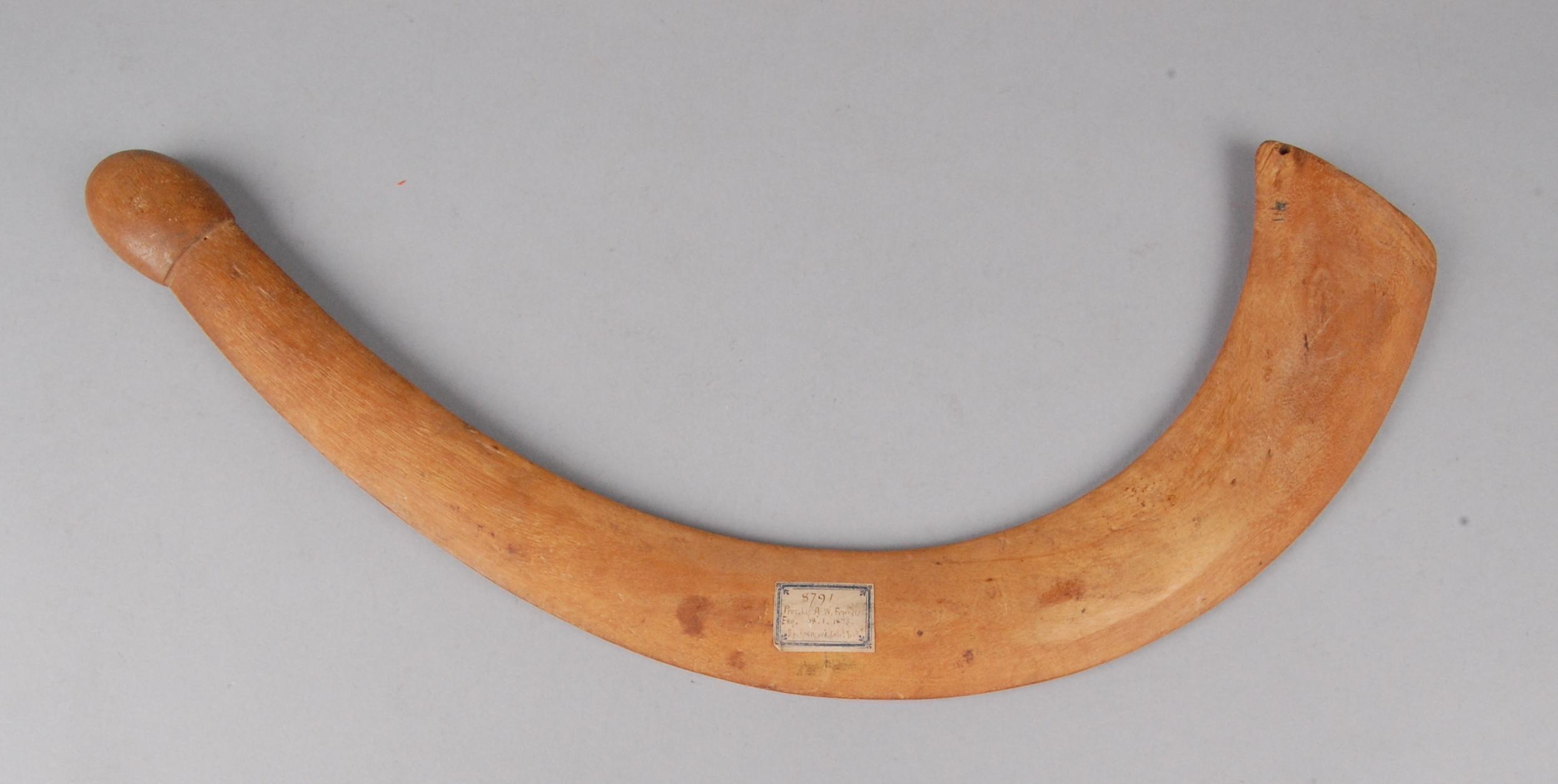
A valari made of wood at the British Museum

The valari is a traditional art of Tamil Nadu, India. IVF has worked toward developing a traditional sport of valari. In 2018, the IVF declared “Valari” as The Mother of All Traditional Arts and formed a separate commission as the “International Valari Federation (IVF)”. The IVF was inaugurated and hosted first organization in the world for Valari sport. The primary objective of which was to lay the foundation for the future of Valari. IVF became the most important world governing body for Valari.

Valaris are made in many shapes and sizes. The usual form consists of two limbs set at an angle; one thin and tapering, the other rounded to form a handle. Valaris are usually made of iron cast in moulds, although some may have wooden limbs tipped with iron or have sharpened edges while others have been made from ivory.

== History and usage ==
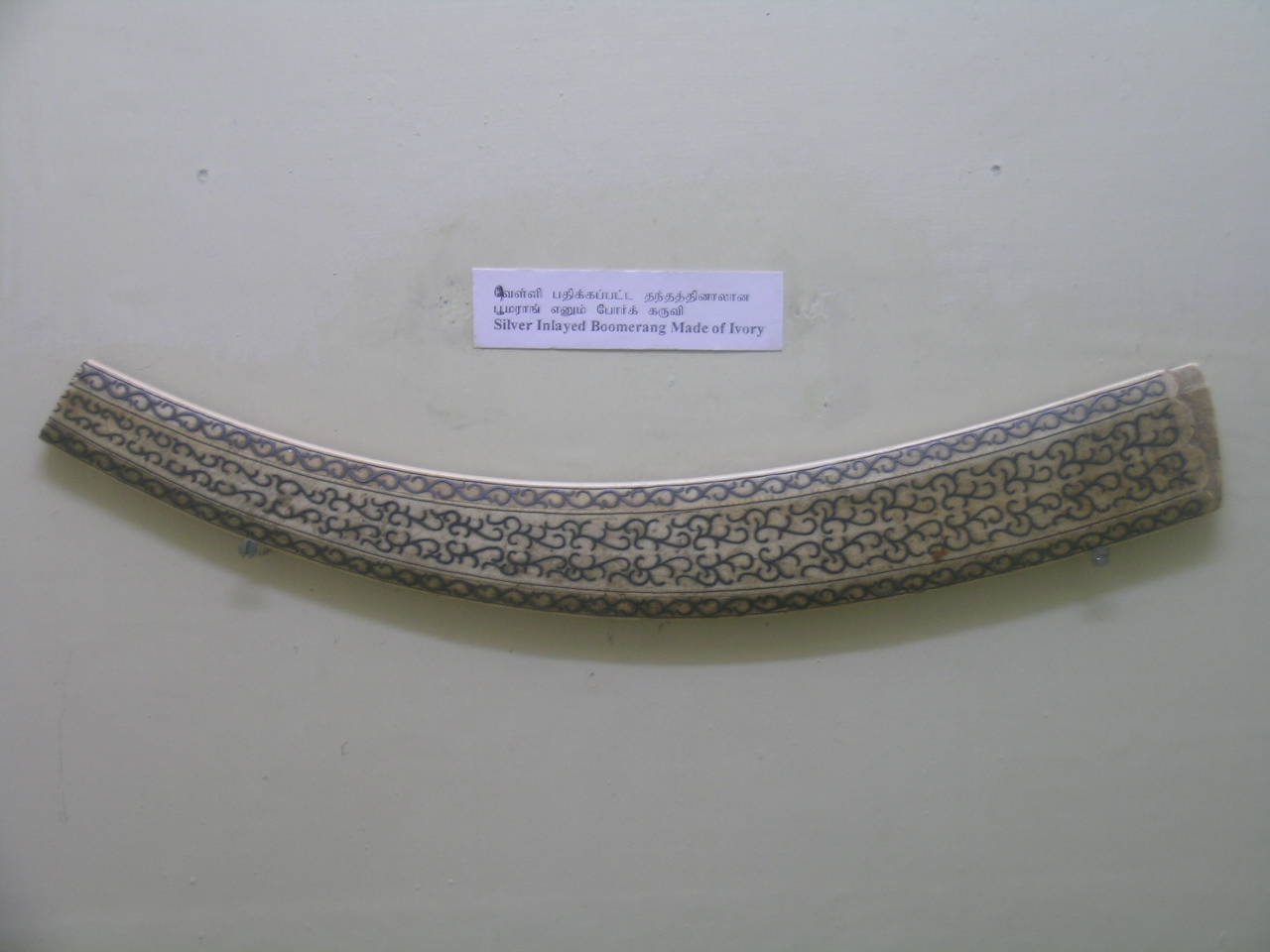
A valari made of ivory and inlayed with silver.

There are several ways of throwing and aiming. It is usually given a spin while throwing. While flying through the air, it can maneuver and execute several types of movements according to the throwers purpose. It may spin in the vertical axis, horizontal axis, or without spinning. The spin may also vary in speed. A lethal throw is given a spin and aimed at the neck. A non-lethal throw is given a spin and aimed at the ankles or knees. This is to capture a fleeing victim. A simple hurting blow does not have any spin. It is sharp enough to cut through a person's neck during war.

It was used for wars and hunting by the Kallar and Maravar clans of Tamil Nadu. It is recorded that Marudhu brothers were experts at throwing Valaris. In The Hindu article 'The deadly weapon that exemplified Tamil spirit' dated 3 June 2016 Madurai MP Su.Venkatesan says, "It is said that there were experts in the art of throwing the valari who could at one stroke despatch small game and even man. But now it reposes peacefully in the households of the descendants of Kallar and Maravar warriors who plied it with such deadly effect." The English destroyed most of the valaris when they came for conquest as they thought it would be a potential weapon of war. Only a handful of valaris are left in Tamil Nadu now. The erstwhile rulers of Kallar and Maravar dynasties preserve them at their palaces now. The remaining Valaris are kept for worship by these clans during special occasions such as Ayudhapooja. Valaris taken from Tamil Nadu are kept at museums all over the world.

It was also exchanged between the bride and bridegroom families of Kallars. British archaeologist Robert Bruce Foote had recalled the old saying “send the valari and bring the bride". The Pudukkottai kings always kept valari weapons in their arsenal.
