= Maruthu Pandiyar =

Indian revolutionaries

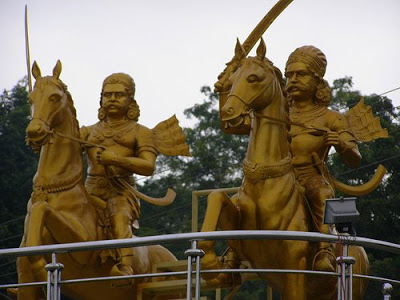
- Born: Mukkulam, Tamil Nadu

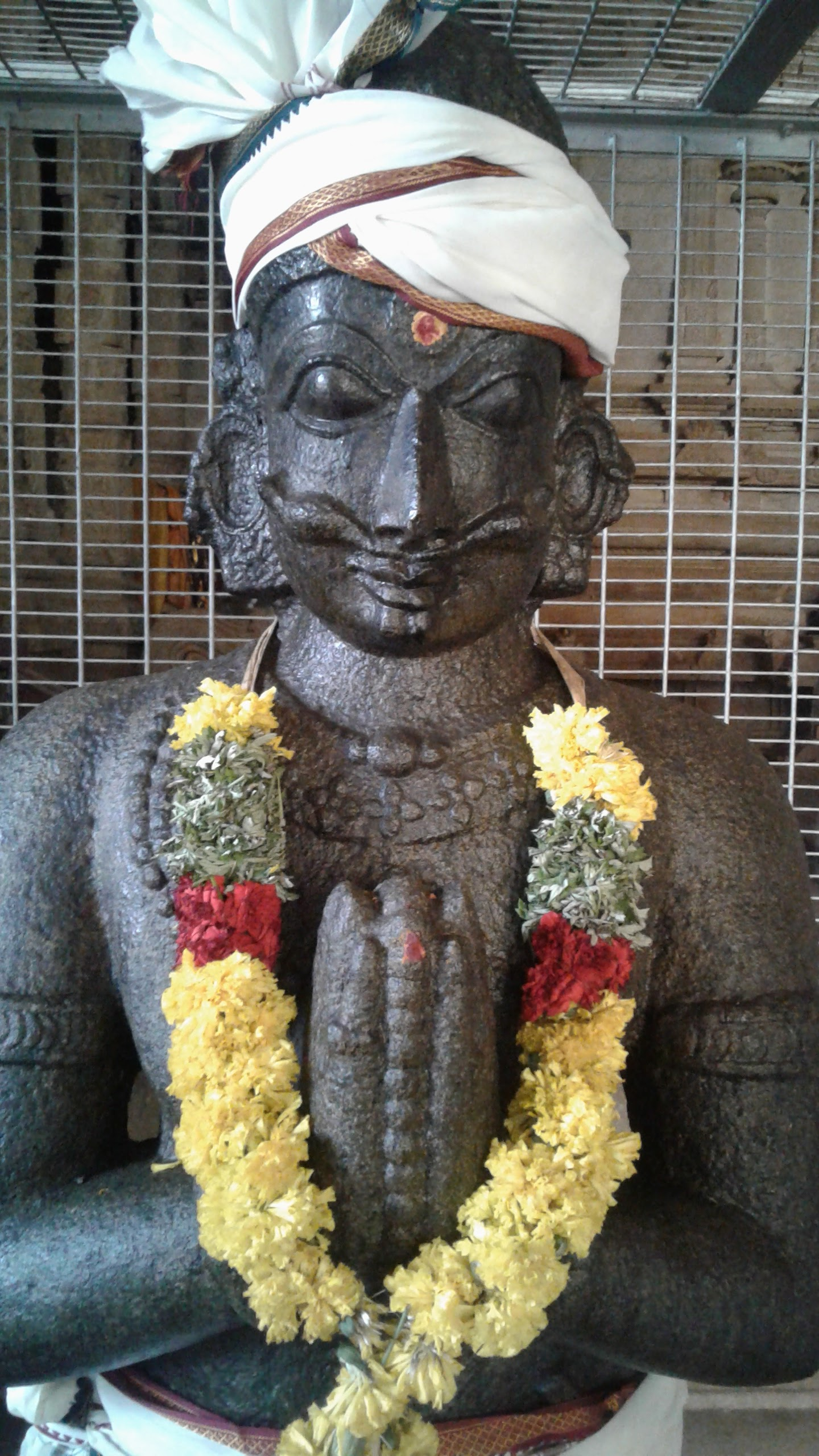
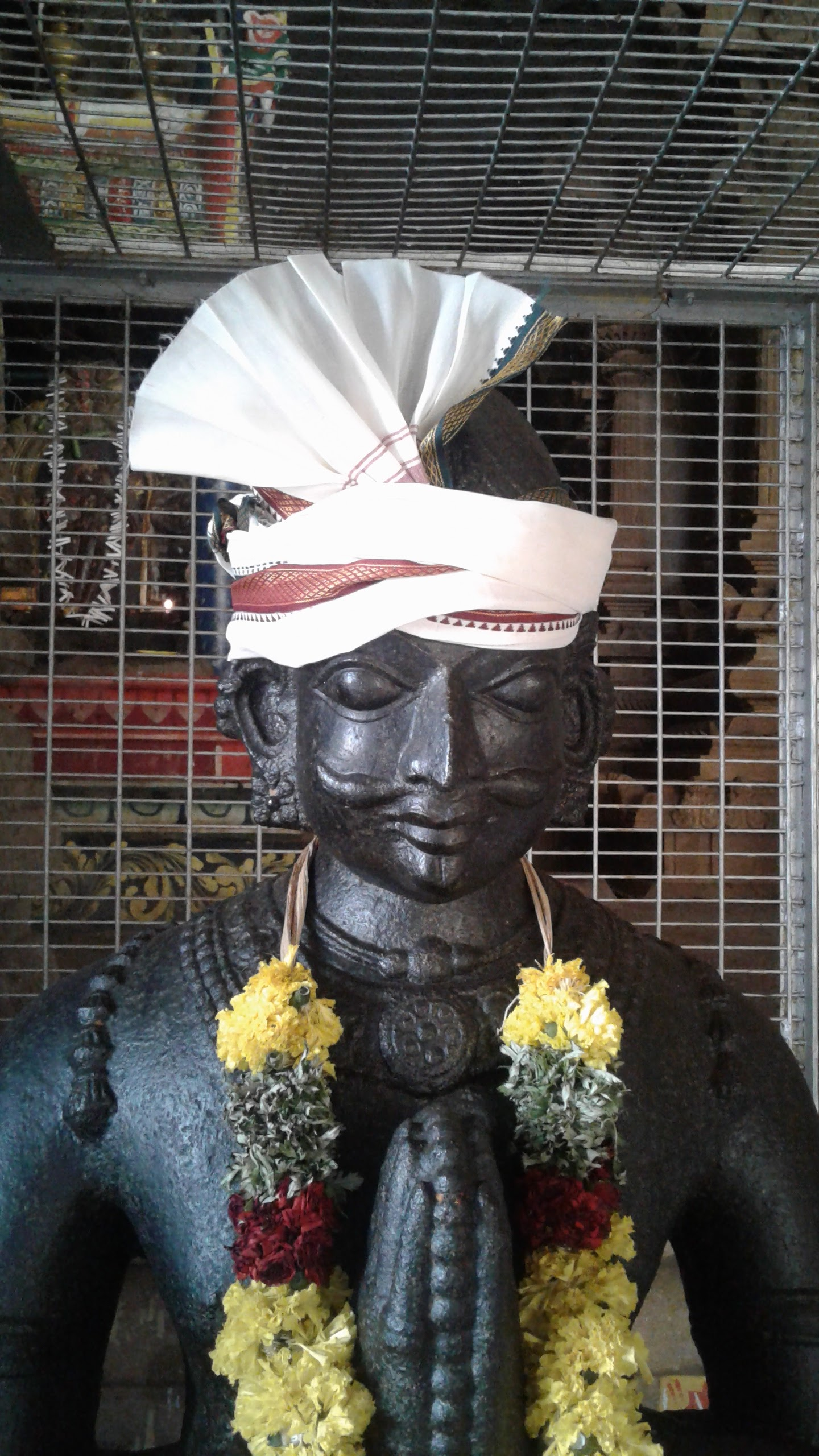
Periya Marudhu and Chinna Marudhu sculptures inside of Kalaiyar Kovil, Sivagangai District.

The Marudhu Pandiyars (Periya Marudhu and Chinna Marudhu) were de facto rulers of Sivagangai, Tamil Nadu, India, towards the end of the 18th century. They were known for fighting against the East India Company. They were finally executed by the EIC after being captured by them .

== Childhood ==
Periya and Chinna Marudhu, sons of Mookiah Palaniappan Servai was native of Mukkulam, near Narikudi which was 18 miles away from Aruppukottai. Their mother Anandhayee alias Ponnathal was native of Pudhupatti near Sivagangai. Both the brothers were born at Mukkulam in the year 1748 and 1753 respectively. The first son was named as Vellai Marudhu, alias Periya Marudhu, and the second son as Chinna Marudhu.

== Rebellion ==
In 1772, British East India company had killed Muthuvaduganatha Thevar over his refusal to pay taxes. However Marudhu Pandiyar and Queen Velunachiyar escaped, and stayed with Gopala Nayak in Dindigul Fort for 8 years. After this time, an alliance of kingdoms led by the Pandiyar attacked Sivagangai and retook it in 1789. Both Maruthu Pandiyar were given high positions in the kingdom.

They were good at aerodynamics and craftsmanship and is said to have invented the Valari, a variant of the boomerang.

== Death ==
The Marudhu Pandiyars, planned to wage war against East India Company in India. They gave protection to Oomaithurai Kumaraswamy who was temporarily seeking refuge from the chaos of war. They along with the war leader, Sivagangai and many of their family members, were captured at Cholapuram and were killed at Tiruppattur. The Marudhu Brothers were hanged to death at the fort of Tirupputhur, which is now Sivaganga district, Tamil Nadu, on 24 October 1801. The Memorial Square of Maruthu Pandiyars is located at Kalaiyarkoil.

== Honour ==
Maruthu Brothers are good in aerodynamics and invented many variants of spears and Valari. They also founded guerilla war tactic in India during the early stages of colonization.

- Till 1997, Tamilnadu State Transport Corporation was named as Marudhupandiyar Transport Corporation for Karaikudi region operated buses.
- A commemorative postage stamp of Marudhu pandyars was released in October 2004.
- on December 15, 2007 Dr. Kalaignar M. Karunanithi, that day CM of Tamilnadu opened the 10 feet Bronze Sculpture of Marudhu pandyars holding the swords on a horse facing Madurai Mariamman Theppakulam
- Every year, Maruthu Pandiyars Guru Poojai was greatly celebrated at their Memorial in Kalaiyarkoil in October 27. Its also a Public holiday only in Sivaganga district.

Local Tamilians also worship them and there is a temple dedicated and located at Batu Dua Mariamman Temple, Sungai Petani, Kedah state at Malaysia.

A film called Sivagangai Seemai was made about their lives in 1959 .

== See also ==
- Indian independence activist
- Agamudayar
- Mamannargal .maruthupandiargal
- Kalayar Kovil
- Maruthupandiar varalaru Tamil
- Maveeran Oomaithurai Nayakar
- Rani Velu Nachiar
- Maveeran Veerapandiya Kattabomma Nayakar
