= Lagobolon =

Ancient Greek hunting and herding stick

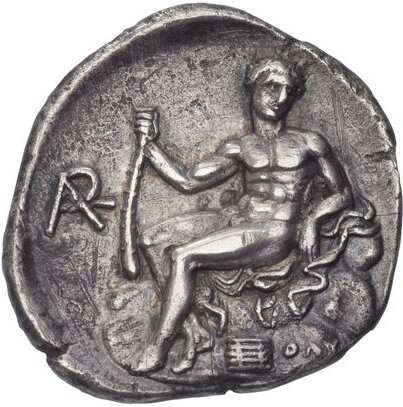
Pan holding a lagobolon in his right hand and resting his left elbow on the rock.

A lagobolon (Ancient Greek: λαγωβόλον or λαγωοβόλον) is a weapon which was used in Ancient Greece for hunting hares or birds.

== Description ==
In ancient depictions the lagobolon is usually a short staff or stick with a bend in it, suitable for throwing, similar to a boomerang. It is described as being used for hunting as well as herding.

According to scholar John Anderson, the lagobolon originated in Magna Graecia, the Greek-speaking region of southern Italy.

== Symbolism ==
According to Dionysius of Halicarnassus, a lagobola was the symbol of the founding of Rome. He says that Romulus used a lagobola to mark out the areas for taking omens before the founding of the city.

== Gallery ==
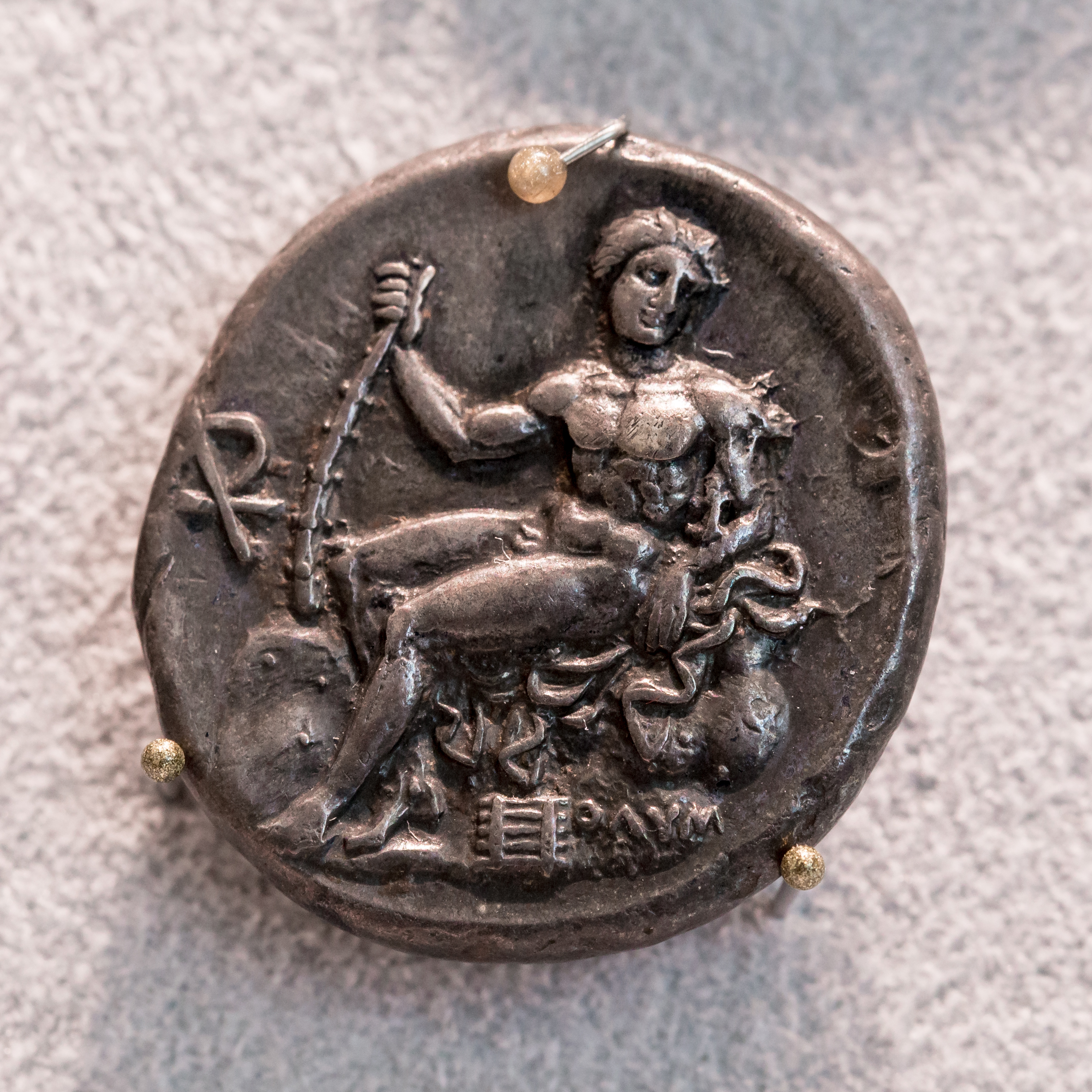
A coin depicting Pan bearing a lagobolon

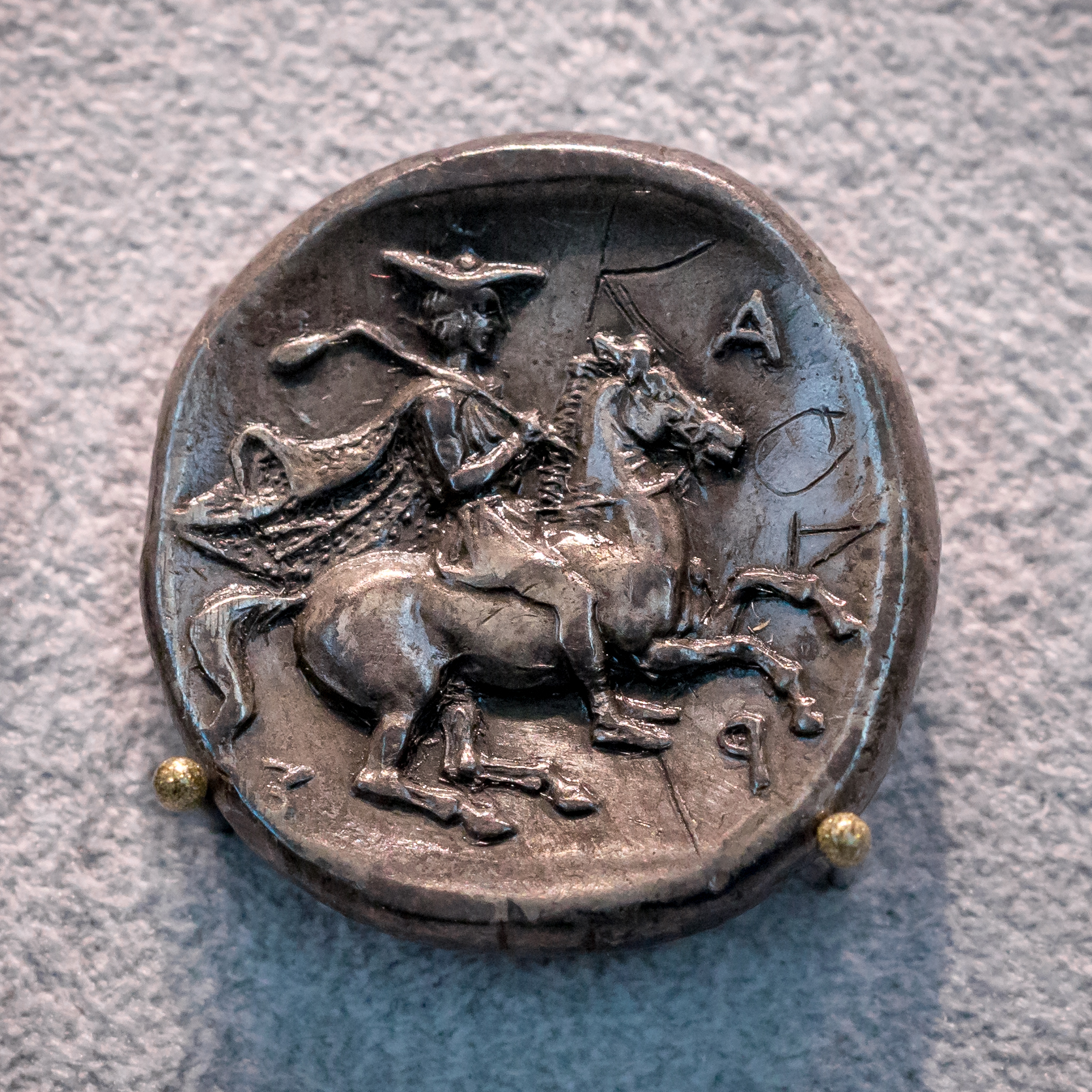
A horseman with lagobolon

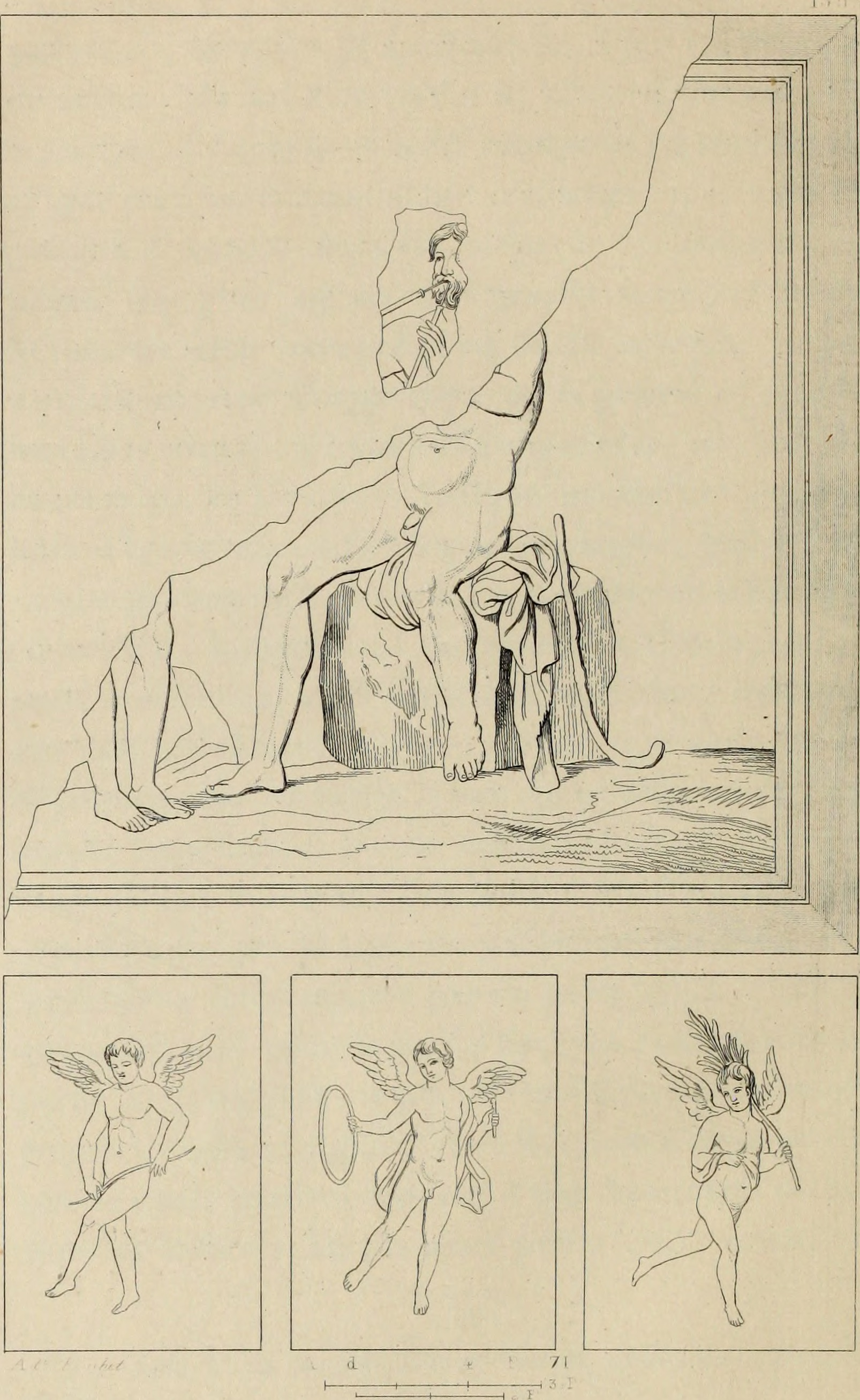
A drawing depicting a lagobolon next to a man

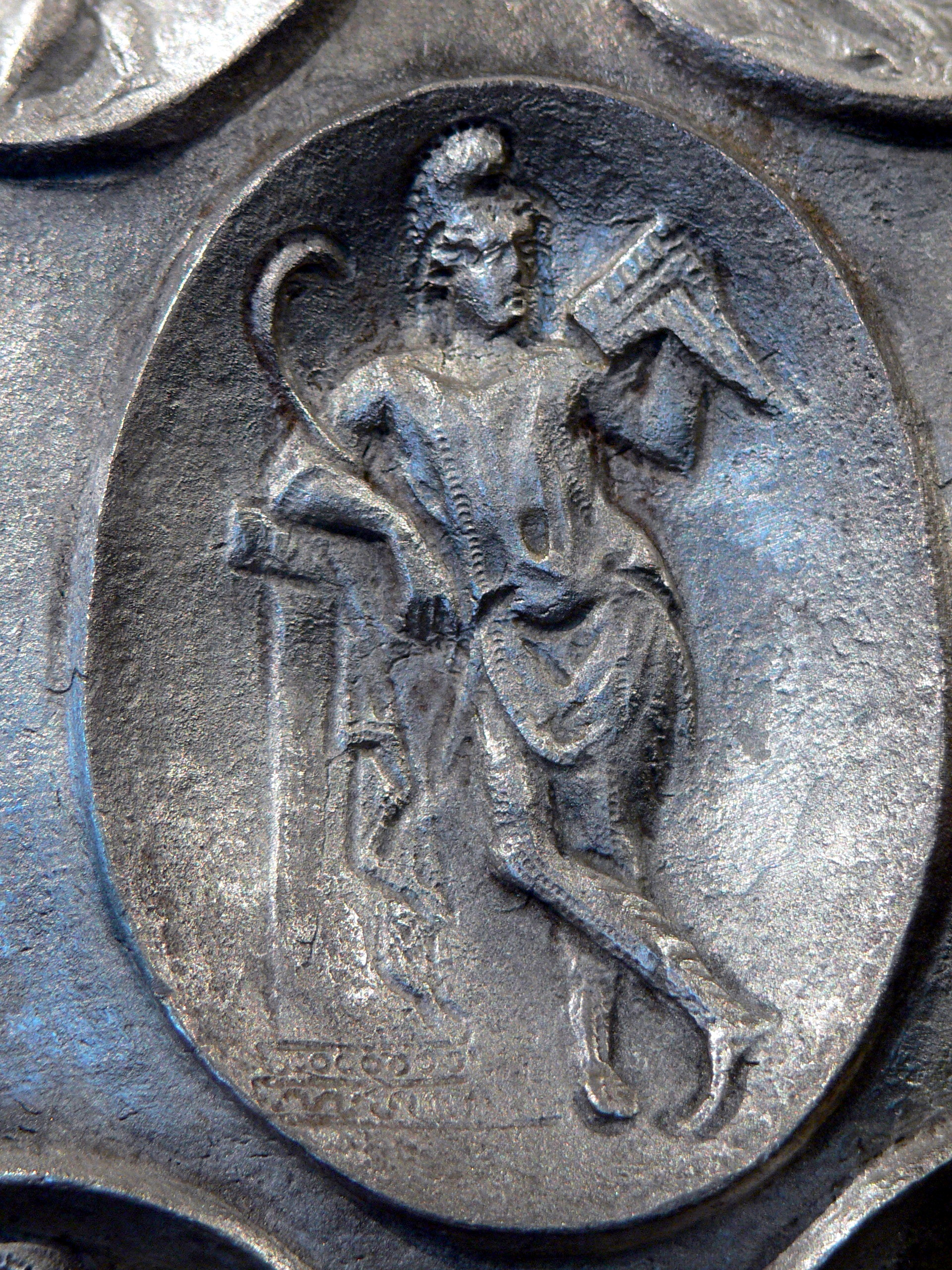
A medallion depicting a lagobolon

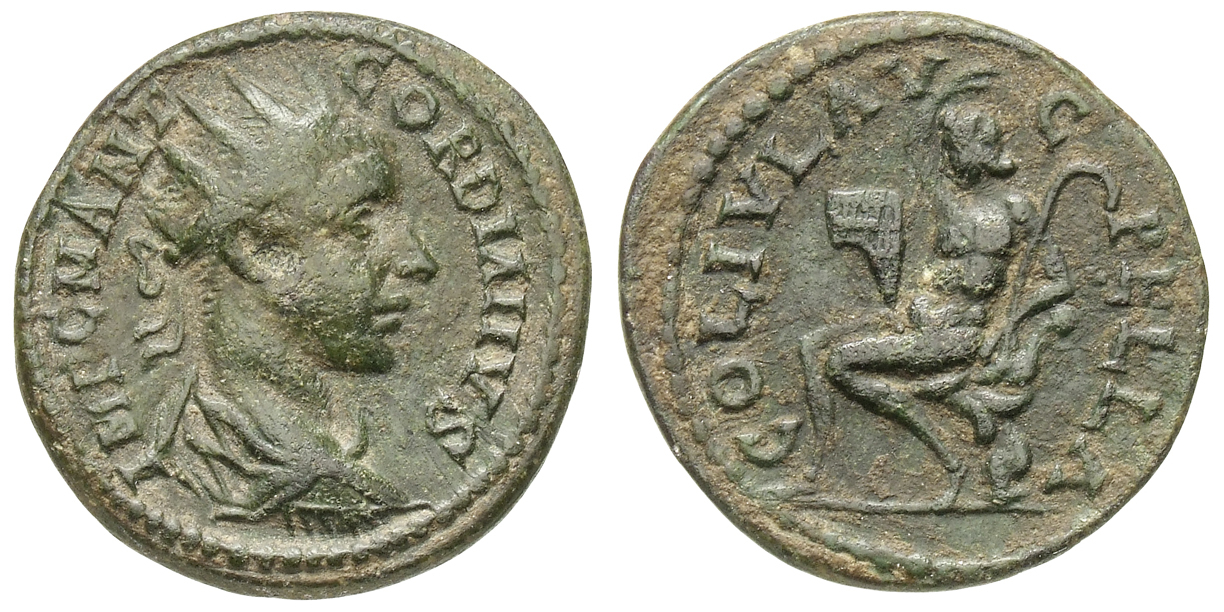
Coing depicting a lagobolon

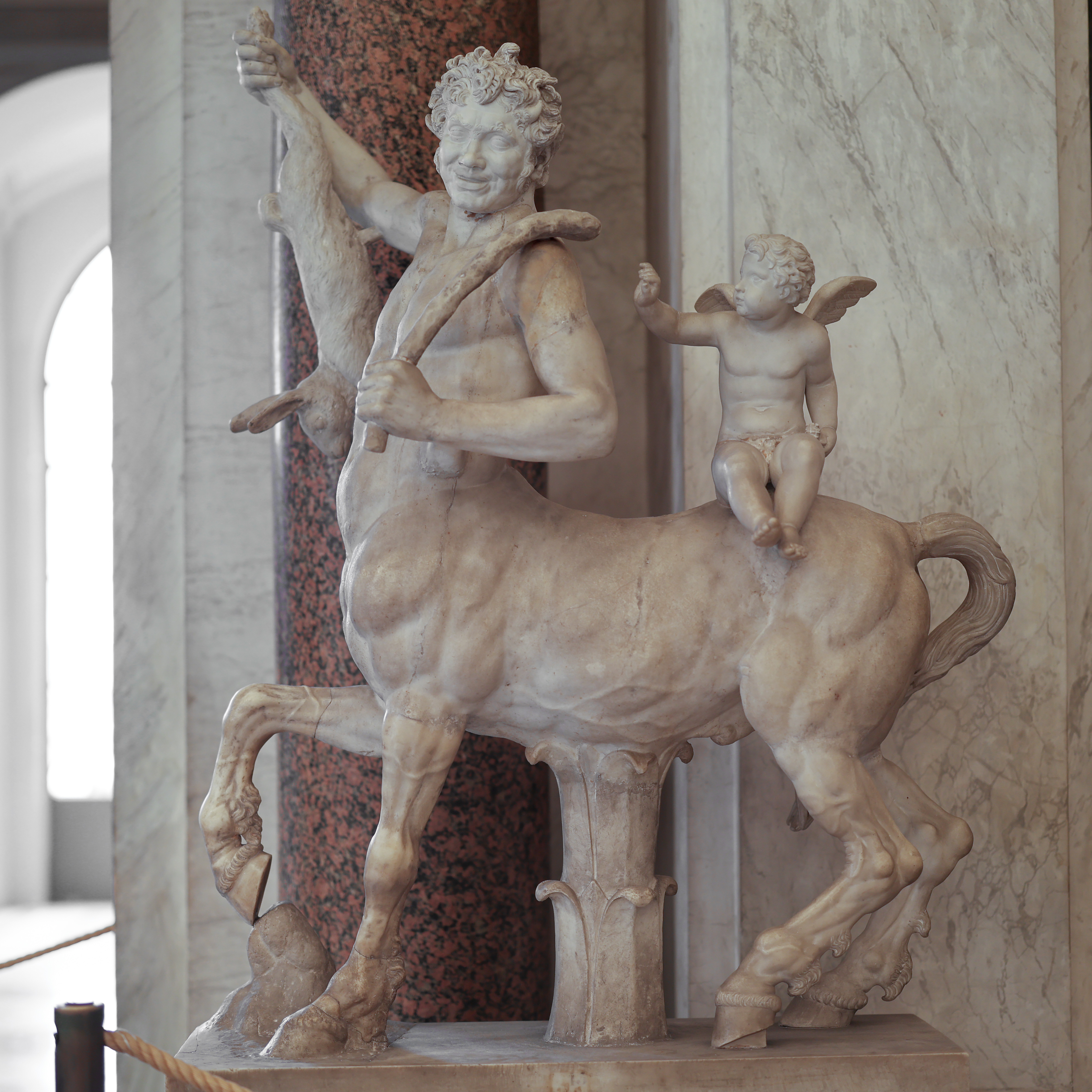
Centaur with a lagobolon
