= Muthu Vaduganatha Periyavudaya Thevar =

Indian Freedom Fighter And King Of Sivagangai Tamilnadu

Muthu Vadu Periyavudaya Thevar was the second king of the Sivagangai Estate which is also known "Lesser Maravar Kingdom". He ruled from 1750 to 1772.

== Childhood ==
Muthuvadukanatha Thevar son of Vijaya Raghunatha Sasivarna Periyavudaya Thevar was native of Sivagangai. His mother Akilandeshwari Nachiyar a was native of Ramnad Estate.
