= Kiladhari =

- Village
- Country: India
- State: Tamil Nadu
- District: Sivaganga
- Taluk: Tiruppuvanam

Languages
  - Official: Tamil
- Time zone: UTC+5:30 (IST)
- PIN: 630562
- Post Office: Sivaganga Collectorate

Kiladhari is a village in Tiruppuvanam taluk in Sivaganga district of Tamil Nadu state, India.

== Geography ==
It is located 20 km west of the district headquarters Sivaganga, 15 km from Tiruppuvanam and 476 km from the state capital Chennai. Nearby villages include Thamarakki (north) (6 km), Thamarakki (south) (6 km), Kumarapatti (8 km), Mudikandam (9 km) and Padamathur (9 km).

Kiladhari is surrounded by Melur taluk to the North, Sivaganga taluk to the East, Madurai West Taluk to the west and Madurai East Taluk to the west.

Thirupuvanam, Sivaganga, Madurai and Natham are the nearest cities to Kiladhari.

This place is situated along the border of the Sivaganga District and Madurai District.

== Description ==
Kiladhari is one of the villages among the four Magaanam, along with Thamarakki, the motherland, and other villages like Arasanoor and Iluppakkudi. Kiladhari has an abundance of agricultural lands, comprising 9 Kanmays and 80 Yendhals.

The village is home to two major temples: Azhiyanachi Amman Temple and Nerudamadai Ayyanar Swamy Temple. These temples host annual festivals, showcasing the village's rich cultural heritage.

== Transport ==
There are no railway stations within Kiladhari and the nearest station, Madurai Junction railway station, is 27 km away. Buses run from Mattuthavani Bus Terminus to Kilathari.

== Education ==
Nearby colleges:

- K.L.N College of Engineering 11 km
- Vickram College of Engineering
- RASS Academy College of Nursing
- VIKRAM Teacher Training College

Schools:

- P.U.mid.school Kiladhari
