= Alangudi =

Alangudi may refer to:

== Places in Tamil Nadu, India ==
- Alangudi, Nagapattinam, a village in Nagapattinam district
- Alangudi, Nannilam, a village in Tiruvarur district
- Alangudi, Papanasam taluk, a village in Thanjavur district
- Alangudi, Pudukkottai, a town in Pudukkottai district
  - Alangudi Assembly constituency, a state assembly constituency
  - Alangudi taluk, a taluk in Pudukkottai district
- Alangudi (Sivaganga), a village in Sivaganga district
- Alangudi, Valangaiman, in Tiruvarur district, site of the Apatsahayesvarar Temple, Alangudi

== People ==
- Alangudi Somu (1932−1997), Indian Tamil film lyricist
- Alangudi Vanganar, Tamil poet of the Sangam period
