= Sivapuripatti =

- Neighbourhood
- Country: India
- State: Tamil Nadu
- District: Sivaganga

Languages
  - Official: Tamil, English
  - Speech: Tamil, English
- Time zone: UTC+5:30 (IST)
- Telephone code: +914577******
- Other Neighbourhoods: Singampunari

Sivapuripatti is a small village located in Sivagangai District of Tamil Nadu, India. The nearest town to this village is Singampunari. It is located at a distance of 60 km from the city of Madurai in South India. Coconut rope production is one of main occupation here. STD code of this location is 4577.

== Importance of Sivapuripatti ==
One of the highlights of this village is the ancient "Syambulingeswarar temple". We could find a lot of lithographic scripts on the walls of the temple. The idol of Shiva in this shrine is believed to be a Swayambhu (self originated). Shiva is an important deity for the Hindu mythology, is worshipped from times immemorial, and is still popular as ever. In this shrine, apart from Shiva, deities of Lord Vinayaka, Lord Muruga, Chandikeshwarar and Navagraha are housed. Also there is a separate temple for Amman (Goddess) adjacent to it, with a pond in front. A karuppar idol is located in between these 2 temples.

== Climate ==
Sivapuripatti experiences a very dry and hot climate with low degree of humidity. Normally, the temperature varies from 22 to 39 degree Celsius.

== Language ==
Tamil is spoken, predominantly, in and around Sivapuripatti.

== Transport ==
Sivapuripatti is well-connected by road.

== Air ==
Madurai airport is around 60 km from Sivapuripatti and serves many of the regional airlines in India. People could get there via Chennai International Airport that has frequent services to Madurai. From the Madurai airport, taxi could be hired to reach this place.

== Train ==
Madurai junction has direct connection to Mumbai, Chennai and many other important towns in India. From the railway station, a taxi could be hired to reach this place.
