= Kattuthalaivasal =

Area in Tamil Nadu, India karaikudi

- Area
- Location in Tamil Nadu, India Kattuthalaivasal (India)
- Coordinates: 10.07°N 78.78°E
- Country: India
- State: Tamil Nadu
- District: Sivaganga
- Elevation: 82 m (269 ft)

Population (2001)
  - Total: 6,000

Languages
  - Official: Tamil
- Time zone: UTC+5:30 (IST)
- PIN: 630001

Kattuthalaivasal is located in Karaikudi municipality in the Sivaganga District in the Indian state of Tamil Nadu. This area comprises Ward 15, Ward 16 and Ward 10. The majority of the people Kattuthalaivasal are Muslims.

Jamia Masjid, recently renovated in 2005, is an important landmark in Kattuthalaivasal.

The Kattuthalivasal area gained momentum when the area acquired a lot of new facilities, particularly a new bus stand.

== Demographics ==
As of 2001 an Indian census showed that Kattuthalaivasal had a population of 6,000. Males and females are roughly even in numbers and the majority of the population are Muslims.

== Geography ==
Kattuthalaivasal is one of the key areas in Karaikudi. Kattuthalaivasal's postal pincode is 630001 and dialing code is 91-4565. It is very near to Sekkalai Road, which is located north-east of Karaikudi.

== Mosques ==
Jamia Mosque Kattuthalaivasal mosque is located at the centre of the Karaikudi city. It is one of the oldest mosques in Karaikudi. This mosque was renovated in 2005. Former Indian President Abdul Kalam delivered his speech on this mosque.

- Imam of the Mosque =Moulana Moulavi Al-hafil A.Mohamed Badhrudeen Yusufi.
- Head of the Mosque = Mr. ADAMS
- Treasurer = ACR. Abdul Wahab ( Ricemill Owner)
- Secretary = Shahul Hameed M.C (Maligai Store)
- Asst. Secretary = M. Abdul Hameed (Nagoor Andavar Cycle Service / Chennai Steel Corporation)

== Miscellaneous ==
In Kattuthalaivasal:

- Counsilor for Ward 15 = Shahul Hameed M.C
- Counsilor for Ward 16 = Roja begum sahul hameed M.C
- Counsilor for Ward 10 = Tamilan Abubackar M.C
