= Michael Patnam =

Michael Pattanam Chinna Romapuri
- Village
- Nickname: St. Michael's Parish
- Location in Tamil Nadu, India
- Coordinates: 9.802383°N 78.382827°E
- Country: India
- State: Tamil Nadu
- District: Sivaganga
- Elevation: 70 m (230 ft)

Population (2009)
  - Total: 550 Approx

Languages
  - Official: Tamil
- Time zone: UTC+5:30 (IST)
- PIN: 630 565
- Telephone code: 914575 XX
- Vehicle registration: TN 63

Michael Patnam is a small village which is a village panchayat in Sivaganga district, Tamil Nadu, India. An important landmark is St Michael's Church which is the parish church. The patron of this church is St. Michael, whose feast day will be celebrated on the second Saturday in the month of May as 'Archangel's Feast' every year

== Geography ==
Michael Patnam is located at .[1] It has an average elevation of 700 metres (2290 feet).

== History ==
Michael Patnam is close to Madurai (40 km). The two routes to the village are Sivagangai or Ramnad highway and this village sits in the middle of these highways, 35 km from Madurai.

This Parish was erected in 1916. In the month of May 2016, on 27th, 28th and 29th the centenary celebration of the erection of the parish will be celebrated grandly. On the first day the former parish priests and sisters are invited and honoured. On the second day the Priests and Religious people of the soil are invited and honoured. On the third day all the people in and around are invited and honoured in the presence of the Bishop of Sivagangai.

== Agriculture ==
A vast majority of the workforce is dependent on agriculture (72.8% approx.). The principal crop of Michael Patnam village is Rice and Sugarcane. Currently due to the shortage of water and rain, hardly any cultivation seem to be happening.

== Schools ==
- RC Boy's High School, Michael Patnam
- St.Mary's High School, Michael Patnam

== Temples/Churches ==
- St. Michael's Church
- St.Velankanni's Grotto

== Demographics ==
As of 2001 India census, Michael Patnam had a population of 550 approx. Males constitute 45% of the population and females 45%. In Michael Patnam, 10% of the population is under 6 years of age.
