= Madapuram =

Neighbourhood in Sivaganga district, Tamil Nadu, India

- Interactive map of Madapuram
- Coordinates: 9.828511892926517°N 78.26627130362988°E

Madurapuram is a small village in India that lies on the banks of the Vaigai River and on the National Highway 49 that connects Madurai with Rameshwaram. The village is situated 18 kilometres (11 mi) from Madurai. Though Madapuram is near Madurai it is within Sivagangai district. The famous Madurapuram Badhrakali amman and ayyanar temple is situated at this place. Today this temple is managed by HR & CE ministry of Government of Tamil Nadu.

Madurapuram kali is believed to be the Kaval deivams of Madurai Pandyan king. The temple has no roof. Madapuram kali is very famous here she stands with no roof and about 12 feet (3.7 m) high. Ammavasya days will be very crowded with people pray with lemon mala and archani.

The Rajagopuram (the tower) of Bathirakaliamman temple is of five tiers. The Goddess amman idol is 13 feet (4.0 m) high and is guarded on both sides by two Boothas (demons). A horse statue 30 feet (9.1 m) high stands raising its legs over this idol.

Bathirakaliamman holds a trident and has a crown of fire. People consider the temple to be a court of justice. It is common that at a small platform outside the temple people seek justice from the Goddess. They come in wet clothes, state their complaint and cut a coin and put it on a sacred place "Pattyakkal" installed here. They believe that by doing this they receive justice and the person against whom the complaint is lodged will be punished appropriately by the Goddess.

The Thala virutcham is a Neem tree. The temple has two theerthams, namely Brahmma Gundam and Manikarni theertham. The temple is open from 6.00 a.m. until 8.00 p.m.

== History ==
2300 years ago, this place was surrounded by thick thorn forest. During that period, Trimurti along with Goddess Gowri went for hunting. Lord Shiva asked Parvathy not to come along with them. As Parvathy doesn't wished to stay alone, Lord Shiva created a child named "Ayyanar" to accompany her. She requested Lord Shiva to make this place as a holy one and Lord shiva accepted her wish and made this place holy by informing that taking bath in Vaigai river within 3 km from this place is spiritually equivalent to taking bath in Kasi, the holy water.

Goddess Parvathy stayed here as KALI and When a devotee asked a wish to her, she ordered him to provide a horse-shaped shadow for her standing posture. Lifting his two legs, he provided shadow and from that day onwards, Goddess Kali blessed the devotees in this form.

There is another ancient history for this temple. Once upon a time the city Madurai was surrounded by flood. As Goddess Meenakshi asked to show the boundary of Madurai, Lord Adishesha showed the boundary by covering the area with its head and tail and this place was known as Padapuram (Padam-Face of the snake and Puram-Back of the snake) and in later days, it became Madapuram.

== Transportation ==
By road:The temple is situated at 18 km away from Madurai on the way to Rameswaram. Daily buses are available from Madurai Periyar bus stand to this temple. Buses from Periyar Bus stand to Madapuram, Enadhi, Pappakudi, Kanakkankudi and Kannaarippu will pass through this temple. People can reach Thirupuvanam from the Madurai Matutthavani Bus stand and should travel 2 km to reach this temple. Auto share facility is also available.

By train:The nearest railway station is Thirupuvanam station and the temple is located 2 km away from this railway station. Only passenger trains will stop at this station. The main railway junction is Madurai Junction situated 18 km from the temple.

By air:The nearest airport is Madurai Airport(IXM) which is 30 km away from the temple. Air connectivity is available from Chennai, Mumbai, Delhi, Hyderabad, and Vijayawada. International connectivity is available to Sri Lanka and Dubai. Connectivity to Singapore is expected soon.

== Places near Madapuram ==
Viraganoor dam is situated 12 km from Madapuram. This dam is built across the river Vaigai. A small park is also being maintained near the dam.

Thirupuvanam is situated just 1 km from Madapuram. The temple is one of 275 Siva Devera sthalams. The Main Deity is Poornanadhar Goddess Soundra Nayaki in separate sanctum. Sthala Vruksham is Jack Fruit. Teertham is Mnikarnigai River and Vaigi River. Dharmayagnan wanted to mix his father’s ash in Sethuk karai. As he was proceeding he happened to cross this place where the ashes turned to flowers. This place is considered equal to Kasi. Brahma, Thirumal, Surya, Naradha, Thirumagal, and Nala Maharaja worshipped Lord Siva of this place. Sambandhar, Thirunavukkarasar, and Sundarar sang hymns on Siva of this place.

Before the 7th century AD in Tamil Nadu, Jainism and Buddhism were the dominant religions. During that period the four great Saivaite Quartet restores the pristine glory of Saivism. They traveled far and wide in the Pandya kingdom extolling and singing the glory of God. There are 14 Shrines where their songs are available. These 14 Shrines in the Pandiya Kingdom are known as Pandi-14. Amongst the 14 Shrines, Madurai, the Capital of the Pandiya Kingdom is the most ancient. But the city was ravaged due to the war of Lord Indra, the curse of Kannagi, which consumed Madurai, and the spate in the river Vaigai was brought back to life again and again but the only Shrine which maintains its ancient glory is Thirupuvanam. It is said that Goddess Parvati, to expiate from her sin, sat under the Parijatha Tree for Penance.

The glories of the Thirupuvanam are narrated in Brahma-vaivarta puranam (Sanskrit). And it was translated in the Tamil Language and named as "Thirupuvana Puranam" by Kandasamy Pulavar.

More over the glories of Thirupuvanam are narrated in 3 episodes in Thiruvillaiyadar Puranam of Paranjothi Munivar.
