= Kallal, Tamil Nadu =

Kallal
- Village
- Location in Tamil Nadu, India
- Coordinates: 9.98°N 78.66°E
- Country: India
- State: Tamil Nadu
- District: Sivaganga
- Elevation: 85 m (279 ft)

Population (2009)
  - Total: 7,100

Languages
  - Official: Tamil
- Time zone: UTC+5:30 (IST)
- Vehicle registration: TN63 TN-
- Nearest city: Karaikudi

Kallal is a village in Sivaganga District of Tamil Nadu in India. Kallal block Panchayat is one of the 12 block Panchayat coming under Sivaganga District administration of Tamil Nadu state in India. Kallal is well connected by both Road transport and Rail network. Both state owned TNSTC and Private Omni Bus services are operated from Kallal to different parts of Tamil Nadu state.

== Geography ==
Kallal is located at 9.98°N 78.66°E. The mean elevation is 85 metres.

== Education ==
There are three higher secondary schools:

- Shanti Rani Matric Higher Secondary School
- Britto Higher Secondary School
- Murugappa Higher Secondary School
