= Velangudi, Sivaganga =

Community in Tamil Nadu, India

- village
- Location in Tamil Nadu, India Velangudi, Sivaganga (India)
- Coordinates: 10.11920163614964°N 78.79147276649849°E
- Country: India
- State: Tamil Nadu
- District: Sivaganga

Languages
  - Official: Tamil
- Time zone: UTC+5:30 (IST)

Velangudi (Sivagangai) is a gram panchayat located in Tirupattur block of Sivaganga district in the Indian state of Tamil Nadu. The village is a part of the Tirupattur Legislative Assembly constituency and the Sivaganga Lok Sabha constituency, which is a suburb of Karaikudi. The village has a total of 7 Panchayat Assembly constituencies. 7 Panchayat members are elected from these constituencies. As of the 2011 Census of India, the village had a population of 3,207. There were 1,683 females and 1,524 males. PIN Code is 630106.
