= Chettinad Airport =

Abandoned airport in Tamil Nadu, India

Chettinad Airport, also known as the Karaikudi Kanadukathan Airport, is an abandoned airport near Karaikudi. Chettinad Airport is named for its location in the Chettinad region. The land surrounding the airstrip is now barren, but the runway of this airstrip is still in working condition with no damage. It spans approximately 2000 meter in length and 1500 width. It looks like Latin Cross from the air. It has 2 runways which is left undamaged till date.

The peoples of Chettinad pioneered India's Flying Club. Chettinad Airstrip Boasted one of the India's first Flying Club in 1930's itself. This airport served as a Primary Hub airport of Jupiter Airlines around 1953 which was operated by Alagappa Chettiar at that time, later the airline company is closed and so the airport left in disuse. The airstrip was used by the British Government (United Kingdom) as an airbase during World War II. Fighter planes from Royal Air force would land at this airstrip to refuel and reload the bombs and also there was a helipad at that airbase. It housed DC3, the Hawker Hurricanes and the spitfires at that time.

Nearest functioning airport to karaikudi is Madurai International airport and Tiruchirapalli international airport. But both airports are located at a distance of approximately 100 km (by Road) from this town.

The Government of India plans to construct a new airport at Chettinad under the UDAN scheme. Once opened, this airport serves the districts of Sivagangai, Pudukkottai and Ramanathapuram. And also serves many religious cultural places present around this area. Currently this land is being owned and maintained by the Tamil Nadu Animal Husbandry Department.

As of September 2025, despite the interest of Central Government of India, Government of Tamil Nadu is trying to bring a Pilot Training School (club) at Chettinad Airstrip. This flying club was named as Azhagappa Flying club and functional till 1950's.

As of 2025, Tamil Nadu government under TIDCO is also developing testing, training centre for drones beyond visual area of sight at Chettinad airstrip which is first of its kind in India.

== Importance of this airport ==
Tourist, religious and cultural places near this airport:

Kalayarkovil

Thirumayam

Pillaiyarpatti

Kundrakudi

Thondi

Thiruutirakosamangai

Devipattinam

Rameswaram

Karaikudi

Vettangudi

Thirukostiyur

Important towns near this airport:

Karaikudi

Sivagangai

Pudukkottai

Ramanathapuram

Tirupathur

Aranthangi

Thirumayam

Devakottai

Ponamaravathi

Thondi

Thiruvadanai

Paramakudi

Importance of this airport:

The INS Parundu airbase serves for Indian navy which strategically locates very close to ceylon which causes several inabilities of Indian navy to cooperate with commercial airline and this airbase has a runway length of just 920 Meters which is not capable of handling medium and larger flights. It has the capability to handle just 20 seater airplanes in its runway. Moreover, the runway of this airbase is sandwiched between Highway Road(Madurai Rameswaram Highway) and Railway Track(Manamadurai - Rameswaram branch line) which makes this airbase unfit for future expansion. So it is not possible to locate an airport at INS Parundu. Instead karaikudi airstrip which is few kilometers away from INS Parundu airbase can be the best option for making an airport because it has 2 runways spans 2000 Meters and 1500 Metres with no constructed buildings and no upcoming projects around it.

== Incidents ==
On November 13, 2025, a Single Engined cessna aircraft was met with an accident due to failure of the engine which was conducting training for pilots in the scheduled route between Salem - Karaikudi - Salem sector. The flight partially crash landed on the Karaikudi Trichy Highway with no casualties.
