= Sembanur =

Village in Tamil Nadu, India

- Village
- Location in Tamil Nadu, India
- Coordinates: 10.00°N 78.631°E
- Country: India
- State: Tamil Nadu
- District: Sivaganga

Population (2011)
  - Total: 717

Languages
  - Official: Tamil
- Time zone: UTC+5:30 (IST)

Sembanur (or Sembanoor) is a village located in the Sivaganga District of Tamil Nadu in India.
