= Muraiyur =

Coordinates: 10.147001°N 78.501692°E

Muraiyur is a village in the Taluk of Singampunari in the district of Sivaganga in the Indian state of Tamil Nadu.

Distance from other locations:

- 9.566 kilometres (5.944 mi) from the Taluk's main town of Singampunari
- 33.15 kilometres (20.60 mi) from the district's main city of Sivaganga
- 375 kilometres (233 mi) from the state capital of Chennai.
