= Sadurvedamangalam =

Cāturvatamaṅkalam transcription(s)
- Nickname: S V Mangalam
- Interactive map of Sadurvedamangalam
- Coordinates: 10.166°N 78.472°E
- Village: Silaneerpatti
- Village: Vadathipatti

Population
  - Total: 4,000

Sadur Veda Mangalam is a village in Singampunari Taluk, Sivaganga district, Tamil Nadu, India, 400 kilometers from the state capital of Chennai.

== Information ==
The village has a population of 4000. It also has many historic temples. In addition, a village is a connecting place between Madurai, Dindigul, Pazhani to Karaikudi and Rameswaram. It includes two more remote villages: Silaneerpatti, and Vadathipatti. S.V Mangalam has a circle level police station, VAO, Post Office, and Public Distribution Center such as a Ration Shop The postal code of the village is 630501.

=== Historic Temples ===
S.V. Mangalam is home to the "Aathmanayaki-Ruthrakodiswarar" and this is the one and only temple for this god in Asia; this temple was constructed in the 10th century. The village also has the Iyyanar Temple, Amman Temple, Yoga Narasingapperumal temple and Vinayagar Temple.

== Education and business ==
Most of the population of S.V. Mangalam is an educated village of Tamil Nadu. Most of the men and few of the women are working in government organizations, as well as government schools.

The main business from the village is the cultivation of coconuts, rice, and groundnuts. The local language in the village is Tamil.
