= Tiruppuvanam taluk =

Tiruppuvanam taluk is a taluk in Sivaganga district of the Indian state of Tamil Nadu. The headquarters of the taluk is the town of Thirupuvanam, Sivaganga.

Keezhadi village comes under Thiruppuvanam Taluk under the Thiruppuvanam Block. This taluk is carved out from Manamadurai taluk. This taluk consist of 3 firkas namely Thiruppuvanam, Thiruppachethi (Thirupachi) and Konthagai
