= Piranmalai Kodunkundreeswar Temple =

Piranmalai
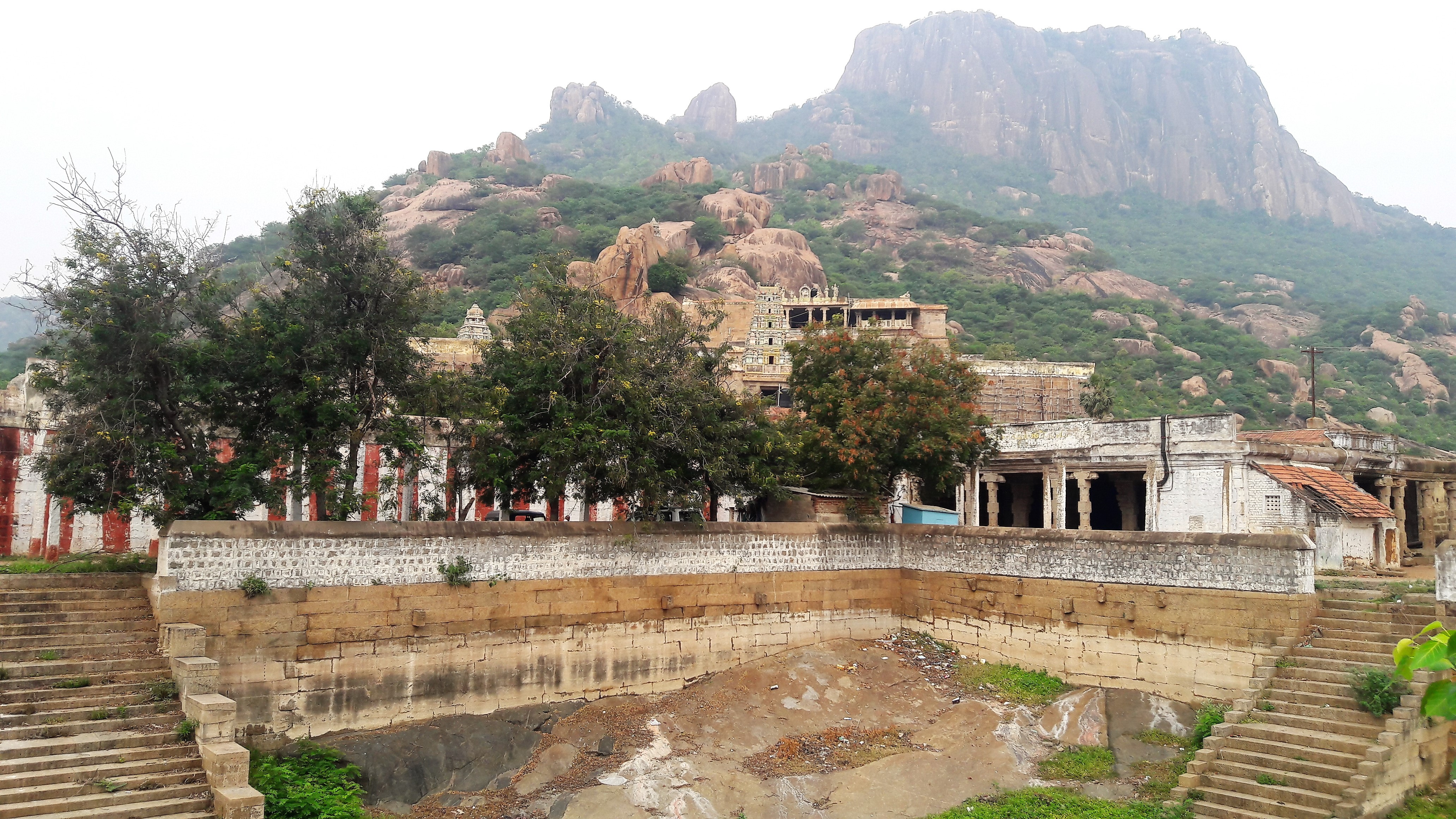

- Location in Tamil Nadu

Religion
- Affiliation: Hinduism
- District: Sivaganga
- Deity: Kodunkundranathar(Shiva), Kuyilamritanayaki(Parvathi)
- Festivals: GrandBrahmotsavam & Chittirai Thiruvila

Location
- Location: Tamil Nadu, India
- State: Tamil Nadu
- Country: India
- Coordinates: 10°14′19″N 78°26′13″E

Architecture
- Type: Dravidian architecture
- Elevation: 609.6 m (2,000 ft)

Piranmalai Kodunkundreeswar Temple is a Hindu temple situated at Piranmalai, a hilly village located in Singampunari Taluk in Sivagangai District, Tamil Nadu State, India. Kodunkundreeswar and Bhairavar temples are located in this village.

Piranmalai is a fortified hill at an elevation of over 2,000 feet. This is a last outcrop of the Eastern Ghats, with a Bhairavar temple and five peedas in the rocks of the hill called the Pandava Therthams, is also sacred to the Muslims with a dargah of Waliullah Sheikh Abdullah Shaheb on its peak. At the foot hill, there are traces of a moat and Fort Marudhu, which was pulled down in early 19th century.

One of the seven Vallals, Paari ruled this area. The barren hill is believed to have been covered with dense jungle in the days of Maruthupandiar's rule from late 17th century to 1801. It was part of a large jungle that extended from the Eastern Ghats to the Palk Straits. This is a vast hill temple reached by a flight of steps in the Pandya Kingdom. The Marudu brothers of Sivagangai associated with Kalayar Kovil have made several contributions to this temple. The hilly village includes five areas (Piranmalai Main, Mathagupatti, Pudupatti, Pappapatti, Adiyarkulam).

== Mythology ==
Piranmalai is said to have been ruled by Paari Vallal. Piraanmalai is said to be a block of Mount Meru, which got blown off during a fierce tussle between the serpent king Aadiseshan and the wind God Vaayu(as in Tiruchengode). Since this hill is in the form of a Sivalingam, it is also called Prachandragiri and Katoragiri. Bhrama, Saraswati, Subramanya and Nandi are believed to have worshipped Shiva here. Shiva is believed to have revealed a vision of his marriage with Parvati to Agasthya Muni here. Lord Shiva in this hill temple is known as Mangaibaagar(also called MangaiNayagar) and Goddess Parvati is known as Thenammal. In this hill, there is a natural stone carving that depicts the marriage of Lord Shiva and Goddess Parvati . It shows Lord Mangaibaagar is holding hands with Goddess Thenammal.

== Architecture ==
The bus service to Ponnamaravathi from Madurai Anna bus stand goes via this village Piranmalai. There are also several bus service available from singampunari which was 7 km away from here. This temple is located 20 km from Tiruppathur. This is vast complex covering an area of about 30 acres (120,000 m^{2}), with three prakarams (outer courtyard), an attractive Rajagopuram and five beautiful vimanams. This is a three tier temple, each tier representing the states of Pathala (nether world), Bhūmi (Earth), Antariksham (Space/Sky) with Swargam (heaven). Lord Shiva blesses the devotees in the form of Kodunkundra nathar from the Pathala loka temple, Vishwanathar with Vishalakshi from the middle tier temple, and as Mangai pagar from the top tier, which is like a cave (Kudavarai koil). Mangai pagar idol is made up of nine herbs. There are no Nandis, flag posts and Bali peedams in this temple. Lord Muruga appears here with an elephant instead of a Peacock. There is a Mandapam called as Devasaba mandapam. The sacred tree here is Urangapuli (Tamarind). Strangely, the leaves of the Tamarind tree do not fold, tamarind pods fall unripe. Unlike in other temples, rays of sun here fall on the sanctum continuously for six months, generally from Oct–Nov to Mar–Apr. It is one of the shrines of the 275 Paadal Petra Sthalams.

== Poems on this temple ==
Sambandar composed the Thevara Pathigam here.

== Festivals ==
The grand Bhrammotsavam is celebrated in the Tamil month of Chittirai. The Ugra Bhairavar Shrine here witnesses a special festival in the month of Thai. Other festivals here include Kartikai Deepam, Arudra Darisanam, Vinayaka Chaturthi and Navaratri.
