= Thayamangalam =

- Village
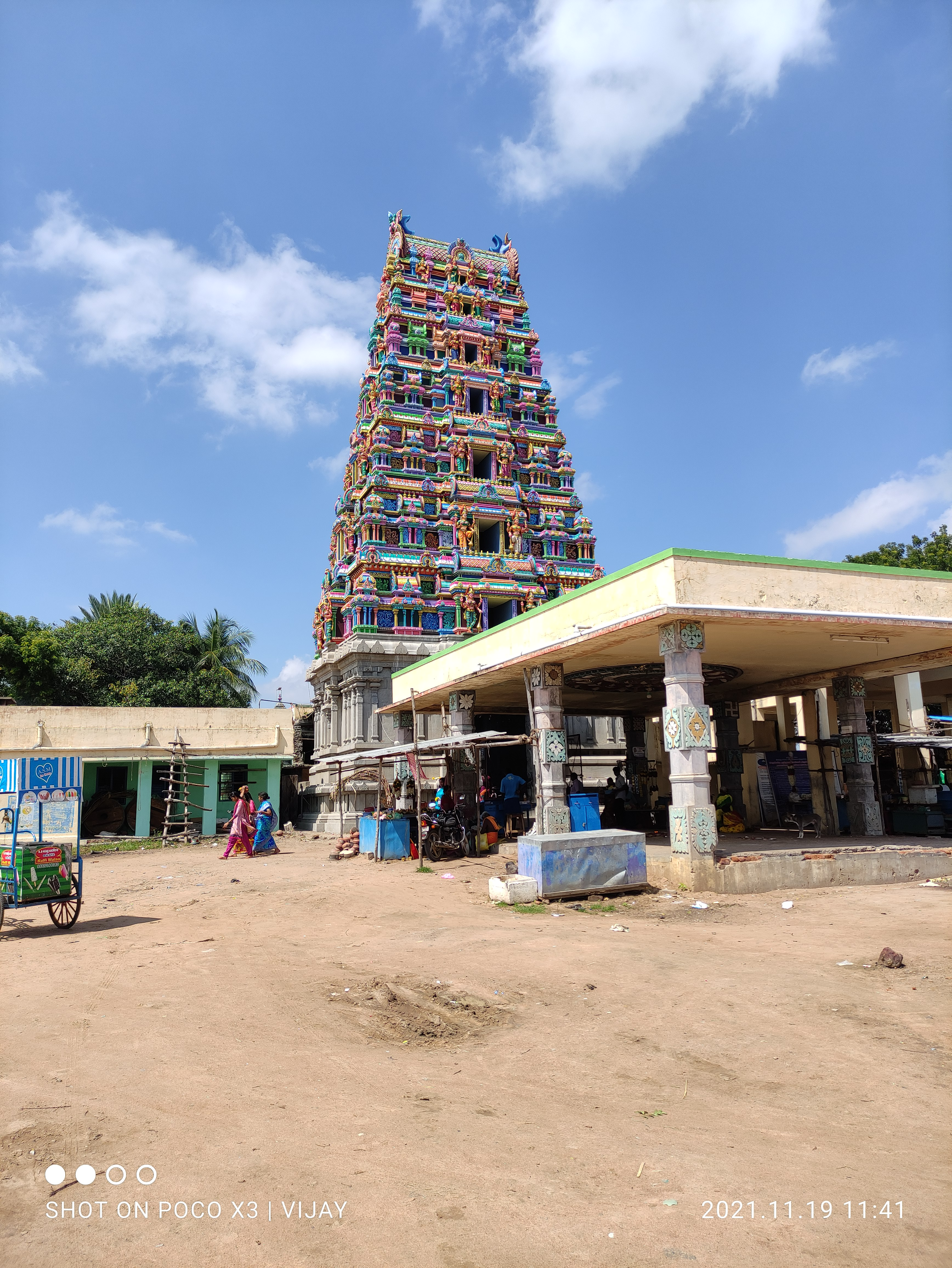
- Shree Muthumari Amman Temple Entrance

- Location within Tamil Nadu
- Coordinates: 9.68°N 78.60°E
- Country: India
- State: Tamil Nadu
- District: Sivaganga
- Taluk: Ilayangudi taluk
- Elevation: 41 m (135 ft)
- Time zone: UTC+05:30 (IST)
- Postal code: 630709

Thayamangalam is a small town in the Sivaganga district in the Indian state of Tamil Nadu. The town is located 68 km from Madurai and 18 km away from Manamadurai and 25 km away from the district capital Sivaganga. The village is home for the Infamous Arulmigu Muthu Mari Amman Temple. This village comes under the Ilaiyankudi block.

== Etymology ==
The Name comes from two words "Thaai" and "Mangalam". The word Thaai means Mother in Tamil and the word Mangalam refers to a settlement around a religious institution in Devanagari - Tamili script. Collectively means settlement of goddess mother Muthumari.

== History ==
Three hundred years ago, farmers of Ramnad region have travelled and traded their crops in Madurai, The Capital city of Pandya kingdom

== Panguni festival ==
Saint Thirugnanasambandhar was invited to Madurai by Queen Pandimadevi Mangayarkarasi for the prosperity of Saivam religion. Saint Appar said that as the day of Sambandar's visit falls on star of Bharani and it is auspicious for travelling. Bharani is also the best time for Conducting homam and setting up brick kiln etc. as this day is suitable for Agni (fire). He started his travel after worshiping God and Goddess by singing Kolaru Padhipaggam. He fought for the freedom of Saivam against the Jainism. Based on the belief in the concept that "each day is a good day", he did Navasakthi Homam and Vinayaka Pooja on the 15th day of Panguni and celebrated 10 days festival from the 16th day of Panguni at Thayamangalam. Pongal festival is being celebrated on the 7th day ( 22nd day of Panguni), Milk pot festival and Flower Pallakku on the Panguni 23rd day. The festival will be completed on 25th day of Panguni after celebrating Devasthana Theertha vari function.a

Archana is performed at the same time for Moolavar and Urchavar in different locations. This is a speciality in this shrine.
