= Alangudi (Sivaganga) =

Neighbourhood in Sivaganga district, Tamil Nadu, India

- Neighbourhood
- Alangudi, Sivaganga district, Tamil Nadu
- Coordinates: 10.0410°N 78.6943°E
- Country: India
- State: Tamil Nadu
- District: Sivaganga
- Elevation: 99.23 m (325.6 ft)

Population (2011)
  - Total: 2,042

Languages
  - Official: Tamil, English
  - Speech: Tamil, English
- Time zone: UTC+5:30 (IST)
- PIN: 630307
- Other Neighbourhoods: Poyyalur, Devapattu, Koothalur
- LS: Sivaganga
- VS: Tiruppattur, Sivaganga

Alangudi is a village in Sivaganga district of Tamil Nadu State in South India. Its area pin code is 630307.

== Location ==
Alangudi is located with the coordinates of (10.0410°N 78.6943°E) in Sivaganga district.

Alangudi (Sivaganga) (Tamil Nadu)

== Population ==
As per 2011 census of India, the total population of Alangudi was 2042, out of which males constituted 2021 and females were 2021.

== Politics ==
The village is located under the (Tiruppattur, Sivaganga Assembly constituency) and Sivaganga Lok Sabha constituency.
