= Thiruppachethi =

Thiruppachetti Tiruppachi
- Town
- Nickname: City of Thiruppachi Bill Hooks
- Interactive map of Thiruppachetti
- Coordinates: 9°49′37″N 78°15′24″E
- Country: India
- State: Tamil Nadu
- District: Sivaganga
- Named for: Sambanthar

Government
  - Type: Town Panchayat
  - Body: Thiruppachetti Town Panchayat

Area
  - Total: 10 km^{2} (3.9 sq mi)
- Elevation: 89 m (292 ft)

Population (2011)
  - Total: 6,132
  - Density: 610/km^{2} (1,600/sq mi)

Languages
  - Official: Tamil
- Time zone: UTC+5:30 (IST)
- Postal code: 630 610
- Vehicle registration: TN 63
- Website: https://sivaganga.nic.in/about-district/administrative-setup/development-administration/

Thirupachethi also known as Thirupachi is a Town in Manamadurai block of Sivagangai District on the highway of Madurai-Rameswaram (NH-49) in Tamil Nadu, India.

Nickname for this town is thirupachi as this town is famous for billhook in the brand name "Thirupachi Aruval". This town falls under Tiruppuvanam taluk of sivagangai district. This town is administratively classified as one of the headquarters of the three existing firkas of thiruppuvanam taluk of sivagangai district. This town is also famous for being featured in C. Joseph Vijay's movie Thiruppachi who later became the chief minister of the state.

== Believed History ==
The name of this village is given after an event of religious quarrel between Thirugnana Sambanthar and some Jains. According to the legend, Campanthar dueled with Jains through two mediums: water and fire. In the duel of water both released a palm leaf that was inscribed with their religious belief in the Vaigai River. Which leaf swims across the fled of river will be the winner. And it is said that leaf released by Sambanthar reached Thiruvedagam (thiru=yadu=agam), while the palm leaf released by Jains reached this village and be called thirupasethy (thiru+pa+sethy) later to be known as Thiruppachetti.

== Thiruppachethi Arivaal (Cast Iron Billhook) ==

The billhook (Aruval or Aruva) is a handmade cast iron weapon famous to name of the village, through its quality and Local Tradition of making over many years. Recently movies have also been made based on this weapon. These machetes are made purely for agricultural purpose. The town has also been referred to as Thirupaachi commonly in movies and songs.

== Transportation ==
There are direct and indirect buses from Madurai Periyar bus stand to Thirupachetty. All buses with number 99 go to Thirupachetty. And almost all buses to Ramnad and Paramakudi from Madurai except - buses will stop here in Thirupachetty. Passenger Trains from Madurai to Rameswaram also stop here. Thiruppachetty is about 30 km. south east of Madurai and 18 km west to Manamadurai. Tiruppachetti Tollgate is an important tollgate present in the Madurai Rameswaram Highway. Train Station Code for Tiruppachetti railway station is TPC

== Hospitals and doctors ==
Thiruppachetti has one government primary health center, and also has three private clinics.

== Temples ==
  - Arulmigu Marunokkum Poonkuzhali Udanaaya Thirunokkiya Azhagiyanathar Temple (அருள்மிகு மருநோக்கும் பூங்குழலி சமேத திருநோக்கிய அழகிய நாதர் திருக்கோயில் திருப்பாச்சேத்தி), Thirupachethi, Sivaganga, Tamil Nadu. This temple is famous for prathosam, this temple has a unique Kala Bhairava shrine with two Vahanas.
  - Sridevi, Bhudevi Sametha Malaimandala Srinivasa Perumal temple.
  - Kaaraludaya Ayaanar Temple
  - Arulmigu Swarna Kaleeswarar Temple
  - Marudhudaya Ayyanar Temple
  - Kaatuppillayar Temple

=== Other Temples ===
  - Azhagiyanayagi Amman Temple
  - Sivan temple
  - Arulmigu Kamatchi Amman Temple
  - Sri Sappani karuppan Swami temple
  - Sri Makkal kathaal Kamakshi amman temple
  - Kamachiamman Sonai Swami Temple
  - Sri Muneeswaran Temple
  - The famous Marandu Karuppana Swamy Temple, (மாரநாடு கருப்பண்ணசாமி கோயில்) is near this place.

You can reach this place by getting down at Thiruppachetti and take share auto from there. Bus Number 99 from Madurai Periyar to Thiruppachetti ply between these two places. There is one direct bus from Madurai Periyar Bus stand to Marandu.
