= Palavangudi =

- Village
- Location in Tamil Nadu
- Coordinates: 10°08′05″N 78°43′25″E
- Country: India
- State: Tamil Nadu
- District: Sivaganga
- Time zone: UTC+5.30 (IST)

Palavangudi is a rural village located in the southern-most state of Tamil Nadu in the Republic of India. Palavangudi is one of 44 panchayat villages in the Sivaganga District's Kallal revenue block. According to the 2011 Census of India, it was home to 1,872 residents (945 male and 927 female). The primary language of the region is Tamil.

The elevation of Palavangudi is 108m / 354feet. It has a tropical wet and dry climate with a temperature range of 37 °C/98.6 °F in summer to 28 °C/82.4 °F in winter. The average yearly rainfall in the district is 931 mm /36.65in, the majority of which occurs from October to December, during the Indian northeast monsoon.

Palavangudi is located 6 hr 54 min (413.4 km) via NH38 and NH32 south/southwest of the state capitol of Chennai and 54 min (48.5 km) via Edaiyur north/northeast of Sivaganga District headquarters. The village is accessible by train via Chettinad Rail Way Station (7 km away). The Tiruchirapalli International Airport is about 70 from the village.

The Sivaganga district is known for its religious sites. Tourist destinations include several Hindu temples famous in the region.

Official website: http://www.palavai.com/
