= Keelappoongudi =

- Village
- Location in Tamil Nadu, India Keelappoongudi (India)
- Coordinates: 9.9636838°N 78.4903415°E
- Country: India
- State: Tamil Nadu
- District: Sivaganga

Languages
  - Official: Tamil
- Time zone: UTC+5:30 (IST)

Keelappoongudi is a panchayat Village in Sivaganga district in the Indian state of Tamil Nadu. This village is under the control of Sivaganga block. Sivaganga taluk
