= Thirumansolai =

- Village
- Country: India
- State: Tamil Nadu
- District: Sivagangai

Languages
  - Official: Tamil
- Time zone: UTC+5:30 (IST)

Thirumansolai is a small village located on Sivagangai to Madurai National Highways in Sivagangai District, Tamil Nadu state, India.
