= Sakkottai block =

Revenue block in India

Sakkottai block is a revenue block in the Sivaganga district of Tamil Nadu, India. It has a total of 26 panchayat villages.
