= Tiruppattur block =

Revenue block in India

Tiruppattur block is a revenue block in the Sivaganga district of Tamil Nadu, India. It has a total of 40 panchayat villages.
