= Devakottai block =

Devakottai block is a revenue block in the Sivaganga district of Tamil Nadu, India. It has a total of 42 panchayat villages.
