= Alampattu =

- Village
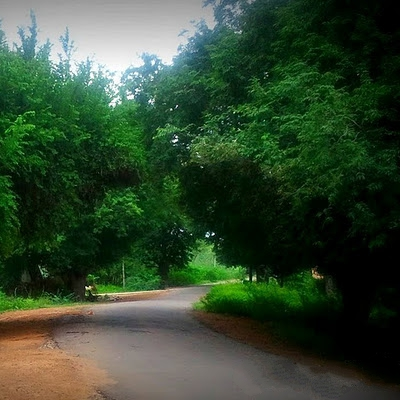
- Alampattu Green

- Location in Tamil Nadu, India
- Coordinates: 9.968°N 78.685°E
- Country: India
- State: Tamil Nadu
- District: Sivaganga

Languages
  - Official: Tamil
- Time zone: UTC+5:30 (IST)
- PIN: 630305
- Telephone code: 04565
- Website: www.alampattu.com

Alampattu is a village in the state of Tamil Nadu, Sivaganga District, India. It is 20 km from the town Karaikudi.

Alampattu is properly located on the Kallal–Devakottai Highway and situated on south to river Varshalei Manimutharu. District Headquarters Sivaganga Town is at 36 km via Kalayar Kovil by road. Karaikudi Town which is 20 km from the Alampattu village is the educational and financial hub of Sivaganga district, and Ramnad district of Tamil Nadu state in India.

== Administration ==
Alampattu (*Alampattu North * Alampattu South * Alampattu Lalipathi)

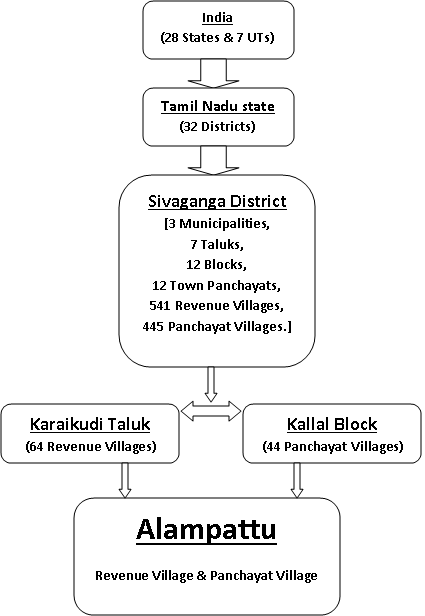
Alampatttu flowchart

- Alampattu Revenue Village (RV) borders north with Kurunthampattu RV, to the south, Keelapongudi RV, to the east, Vilavadiyendal RV, to the west, Aranmanai Siruvayal RV.
- Alampattu Panchayat Village (PV) borders north with Kurunthampattu PV, to the south, Keelapongudi PV, to the east, Veppankulam PV, to the west, Aranmanai Siruvayal PV.

=== Elected People's Representatives ===
Alampattu village is a part of Karaikudi (State Assembly Constituency) and Sivaganga (Lok Sabha constituency).

Status in 2018
Village panchayat	Alampattu Panchayat	Panchayat President	Panchayat President
State Legislative Assembly Seats – 235	Karaikudi Constituency	Member of LA	K. R. Ramasamy Elected in 2016
National Parliament (Lok Sabha) Constituency Seats −543	Sivaganga Constituency	Member of Parliament	P. R. Senthilnathan Elected in 2014

== Transport ==
=== By road ===
The state-run TNSTC and private omnibus operates services en-route Alampattu to places in and around the region. Karaikudi, the educational and financial hub of the region, is well connected by TNSTC; private omnibus operates services to Devakottai, Kallal and Madurai, via Alampattu.

- NH 210 (old) – National Highway 210 (Tiruchirapalli– Pudukottai–Karaikudi–Devakottai–Ramanathapuram–Rameshwaram–Dhanushkodi)

New NH number

- National Highway 336 (Tiruchirapalli–Pudukottai–Tirumayam)
- National Highway 536 (Tirumayam–Karaikudi–Devakottai–Ramanathapuram–Rameshwaram–Thanus kodi)
- SH 29 – State Highway 29 (Pattukottai–Aranthangi–Karaikudi–Kallal–Kalayar Kovil–Illayankudi-Paramakudi–ECR (East Coast Road)–Sayalkudi)
- MDR – Major District Road (Kallal–Kottur–Devakottai)

=== By rail ===
Alampattu is well connected by rail network, the nearest railhead Kallal (KAL) train station (3 km) and Karaikudi Junction(KKDi) train station (24 km) from Alampattu village, caters train service to Tiruchirappalli Junction (TPJ), Thanjavur (TJ), Erode (ED), Coimbatore (CBE), Pondicherry (PDY), Sengottai (SCT), Tirunelveli (TEN), Kanyakumari (CAPE) and to the state capital "Chennai" Chennai Egmore (MS), within the state of Tamil Nadu. Other important cities like Visakhapatnam (VSKP), Bhubaneswar (BBS), Vijayawada (BZA), Nagpur (NGP), Allahabad (ALD), and to the Hindu holy city of "Kashi" Varanasi (BSB) & Ayodhya (AY) (North India) and Rameshwaram (RMM) (South India) are well connected by Indian Railways.

The Boat Mail Express is one among the oldest train services in operation running since February 1914, in the region. At the time of its initial induction into service, was operated from Madras Egmore (Chennai Egmore) to Colombo in Ceylon, with boat ferry service in between connecting from Dhanushkodi (India) to Talaimannar in Ceylon, from Talaimannar passenger board another train service on CEYLON RAILWAYS network to Colombo. Post 1964 Cyclon, this train service route was shortened to operate between Chennai Egmore and Rameshwaram Town – Rameshwaram Express.

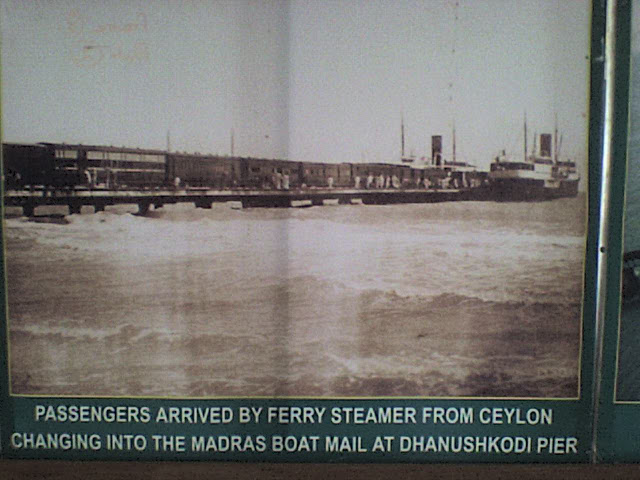
Passengers from Colombo (Ceylon) boarding Boat Mail Express at Dhanushkodi

==== Major train services ====
- Boat Mail Express (Rameshwaram Express, Chennai Egmore-Rameshwaram-Chennai Egmore)
- Sethu Express (Chennai Egmore-Rameshwaram-Chennai Egmore)
- Pallavan Express (Chennai Egmore-Karaikudi-Chennai Egmore)
- Silambu Express (Chennai Egmore-Sengottai-Chennai Egmore)
- Pondichery Express (Pondichery–Kanyakumary–Pondichery)
- Coimbatore Express (Coimbatore–Rameshwaram–Coimbatore)
- Varanasi Express {Varanasi–Rameshwaram–Varanasi}
- Bhuvaneswar Express (Bhuvaneswar–Rameshwaram–Bhuvaneswar)
- Velankani Express (Kollam–Velankani Basilica of Our Lady of Good Health –Kollam)
- Shraddha Sethu Express (Ayodhya–Rameshwaram–Ayodhya)

=== By air ===
Tiruchirapalli International Airport (TRZ) and Madurai International Airport (IXM) are located at 100 km and 86 km respectively. Chennai International Airport Madras(MAA) is at a distance of 400 km.

== Education ==
The average combined (male and female) literacy rate of Alampattu is at 86%.

== Culture and language ==
Tamil is the native language of Alampattu village, while English is widely understood in and around the region.

Hindu religion is predominant, and few percentage of people embrace faith of Christianity and Islam in nearby villages.

== Temples of Alampattu ==
(from south to north)

- • Sonayya kovil
- • Muni ayya kovil
- • Kalliychi Amman Kovil
- • Sree Vinayaka Kovil
- • Arulmigu Sree Mahakaliamman Thiru Kovil
- • Sree Thandauthapani Kovil
- • Sula Pidari Amman Kovil
- • Velavadi Karupar Kovil

== Festivals of Alampattu ==
- Thai Pongal தைப்பொங்கல் (January)
- Mattu Pongal மாட்டுப் பொங்கல் (January)
- Alampattu Pongal ஆலம்பட்டு பொங்கல் (May)

== Climate ==
Alampattu in general is dry and semi-arid, with mean annual rainfall of 745.87mm. The maximum and minimum temperature are 22 degree Celsius and 39 degree Celsius, average temperature at 28.1 degree Celsius .

April, May and June have the hottest temperatures, rising to 36 degree Celsius and above, while the cool month begins with the start of November prevailing till the end of January with temperature ranging from 27.6 degree Celsius to 29.8 degree Celsius.

== Agriculture ==
Major portion of the cultivable land depend on rainfed water, remaining is under irrigation system depends on tank, well for water source. Once upon a time Alampattu land used to raise double crop in a year with rainwater harvesting method; Oorani (Tank), now this region accounts for low average rainfall, Due to uneven rainfall coupled with dry and semi arid condition of the land resulting in low agricultural productivity have urged the State Government to come up with programs like the Integrated Watershed Management Program to extend financial support to the marginal farmers and educating them on productive planning and executing.

== Water bodies ==
- Sithan(r) Kammoi
- Budh(a) Oorani
- Pi Budh(a) Oorani
- Vannaan (washerman) Oorani

Agri produce –

- Paddy (Rice)
- Mango
- Coconut
- Cashew nut
- Ground nut
- Black gram

Livestock –

- Cow
- Cattle
- Goat
- Poultry

== Photos ==
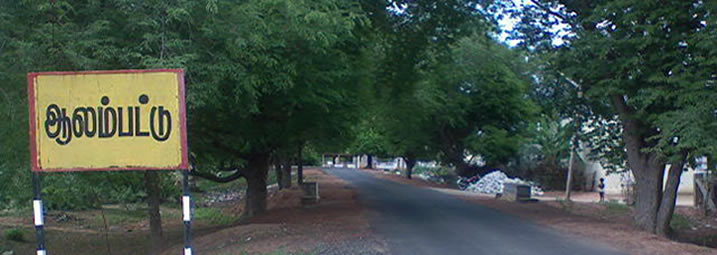
Alampattu South Entrance

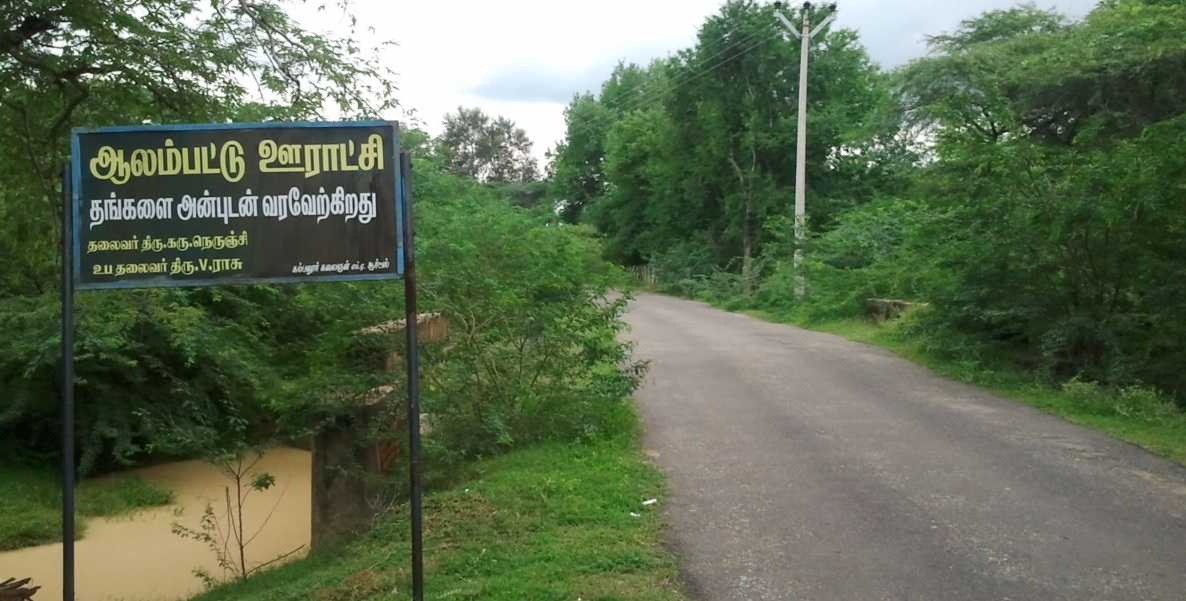
Alampattu North Entrance

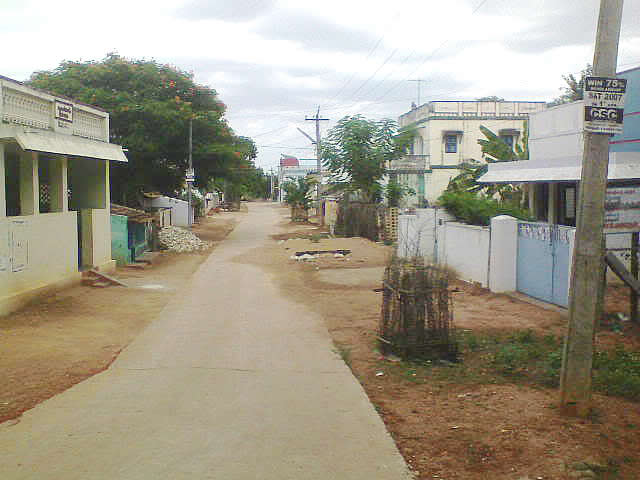
Alampattu South 1st Street

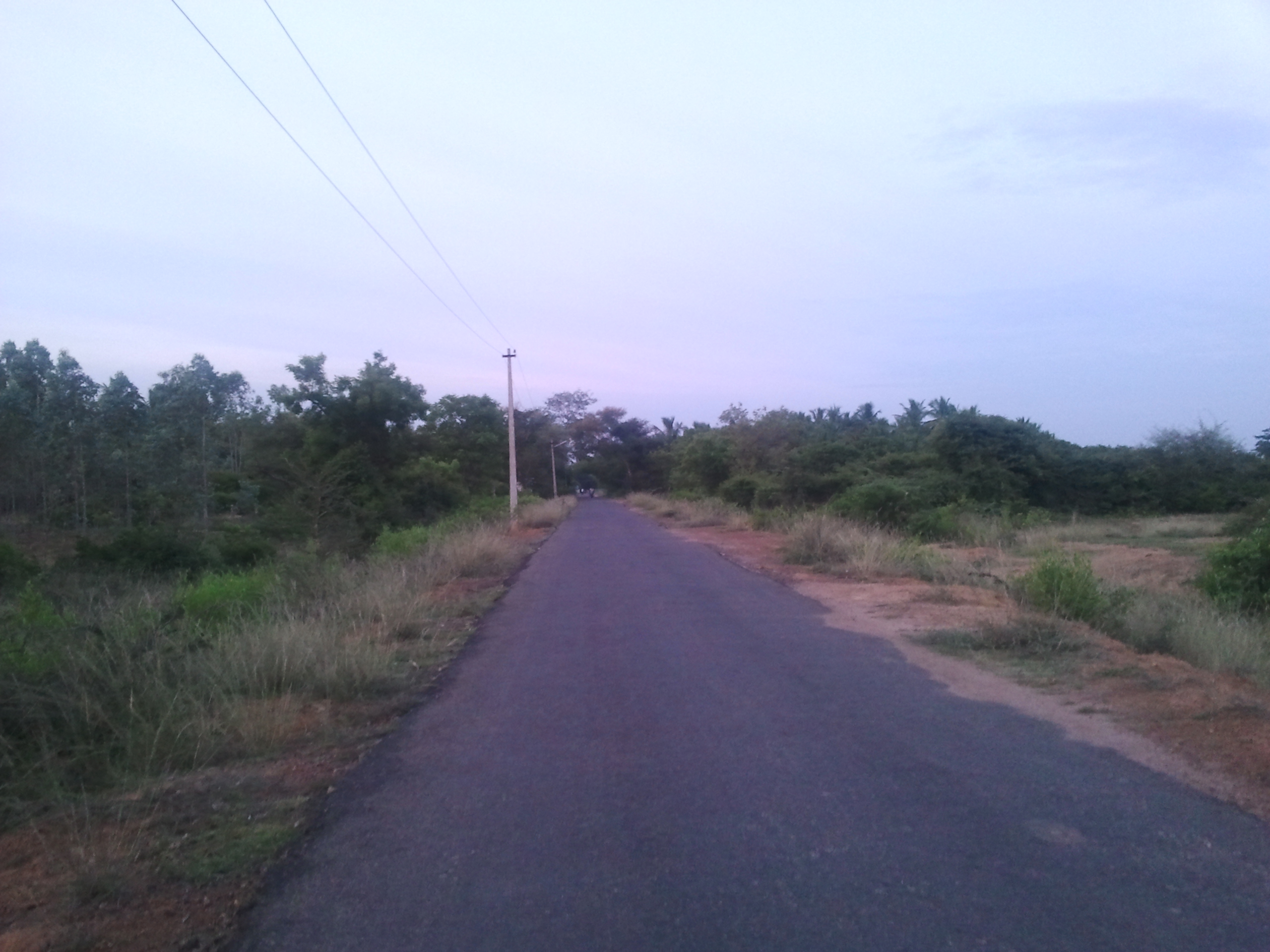
Alampattu Approach Road From Vilakku Road Jn

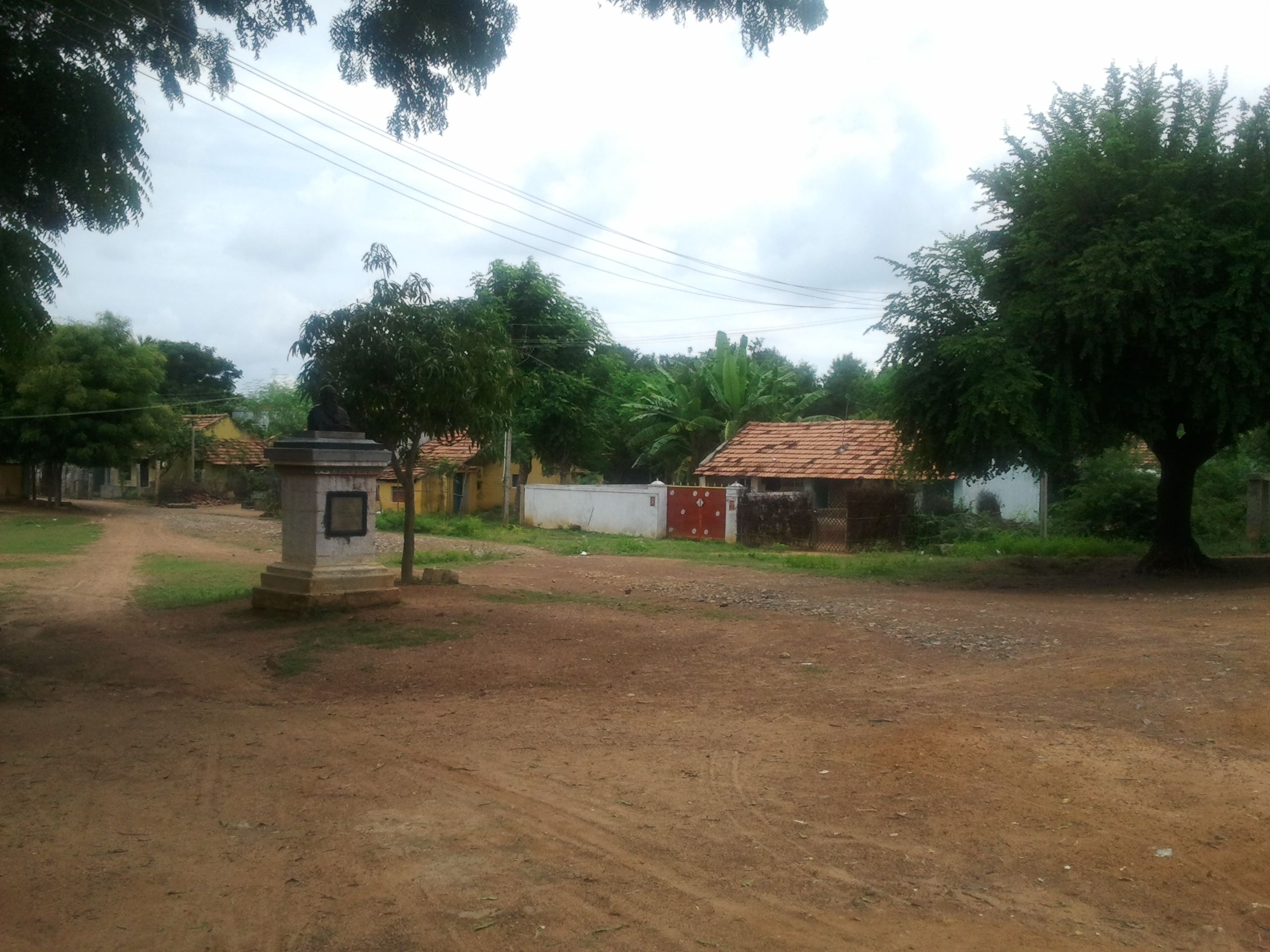
Periyar Statue Alampattu South

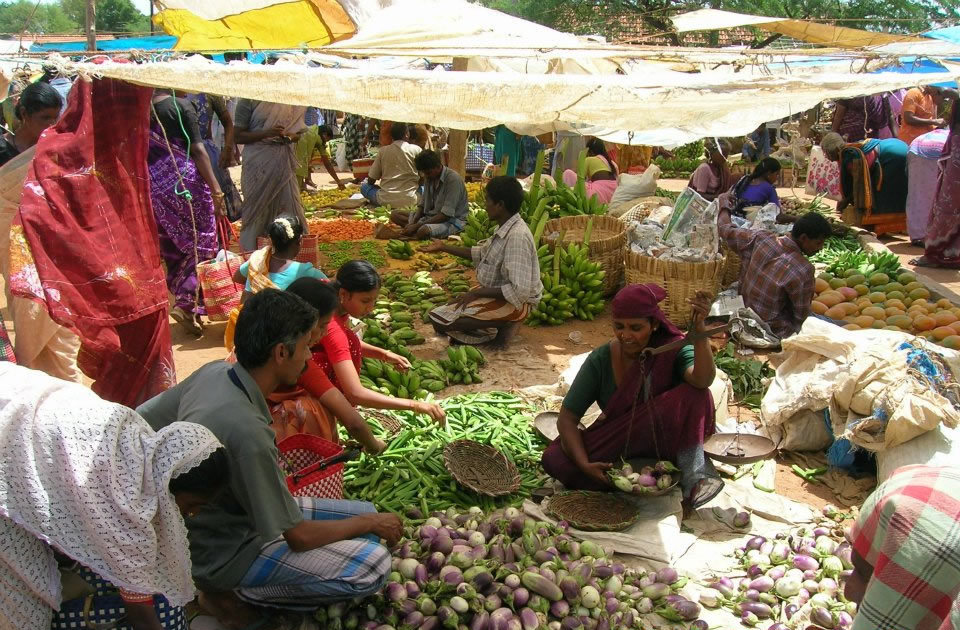
Alampattu-Kallal Market

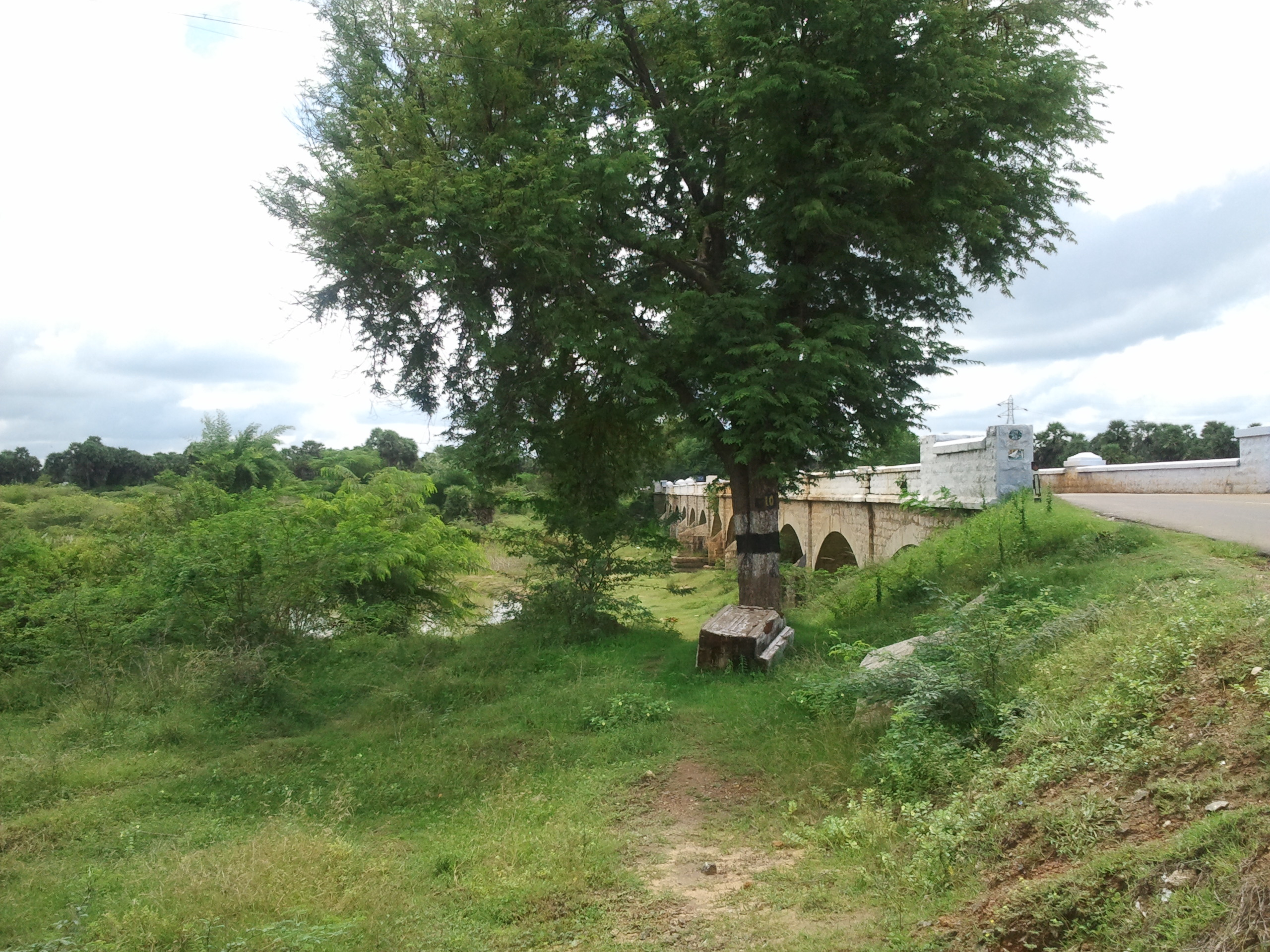
Kallal Bridge Across River Varshalei Manimutharu
