= Madagupatti =

- Village
- Location in Tamil Nadu, India Madagupatti (India)
- Coordinates: 9.87°N 78.48°E
- Country: India
- State: Tamil Nadu
- District: Sivaganga

Languages
  - Official: Tamil
- Time zone: UTC+5:30 (IST)
- PIN: 630553
- Telephone code: 04575

Madagupatti is a village in Sivaganga district in the Indian state of Tamil Nadu. This village is part of Sivaganga taluk in the Sivaganga district.

== Temples ==
Madagupatti is home to a famous Shiva temple and a 125-year-old Santhana Gopala Krishnan temple (renovated in 2007) both near the bus terminus and a mosque in Sivagangai.

== Industries ==
Jeyesundaram cotton mill (not existing now), rajayogan sugarcane industry.
