= Kannankudi block =

Kannankudi block is a revenue block in the Sivaganga district of Tamil Nadu, India. It has a total of 17 panchayat villages.
