= Devapattu =

Devapattu Thevapattu
- Village
- Location in Tamil Nadu, India Devapattu (India)
- Coordinates: 9.997612°N 78.686249°E
- Country: India
- State: Tamil Nadu
- District: Sivaganga
- Talukas: Karaikudi Taluk
- Elevation: 52 m (171 ft)

Population (2007)
  - Total: 1,654

Languages
  - Official: Tamil
- Time zone: UTC+5:30 (IST)
- Telephone code: 91-4565
- Nearest city: Karaikudi

Devapattu is a rural village located near the banks of the Manimuttar River in Sivaganga District, Tamil Nadu, falling under the Karaikudi Taluk. The village is home to around 1,000 residents and is composed of several smaller hamlets, including Chinna Devapattu, Koilpatti, and Mangampunjai.

== Geography and Location ==
Situated close to the Manimuttar River, Devapattu enjoys a strategic position within the fertile plains of Tamil Nadu. The river provides vital irrigation for the agricultural activities in the region, which is the backbone of the village's economy. The village lies about 15 kilometers east of Karaikudi and around 35 kilometers from Sivaganga, making it well-connected to these nearby towns.

== Population and Demographics ==
With a population of approximately 1,000 people, Devapattu is a small but tight-knit community. The residents primarily follow agriculture as their main livelihood, with farming and related activities providing employment to a significant portion of the village population.

== Cultural Significance ==
Devapattu holds a special place in the hearts of many, particularly those who have roots in the village but have since moved to other parts of Tamil Nadu and beyond. Over the years, the village has produced a number of notable individuals who have risen from humble beginnings to become influential figures within the local community and beyond. These individuals have made significant contributions to the region, helping in the growth and development of the surrounding areas.

== Andarnatchi Amman Temple ==
Andarnatchi Amman Temple is the Family-God of many people in and around Devapattu. It is considered to be a very powerful god. People visit the Amman on Fridays mostly. It is mandatory that the people have to be pure while visiting Andarnatchi Amman Temple. There is also a Manjuviratu which happens annually in the temple celebration. The worship of Andarnatchi Amman during full moon day is considered to be very auspicious.

== Sangili karuppaiah temple ==
Sangili karuppaiah temple is the family-God of many people in and around Devapattu. It is considered to be a very powerful God like Andaranatchi Amman. There is no statue only an "aruva" (big knife) as symbol of God Sangili Karuppaiah.

=== Transportation and Accessibility ===
Devapattu is well-connected to nearby towns like Karaikudi, making it accessible for those who need to travel for work, education, or healthcare. Public transportation, including buses and trains, is available, with the Kallal Railway Station being the nearest railhead. The village's proximity to Karaikudi ensures that its residents have access to better facilities and services, including education and healthcare.
