= Tiruppuvanam block =

Tiruppuvanam block is a revenue block in the Sivaganga district of Tamil Nadu, India. It has a total of 45 panchayat villages.
