= Kalayarkoil block =

Kalayarkoil Town panchayat

Kalayarkoil
- taluk
- Kalayarkoil
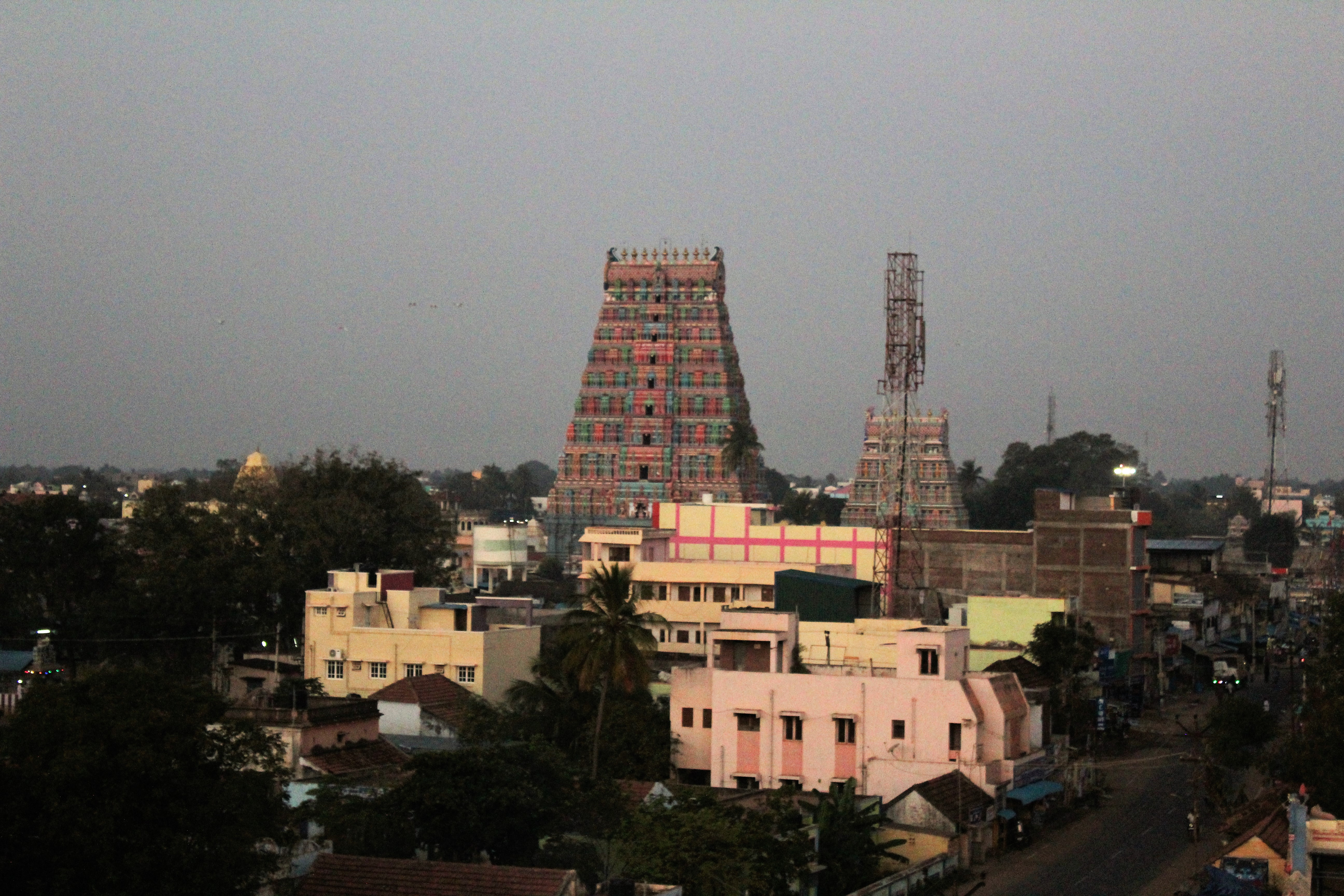
- Kalayarkoil

- Kalayarkoil, Tamil Nadu
- Coordinates: 9.8457°N 78.6314°E
- Country: India
- State: Tamil Nadu
- District: Sivaganga
- Region: Pandya Nadu
- Division: Madurai

Government
  - Type: block
  - Body: kalayarkoil panchayat

Area
  - Total: 43.28 km^{2} (16.71 sq mi)
- Elevation: 94 m (308 ft)

Population (2011)
  - Total: 40,403

Languages
  - Official: Tamil
- Time zone: UTC+5:30 (IST)
- PIN: 630551
- Telephone code: 04575
- Vehicle registration: TN-63
- Distance from Madurai: 63 kilometres (39 mi) WEST (Road)
- Distance from Trichirapalli: 120 kilometres (75 mi) NORTH (Rail)
- Distance from Rameswaram: 134 kilometres (83 mi) SOUTH (Rail)

Kalaiyarkoil is a town in the Sivaganga district of Tamil Nadu, India. It has a total of 43 panchayat villages.
