= Piranmalai =

Piranmalai Piranmalai
- Village
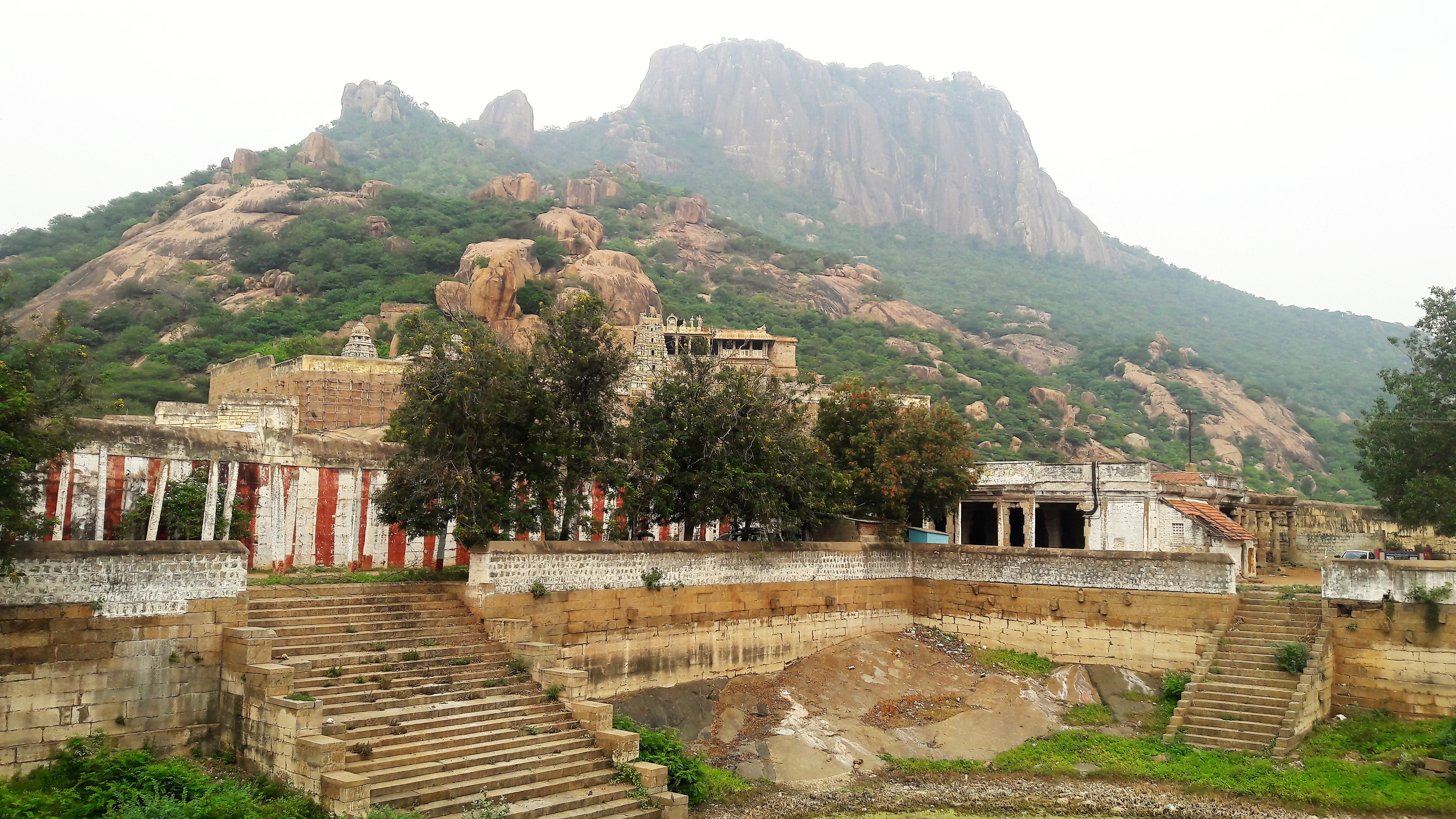

- Location in Tamil Nadu, India Piranmalai (India)
- Coordinates: 10.235859°N 78.437956°E
- Country: India
- State: Tamil Nadu
- District: Sivaganga district
- Postal code: 630502

Piranmalai is a village located in Singampunari Taluk in Sivaganga district, Tamil Nadu, India. The nearest town is Singampunari located 7 kilometers (4.3 mi) away.

Piranmalai is a fortified hill at an elevation of over 2,500 feet (760 m). This is a last outcrop of the Eastern Ghats, with a Bhairavar temple and five peedas in the rocks of the hill called the Pandava Therthams, is also sacred to the Muslims with a dargah of Waliullah Sheikh Abdullah Shaheb on its peak. At the foot hill, there are traces of a moat and Fort Marudhu, which was pulled down in early 19th century.

One of the seven vallal (freehearted), PaariVel pari ruled this area. The barren hill is believed to have been covered with dense jungle in the days of Maruthu Pandiyar's rule from late 17th century to 1801. It was part of a large jungle that extended from the Eastern Ghats to the Palk Straits.

The hilly village includes five areas (Piranmalai Main, Mathagupatti, Pudupatti, Pappapatti, Gopalapuram).

Piranmalai Kodunkundreeswar Temple is a hill temple reached by a flight of steps.

== Festivals ==
The grand Bhrammotsavam is celebrated in the Tamil month of Chittirai. The Ugra Bhairavar Shrine here witnesses a special festival in the month of Thai. Other festivals here include Kartikai Deepam, Arudra Darisanam, Vinayaka Chaturthi and Navaratri.

== Location ==
The bus service to Ponnamaravathi from Madurai Mattuthavani stand goes via this village Piranmalai. There are also several bus services available from Singampunari which is 7 km (4.3 mi) from here. The Dargah and temple is located 20 km (12 mi) from Tiruppathur, 40 km (25 mi) from the city of Karaikudi and 50 km (31 mi) from the city of Pudukottai.
