= Alangudi, Mayiladuthurai =

Alangudi
- village
- Interactive map of Alangudi
- Coordinates: 11.107988°N 79.547699°E
- Country: India
- State: Tamil Nadu
- District: Mayiladuthurai

Population (2001)
  - Total: 1,792

Languages
  - Official: Tamil
- Time zone: UTC+5:30 (IST)

Alangudi is a village in the Mayiladuthurai taluk of Mayiladuthurai district, Tamil Nadu, India.

== Demographics ==
As of 2001 census, Alangudi had a total population of 1892 with 974 males and 918 females. The sex ratio was 943. The literacy rate was 73.37%.
