= Kallal block =

Kallal block is a revenue block in the Sivaganga district of Tamil Nadu, India. It has a total of 44 panchayat villages.
