= Vettangudi Bird Sanctuary =

Bird sanctuary in India

Coordinates: 10.112°N 78.510°E

- IUCN category IV (habitat/species management area)
- Interactive map of Vettangudi Bird Sanctuary
- Location: Sivagangai, Tamil Nadu, India
- Area: 0.38 km^{2} (0.15 sq mi)
- Established: 1977

Vettangudi Bird Sanctuary is a 0.384 km^{2} (0.148 sq mi) protected area, declared in June 1977 near Thirupattur in the then Ramnad District and present day Sivaganga District that includes the periya kollukudi patti, chinna kollukudi patti, and vettangudi patti irrigation tanks.

The heaviest rainfall occurs between October and December, when the northeast monsoon brings in 330–390 mm (13–15 in) of rainfall.

== Fauna ==
This area of small drainage basins attracts more than 8,000 winter migratory birds belonging to 217 species, mostly from European and North Asian countries. It is a breeding habitat for grey herons, darters, spoonbills, white ibis, Asian openbill stork, and night herons. It has also attracted indigenous endangered species including painted stork, grey heron, darter, little cormorant, little egret, intermediate egret, cattle egret, common teal, Indian spot-billed ducks, pintail, and flamingos.
