= Sivaganga block =

Sivaganga block is a revenue block in the Sivaganga district of Tamil Nadu, India. It has a total of 43 panchayat villages.
