= Manamadurai block =

Manamadurai block is a revenue block in the Sivaganga district of Tamil Nadu, India. It has a total of 89 panchayat villages.
