= Ilaiyankudi block =

Revenue block in India

Ilaiyankudi block is a revenue block in the Sivaganga district of Tamil Nadu, India. It has a total of 52 panchayat villages. Its sub-district code is 05834. Its total area is 409 km^{2} of which 391.88 km^{2} is rural and 16.86 km^{2} is urban. According to Census 2011 information, Ilayangudi block has a population of 109,267 people and 28,395 households.

== Population ==
Population type	Males	Females	Total population
Rural	41,540	42,960	84,500
Urban	12,448	12,319	24,767
Total	53,988	52,279	109,267

There are 28,395 households in Ilaiyankudi block, of which 22,448 are rural and 5,947 are urban.

== Villages ==
- Akkavayal
- Alavidangan
- Aranaiyur
- Aranmanaikarai
- Devathakudi
- Ilamanur
- Ilayangudi North
- Ilayangudi South
- Kalaikulam
- Kalangathankottai
- Kannamangalam
- Karaikulam
- Karunchutti
- Katchathanallur
- Kattanur
- Keelanettur
- Keelayur
- Kottaiyur
- Kumarakurichi
- Kurichi
- Melapidariseri
- Melathuraiyur
- Melayur
- Mulliyarendal
- Munaivendri
- Muthur
- N Andakudi
- Nagamuganthankudi
- Nageraakudi
- Nenjathur
- Perumbacheri
- Pudukkottai
- Salaigramam
- Samudram
- Sathanur
- Seevalathi
- Sethugudi
- Sirupalai
- Sooranam
- Thayamangalam
- Thiruudayarpuram
- Thugavoor
- Tiruvallur
- Udayanoor
- Uthamanur
- Vadakkukeeranur
- Valayanendal
- Vallakulam
- Vandal
- Vijayangudi
- Virayathakandan
- Visavanoor

Of these, 1 village has 200–499 inhabitants, 11 villages have 500–999 inhabitants, 27 villages have 1000–1999 inhabitants, 11 villages have 2000–4999 inhabitants, and 1 village has 5000–9999 inhabitants.
