= Thirupuvanam, Sivaganga =

Thiruppuvanam
- Town
- Nickname: Town of billhook
- Interactive map of Thiruppuvanam
- Coordinates: 9°51′18″N 78°16′28″E
- Country: India
- State: Tamil Nadu
- District: Sivaganga

Government
  - Type: Taluk
  - Body: Thiruppuvanam Town Panchayat

Area
  - Total: 20 km^{2} (7.7 sq mi)
- Elevation: 108 m (354 ft)

Population (2011)
  - Total: 30,000
  - Density: 1,500/km^{2} (3,900/sq mi)
- Demonym: puvaniyams

Languages
  - Official: Tamil
- Time zone: UTC+5:30 (IST)
- Postal code: 630611
- Vehicle registration: TN 63
- Website: http://www.townpanchayat.in/thiruppuvanam

Thiruppuvanam is a town in Manamadurai Assembly constituency and also Manamadurai division in the Indian state of Tamil Nadu.

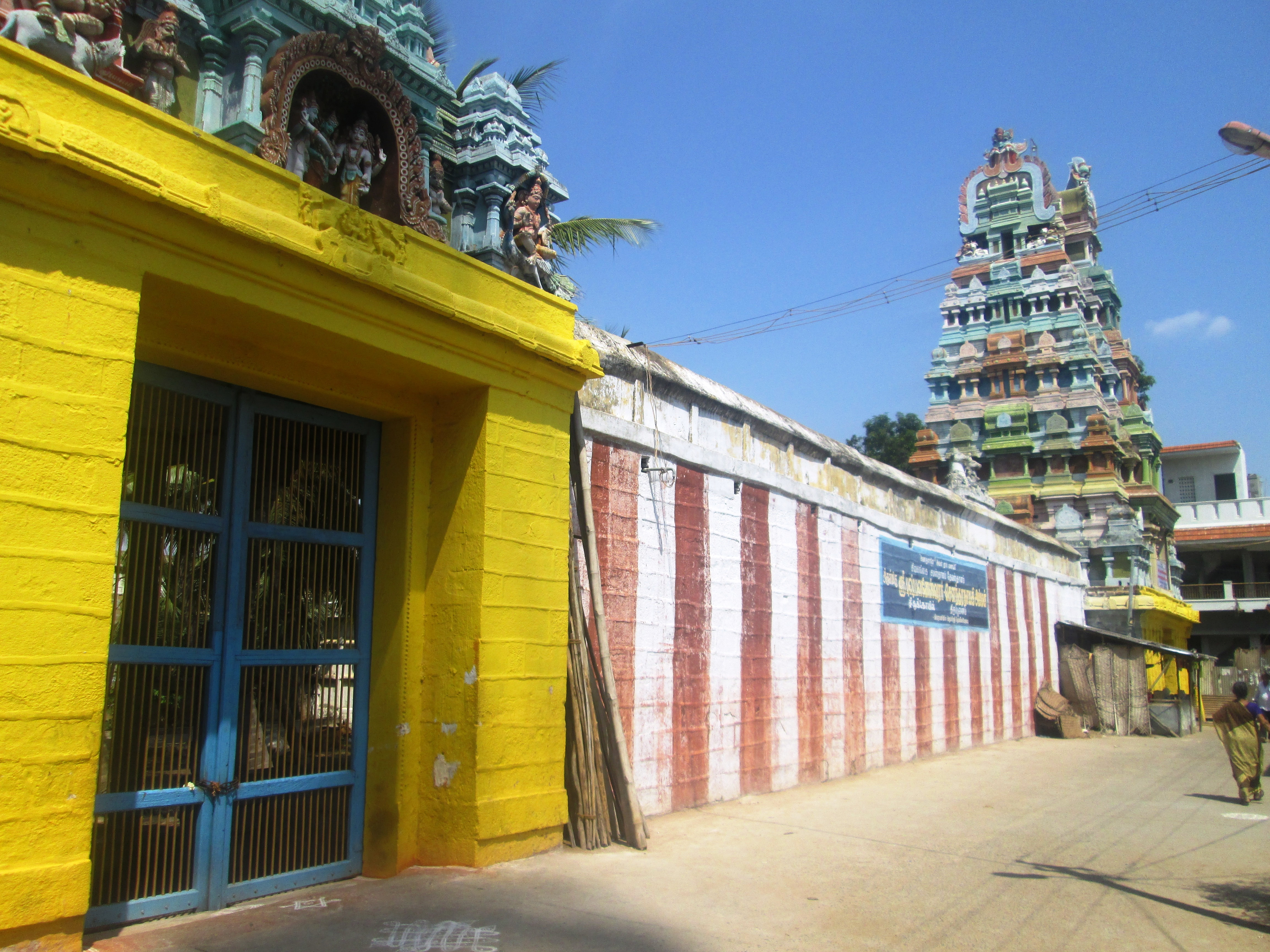
Pushpavaneswarar temple (870–970 CE)

== Geography ==
The town is located in the bank of the Vaigai river. The town lies through NH47 starts from Ernakulam to Dhanushkodi.

== Demographics ==
=== Population ===
As of 2011 India census, Thiruppuvanam had a population of 21,435. Males constitute 50% of the population and females 50%. Thiruppuvanam has an average literacy rate of 74%, higher than the national average of 59.5%: male literacy is 81%, and female literacy is 66%.

== Government and politics ==
This taluk is carved out from Manamadurai taluk. This taluk consist of 3 firkas namely Thiruppuvanam, Thiruppachetti (Thirupachi) and Konthagai

=== Civic Utility / Amenities / Services ===
This town has a police station, society and operation of a fire station is in talks.

== Culture/Cityscape ==
=== Tourist Attractions ===
Pushpavaneswarar temple, which is one of the Padal Petra Shiva sthalams.

== Transport ==
Thiruppuvanam is situated nearby the Temple city of Madurai. on Madurai-Rameswaram National Highway and 18 km to the east of Madurai. Thiruppuvanam falls under Manamadurai assembly.

=== By Air ===
The nearby airport is Madurai international airport In THIRUPPUVANAM town

=== By Road ===
The town has a railway station which is connected with Madurai city. It is the only block in Sivagangai district which comes under the region of Madurai, due to which most of the facilities given to Madurai and its surrounding areas will be available mostly here. Moreover, it is the only block in the Sivagangai district which has the Madurai city bus facilities and also the Sivagangai bus services. This town is famous for billhook. This town has a TNSTC depot and it is one of the two depots of Madurai division which is operating beyond Madurai district.

== Education ==
Due to its nearby location to the city of madurai, many schools, colleges and several industries are present in this taluk and around this town. It is mainly due to the transportation available in this area from madurai.
