= Singampunari =

Singampunari Singampidaari
- Town Panchayat
- Singampunari, Tamil Nadu
- Coordinates: 10.184000°N 78.426500°E
- Country: India
- State: Tamil Nadu
- District: Sivagangai
- Elevation: 177 m (581 ft)

Languages
  - Official: Tamil
- Time zone: UTC+5:30 (IST)
- PIN: 630502
- Telephone code: 04577
- Vehicle registration: TN 63
- Nearest city: Karaikudi
- Literacy: 66.79% Male and 44.36% Female
- Lok Sabha constituency: Sivaganga
- Climate: Mostly Dry (Köppen)

Singampunari is a Taluk in Sivagangai district, in Tamil Nadu, India. The town is located at a distance of 44 km (27 mi) from Karaikudi. The town comes under Singampunari taluk.

== History ==
It was made up of military cantonments.

== Geography ==
=== Climate ===
Singampunari experiences dry weather for most of the year. In the past, a very dense jungle surrounded the place. It was watered by a river which was known in inscriptions as 'Vilisilai Aaru'.

== Demographics ==
=== Population ===
As of 2011 India census, Singampunari had a population of 18,143; males constitute 50% of the population and females 50%. Singampunari has an average literacy rate of 76%, higher than the national average of 59.5%: male literacy is 52%, and female literacy is 48%. In Singampuneri, 10.46% of the population is under 6 years of age.

=== Notable Personalities ===
The notable Tamil actor Sivakarthikeyan, was born in Singampunari.

== Economy ==
Singampunari is an industrial and temple town. It is the home for many groundnut oil mills and many more small scale industries. In Singampunari, the main industry is production of coconut rope. The sub regional office of Coir board is located in Singampunari which covers more than 10 districts. Tamil Nadu's first Coir Mega Cluster Programme is sanctioned for Singampunari. Singai Coirs Cluster is established in Manavottan village, A. Kalapur, Singampunari. Singampunari also constitutes an industrial estate in which South India's second largest forging plant MM forgings, LJ textiles, TeeLabs T-shirts, Tamil Nadu Gears and many auxiliary units are running successfully.

== Culture/Cityscape ==
=== Landmarks ===
Sevuga Perumal Ayyanar Temple

== Transport ==
=== By Road ===
Singampunari is about 44 km from Karaikudi, 61 km from Dindigul, 62 km from Madurai, 65 km from Tiruchi, 216 km from Coimbatore, 8 km from Nellukundupatti and 7 km from Kottampatti, which lies along the Madurai-Chennai highways. It also lies on the Coimbatore - Palani - Karaikudi - Dindigul route. So, all the buses from Coimbatore to Chettinad region via Palani stop in Singampunari.

== Education ==
There are Government elementary schools, middle schools, high schools, and one boys higher secondary school and a girls higher secondary school (Rani Mathurambal Rajayee Memorial govt. girls higher secondary school) with the strength of nearly 1500 pupils each. There are also five private English medium schools (Annai Velankanni Matric. Hr. Sec. School, Parivallal Matric. Hr. Sec. School, Venkateshwara Matric. Hr. Sec. School, S.S. Matriculation School and Karyonz School). One Teachers Training Institute (Madhavan Teacher Training Institute) is also available.

== See also ==
- Mallakottai
- Piranmalai
- Ponnamaravathi

=== Resources ===
History of Singampunari
