= Sivaganga district =

Sivaganga district Sivagangai Seemai
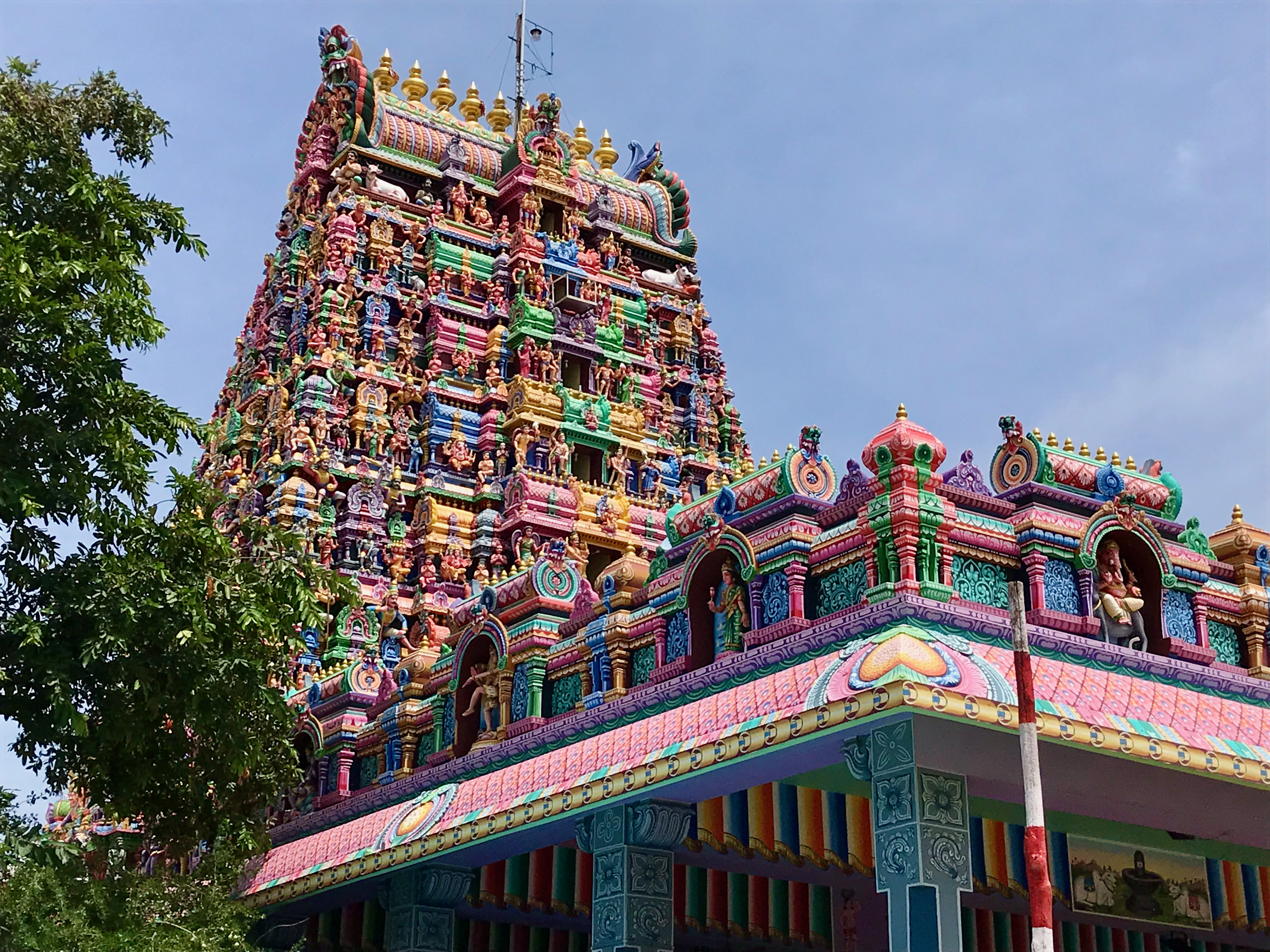
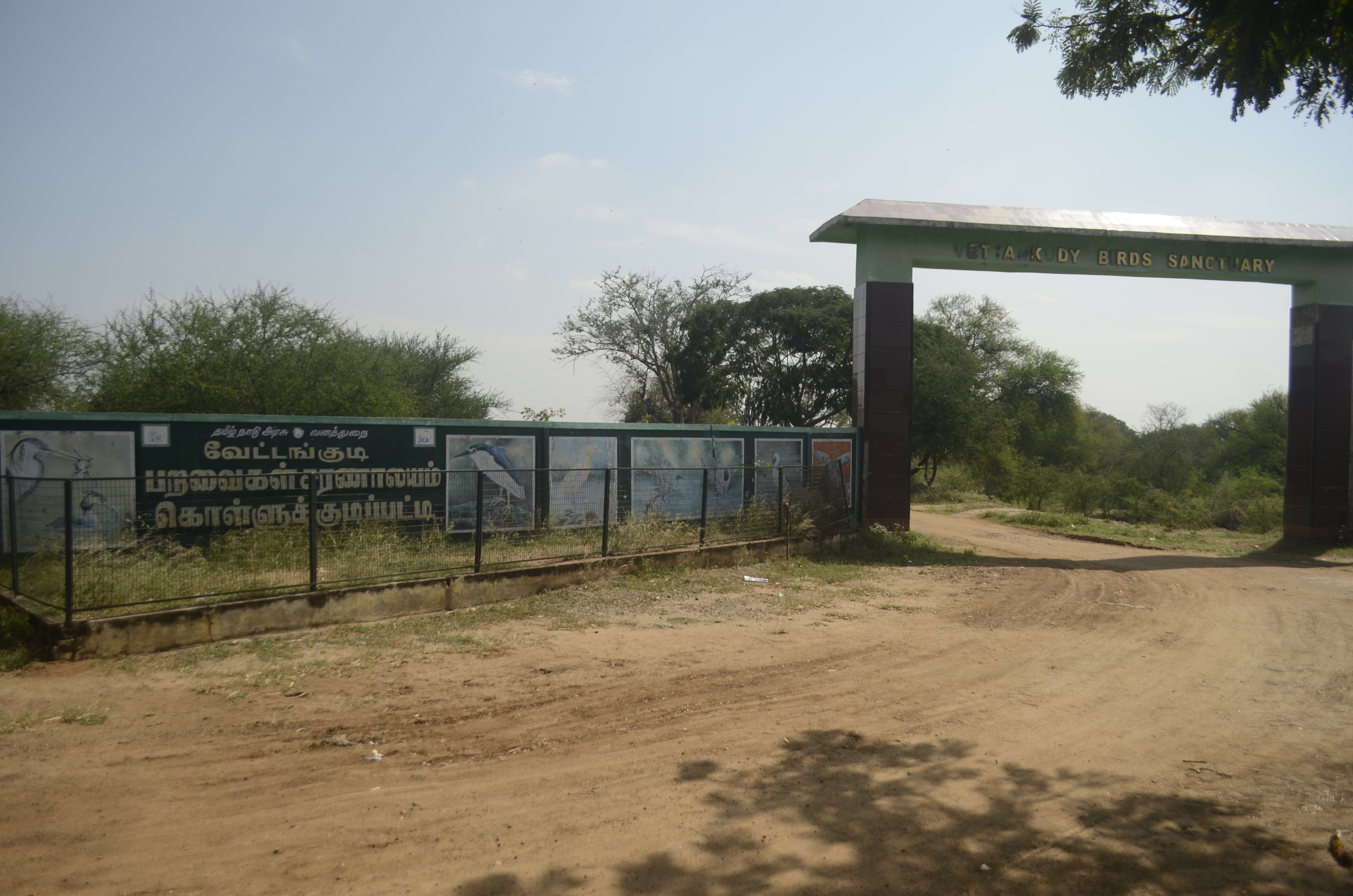
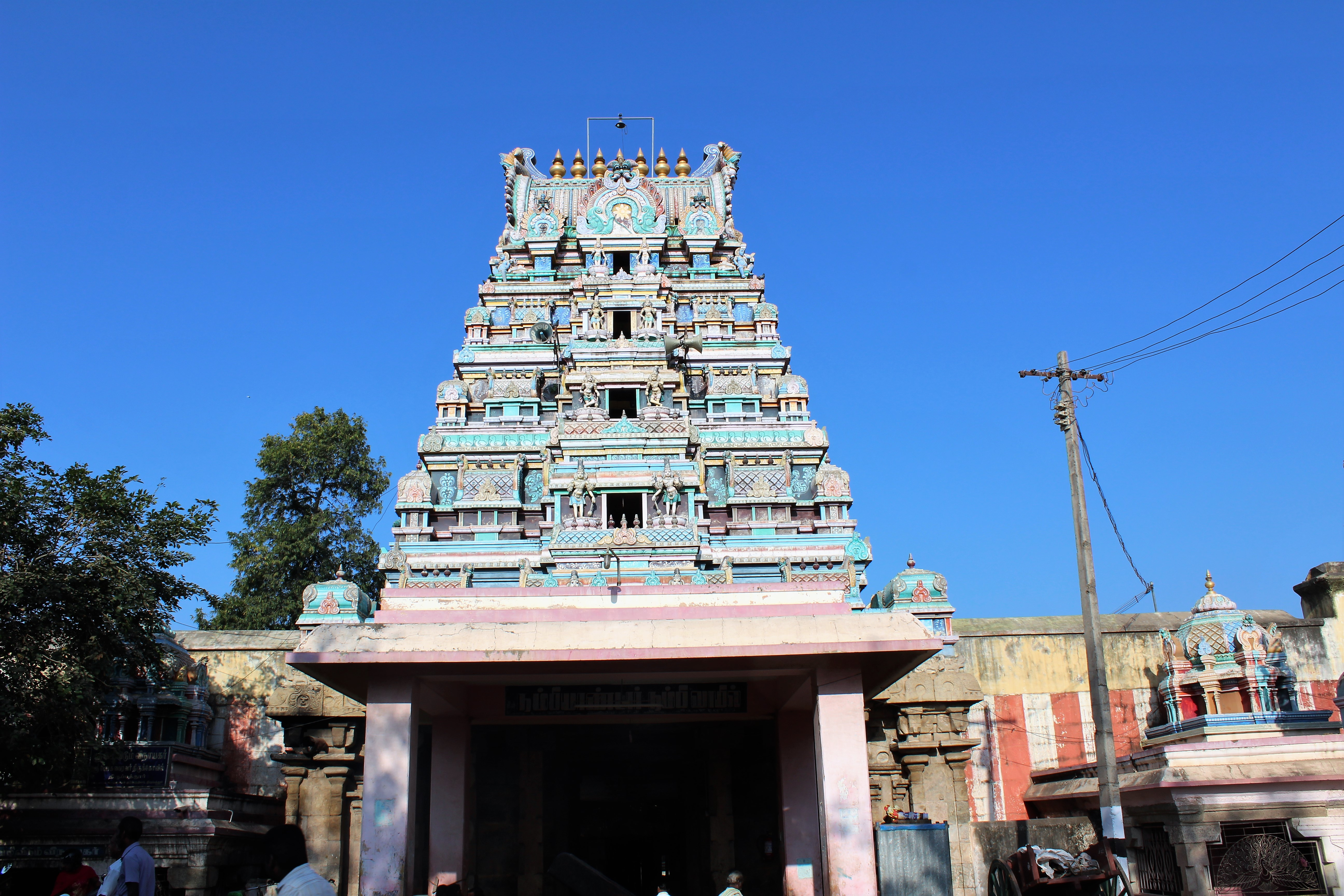
- Clockwise from top-right: Pillaiyarpatti Pillaiyar temple, Vettangudi Bird Sanctuary, Neyyadiyappar temple
- Nickname: Chettinadu
- Location in Tamil Nadu
- Sivagangai district
- Coordinates: 9°43′0″N 78°49′0″E
- Country: India
- State: Tamil Nadu
- City Corporations: Karaikudi
- Municipalities: Devakottai, Manamadurai, Sivagangai
- Headquarters: Sivagangai

Government
  - Body: Sivaganga Lok Sabha constituency
  - Collector: Mrs.Porkodi, IAS
  - Superintendent of Police: Rohit Nathan, IPS

Area
  - Total: 4,189 km^{2} (1,617 sq mi)

Population (2011)
  - Total: 1,339,101
  - Density: 274.7/km^{2} (711/sq mi)

Languages
  - Official: Tamil
- Time zone: UTC+5:30 (IST)
- PIN: 630XXX
- Telephone code: 04575 (Sivagangai region), 04565 (Karaikudi region), 04574 (Manamadurai region), 04577 (Tirupathur region), 04561 (Devakottai region), 04564 (Ilayangudi region).
- ISO 3166 code: ISO 3166-2:IN
- Vehicle registration: TN 63 & TN 63Z (Karaikudi)
- Urban culture: Karaikudi
- Suburban culture: Sivagangai, Karaikudi Urban Agglomeration Suburbs, Devakottai, Kalayarkovil, Manamadurai, Tiruppattur, Sivaganga, Singampunari, Ilayangudi,
- Sex ratio: M-49%/F-51% ♂/♀
- Literacy: 52.5%
- Legislature type: Elected
- Climate: Typical trophics heat and wet with high humidity (Köppen)
- Precipitation: 1,206.2 millimetres (47.49 in)
- Website: sivaganga.nic.in

Sivaganga district (Sivagangai in Tamil; சிவகங்கை மாவட்டம்) is one of the 38 districts that make up the Indian state of Tamil Nadu. The city of Sivaganga is the district headquarters, while Karaikudi is the most populous city, administered by the Karaikudi Municipal Corporation.

It was formed on March 15 of 1985 by the trifurcation of the Ramanathapuram district into Ramanathapuram, Virudhunagar and Sivaganga districts. As of 2011, the district had a population of 1,339,101 with a sex ratio of 1,003 females for every 1,000 males.

== History ==
Sivaganga District has been carved out from composite Ramnad District (G.O. MS. No. 1122 Rev. Dept. Dated 6 July 1984) and the district was functioning from 15 March 1985 (G.O. Ms. No. 346 Rev. dept. Dated 8 March 1985). Since Sivaganga is the headquarters of Sivaganga Lok Shaba Constituency since 1967, the plan was to create a new district with existing constituency areas as of 1984 which is the present day Sivaganga district.

== Demographics ==
Historical population
Year	Pop.	±% p.a.
1901	507,437	—
1911	541,914	+0.66%
1921	558,870	+0.31%
1931	594,132	+0.61%
1941	645,707	+0.84%
1951	670,675	+0.38%
1961	747,159	+1.09%
1971	886,135	+1.72%
1981	996,235	+1.18%
1991	1,103,077	+1.02%
2001	1,155,356	+0.46%
2011	1,339,101	+1.49%

Religions in Sivaganga district (2011)
Religion	Percent
Hinduism	88.57%
Christianity	5.64%
Islam	5.55%
Other or not stated	0.24%

According to the 2011 census, Sivaganga district had a population of 1,339,101 with a sex-ratio of 1,003 females for every 1,000 males, much above the national average of 929. 30.83% of the population lived in urban areas. A total of 137,235 were under the age of six, constituting 70,022 males and 67,213 females. Scheduled Castes and Scheduled Tribes accounted for 17.01% and .06% of the population, respectively. In addition, the average literacy of the district was 71.67%, compared to the national average of 72.99%, while the district had a total of 338,938 households. On the other hand, there is a total of 620,171 workers, comprising 117,030 cultivators, 122,166 main agricultural labourers, 9,864 in house hold industries, 212,042 other workers, 159,069 marginal workers, 23,973 marginal cultivators, 77,397 marginal agricultural labourers, 4,792 marginal workers in household industries and 52,907 other marginal workers. Tamil is the predominant language, spoken by 99.14% of the population.

== Geography ==
Sivaganga district of Tamil Nadu spreads over 4,189 km^{2} (1,617 sq mi). The geographical position of Sivaganga district is between 9° 43' and 10° 2' north latitude and between 77° 47' and 78° 49' east longitude. It is bounded by the districts of Pudukkottai on the northeast, Tiruchirappalli on the north, Ramanathapuram on the southeast, Virudhunagar on the southwest and Madurai on the west. Other large towns include Devakottai, Manamadurai, Kalayar Kovil, Ilaiyangudi, Thiruppuvanam, Singampunari and Tiruppattur. Piranmalai is the only hill area located in sivagangai district. Major river which passes through the Sivagangai district is Vaigai River.

== Politics ==
District	No.	Constituency	Name	Party	Alliance	Remarks
Sivaganga	184	Karaikudi	T. K. Prabhu	TVK	TVK+	Cabinet Minister
Sivaganga	185	Tirupattur	Srinivasa Sethupathi	TVK	TVK+	
Sivaganga	186	Sivaganga	Kulanthai Rani	TVK	TVK+	
Sivaganga	187	Manamadurai (SC)	D. Elangovan	TVK	TVK+	

== Administration ==
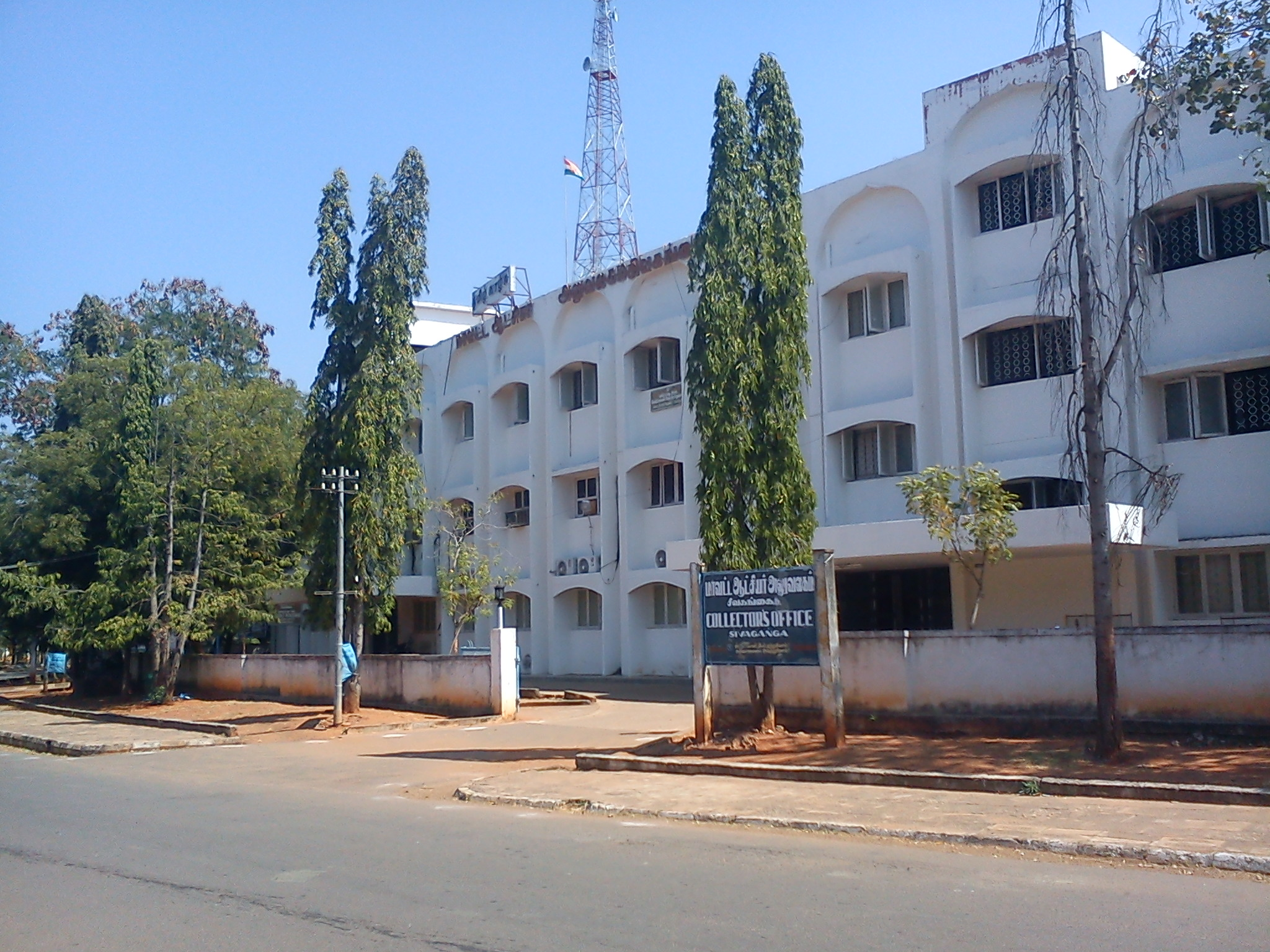
District Collector Office-Sivagangai

Sivaganga district has 9 taluks in 2 revenue divisions.

Revenue Division	Taluks	No. of revenue villages
Sivaganga	5 (Manamadurai, kalayarkovil, Sivaganga, Thiruppuvanam, Ilayangudi)	455
Devakottai	4 (Devakottai, Karaikudi, Tiruppattur, Singampunari)	210
Total	9	665

The district has 12 revenue blocks namely Sivagangai, Kalayarkoil, Ilayangudi, Manamadurai, Tiruppuvanam, S. Pudur, Singampuneri, Tiruppattur, Sakkottai (Karaikudi), Kannankudi, Devakottai & Kallal.

== Economy ==
In 2006, the Ministry of Panchayati Raj named Sivaganga as one of the country's 250 most backward districts out of a total of 640. Consequently, it is one of the six districts in Tamil Nadu currently receiving funds from the Backward Regions Grant Fund Programme (BRGF).

== Industries ==
The first bank in the district was the Bank of India in Periyakottai opened in 1985.

=== Agriculture ===
The vast majority of the workforce is dependent on agriculture (72.8%). In fact, the principal crop of Sivaganga district is paddy while majority of the district has red soil. The other crops that are grown are sugarcane, groundnut, pulses, cereal such as millet, chillies, cotton, and as well as gingelly.

In response, the Tamil Nadu Agricultural University had set up the state's first Red Soil Dryland Research Centre in Sivaganga district.

As of December 2010, the Spices Board is also setting up a new spices park at Sivaganga on an invest of Rs. 180 million. This park is expected to be operational by March 2011. It would be immensely helpful to farmers of chili, turmeric, medicinal plants and tamarind, as the focus would be to export their products. The proposed spices park would establish machinery for cleaning, sorting, grading, packaging, storing, and sterilizing among others. The focus would be to encourage the farmers to plant chili, a leading crop in Ramanathapuram, Sivaganga and nearby districts, as well as turmeric crops. Medicinal plants, being raised in and around the Madurai district, would also get a boost, as it was planned to patronize farmers of medicinal plants.

One of the famous indigenous cow breeds, the Pulikulam cow, has originated from Pulikulam village of Sivagangai district. The Government of Tamil Nadu has also set up a cattle research centre exclusively for these pulikulam cattle breeds for their breeding as well as for the development of that cattle breeds. Bulls of these breeds are mainly used for Jallikattu. Pulikulam cattle research station has been setup near Manamadurai for research purpose.

=== Agro and Mineral Based industries ===
There are several notable industries present in the Sivaganga district. Some of them are listed below:

- Sree Kaderi Ambal Mills Private Limited, Shanmuganathapuram
- Sakthi Sugars Ltd., Sivaganga
- EID Parry India Ltd., Sivaganga
- Britannia Indian Foods Biscuit Factory, Thiruppuvanam
- TAMIN, Sivaganga
- Kaleeswarar Mills, Kalayarkovil
- Tamil Nadu Chemical Products Limited, Karaikudi
- Some Coir Industries Around Sivaganga District
- Hi-Tech Industries, Manalur (Near Thiruppuvanam)
- Ammaiyappar Textile Industry, Sivaganga
- SIDCO Industrial Estate, Sivaganga
- SIDCO Industrial Estate, Karaikudi
- SIDCO Industrial Estate, Kirungakottai (near Manamadurai)
- SIPCOT Industrial Area, Manamadurai

=== Solar power farm ===
Moser Baer Clean Energy Limited (MBCEL) has commissioned a 5 MW grid connected solar PV project at Sivaganga, Tamil Nadu. The project was awarded to Sapphire Industrial Infrastructure Pvt. Ltd., a wholly owned subsidiary of the farm, through a competitive bidding process conducted by the Tamil Nadu Renewable Development Agency. The project is, then, implemented under the 50 MWp generation based incentive scheme of the Ministry of New and Renewable Energy, Government of India.

Sree Kaderi Ambal Mills Private Limited has commissioned 9.6MW grid connected solar PV project at Sivaganga, Tamil Nadu.

== Transportation ==
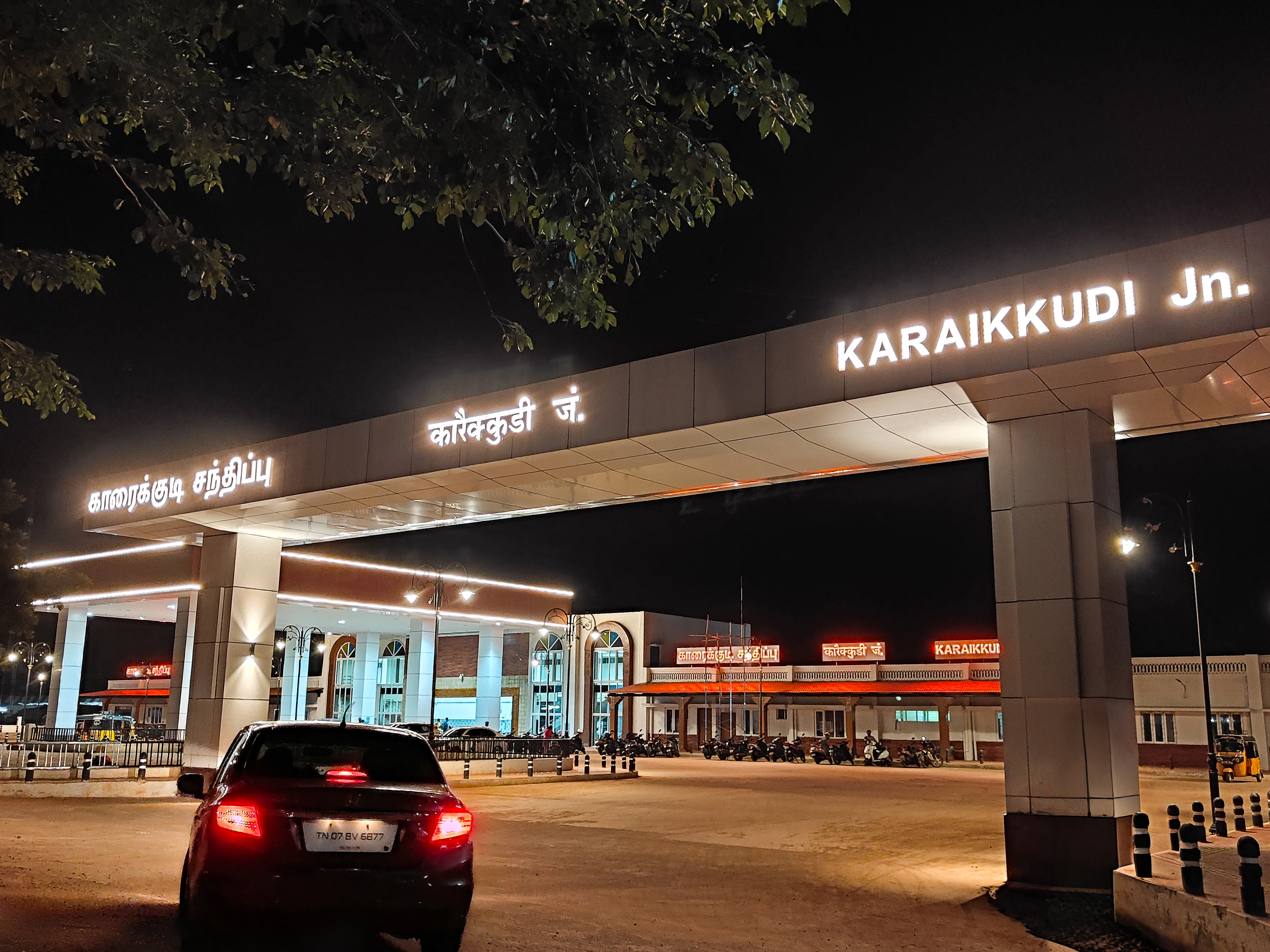
Karaikudi Junction Railway Station

The nearest airport to Sivagangai District is the Madurai International Airport. An unused British-era airfield also exists near karaikudi which is named as chettinad airport and maintained by Tamil Nadu Animal Husbandry Department.

The district is well connected by road network. Some of the notable national highways such as NH-49 Kochi-Madurai-Rameswaram-Dhanushkodi National Highway pass through it and this highway is also a part of Asian Highway network AH-43 and NH-87. The state's first private national highway (Chennai to Karaikudi) originates from this district. It has two railway junctions, namely, Manamadurai Junction and Karaikudi Junction. The district headquarters railway station is located at Sivaganga. It has three goods-handling railway stations: Chettinad (Karaikudi), Melakonnakulam and Manamadurai Junction. Other railway station in the district are Thiruppuvanam, Tiruppachetti, Rajagambiram, Manamadurai Junction, Melakonnakulam, Sivaganga, panangudi, Kallal, Devakottai Road, Karaikudi Junction, Kottaiyur, Chettinad, Kandanur Puduvayal, and Periyakottai.

== Places of interest ==
=== Vettangudi Bird Sanctuary ===
The Vettangudi Bird Sanctuary, located near Tiruppathur, attracts a number of migratory birds such as the white ibis, asian openbill stork and night heron, as well as some endangered species including the painted stork, gray heron, darter, little cormorant, little egret, intermediate egret, cattle egret, common teal, Indian spot-billed duck, pintail and flamingos.

The best season to visit is from November to February.

=== Chettinad ===
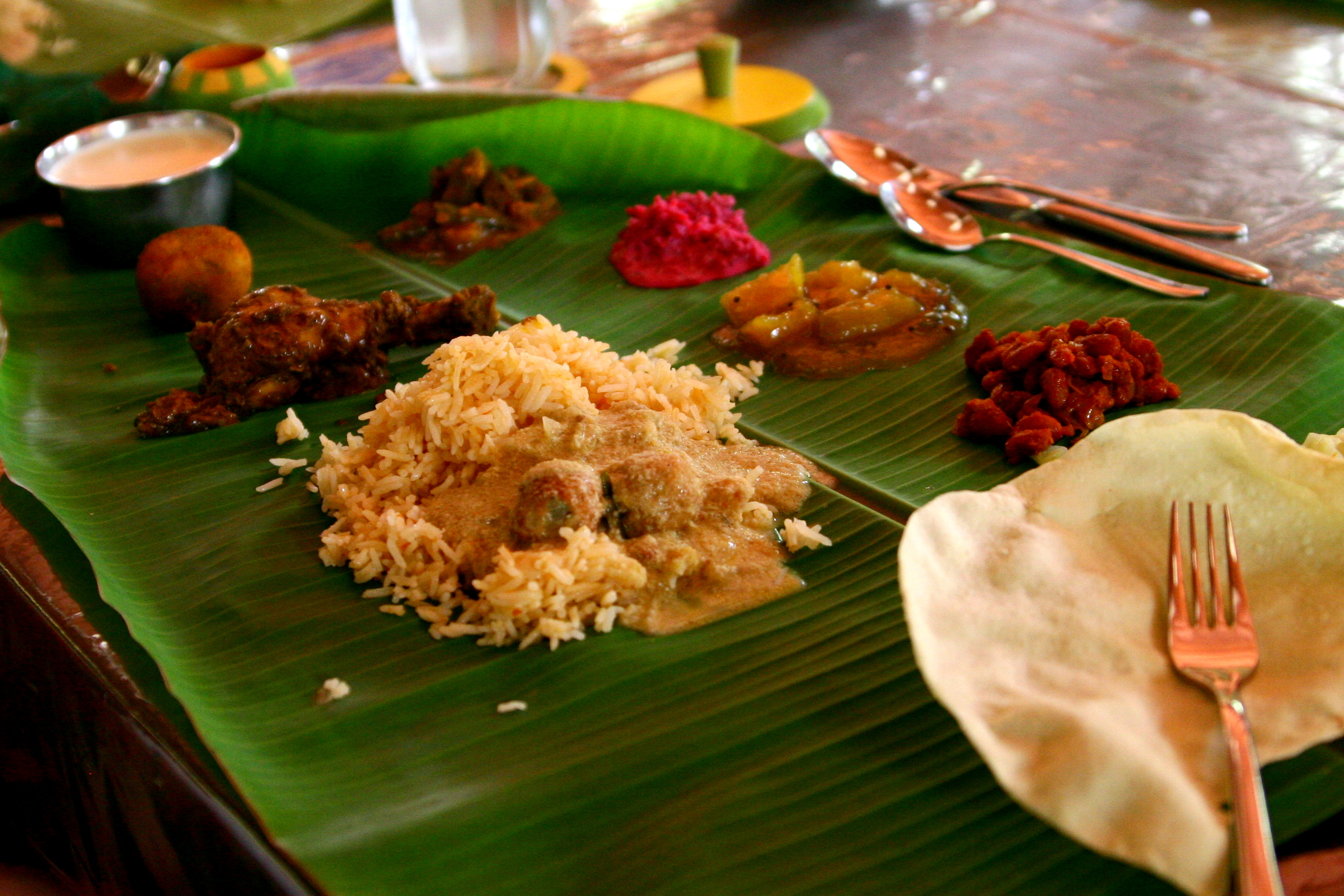
Chettinad cuisine

Chettinad is the homeland of the Nattukottai Chettiars (Nagarathar), a prosperous banking and business community. It is well known for its Chettinad cuisine, which is very hot and spicy. In fact, Chettinad has one of the South Indian cuisines with large number of specialty restaurants. A typical meal will have meat, a large number of courses, and is served on a banana leaf.

Also, the old Chettiar mansions are rich in heritage, art and architecture. The affluence of the Chettiars are shown off in their palatial houses, including one example in Kanadukathan. Carved teak wood doors and frames, hallways laid with the famous Attangudi Silica cast ed sand glass painted tiles, granite pillars, Belgian mirrors and Italian tiles are the norms.

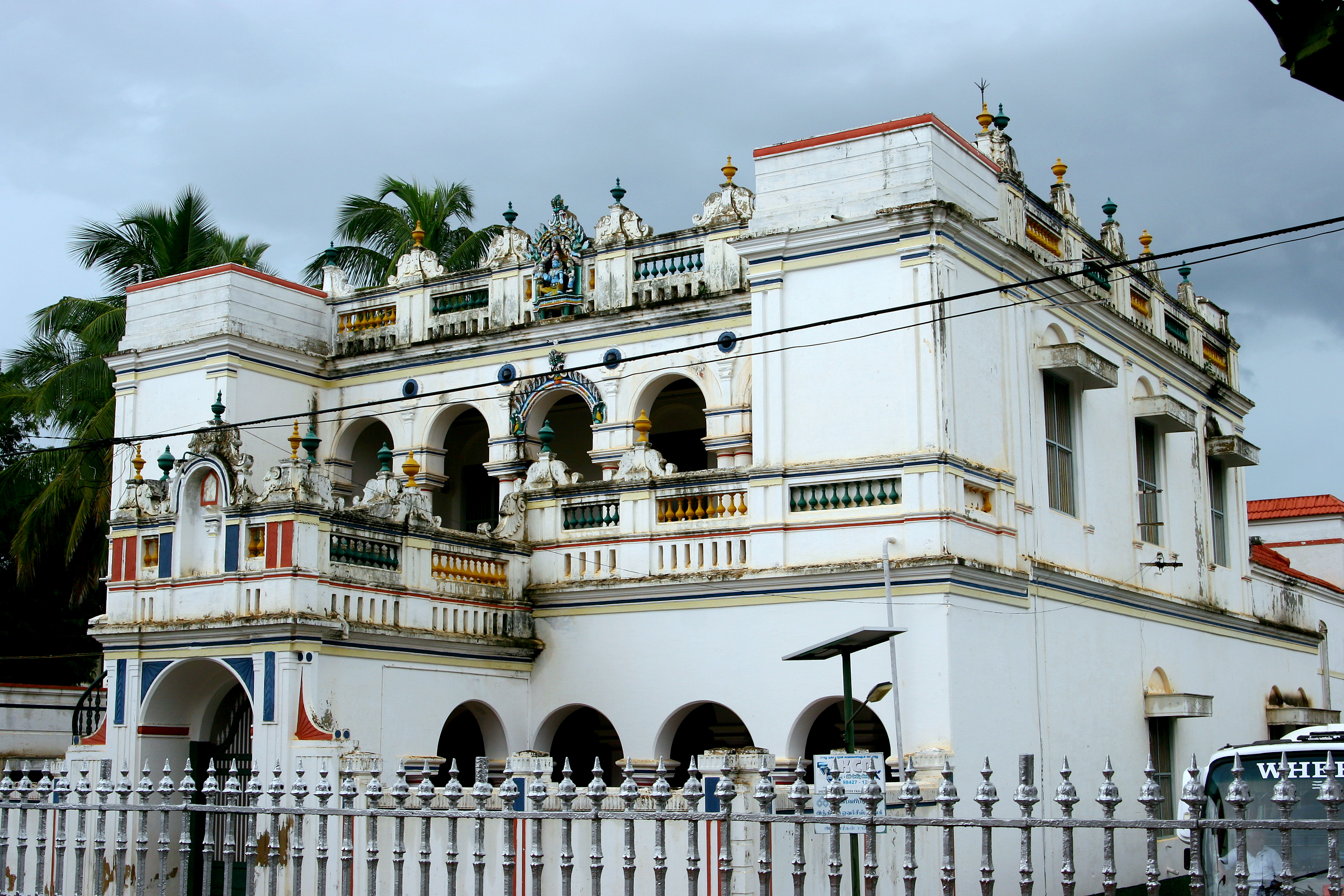
A Palatial house in Chettinad

=== Pandiyan temples ===
There are a few Pandiyan temples. For instance, the Kaleeswara Temple and Karpaka Vinayakar Temple and Sri Sowmiyanarayana Perumal Kovil in Thirukoshtiyur attract large number of pilgrims.

=== Anjanamaar Panch peer dargah ===
This is a shrine of the five soldiers in the troop of Badusha Sulthan Syed Ibrahim shaheed of Ervadi. The dargah is situated at Kannar Street in the Manamadurai – Ilaiyangudi state highway within the panchayat limits of Manamadurai. The annual urus festival marking the martyrdom day of the Panch shuhadas is commemorated on the 17th of the Islamic month of Jamadil Awwal every Hijri year.

=== Keezhadi Museum ===
The archeological excavation and findings from Keezhadi and surrounding areas of Manalur, Kondhagai, Agaram, etc. are showcased for public where morden technologies are deployed for visitors to get a 3 Dimensional view of entire excavation site along with a 20 minutes short flim theatre which explains the history of Tamil diaspora. The entire Museum is built in the Architectural style of Chettinad.

=== Other places of interest ===
- Sivaganga Palace
- Keezhadi Archeological excavation site, Keezhadi.
- Poolankurichi Archeological Inscription Site, Poolankurichi, Tirupathur.
- Thirumalai Cave Temple, Cave Paintings, Samanar Beds and Tamizhi Inscriptions, Thirumalai.
- Elanthakarai Archeological excavation site, Elanthakarai, Kalayarkoil.
- Tamizhl Thai Temple, Karaikudi (portrayed Tamil Language as a Goddess)
- Kamban Tomb, Nattarasankottai (Burial place of Kambar Poet)
- Siravayal Jallikattu.
- Araliparai Jallikattu with unique hillock view gallery and adjacent cave shivan temple.
- Marudhupandiyar Fort, Siruvayal
- Sangarapathi Fort, Amaravathi Pudur (Devakottai)
- Velunatchiyar memorial hall, Sivaganga
- Kaviarasu Kannadasan Memorial hall, Karaikudi
- Sivaganga District Museum, Sivaganga.
- Vallal Alagappa Chettiyar Museum, Karaikudi
- Natchiyappa Swamigal Chettinad Heritage Museum, Karaikudi
- Vintage Maha Museum, Karaikudi (vintage toys)
- Chettinad vintage car and bike Museum, Pillayarpatti
- Sri Malaikoluntheeswarar Temple, Thirumalai
- Shri Thiruvengadamudaiyan Temple, Ariyakudi is popularly known as the Southern Tirupathi by local people, is a 400-year-old temple just 3 km (1.9 mi) from Karaikudi
- Vairava Swmay & Poomalachiyamman Temple, N.Vairavanpatti, Karaikudi – Thiruppathur Road, 15 km (9.3 mi) from Karaikudi
- Pillayarpatti Vinayagar Temple, Pillayarpatti, around 15 km (9.3 mi) from Karaikudi
- Koviloor Temple, Karaikudi
- Maranadu karuppanaswamy Temple, Maranadu
- Manamadurai sri veera Azhagar Temple, Aananthavalli samedha Somanadhaswamy temple
- Ilayangudi Rajendra Chola Eswara Temple
- Nattarasankottai Shri Kannathal Temple
- Sree Sornamoortheeshwarar Temple, Kandadevi
- Kollangudi Vettudaiyar Kaliamman Temple
- Kaleeswarar Temple (Pandia Mannan), Kalayarkovil
- Kannathal Temple, Nattarasankottai.
- Devakottai Nagarasivan Temple
- Kundrakudi Murugan Temple, kundrakudi
- Kollakalaiamman Temple
- Kallal Somasundaram Soundara Nayagi Temple and its Masimaham Festival mostly in the month of February every year.
- Panchabhutheswaram, known as Vedhiyanendal Vilakku, is 5 km (3.1 mi) from Manamadurai. It is on the way to Paramakudi via Elaiyankudi, the route in which Lord Rama went to Sri Lanka to confront Ravanan. This place is known for its hard cut-rock (granite) temple dedicated to Shri Maha Panchamukha Prathyangira Devi. It also houses the big deity of the god.
- Sri Arulmigu Pushpavaneswarar Soundaranayagi amman Temple, Thiruppuvanam −630 611
- Madapuram Badrakali Amman temple Madapuram
- Thayamangalam Muthu Mariyamman temple
- Sarugani Scared Hearts Church
- Thirukoshtiyur Sowmya Narayana Perumal temple
- Piranmalai Kodunkundreeswar Temple with hill trecking, Piranmalai
- Eriyur Malai Marudheeswarar Temple, Eriyur
- Kilapungudi Shivan koil, Uttiradam Nakshatram temple
- Pattamangalam Gurubagavan Temple
- Idaikattur Sacred Heart shrine built in Gothic style in 1800 A.D
- Syed Salaar Sha Shaheed dargah, Pallichandai
- Vediyerendal Sri Angala Parameswari Amman Temple
- Sri Aathi Thiruththalinaathar Temple, Tirupattur
- Singampuneri Sevugaperumal Aiyannar Temple.
- Manomaya Buddha Temple, Paganeri.
- Manamadurai Clay Itracs, Manamadurai town is famous for manufacturing Ghatam musical instruments, clay pots, clay horses, Bricks and other clay itrac.
- Tirupachi Billhooks are icon of Tiruppachetti town, which is famous for manufacturing cast iron BillHook and other Iron related equipments.
- Sivaganga is also famous for its first quality graphite powder.
- Singampunari Coir.

== Villages ==
- Alampattu
- Madagupatti
- Keelappoongudi
- Muraiyur
- Sadurvedamangalam
- Thirumansolai
- Ilayangudi

== Rulers of Sivangangai and history ==
=== Past rulers ===
The Kingdom of Ramnad originally comprised the territories of Ramnad, Sivaganga and Pudukottai of today. Regunatha Sethupathy, or Kilavan Sethupathy, was the seventh King of Ramnad reigned between 1674 and 1710. He came to know of the bravery and valor of Peria Oodaya Thevar of Nalukottai, located 4 kilometres from Sholapuram near Sivaganga. As a result, the King assigned Thevar or Nalukottai a portion of land sufficient to maintain 1,000 armed men.

Vijaya Regunatha Sethupathy became the eighth King of Ramnad in 1710 after the death of Kilavan Sethupathy. The King, then, gave his daughter Akilandeswari Nachiar, in marriage to Sasivarna Thevar, the son of Nalukottai Peria Oodaya Thevar. Afterwards, the King gave Thevar lands as dowry, free of taxation, sufficient to maintain 1,000 men. He also placed him in charge of the fortresses of Piranmalai, Tiruppathur, Sholapuram and Tiruppuvanam, as well as the harbour of Thondi. Meanwhile, Bhavani Sankaran, the son of Kilavan Sethupathy conquered Ramnad territory and arrested Sundareswara Regunatha Sethupathy, the ninth King of Ramnad. Bhavani Sankaran, then, proclaimed himself as the Rajah of Ramnad. He became the tenth king of Ramnad and he reigned from 1726 to 1729.

During his reign, he quarreled with Sasivarna Peria Oodaya Thevar of Nalukottai and drove him out of his Nalukottai Palayam. Consequently, Thevan, the brother of the late Sundareswara Regunatha Sethupathy fled from Ramnad and sought refuge with the Rajah of Tanjore Tuljaji. While Sasivarna Thevar was passing through the jungles of Kalayarkovil, he met a gnani (sage) named Sattappiah, who was performing Thapas (meditation) under a jam bool tree near a spring called 'Sivaganga'. The deposed king prostrated himself before him and narrated all the previous incidents of his life. In response, the Gnani whispered a certain mantra in his ears (Mantra Opadesam) and advised him to go to Tanjore and kill a ferocious tiger which was kept by the Rajah especially to test the bravery of men. Henceforth, Sasivarna Thevar went to Tanjore. There, he became acquainted with Kattaya Thevan a refugee like himself. Satisfied with the good behaviour of Sasivarma Thevar and Kattaya Thevan, wanting to help them to regain the states again, the Rajah of Tanjore ordered his Dalavoy to go with a large army to invade Bhavani Sankaran. Sasivarna Thevar and Kattaya Thevan at once proceeded to Ramnad with a large army furnished by the king of Tanjore. There, they defeated Bhavani Sankaran at the battle of Uraiyur and captured Ramnad in 1730. Thus, Kattaya Thevan became the 11th King of Ramnad.

=== First Rajah Sasivarna Thevar (1730–1750) ===
After becoming the 11th King of Ramnad, Kattaya Thevan divided Ramnad into five parts and retained three for himself. He granted the two parts to Sasivarna Thevar of Nalukottai conferring on him the title of Rajah Muthu Vijaya Regunatha Peria Oodaya Thevar.

=== Second Rajah – Muthu Vaduganatha Peria Oodaya Thevar (1750–1772) ===
Sasivarna Peria Oodaya Thevar died in or about the year 1750. He was succeeded by his only son, Muthu Vaduganatha Peria Oodaya Thevar, who was the second Rajah of Sivaganga. His wife, Rani Velu Nachiar acted as a friend, a philosopher, and a guide to him.

In his reign, Muthu Vaduganatha Peria Oodaya Thevar granted commercial facilities to the Dutch only after the British rejected a similar offer, made to Colonel Heron. In fact, the British' aim was to let the ruler of Sivaganga serve the Nawab, to pay tribute to him, and to dissuade them from establishing relations with foreign powers like the Dutch. However, a two pronged offensive was made by the British. Joseph Smith from the East and Benjour from the West invaded Sivaganga Palayam in June 1772. The country was full of bushes of cockspur thorn, though there were villages and open spaces here and there. Rajah Muthu Vaduganatha Thevar, in anticipation of the invasion, erected barriers on the roads, dug trenches and established posts in the woods of Kalayarkoil.

In the same way on 21 June 1772, the detachment of Smith and Benjour effected a junction and occupied the town of Sivaganga. The next day, the British forces marched to Kalayarkoil and captured the posts of Keeranoor and Sholapuram. Now, Benjour, who is continuing the operations, came into conflict with the main body of the troops of Sivaganga on 25 June 1772. Muthu Vaduganatha Rajah with many of his followers fell dead in that heroic battle. As a result, the heroic activities shown in the battle field by Velu Nachiar is praised by the historians. The widow queen Velu Nachiar and daughter Vellachi Nachiar with Tandavaraya Pillai fled to Virupakshi in Dindigul. Later they were joined by the two able Servaigarars Periya Marudu and Chinna Marudhu.

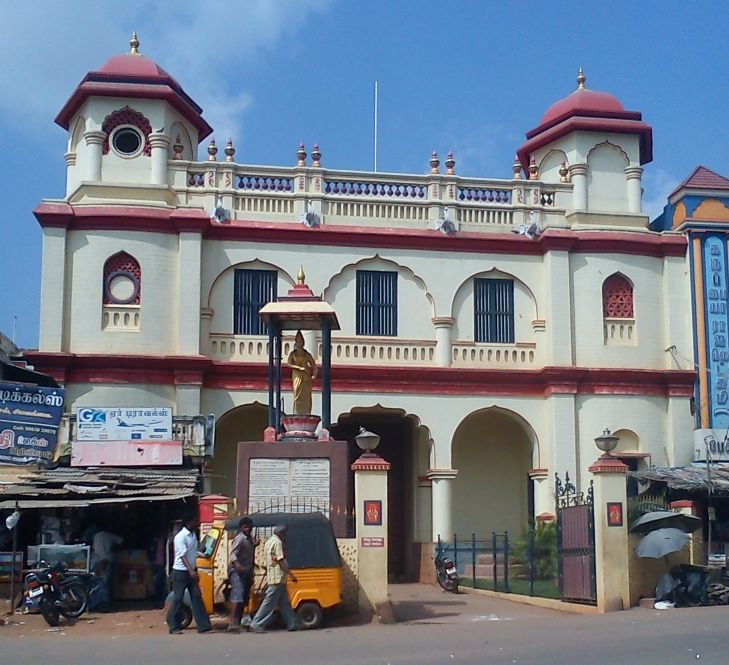
Velu Nachiar Aranmanai (Sivaganga Palace)

Rani Velu Nachiyar and her daughter Vellachi Nachiyar lived under the protection of Hyder Ali at Virupakshi near Dindigul. Her husband, Muthu Vaduganatha Periyavudaya Thevar, was killed in battle with the British and the forces of the Nawab of Arcot. Nachiyar and her daughter left their kingdom and moved to Virupachi near Dindigul to live under the protection of Hyder Ali for eight years. During this period she formed an army and sought an alliance with Gopala Nayaker and Hyder Ali with the aim of attacking the British. In 1780 Rani Velu Nachiyar fought the British and won the battle. When Velu Nachiyar finds the place where the British stock their ammunition, she builds the first human bomb. A faithful follower, Kuyili douses herself in oil, lights herself and walks into the storehouse. Rani Velu Nachiyar formed a woman's army named "udaiyaal" in honour of her adopted daughter – Udaiyaal, who died detonating a British arsenal. Nachiar was one of the few rulers who regained her kingdom and ruled it for 10 more years.

The Queen Velu Nachiar granted powers to Marudhu Brothers to administer the country in 1780. Velu Nachiar died a few years later, but the exact date of her death is not known (it was about 1790).

=== Marudhu brothers (1783–1801) ===
Marudu brothers are the sons of Udayar Servai alias Mookiah Palaniappan Servai and Anandayer alias Ponnathal. They are native of Kongulu street of Ramnad and neither belonged to the family of the ancient poligars, nor to their division of the caste. Servaikaran was the caste title and Marudu the family name.

The Marudu Brothers served under Muthu Vaduganatha Thevar. Later they were elevated to the position of Commanders. Boomerangs are peculiar to India and two forms of this weapons are used in India. One of the weapons is commonly made of wood, commonly known as Valari stick in Tamil. It is a crescent-shaped, one end being heavier than the other, while the outer edge is sharpened. It is said that Marudu Brothers were experts in the art of throwing the Valari stick, and they used it in the Poligar wars against the British. One time, the Marudu brothers, with 12,000 armed men, surrounded Sivaganga and plundered the Nawab's territories. Consequently, the Nawab appealed to the Madras Council for aid on 10 March 1789. In the same way on 29 April 1789, the British attacked Kollangudi, but they were defeated by a large body of Marudu's troops. On the other hand, the Marudhu Brothers were in close association with Veera Pandiya Kattabomman of Panchalankurichi as Kattabomman held frequent consultations with the Marudhus. After the execution of Kattabomman on 17 October 1799 at Kayattar, Chinna Marudhu gave asylum to Kattabomman's brother Oomadurai.

One time, they issued an epoch-making Jumboo Deweepa proclamation to the people in the island of Jamboo, the peninsular South India, to fight against the British whether they were Hindus, Mussalamans or Christians. However, the Marudhu Pandiyars attempt to dislodge the British East India Company from the region was ultimately unsuccessful, and they were defeated. Consequently, Marudu Pandiyan, the popular leader of the rebels, together with his gallant brother Vellai Marudu were executed on the ruins of fort at Tiruppathur in Sivaganga District on 24 October 1801. Marudu brothers were not only warriors who are noted for bravery, but they were very great administrators. During the period from 1783 to 1801, they worked for the welfare of the people and the Sivaganga Seemai was reported as fertile. They constructed many notable temples (i.e. Kalayarkoil) Ooranis and Tanks.

=== Remaining rulers ===
After the many successions of legal heirs ruling the estate, Sri D.S. Karthikeya Venkatachalapathy Rajah succeeded to the estate of late Sri. D. Shanmuga Rajah. He was the former Hereditary Trustee of Sivaganga, Devasthanam and Chatrams consisting of 108 temples, 22 Kattalais and 20 Chatrams. Sri. D.S. Karthikeya Venkatachalapathy Rajah died on 30 August 1986, leaving a daughter named Tmt. Maduranthagi Nachiyar as his heir. At present, Tmt. Maduranthagi Nachiyar is administering the Sivaganga Estate, Sivaganga Devasthanam, and Chatram of Sivaganga Royal Family. Based on the District Gazette 1990 of Ramanathapuram, and the history of Sivaganga maintained by Samasthanam, Sivaganga District has been formed mostly with an area of entire Sivaganga Zamin and part of Ramnad Zamin.

== See also ==
- Mallakottai
- Thirupuvanam
- List of districts of Tamil Nadu
