= Akkur =

Akkur may refer to:

- Akkur, Mayiladuthurai, a small town in Mayiladuthurai district, Tamil Nadu, India
- Akkur, Channapatna, a village in Bangalore Rural district, Karnataka, India
- Akkur, Haveri, a village in Haveri district, Karnataka, India
- Akkur, Ramanagaram, a village in Bangalore Rural district, Karnataka, India
- Akkur, Tirumakudal Narsipur, a village in Mysore district, Karnataka, India
- Akkur, Tiruvannamalai, a village in Thiruvannamalai district, Tamil Nadu, India
