= Shree Kailasha Nathar Temple =

Hindu Temple in Tamil Nadu, India

- Location in Tamil Nadu

Religion
- Affiliation: Hinduism
- District: Sivaganga
- Deity: Shree Kailasha Nathar(Shiva) Kamatchi Ambikai (Kamatchi Ambikai)

Location
- Location: Tiruppuvanam, Tamil Nadu, India
- State: Tamil Nadu
- Country: India
- Interactive map of Shree Kailasha Nathar Temple
- Coordinates: 9.770419°N 78.276089°E

Architecture
- Type: Pandian architecture

Piramanoor Shree Kailasha Nathar Temple is an ancient Shiva temple(now under renovation) in Piramanoor, a village in Tiruppuvanam Taluk, Sivaganga district, Tamil Nadu, India.

Towns Near By Tiruppuvanam (5 km), Madurai (23 km), Sivaganga (24.3 km), Manamadurai(25.2 km).

Other villages in Tiruppuvanam Taluk are Tiruppuvanam, Achangulam, Allinagaram, Chellapanendal, Ilandaikulam, K.Pethanendal

Reason for the Name Piramanoor: Lord Bramha came here to worship the Linga brought by him from the Kailasa Mountain. As per his request, the place is called as Piramanoor(Brahman+Oor).

This Shiva temple is near Tiruppuvanam in Sivaganga district, Tamil Nadu, India. This shrine is in the Pandya region of Tamil Nadu.

== Mythology ==
The lingam worshiped here was brought by the Lord Bramha from Mount Kailash.

== Festivals ==
Thiru Karthikai: In the Tamil month of Karthikai, on Thirukarthikai day the Thalam tree is planted and put in to fire (Chokkappan). Special Pooja is done on every Pradosam day.

== Temple structure ==
The Temple spans an area of about 78 Cents. There are several shrines within this temple complex. The Shiva and Ambal shrines both face the East. The presiding deity Lord Shiva is called as Kailasha Nathar and the Parvathy is called as Kamatchi Ambiga.

Other Deities - Lord Ganapathy, Lord Subramani, Lord Vishnu, Navagraham, Lord Suriyan (Sun), Lord Chandran (Moon) and Lord Viaravan.

== Location ==
Near by Towns - Tiruppuvanam (5 km), Madurai (23 km), Sivaganga (24.3 km), Manamadurai(25.2 km), Kalaiyarkoil (41.4 km), Singampunari (43.6 km).90 km from Madurai. The nearest town Aruppukottai is about 15 km away from this temple.

== History ==
Lord Bramha and Lord Vishnu had a cross fire between them regarding who is most powerful among them. At that time Lord Shiva appears as fire of mountain. Suddenly an oracle is heard "Who is doing quick darshan of Patham (foot) or Sirasu (head) will be the powerful." Immediately God Vishnu takes Varaha (Pig) Avathar and started piercing the earth to see the foot of Lord Shiva. Lord Brahma takes Anna (Swan) avatar and started to fly in the sky to view the head of Lord Shiva. Both could not succeed. Meanwhile, Brahma meets Talampu flower (Screw Pine Flower)which is on the way down from the head of Lord Shiva . Brahma insists Talampu to say a lie, that he (Lord Bramha) has seen the head of Lord Shiva. After much effort, Lord Vishnu realizes and accepts his failure to see Lord Shiva's foot and surrenders to Lord Shiva. But Lord Bramha says that he has seen Lord Shiva's head and brings Talampu (Screw Pine Flower) as witness. Lord Shiva gets angry and curses Bramha and Talampu. So, there is no idol worshiping of Bramha in temples. And Talampu is not used for Shiva poojas.

== Salvation (Saba Vimosanam) ==
Lord Bramha asked Lord Shiva for Salvation - Lord Shiva asks Lord Bramha to go to Pulokam (Earth) and worship him and also says that Talampu (Screw pine flower) should not be used in Shiva Pooja. Lord Bramha goes to Mount Kailas, meets Lord Shiva and Parvathy, brings Linga from Mount Kailas to Pulokam (Earth) and worships. The place of worship of Linga by Brahma is called as PIRAMANOOR (Bramhan+Oor).

== Temple's Speciality ==
Poojas are done twice daily and special poojas on Pradhosam days. During Karthikai month on Thirukarthikai day, Tala tree is planted in the middle and burned - Chokkappanai. (Burning the Screw Pine Tree)
