= Kuthalur =

Kuthalur is a village which is located in Sivagangai District, Tamil Nadu, India, 10 km from Karaikudi towards Sivagangai. The village was called "Chinna Colombo" (Little Colombo) by the surrounding people, as the villagers (especially the Christians) have traveled and worked in Colombo (Sri Lanka) and Rangoon (also known as Yangoon, Capital of Myanmar) prior to India's Independence.

== The community ==
The Village has about 600 families with the head count of over 1000 people.

== The Catholic Church ==
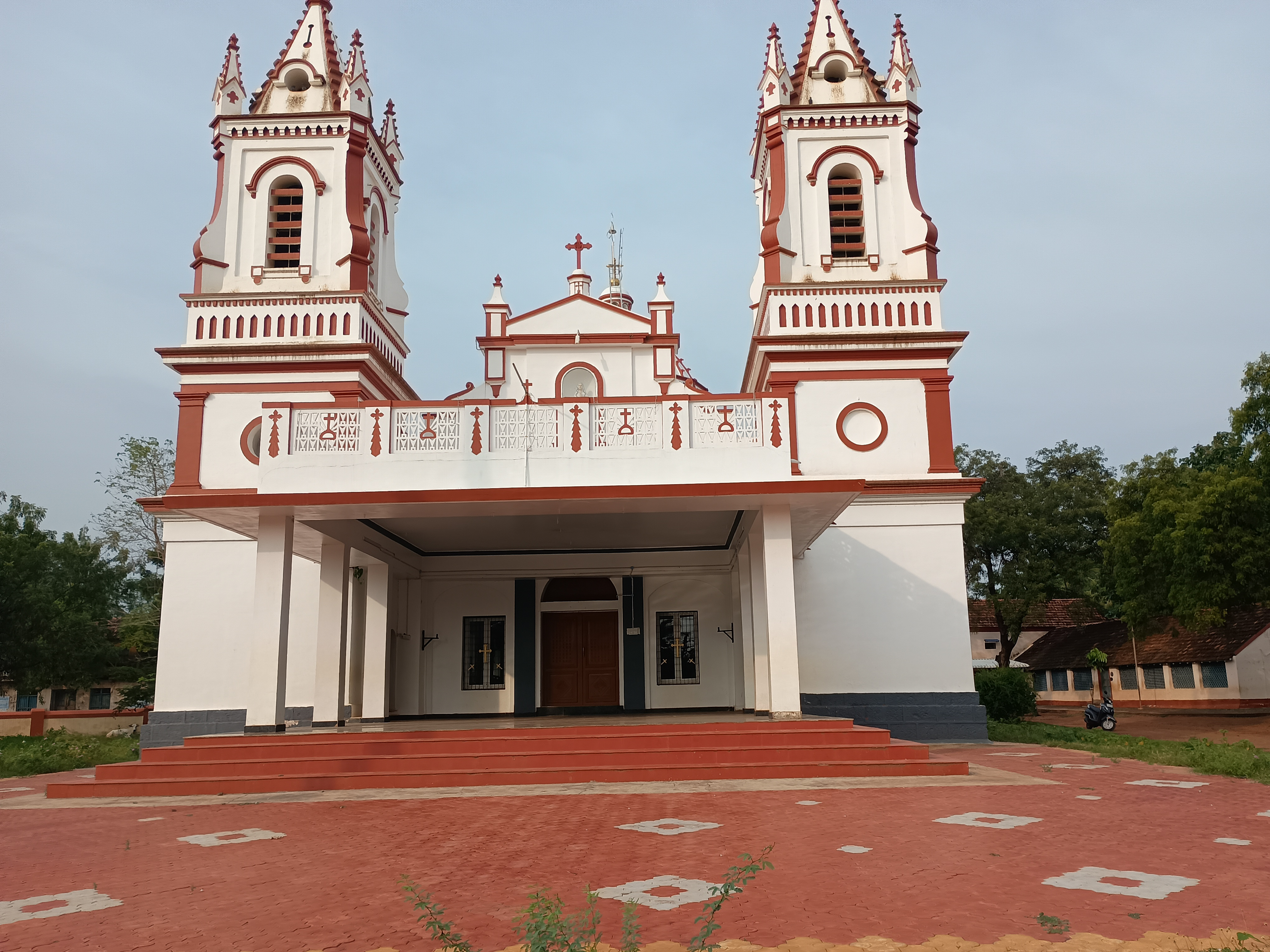
Immaculate Conception Crimson Church, Kuthalur

The Roman Catholic Church dedicated to "Immaculate Conception" is the largest and oldest church in the surroundings which was built in the 1860s by French Missionaries. It is governed by the diocese of Sivagangai. Today, it has crossed 150 years of service and walking with Glory. The church was fully donated by an unknown German Lady and the Mother Mary's Statue in the main altar was imported from Germany.

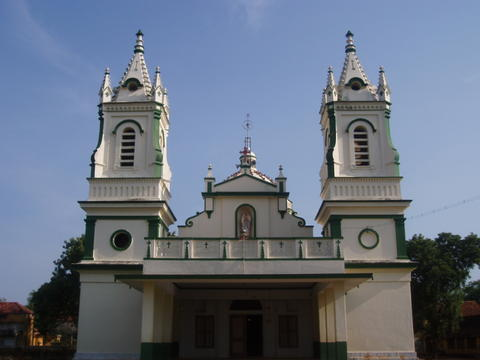
Immaculate Conception Church, Kuthalur

== Church architecture ==
The Church resembles the Gothic architecture of France, which has a main circular dome in the center with two front domes at the entrance of the Church. Also, the Church was constructed with a Main Wing, two side wings along with the Sacristy behind the altar. So, this structure makes the church as + shape in the aerial view. The entire building was made of Brick, Chunnammu Chanthu ( Lime Mortar), Kadukkai ( Palmira Seed Mortar) and with the mixture of Egg White. There are some unconfirmed information that the glasses in the middle dome were imported from Italy.

The inner walls of the church once had unique paintings and due to the damage in the paintings, those walls were repainted with colours.

== The Centennial Jubilee ==
The Centennial Jubilee was celebrated in 1970, in a Grand manner by the villagers through the guidance of the then Parish priest Fr. Saleth for one week. The current entrance hall (mandapam) was constructed during the 100th year jubilee. Also, the church was fully renovated and re-painted during that occasion.

In 1993, Fr. K. Jesuraj, the then parish priest renovated the whole Church. The current Tabernacle & the Calvary Painting behind the altar was done during this Renovation. Fr. Susairaj, the then parish priest, did the major repair work and repainted the Church in 2004.

The Grotto: The grotto dedicated to Our Lady of Lourdes was constructed by Fr. K. V. Paul in April 1955.

== Importance to St. Sebastian ==
Prior to the current Church, the natives of Kuthalur had a small church (Kurusadi) in the middle street dedicated to St. Sebastian. St. Sebastian's Novena has been celebrated in a grand manner in the Second Week of January to thank him for being the patron of the Catholic Community in Kuthalur. Even, today the neighborhood people call IC Church as Sebasthiar Kovil. The local catholic community has the custom to celebrate St. Sebastian's Feast every year with a Car procession. The Church celebrates its annual festival in the last week of May with a car procession & also the villagers celebrates St. Sebastian's festival with a car procession during third week of May.

== Education ==
The Catholicism has served the local community & the neighborhood towards quality education. The current St. Sebastian High School was established on 1933 as a primary School with intention to the serve the poor. It is the oldest school in the region and well known for Quality Teaching, Discipline & Moral. The school has also helped the RC community in Kuthalur to have 100% literacy rate (through the influence of the priests & nuns) and provided foundation to seek for Higher Education up to College level. Today, many people from RC Community are spread across the globe. The school campus also houses the Convent of Immaculate conception since the beginning the 20th century.

== 150-Year Jubilee Celebrations ==
In 2010, Immaculate Conception Church- Kuthalur, celebrated its 150-year jubilee. The local Christian community planned and celebrated the festival in a grand manner by uniting all the sons and daughters of the soil those who have migrated from the village for various reasons to other places and abroad. A committee was formed to renovate the Church and organize the festival. The function was celebrated in May 2011. Regular masses along with weekly masses have been conducted by the Parish Priest, who has a residence inside the church campus.

== Village overview ==
Kuthalur Panchayat comes under the jurisdiction of the Kallal Block of Sivagangai District, Tamil Nadu. The whole village is electrified and it has a Government Civil Supplies Department's Ration shop along with a Post Office . The village is well connected by road with the nearest town of Karaikudi. It has frequent bus services daily to the vicinity.
