= Sankaranyeswarar Temple =

Religion
- Affiliation: Hinduism
- District: Mayiladuthurai district
- Deity: Lord Brahma, Vishnu and Ambal

Location
- Location: Thalaichangadu
- State: Tamil Nadu
- Country: India

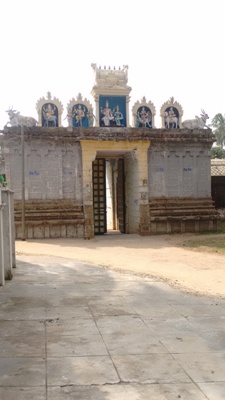
The entrance of the temple

Sankaranyeswarar Temple (சங்காரண்யேஸ்வரர் கோயில்) is a Hindu temple located in the village of Thalaichangadu in the Tharangambadi taluk of Mayiladuthurai district in Tamil Nadu, India.

== Significance ==
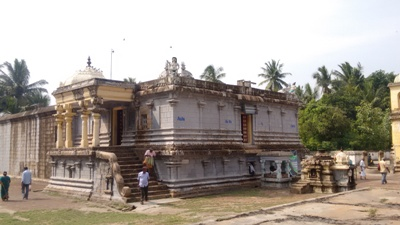

The presiding deity is Shiva as Somaskandar and the consort is Soundara Nayaki. The temple has been praised by Sambandar in the Thevaram. The temple is believed to have been initially constructed by the Chola king Kocengannan and renovated in the following centuries. Vishnu is believed to have worshipped Shiva at this place.

== Shrines ==
The temple is conch-shaped and there are shrines to Brahma, Vishnu and Ambal.
