= Sirappuli Nayanar =

Hindu poet-saint

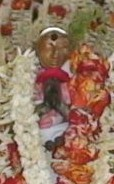

Personal life
- Born: unknown Thiruvakkur, Mayiladuthurai district
- Honors: Nayanar saint

Religious life
- Religion: Hinduism
- Philosophy: Shaivism, Bhakti

Sirappuli Nayanar, also known as Sirappuli (also spelled as Cirappuli, Chirappuli), Sirapuli Nayanar, Sirappuliyar (Chirappuliyar), was a Nayanar saint, venerated in the Hindu sect of Shaivism. He is generally counted as the thirty-fifth in the list of 63 Nayanars. Sirappuli Nayanar is described to have served the devotees of the god Shiva and worshipped the god with various ritual practices.

== Life ==
The life of Sirappuli Nayanar is described in the Tamil Periya Puranam by Sekkizhar (12th century), which is a hagiography of the 63 Nayanars. The Puranam of Sirappuli Nayanar, as his chapter is called in the Periya Puranam is composed of 6 stanzas.

Sirappuli Nayanar was born in Thiruvakkur (Akkur/Aakkoor), Mayiladuthurai district in the Indian state of Tamil Nadu. In the times of Sirappuli Nayanar, Thiruvakkur was part of the Chola kingdom. He was a staunch devotee of Shiva, the patron god of Shaivism. Thiruvakkur was famed for its generous Brahmins, members of the priestly caste. Sirappuli was one of them. Sirappuli's family was traditionally associated with memorizing and chanting the Vedas, one of Hinduism's most sacred scriptures. The Nayanar saint used to donate generously. He is praised as a "munificent giver" and called a "nimbus which rained wealth". He welcomed the devotees of Shiva to his home and prostrated before them. Sirappuli Nayanar spoke sweet words to his guests. He used to feed them and presented them with gifts. Sirappuli regularly recited the Panchakshara mantra. dedicated to Shiva. He performed many yajnas (ritual sacrifices) - including fire sacrifices - in honour of Shiva. The saint is also described to smear vibhuti (sacred ash) on his body. He spent his days serving Shiva and his devotees, and finally attained his divine abode Kailash after death.

The 13th-century Telugu Basava Purana of Palkuriki Somanatha retells the legend of Sirappuli (called Cirupuli in the account) in brief and with some variation.

According to the Hindu spiritual leader Sivananda Saraswati, the legend of Sirappuli Nayanar conveys the greatness of the Panchakshara mantra of Shiva and the glory of Japa, the practice of repeating the name of God or his mantra. The saint is sometimes described to chant the mantra eternally without stopping. Though calling Japa the simplest form of worship, Sivananda exalts it the "highest Yoga" and preaches that one should always recall the name of God, as the great saint did. Sirappuli Nayanar is compared to another Nayanar, Somasi Mara Nayanar, who also embarked on the similar path of bhakti (devotion), employing Hindu rituals like yajnas as well as the Panchakshara mantra to please Shiva.

== Remembrance ==
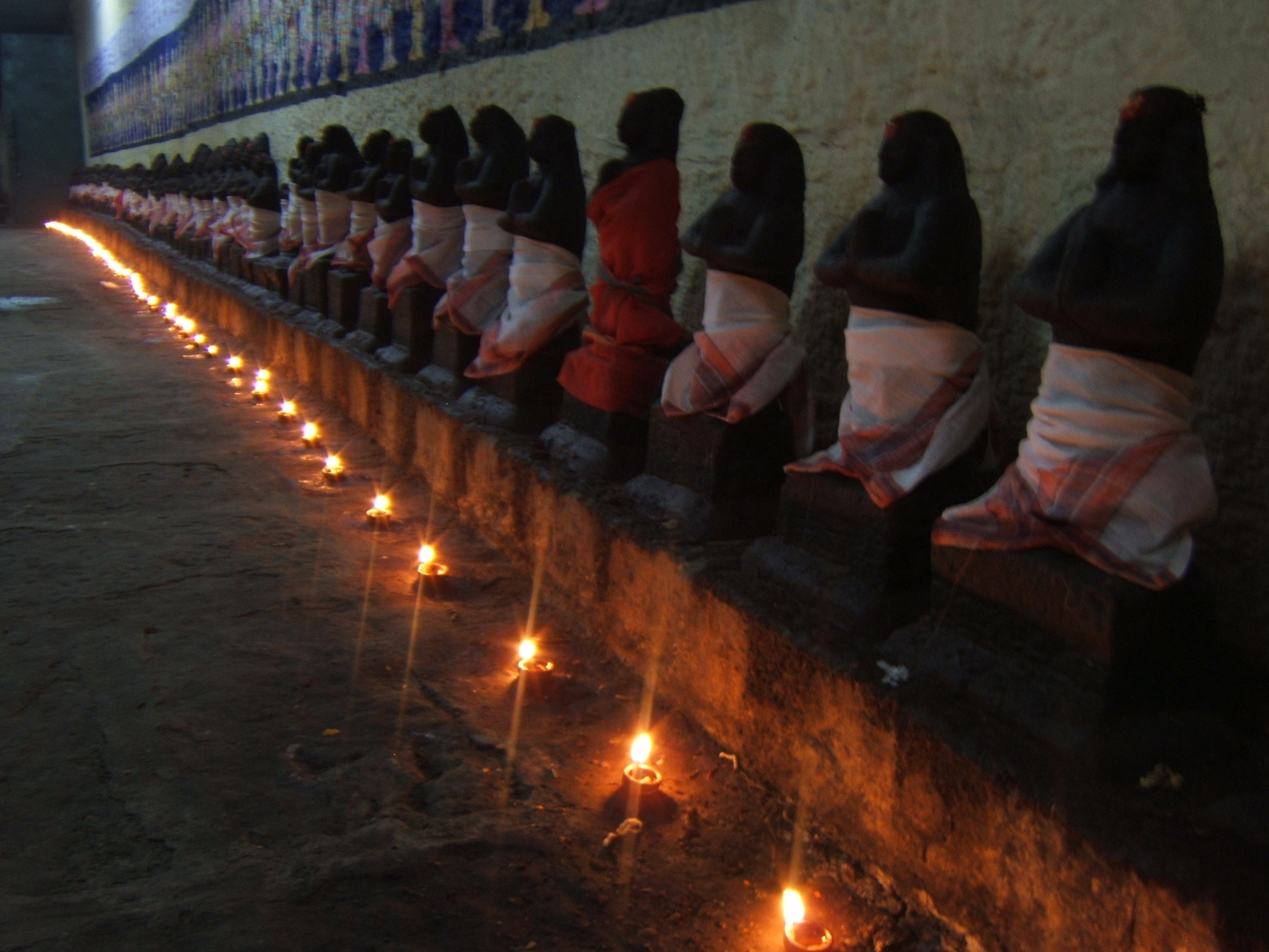
The images of the Nayanars are found in many Shiva temples in Tamil Nadu.

One of the most prominent Nayanars, Sundarar (8th century) venerates Sirappuli Nayanar in the Tiruthonda Thogai, a hymn to Nayanar saints and praising him as generous and famed.

Sirappuli Nayanar is associated with the Sri Thanthondreeswarar temple, the Shiva temple in his home town Thiruvakkur. A shrine is dedicated to him, in the temple. A legend tells that the Nayanar had vowed to feed a thousand devotees every day. Once, Shiva himself came as the thousandth devotee in the feast to complete the thousand. Thus, the icon of the temple is called Ayirathil Oruvar ("one in a thousand"). Some versions of the legend replace Sirappuli with the Chola king and Nayanar Kocengannan, who is credited as the builder of the temple.

The tale of Sirappuli Nayanar is carved in the Airavatesvara Temple, the 12th-century Shiva temple in Darasuram built by the Chola king Rajaraja Chola II. Sirappuli is depicted as a Brahmin, identified by his yagnopavita (sacred thread), giving away gifts to two individuals. An inscription below the scene identifies it as Sirappuliandar.

Sirappuli Nayanar is worshipped in the Tamil month of Karthikai, when the moon enters the Pūrva Ashādhā nakshatra (lunar mansion). He is depicted with folded hands (see Anjali mudra). He receives collective worship as part of the 63 Nayanars. Their icons and brief accounts of his deeds are found in many Shiva temples in Tamil Nadu. Their images are taken out in procession in festivals.
