= Keelaiyur =

- village
- Country: India
- State: Tamil Nadu
- District: Nagapattinam district

Population (2001)
  - Total: 3,139

Languages
  - Official: Tamil
- Time zone: UTC+5:30 (IST)
- Postal code: 611103
- Vehicle registration: TN-51
- Coastline: 0 kilometres (0 mi)
- Nearest city: Nagapattinam
- Sex ratio: 990 ♂/♀
- Lok Sabha constituency: Nagapattinam

Keelaiyur is a village in the Kilvelur taluk of Nagapattinam district, Tamil Nadu, India, between Nagappattinam and Thiruthuraipoondi. Agriculture is the main occupation. It is 20 km from the district capital Nagapattinam and 350 km from the state capital, Chennai.

== Demographics ==
As of 2001 census, Keelaiyur had a total population of 3,139 with 1,577 males and 1,562 females.

== Education ==
As of 2015, Keelaiyur had a Govt Higher Sec School and a Govt elementary school.

== Nearby places ==
- Thalachangadu, 5 km
- Thirupoondi, 5 km
- Vailankanni, 10 km
- Ettukkudi, 7 km
- Thirukkuvalai, 5 km
