= Piramanoor =

Piramanoor (Piramanur / Brahmanur) is a village in Tiruppuvanam block, Sivaganga district in the Indian state of Tamil Nadu. The ancient Shree Kailasha Nathar Temple is situated in this village.

== Geography ==
Nearby towns include:

- Thirupuvanam (5 km)
- Madurai (23.3 km)
- Sivaganga (24.3 km)
- Manamadurai(25.2 km)
- Aruppukkottai(50.3 km)

== Etymology ==
Lord Brahma went there to worship the Linga brought by him from Kailash Mountain. On his request, the place is called Brahmanur (Piramanoor / Piramanur).

== History ==
The pond was brimming with water received from the river Vaigai. Harvest was good as was primary education. Children went there to study. Shri Villiappa Pillai of Piramanur (one of the court poets of Sivagangai) composed a satire titled Panchalakshna tirumugavilasam (The World Secret Revealer), published in 1899. Shri Villiappa Pillai gave his Yettu suvadi (Palm Leaf) to Shri U.V. Saminathaiyer, who compiled the book titled Thiruppuvananatharula in 1904. This narrative piece is full of humour and irony, and deals in about 4500 lines with the conditions of the people suffering in the Great famine of 1876−1878 (Thathu Varuda pancham). The relatives of Sivagangai Kings − Shri Thirukanna Rajendra Uthangan, Thirukanna Thevar lived in this village, near Thirupuvanam.

== Govindharaja Perumal temple ==
According to Thiru Seetha Rama Iyengar (1887-1961), the author of Thiruvarutprabandam, Govindharaja Perumal temple was present in Piramanoor during the early years of the 20th century. No evidence of the temple survives. In his book, he wrote a Pasuram and a Keerthana about the God Govindharaja Perumal.

== Drought and riot ==
Following years of droughts and communal riots, many Brahmin, Chettiar and Nadar families migrated in groups to nearby towns − particularly to Madurai. One notable family is sons of V.Sannasi nadar. They are Mr.V.S.Ayya nadar, Mr. V.S. Chellaiah @ Chellam Nadar (founder of V.S. Chellam soap factory, Madurai − the parent soap company of almost all soap companies in and around Madurai) and his brothers, Mr. V.S. Shanmuga Nadar (founder of Laxmi soap, Madurai) and Mr. V.S. Mariappa Nadar (co-founder of V.S. Thangam soap, Madurai).
