= Thanthondreeswarar Temple, Akkur =

Hindu temple in Tamil Nadu, India

Coordinates: 11.102909°N 79.785929°E

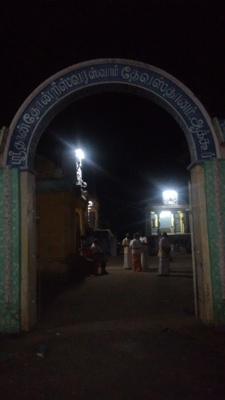
The entrance of the temple

Akkur Thanthondreeswarar Temple(ஆக்கூர் தான்தோன்றீசுவரர் கோயில் ]) is a Hindu temple located at Akkur in Mayiladuthurai district of Tamil Nadu, India. The presiding deity is Shiva. He is called as Thanthondriappar. His consort is known as Valnedunkanni.

== Sthala Puranam ==
It is believed that the local Chola King was suffering with a strange disease which was not curable by doctors and Lord Shiva appeared to him in a dream and asked him to feed 1000 people for 48 days. The King started the task of feeding and realised at the end of the time period that though 1000 seats were placed only 999 were occupied every day. Realising the missing seat, the King prayed to Lord Shiva to resolve the issue and realised on the last day that all 1000 seats were occupied, wherein the latter appeared in the form of old man. When the king questioned the old man about his appearance, the old man counter-questioned Yaarukku oor (whose place?), instead of replying. King realising his mistake after discovering the old man as Lord Shiva Himself, dug up the mound, and found a Lingam where he built a temple. The Lingam is understood to have a scar indicating the strike when the digging of mound was done. This has also resulted in King also getting cured with Shiva presenting Himself as one of the thousand and being called as Aayirathil Oruvan (one in a thousand). The word “Yaarukku oor” by old man got diluted into Aakkoor.

There is one more belief that Kochchenga Cholan was suffering from a disease and a voice from heaven guiding him to find a place having three sthala vrikshams and to build a temple in that area which can result him in getting cured. The king came across an old Brahmin while searching the place who enquired about the former's problem. When the King shared his issue with the Brahmin ( a Vinayakar Originally ) who later suggested him to drown himself in temple tank for one nazhigai than the temple will become holier than Kasi. After the king performed the act, he found himself in a place where Kondrai, Betel (paaku) and Vilvam trees grew. The king was cured of his disease after he built the temple. The place being in the mound was named Thanthondri Maadam ( maadam meaning place in an elevated area ).

== Significance ==
It is one of the shrines of the 275 Paadal Petra Sthalams - Shiva Sthalams glorified in the early medieval Tevaram poems by Tamil Saivite Nayanars Tirugnanasambandar and Tirunavukkarasar.

== Literary mention ==
Tirugnanasambandar describes the feature of the deity as:

நன்மையா னாரணனும் நான்முகனுங் காண்பரிய

தொன்மையான் தோற்றங்கே டில்லாதான் தொல்கோயில்
இன்மையாற் சென்றிரந்தார்க் கில்லையென்னா தீந்துவக்குந்

தன்மையாற் ஆக்கூரிற் றான்றோன்டி மாடமே.

== Sirappuli Nayanar ==
Sirappuli Nayanar is associated with this temple. A shrine is dedicated to him, in the temple.
