= Kathama Nachiar =

Kathama Nachiar (died 1877) was the Rani (Queen) of Sivagangai, a zamindari estate in the Madras Presidency of India. After an extended succession struggle, she ruled Sivagangai from 1863 to 1877. A patron of the arts and literature, she supported the development of many temples.

== Life ==
Kathama Nachiar was the daughter of Gauri Vallabha, the Istimirar Zamindar of Sivagangai, and his third wife Velu Nachiar. Gauri Vallabha died in 1829 without male heirs. For three decades his older brother's descendants successfully claimed his title and estate. They faced repeated contestation - "from one of Gauri Vallabha's daughters and her son; a surviving widow; three daughters together; and a daughter alone". Though Hindu law dictated primogeniture, the legal situation was complicated by argument over the status of the wives and concubines of Gauri Vallabha and his father. Supported in her litigation by George Frederick Fischer, a local cotton merchant, Kathama eventually succeeded in securing an 1863 Privy Council decision which granted her the title.

Kathama's installation ritual was described by John Shortt, a colonial medical officer, veterinary surgeon and ethnographer. She did not attempt to assert herself as a fully autonomous ruler. In 1864 she granted Fischer a ten-year lease for the entire zamindari. After Fischer's death in 1867, his son Robert inherited the lease, but made over the lease the following year to Venkatasami Naik, the Madurai Collectorate's Sheristadar (Chief Secretary). Kathama objected to the transfer, but lost her court suit against Venkatasami on appeal. Though Venkatasami was forced to relinquish his government post, he made himself patron to Dorasinga Tevar, the son of Gauri Vallabha's first wife's daughter and a rival claimant to the title.

== Photograph ==
A painted photograph of Kathama survives in an album in the Pitt Rivers Museum, amongst material donated to the Anthropological Society of London by John Shortt.
