= Thalachangadu =

Thalachangadu Thalaiudaiyavar Kovil Pathu
- Village
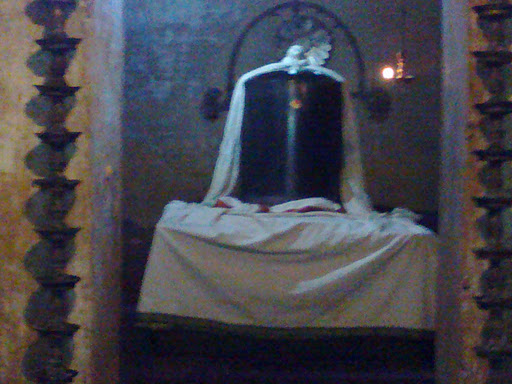
- Sangaraneswarar

- Location in Tamil Nadu, India Thalachangadu (India)
- Coordinates: 11°07′27.8″N 79°47′40.0″E
- Country: India
- State: Tamil Nadu
- District: Mayiladuthurai
- Sub-cort: Mayiladuthurai
- Taluka: Tharangambadi

Area Thiru + thalai + sangu + gadu
  - Total: 2 km^{2} (0.77 sq mi)

Languages
  - Official: Tamil language
- Time zone: UTC+5:30 (IST)
- PIN: 609107
- Telephone code: 04364
- Vehicle registration: TN-82
- Nearest city: Akkur
- Lok Sabha constituency: Mayiladuthurai
- Vidhan Sabha constituency: Poombuhar
- Climate: Tripical (Köppen)
- Website: http://Mayiladuthurai.nic.in

Thalachangadu is a historical village located in Mayiladuthurai district, Tamil Nadu, India, on the bank of the Cauvery River. Its southern boundary is the Rajendran Channel, on the north side is the Cauvery River, on the east side is MelaPerumPallam and on the western side is Natraja Pillai Chavadi.

== Religion ==
In Thalachangadu there is a big Siva temple, named Sangaraneswarar. This is one of the temples prized by Thirugnanasambanthar in Thevaram.

There is another Siva temple named Dhaxenapurieswar-Agliyandeswri and this temple is famous for the god of Satarn (Sanieswar) who is facing to the west side. Saturn lies in the north east corner of the temple.

Naanmadiya Perumal temple is under the presiding Deity is the Hindu god Vishnu. It is one of the Divya Desams, the 108 temples of Vishnu revered by the 12 poet saints, or Alwars. The Lord of this Divyadesa temple is praised in the Mangalasasanam hymn of Tirumangai Azhwar. In this Divyadesa temple, Perumal appears with crescent moon on His head as Lord Shiva facing east and in a standing form. Hence, the name of Perumal is Nanmadhia Perumal and Chandra Shaba Harar, one who released Chandra from his curse. The Vimana-tower above the sanctum sanctorum is known as Chandra Vimanam. Those facing adverse aspects of planet Moon are advised to come to this temple and worship Lord and Mother for relief.
