= Ilaiyangudi =

Ilayangudi
- Municipality
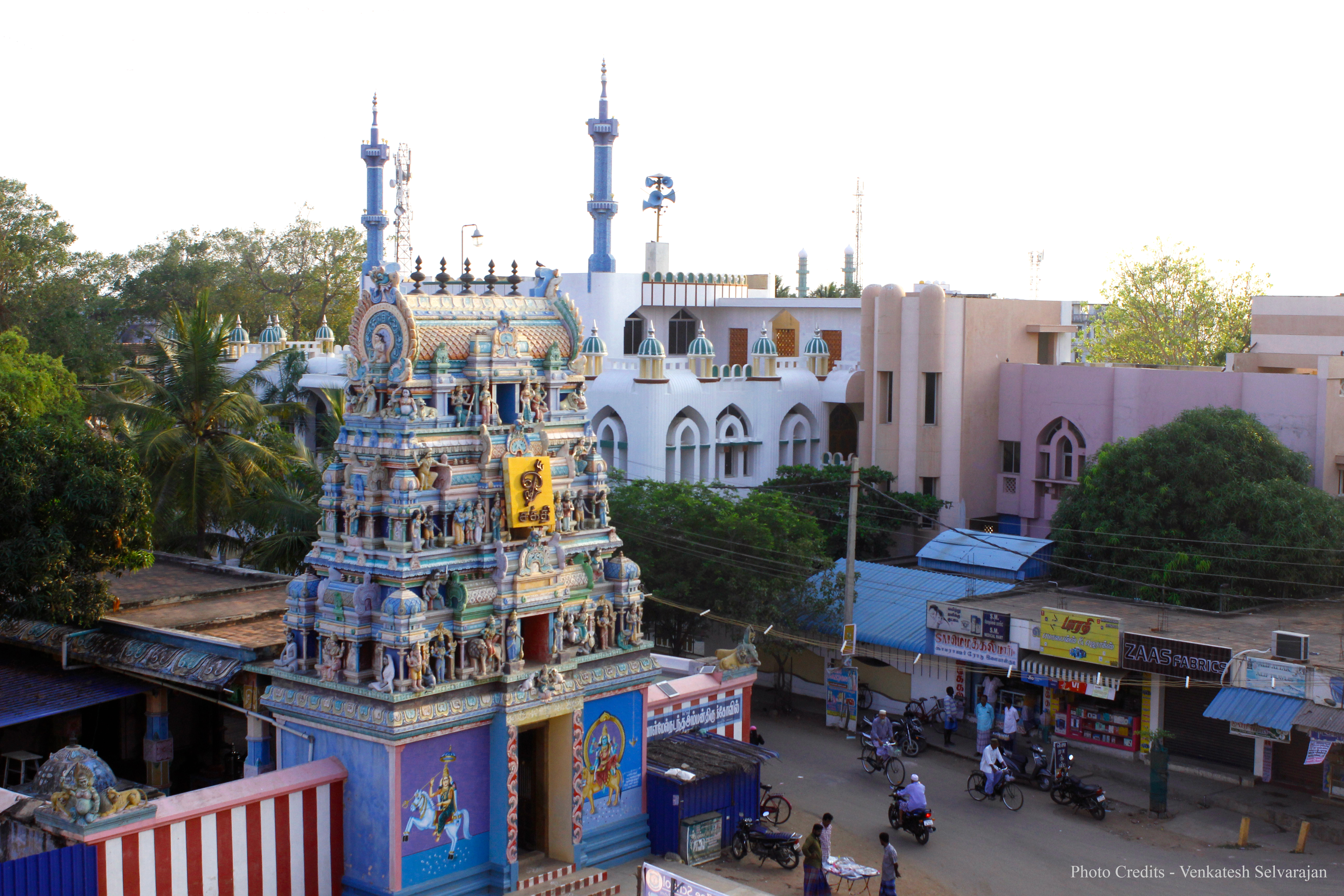
- Arulmigu Vaalmel Nadantha Amman Kovil and INPT Mosque

- Location in Tamil Nadu, India
- Coordinates: 9.63°N 78.63°E
- Country: India
- State: Tamil Nadu
- District: Sivaganga

Government
  - Type: Municipality
- Elevation: 42.6 m (140 ft)

Population (2011)
  - Total: 24,767

Languages
  - Official: Tamil
- Time zone: UTC+5:30 (IST)
- PIN: 630702
- Telephone code: 914564
- Vehicle registration: TN 63 (Sivagangai RTO)
- Sex ratio: 1:1.082 ♂/♀

Ilaiyangudi (or "Ilayangudi") is a town in Sivaganga district, Tamil Nadu state, India. It is the center of government for the surrounding tehsils. The town has a predominant Tamil Rowthers population. The Tamil Muslim community was traditionally engaged in business. Bazaar (Kadai Theru) is the central business district.

== Location ==
Ilaiyankudi is located at 9.63°N 78.63°E. It has an average elevation of 43.6 m (143 ft). The town lies in the southern part of Tamil Nadu state, approximately 20 kilometres (12 mi) from the Palk Strait. Its nearest city is Paramakudi around 10 kilometers and Madurai, approximately 70 kilometres (43 mi) to the northwest. The Vaigai River is located approximately 10 kilometres (6.2 mi) southwest of the town, flowing in a south-easterly direction towards the Palk Straight. The town is located near the junction of the state roads 29 and 34, linking Paramakudi to the south and Manamadurai, Sivagangai and Kalayarkovil to the north.

== History ==
Ilaiyangudi is first recorded in the 3rd century BCE. In the 1st century BCE, followers of the Jain faith reached Tamil Nadu. Iconography of Mahavira (the ascetic Jain monk) from this time is found in Ilaiyangudi. for instance, a Mahavira statue is found outside the main Hindu temple. In general, Buddhist iconography is not found in Ilaiyangudi. However, the town's public water tank is called the therar oorani. The similar word thearar is a Tamil term for a Buddhist monk.

The Rajendra Chola Eswara Temple, the main Hindu temple in Ilaiyangudi, was built by King Rajendra Chola I (1012 CE – 1044 CE). The Manju Puthur Chettiyars, the Chettiyars of Ilayangudi were a Jain clan who converted to Shaivism. In Ilaiyangudi, there is an edict engraved on stone which dates to the 11th century.

The 63 nayanmars were Hindu saints of Tamil Nadu who were devoted to Shiva. The fourth was Ilayankudi Maranar. He lived in the 12th century CE and as his name suggests, he was born in Ilayangudi.

In the 15th century CE, a larger population of Muslims migrated to Ilaiyangudi from nearby areas. Approximately forty families left more southern regions due to drought and moved north and settled on the outskirts of Ilaiyangudi at Thuraiyan Pacheery where potable water was available. (The area is now located near the main bazaar on Kadai Road.)The Ilaiyangudi Muslims are Rowthers (traditionally Landowners and cavalry people).

== Geography ==
=== Hydrology ===
Ilaiyangudi lies in the southern part of the Kaveri (Cauvery) river delta. It is in a drought prone area. However, in the district there are two aquifers, the Gondwana and the Cuddalore aquifers. A water reservoir (samuthram) northwest of the town is filled from the Valasaikattu Kanmai, a branch from the Vagai River. The monsoon rain also helps fill the reservoir. The ancient Thevoorani is a small lake in the centre of the town.

=== Geology ===
The types of rock about Ilaiyangudi are approximately 60 percent sedimentary rock and 40 percent igneous rock. There is sandstone, laterite, charnockite, gneiss and granite covered by thick alluvium.

=== Climate ===
Ilaiyangudi has average minimum temperatures around 27 degrees Celsius and average maximum temperatures around 35 degrees Celsius.

== Demographics ==
At the 2011 Census of India, the population of Ilaiyangudi was 24,767. 12,319 people were female. Males numbered 12,448. There are 990 females for every 1,000 males. Children under six years of age make up 10.73 percent of the population. The literacy rate in the town is 88.94 percent which exceeds the state average of 80.9 percent. 84.33 percent of women are literate. Male literacy is 93.03 percent.

=== Religion ===
Religious census
Religion	Percent(%)
Muslim	70%
Hindu	27%
Christian	3%

The 2011 census of India found in Ilaiyangudi, 70 percent of residents are Tamil Muslims, 27 percent are Hindu, and 3 percent are Christians, both Catholic and Protestant.

The town has four main Muslim groups (jamath) based on their members' occupation. The Ilaiyangudi Nesavu Pattadai (INP) was founded in the mid 16th century, representing textile weavers. The Mela Pattadai represented bullock cart drivers. The Kodikka Pattadai (Salai Hanafi Jamath) and the Salaiyur Nesavu Pattadai (Salai Shaafi Jamath) represented textile weavers.

The first mosque in Ilaiyangudi was built in approximately 1450 CE. It was called the Keela Pallivasal. Further construction was made on the west side of the mosque in 1744, the Mela Pallivasal are all Hanafi mosque. While one Shafi mosque was built in 1775 CE. The INP mosque was built in 1816 CE.

== Administration ==
There are 51 villages around Ilayangudi which falls under Ilayangudi town panchayat.

== Governance ==
The local governance of Ilaiyangudi is conducted under the Panchayati system. The town is divided into 18 wards. Elections for representatives of the wards are held every five years. The Ilaiyangudi panchayat provides water and sewerage amenities to nearly 6,000 residences and builds roads within the town limits. The services are funded by taxes paid to the panchayat.

Ilaiyyangudi is a center of governance (tehsil) for the town itself, an area of 16.4 km^{2}, and for many surrounding villages.

The Ilaiyangudi assembly constituency is part of the Sivaganga Lok Sabha.

In 1965, under a Delimitation of Parliamentary and Assembly Constituencies Order, during the election of the 4th Lok Sabha, Ilaiyangudi became the 197th constituency of the Tamil Nadu state legislative assembly.

In 2008, under a Delimitation of Parliamentary and Assembly Constituency Order, the Ilaiyangudi assembly constituency was merged with Manamadurai.

== Government Services ==
Government Office in Ilayangudi
No	Office	Location
01	Police Station	Keelayur Colony, Ilayangudi.
02	Town Panchayath Office	Sivagangai Road, Kanmaikarai, Ilayangudi
03	District Magistrate Court	Near Taluka Office, Ilayangudi
04	Sub-registar office	Paramakudi Road, Ilayangudi.
05	Taluka Office	Sivagangai Road, Ilayangudi
06	Traffic Police Station	Kamarajar Road, Ilayangudi.
07	Village Administrative Office	Maranayannar Street, Ilayangudi.
08	Government Veterinary hospital	Near Union Office, Ilayangudi
09	Post Office	Azad Street, Ilayangudi.
10	Sub-Treasury Office	Near Taluka Office, Ilayangudi
11	Union Office	Sivagangai Road, Ilayangudi
12	Tamilnadu Electricity Board (TNEB)	Near Taluka Office, Ilayangudi.
13	Government Library	Bus Stand Road, Ilayangudi.

== Cuisine ==
Ilayangudi is very famous for Parotta, a Subcontinental layered flatbread made from Maida or Atta. Apart from Parotta, the town also has Biriyani, Fastfood centers and Idly shops, bakeries, Tea shops. Paniyaram

== Literature ==
People from Ilaiyangudi have contributed to Tamil literature. However, few works of Ilaiyangudi authors have been preserved as printed works.

Katchi Pillaiyammal was the first published poet of Ilaiyangudi. Her father was Lukman Rowther, a philosopher. Pillaiyammal's main theme was wisdom.

Seeniaabil Rowther wrote Singara Vazhi Lavani about Ilaiyangudi. It was published in 1918 by Sivagangai Sri Kala Press.

=== Mathura Kavi ===
Thenmalaikhan Mathura Kavi Batcha Pulavar (1860 CE – 1930 CE) lived in Ilaiyangudi and was honoured with a parcel of land (a pattayam) by the Zamindar of Sivaganga. He was a descendant of the Noordeen family. A building in Ilaiyangudi, built by Mathura Kavi's grandson, and a street in Ilaiyangudi are named after Mathura Kavi.

In 1892 CE, Mathura Kavi wrote a collection of poems in praise of Nagoor Meeran Shahib. The first edition was published by Mohamed Samadani Press (Ibrahim Rowther) in Karaikal. The second edition was published in 1963 CE by Quraniya Press (Abdul Jabbar) in Madurai. Also in 1892 CE, the Madurai Pandiyan Press published his Pillai Thzamil Collection. In them, he narrates the childhood events of Nagore Shahul Hamid (1490 CE – 1579 CE), an Islamic mystic saint and preacher in Tamil Nadu. A second edition was published in 1963 CE by Quraniya Press, Madurai. The collection includes four short poems, Kalithurai, Nagai Patthu, Nagai Kochagam and Nagai Thiruvasagam.

His other works include Arul Mani Malai, poems venerating Karaikal Kadir Mohideen. Karaikal had published Mathur Kavi's Hazarat Shahu Ali Masthan Oli Shahib poems at the Mohamed Samadani Press. A second edition was published by Quraniya Press in 1963. His Thirukarana Vannangal poems, and the Deen Vilakka Vannam poems dedicated to Hazarat Syed Ibrahim Sahid of Ervadi, were published by the Karaikal Mohamed Samadani Press in 1895 CE and a second edition published by Quraniaya Press in Madurai, also in 1963. His book, Pancha Rathina Vannangal was not published but remnants of handwritten copies were found in his house and published by 1963 by Quraniya Press. In 1922, Kuthubu Mani Malai, dedicated by Mathura Kavi to Mohideen Abdul Kadir Jailani was published by Thubash T. K. Mohamed Ibrahim of Abiramam-Natham, a relative of Mathura Kavi and a representative of the Manonmani Vilasam Press in Madurai.

== Educational institutions ==
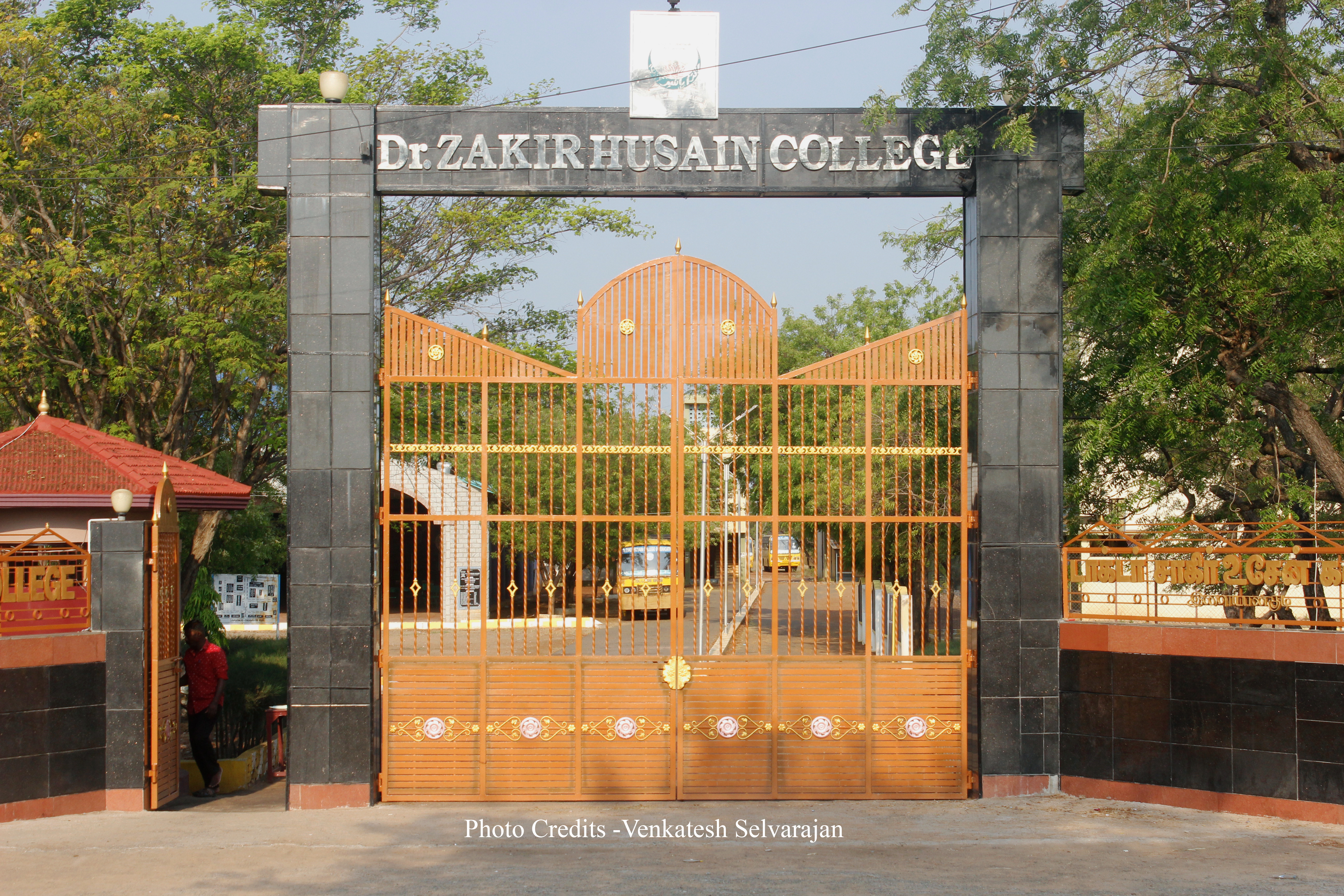
Dr.Zahir Hussain College, Ilayangudi . The College is counted among the top-rated Colleges in Tamil Nadu with an excellent academic track record Source: https://www.icbse.com

- Dr. Zakir Hussain College (1970).
- Ilayangudi Higher Secondary School (1914).
- St. Anne's Matric Higher Secondary School, Mallipattinam, Ilayangudi.
- Rahmanniya Elementary School (1914), Ilayangudi.
- Government Girls' High School, Ilayangudi.
- Melapallivasal Girls' Higher Secondary School, Ilayangudi
- INP Matriculation School, Ilayangudi.
- Iqra Matriculation School, Ilayangudi.
- Hamidiyya Higher Secondary School, Salaiyur, Ilayangudi.
- IILM (Ilayangudi Institute of Learning and Monitoring) Elementary School.
- Haji K. K. Ibrahim Ali Higher Secondary School, Pudur, Ilayangudi.
- Muslim Nalvali Abiviruthi School, .
- Al Ameen Buhari Technical Institute, Ilayangudi.
- Arabic Madarasa, Pudur Road, Ilayangudi.

== Notable people ==
- Allama Karim Gani – Academic, Politician and independence activist. He was an associate of Subhas Chandra Bose.
- Mahendran, one of the greatest film makers of Tamil cinema was born in ilayangudi .
- Ilayankudi Maranar, is a Nayanar saint, venerated in the Hindu sect of Shaivism. He is generally counted as the fourth in the list of 63 Nayanars.
- Khan Bahadur Dubash Kadir Rowther – Zamindar of Pandalgudi
- M.K.M. Abdul Kadir Rowther – Tamil poet and Mirasdar
- E. A. Siddiq – Indian Agricultural Scientist, Padma Shri recipient
- A. P. Mohamed Ali (born 15 June 1946), officer in the Indian Police Service. He received a doctoral degree in Criminology from University of Madras
- P. N. Abuthalib, Joint Secretary of Indian Union Muslim League. He was an associate of the politician, Muhammad Ismail Sahib.
- Vanjoor M. Peer Mohamed (1914 – 1987), a statesman, administrator, businessman and philanthropist. He provided the Dr. Zakir Hussain College main building and was a trustee of INP Jamath.
- T. K. A. Dewan Mohamed (1938 – 1986), the first Indian Administrative Service officer from Ilaiyangudi. He held the positions in the Government of Tamil Nadu of Collector and Additional Chief Secretary.
- T. K. S. Mohamed Iqbal, a member of the Indian Police Service. Iqbal died on 21 May 1991 in the assassination bombing that killed Rajiv Gandhi.
