= Ilayangudi pudur =

Village in India

Pudur
- Town
- Interactive map of Pudur
- Coordinates: 9.6465155°N 78.6247796°E

Pudur is a small town in Ilayangudi Taluk, Sivagangai District of Tamil Nadu, India. It is located on State Highway 28 connecting Karaikudi and Ilayangudi.

== Religion ==
Pudur is home to two mosques for men and a mosque for women, as the town is primarily populated by Muslims.

== Schools ==
There are two government primary schools, two private primary schools, and a higher secondary school (Haji K. K. Ibrahim Ali Higher Secondary School) with a total population of around 1000 students from more than 25 villages around Pudur.
