= Somasi Mara Nayanar =

Hindu poet-saint

Personal life
- Born: 7th century CE; Thirumakalam
- Honors: Nayanar saint,

Religious life
- Religion: Hinduism
- Philosophy: Shaivism, Bhakti

Somasi Mara Nayanar, also known as Somasi Maranar, Somasi Marar, Somasimarar and Somasira Nayanar, is a Nayanar saint, venerated in the Hindu sect of Shaivism. He is generally counted as the thirty-third in the list of 63 Nayanars. He is also called Marar, Maran and Mara Nayanar, names he shares with Ilayankudi Mara Nayanar. The two Nayanars are generally differentiated by the prefixes "Somasi" and "Ilayankudi". He was a contemporary and devotee of Sundarar (7th century CE).

== Hagiographical account ==
The life of Somasi Mara Nayanar is described in the Periya Puranam by Sekkizhar (12th century), which is a hagiography of the 63 Nayanars. He is regarded as a historical figure, who was a contemporary of one of the most prominent Nayanars, Sundarar and is dated to the 7th century.

Somasi Mara Nayanar was a Brahmin, member of the priest caste. He was a temple priest. He was born in Thiruvambar (also known as Ambur, Ambar, Tiruvambur), currently known as Ambal, Nagapattinam district in the Indian state of Tamil Nadu.

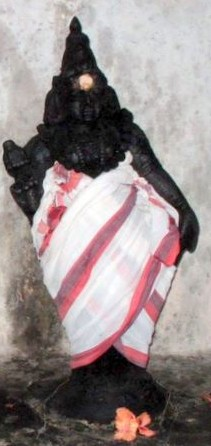
Somasi Mara was a devotee of Sundarar.

The Periya Puranam narrates that Maran was a great devotee of the god Shiva, the patron of Shaivism. He was a practitioner of soma-yajnas (sacrifices), which earned him the epithet Somasi. He served all devotees of Shiva, unmindful of his creed or caste. He believed that one must recite the Panchakshara mantra of Shiva. He went to Tiruvarur and befriended Sundarar. He became a devotee of Sundarar and served him. By serving Sundarar, Somasi Mara Nayanar is said to have acquired the grace of Shiva. Somasi Mara Nayanar challenged the rigid caste rules of that era. He not only intermingled with non-Brahmins, which was taboo in that era, but also served them.

Another episode from the life of Somasi Mara Nayanar is told in legends and temple lore, but not in the Periya Puranam. The legend is practically associated with the Sri Mahakalanathar temple, dedicated to Shiva, in the Nayanar's home-town Thirumakalam. Somasi Mara was living in the town with his wife, Susheelai. Mara wanted to perform a soma-yajna in honour of Shiva and wanted Shiva to attend it to accept the havir (oblations are that burnt in the fire sacrifice of the yajna). He wanted the aim of Sundarar to call Shiva. However, Sundarar was suffering from cough, so he sent thoodhuvalai leaves (the traditional cure for cough, cold and asthma) to Sundarar every day. On enquiring about the herbs, Sundarar was informed by his wife Sangiliyar about his benefactor who sent them every day. Sundarar met Somasi Mara Nayanar, who requested him to invite Shiva to the yajna on his behalf.

At Sundarar's behest, Shiva promised to attend the sacrifice in the Tamil month of Vaikasi, when the moon crossed into the Ayilya nakshatra (lunar mansion). Scholars and sages from far-off places attended the sacrifice, hearing that Shiva would attend it. Shiva arrived with his wife Parvati and sons Ganesha and Kartikeya in the disguise of an outcaste (Dalit) or tribal family. He arrived with four Vedas (scriptures) as dogs and a dead calf. The inauspicious presence of an outcaste family was thought to have defiled the sacrifice. Somasi Mara Nayanar and all the guests, were taken aback by the sight, finally Ganesha assumed his true form and informed the Nayanar about the true identity of the outcastes. The overjoyed Nayanar worshipped the outcaste Shiva and offered him the havir. After the sacrifice, Shiva appeared with Parvati in his true form and blessed Somasi Mara Nayanar, according him the status of a saint.

== Remembrance ==
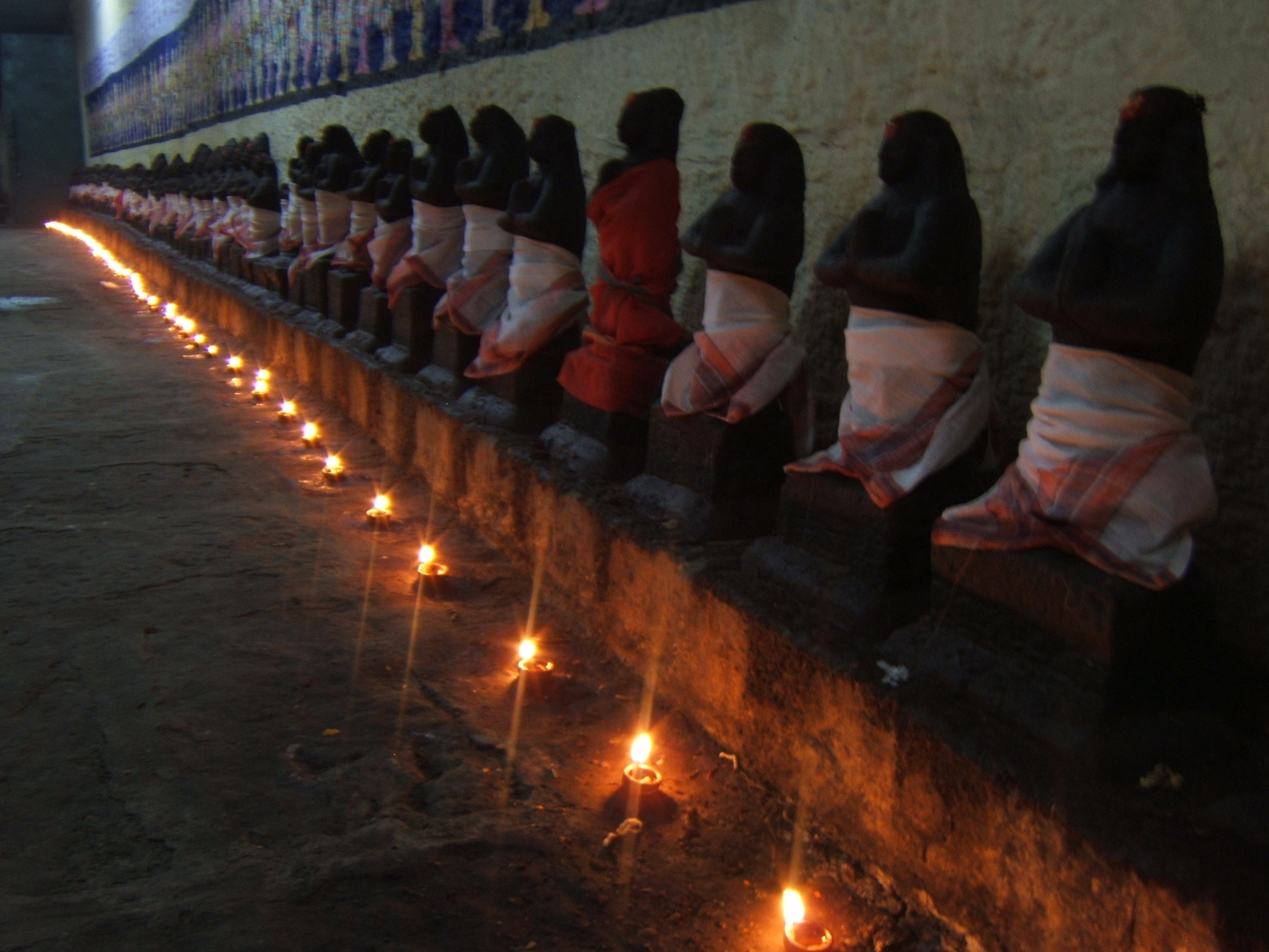
The images of the Nayanars are found in many Shiva temples in Tamil Nadu.

Somasi Mara Nayanar is depicted with a shaven head and with folded hands (see Anjali mudra). He is sometimes depicted with a sacrificial ladle in his hand. Sundarar refers to him as Somasi Maran of Ambar in a hymn to Nayanar saints.

A holy day in his honour is observed on the Vaikasi Ayilya day The Vaikasi Soma Yaga festival of Sri Mahakalanathar temple is celebrated the Vaikasi Ayilya day with ritual re-enactment of Somasi Mara Nayanar's soma-yajna (soma yaga).

Somasi Mara Nayanar receives collective worship as part of the 63 Nayanars. Their icons and brief accounts of his deeds are found in many Shiva temples in Tamil Nadu. Their images are taken out in procession in festivals.
