= Pudukulam =

Pudukulam Pudukulam.V
- village
- Location in Tamil Nadu, India
- Coordinates: 9.7°N 78.48°E
- Country: India
- State: Tamil Nadu
- District: Sivagangai
- Elevation: 70 m (230 ft)

Population (2001)
  - Total: 1,284

Languages
  - Official: Tamil
- Time zone: UTC+5:30 (IST)
- PIN: 630 560
- Telephone code: 914574 XX
- Vehicle registration: TN 63

Pudukulam.V is a village panchayat in Sivagangai district in the Indian state of Tamil Nadu.

== Geography ==
Pudukulam is located at . It has an average elevation of 70 metres (229 feet).

== History ==
The entire village belongs to the same communities Agamudaiyar under Mukkulathor.

== Demographics ==
As of 2001 India census, Pudukulam had a population of 1,284. Males constitute 50% of the population and females 50%. Pudukulam has an average literacy rate of 48%, lower than the national average of 59.5%: male literacy is 81%, and female literacy is 68%. In Pudukulam, 12% of the population is under 6 years of age.

== Economy ==
A vast majority of the workforce is dependent on agriculture (72.8%). The principal crop of Pudukulam village is paddy. The other crops that are grown are sugarcane and groundnut.

== Politics ==
Pudukulam comes under Sivaganga assembly constituency is part of Sivaganga (Lok Sabha constituency)

== Schools ==
- Manamadrai Panchayat Board Primary School, Pudukulam
