= Akkur, Haveri =

Akkur
- village
- Akkur, Haveri is in Haveri district
- Country: India
- State: Karnataka
- District: Haveri
- Talukas: Haveri

Government
  - Body: Village Panchayat

Languages
  - Official: Kannada
- Time zone: UTC+5:30 (IST)
- Nearest city: Haveri
- Civic agency: Village Panchayat

Akkur, Haveri is a village in the southern state of Karnataka, India. It is located in the Haveri taluk of Haveri district in Karnataka.

== See also ==
- Haveri
- Districts of Karnataka
