= Sivaganga =

- Municipality
- Sivagangai
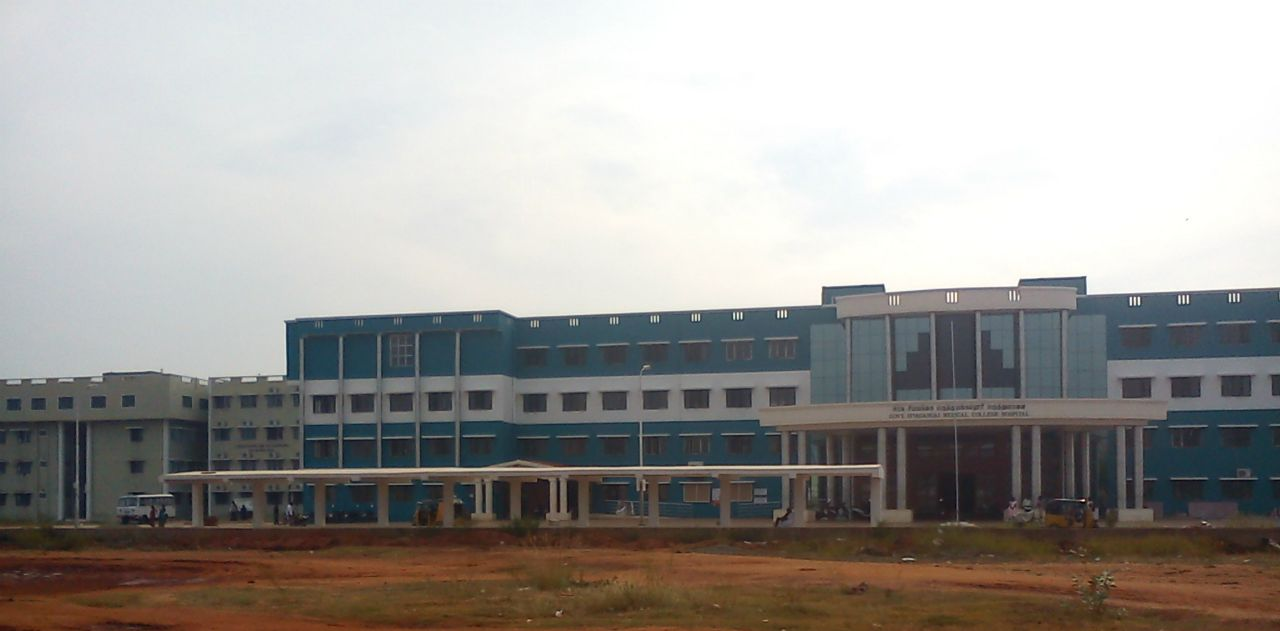
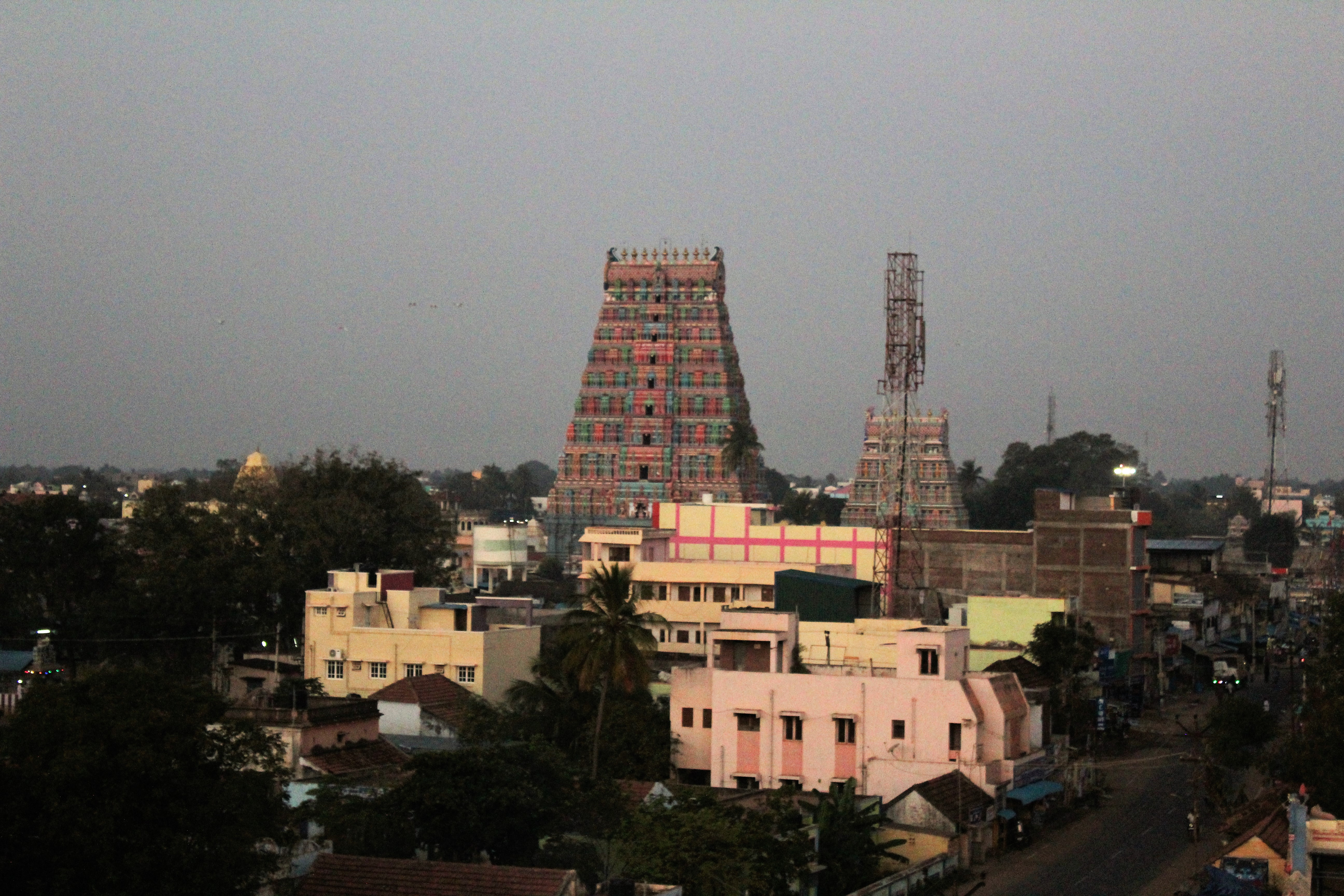
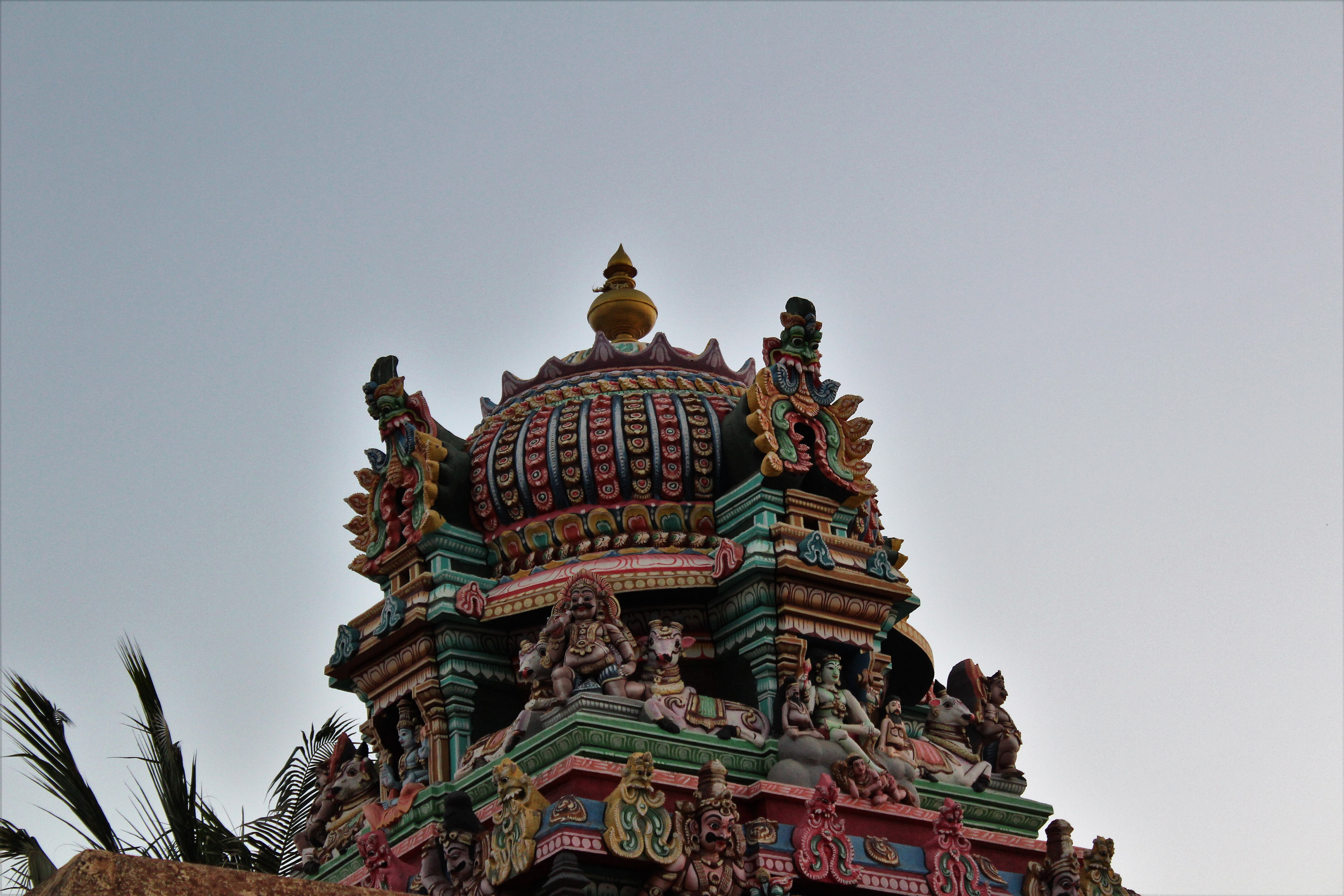
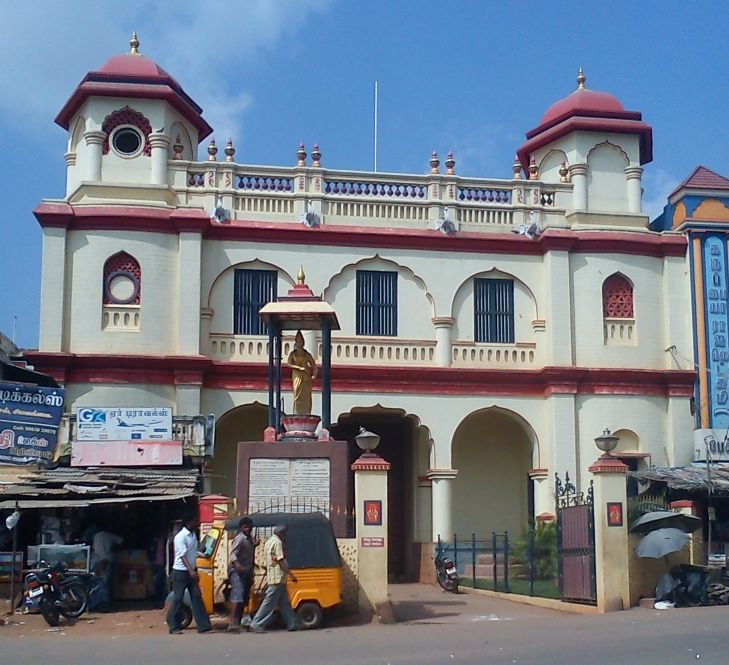
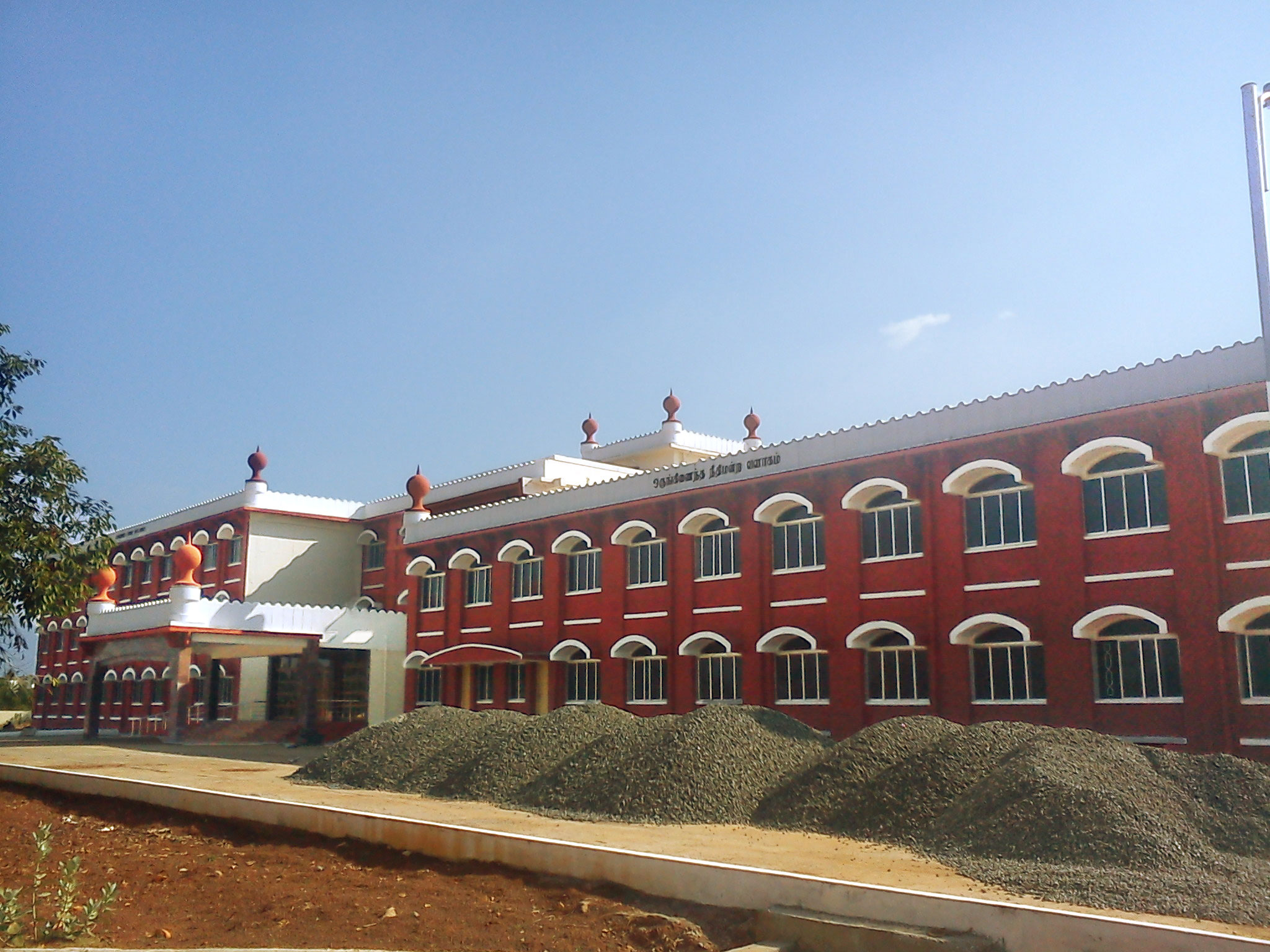
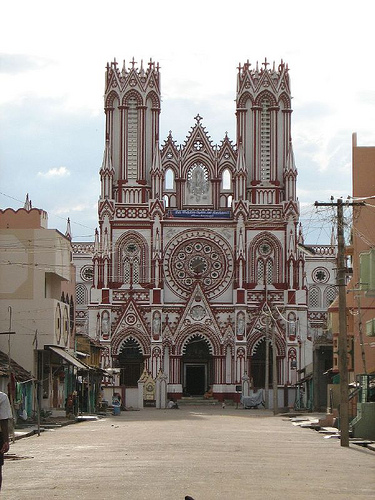
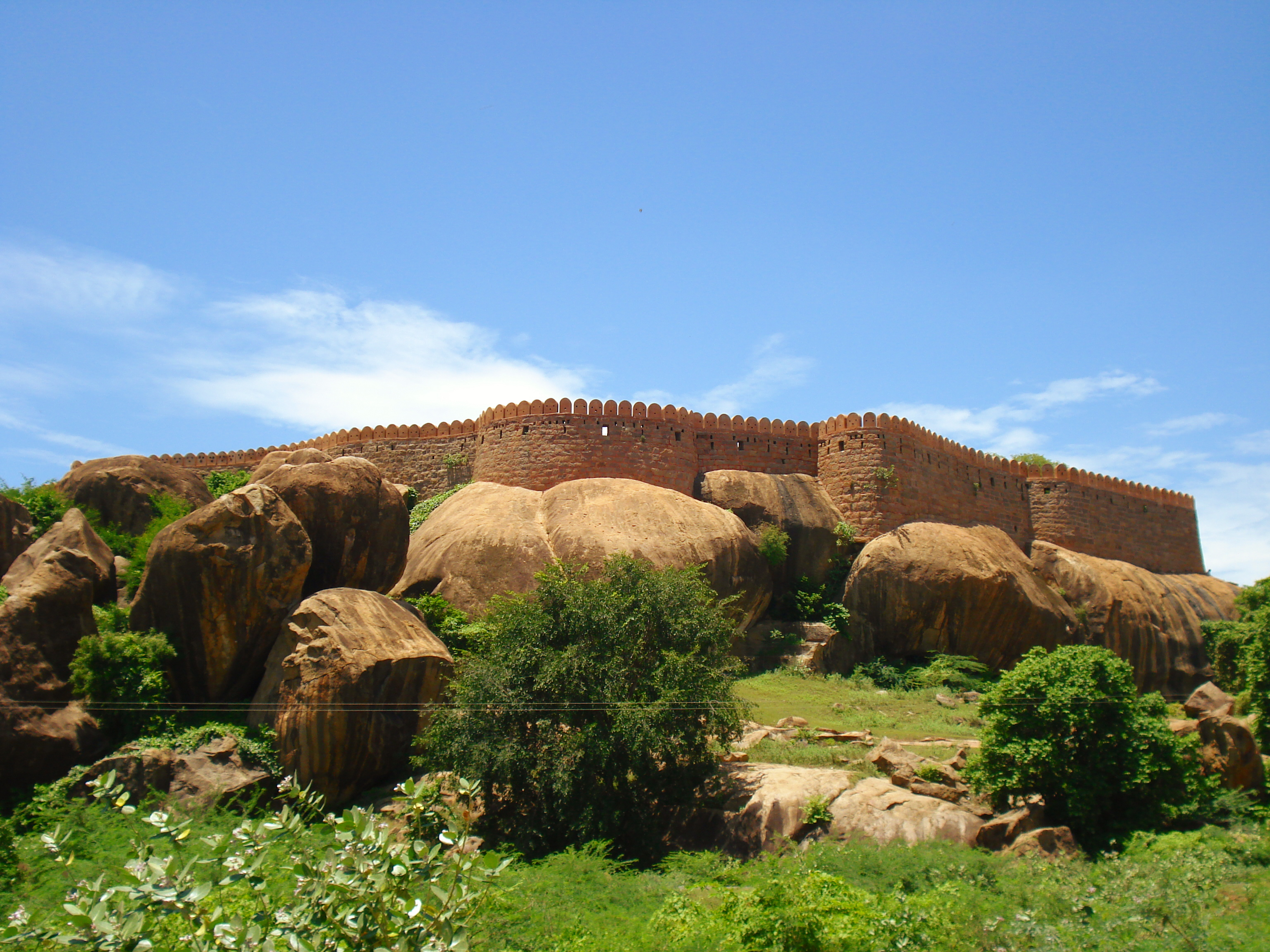
- Sivagangai Medical College Kalayarkoil Kopuram Sivagangai Aranmanai Sivagangai District Court Idaikattur Church Tirumayam Fort
- Nickname: Sivagangai Seemai
- Sivaganga, Tamil Nadu
- Coordinates: 9.843300°N 78.480900°E
- Country: India
- State: Tamil Nadu
- District: Sivaganga
- Region: Pandya Nadu
- Established: 1964

Government
  - Type: Municipality
  - Body: Sivagangai Municipality
  - Chairperson: CM. Durai Anand B.A.
  - Vice chairperson: Mr. Karkannan
  - Commissioner of Municipality: R. Subramanian B.COM.

Area
  - Total: 53.28 km^{2} (20.57 sq mi)
- Elevation: 194 m (636 ft)

Population (2011 census)
  - Total: 40,403
  - Rank: 2nd in Sivagangai district
  - Density: 11,588/km^{2} (30,010/sq mi)
- Demonym: Sivagangai kaaran (male) Sivagangai kaari (female)

Languages
  - Official: Tamil
- Time zone: UTC+5:30 (IST)
- PIN: 630561, 630562 & (623560 = old pincode)
- Telephone code: 04575
- Vehicle registration: TN-63
- Distance from Madurai: 48 kilometres (30 mi) west (road)
- Distance from Trichirapalli: 130 kilometres (81 mi) north (rail)
- Distance from Rameswaram: 120 kilometres (75 mi) south (rail)
- Website: municipality.tn.gov.in/Sivagangai

Sivaganga (Tamil: [siʋaɡəŋɡaɪ]) is a city and headquarters of the Sivaganga district in the South Indian state of Tamil Nadu. It is known for the 16th-century Sivagangai Fort, located in its city centre. Inside the fort, the Rajarajeshwari Amman Temple features many ornate sculptures. Nearby, the government museum has prehistoric relics and natural history displays. The city is located at a distance of 48 km (30 mi) from Madurai and 449 km (279 mi) from the state capital Chennai.

The town is known for agriculture, metal working and weaving. The region around Sivagangai has considerable mineral deposits. This town is surrounded by Chettinad region, so the tradition of Chettinad is highly influenced in Sivaganga Town as well.

Sivaganga comes under the Sivaganga assembly constituency, which elects a member to the Tamil Nadu Legislative Assembly once every five years. It is a part of the Sivaganga constituency which elects its Member of Parliament (MP) once in five years. Roadways are the major mode of transportation to the town and have rail connectivity. The nearest seaport, V. O. Chidambaranar Port Trust, Thoothukudi is located 189 km (117 mi) from Sivaganga, while the nearest airport, Madurai International Airport, is located 53 km (33 mi) from the City.

== History ==
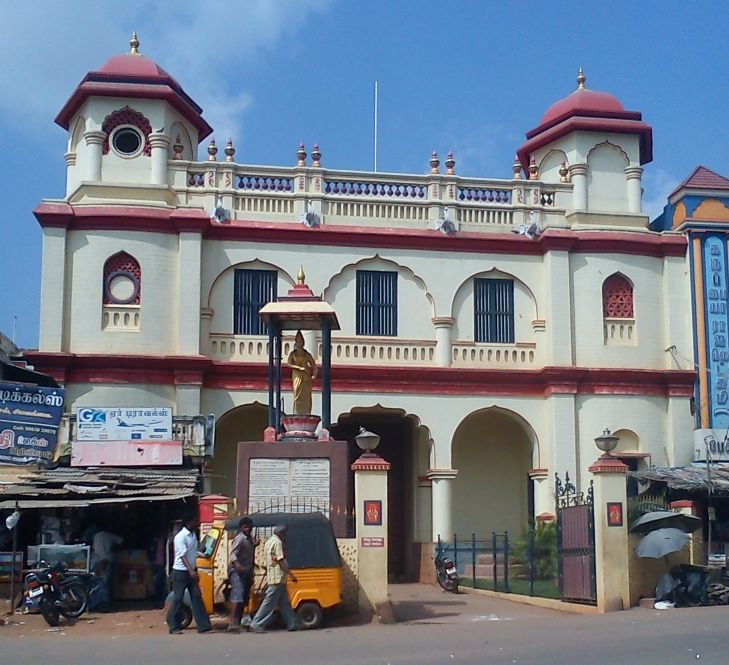
Sivagangai Aranmanai

During the 17th century, Sivaganga was ruled by the Kingdom of Ramnad, which had its boundary spreading across modern-day Sivaganga, Pudukkottai and Ramnathapuram. The seventh king of the empire, Vijaya Raghunatha Sethupathi (also called Kelvan Sethupathy) ruled from 1674 to 1710 and was succeeded by his sister's son Vijaya Ragunatha Sethupathy. He was succeeded by his son-in-law Sundareswara Ragunatha Sethupathy in 1726. Bavani Sankara Thevan, the illegitimate son of Ragunatha Sethupathy, aligned with the Rajah of Tanjore to attack Ramnad. Though Bavani won, he did not honor the earlier decision to cede some portions of the empire to the King of Tanjore. He quarreled with Sasivarna Periya Oodaya Thevar and sent him out of his province. Both Sasivarna and Kattaya Thevar, the brother of Sundareswara, aligned with the Rajah of Tanjore. Both of them conquered Bavani in 1730 with the help of the army of Tanjore. Kattaya Thevar divided the kingdom into five provinces and gave two to Sasivarna, who became the first king of Sivaganga.

As per legend, Sasivarna built the Teppakulam and fort around the spring "Sivaganga", where he met his spiritual guru Sathappan Servai. As per another account, Sasivarna was appointed as the king by the Nawab of Carnatic. Sasivarna died at around 1750 and his son Muthuvaduganatha Periya Udaya Thevar took over the reign. He was shot dead in 1780 by Nawab's troops. His widow Velu Nachiyar and infant Vellacci fled the region and were aided by the two Maruthu brothers namely Periya Maruthu and Chinna Maruthu.

After his death in 1829, there was an extended legal dispute over the succession. From 1863 to 1877 Kathama Nachiar, a daughter, succeeded in winning the claim, but did not attempt to rule with full autonomy and faced ongoing challenges. Supported in her litigation by George Frederick Fischer, a local cotton merchant, Kathama eventually succeeded in securing an 1863 Privy Council decision which granted her the title. After India's independence in 1947, it was under Ramnad district until 1984 and subsequently a part of the newly formed Sivaganga district.

== Geography ==
Sivaganga has an average elevation of 102 metres (334 feet). The town has a tropical wet and dry climate. The maximum temperature during summer is 37 °C or 98.6 °F and during winter it is 28 °C or 82.4 °F. The minimum temperature varies from 23.9 to 27.8 °C (75.0 to 82.0 °F). The seasonal climate conditions are moderate and the weather is uniformly salubrious. The town gets the majority of its rainfall during the north east monsoon period. The average annual rainfall is 931 millimetres or 36.65 inches.

Climate data for Sivaganga
| Month | Jan | Feb | Mar | Apr | May | Jun | Jul | Aug | Sep | Oct | Nov | Dec | Year |
|---|---|---|---|---|---|---|---|---|---|---|---|---|---|
| Mean daily maximum °C (°F) | 28.6 (83.5) | 30.3 (86.5) | 32.1 (89.8) | 35.8 (96.4) | 37.0 (98.6) | 37.0 (98.6) | 34.9 (94.8) | 33.6 (92.5) | 33.5 (92.3) | 31.7 (89.1) | 30.1 (86.2) | 28.5 (83.3) | 32.8 (91.0) |
| Mean daily minimum °C (°F) | 23.9 (75.0) | 23.8 (74.8) | 24.8 (76.6) | 27.1 (80.8) | 27.8 (82.0) | 27.3 (81.1) | 26.7 (80.1) | 26.3 (79.3) | 26.0 (78.8) | 25.5 (77.9) | 24.7 (76.5) | 24.1 (75.4) | 25.7 (78.2) |
| Average rainfall mm (inches) | 30.4 (1.20) | 11.5 (0.45) | 18.1 (0.71) | 49.2 (1.94) | 75.1 (2.96) | 47.9 (1.89) | 64.2 (2.53) | 73.4 (2.89) | 91.7 (3.61) | 181.6 (7.15) | 196.5 (7.74) | 91.9 (3.62) | 931.5 (36.69) |
Source: Climate Sivaganga

== Demographics ==
Religions in Sivaganga
| Religion | Percent(%) |
| Hindu | 84.75% |
| Muslim | 10.07% |
| Christian | 4.66% |
| Sikh | 0.02% |
| Buddhist | 0.01% |
| Other | 0.49% |

Historical population
| Year | Pop. | ±% |
|---|---|---|
| 1961 | 15,642 | — |
| 1971 | 20,826 | +33.1% |
| 1981 | 24,832 | +19.2% |
| 1991 | 33,190 | +33.7% |
| 2001 | 40,220 | +21.2% |
| 2011 | 92,359 | +129.6% |

According to 2011 census, Sivaganga had a population of 40,403 with a sex-ratio of 990 females for every 1,000 males, much above the national average of 929. A total of 3,880 were under the age of six, constituting 1,985 males and 1,895 females. Scheduled Castes and Scheduled Tribes accounted for 9.59% and 0.07% of the population respectively. The average literacy of the town was 83.86%, compared to the national average of 72.99%. The town had a total of 10,184 households. There were a total of 14,145 workers, comprising 164 cultivators, 294 main agricultural labourers, 246 in house hold industries, 11,406 other workers, 2,035 marginal workers, 54 marginal cultivators, 127 marginal agricultural labourers, 173 marginal workers in household industries and 1,681 other marginal workers. Sivaganga town had a growth of 25% during the decades of 1991 and 2001. The population density of the town has nearly doubled in the decades of 1981, 1991 and 2001. Spread over area of 6.970 km^{2} (697.0 ha), the density increased from 3500 person per km^{2} in 1981 and to 4,800 person per km^{2} in 1991. The development was largely concentrated along the whole town area.

As per the religious census of 2011, Sivaganga had 84.75% Hindus, 10.07% Muslims, 4.66% Christians, 0.02% Sikhs, 0.01% Buddhists and 0.49% following other religions.

== Administration ==
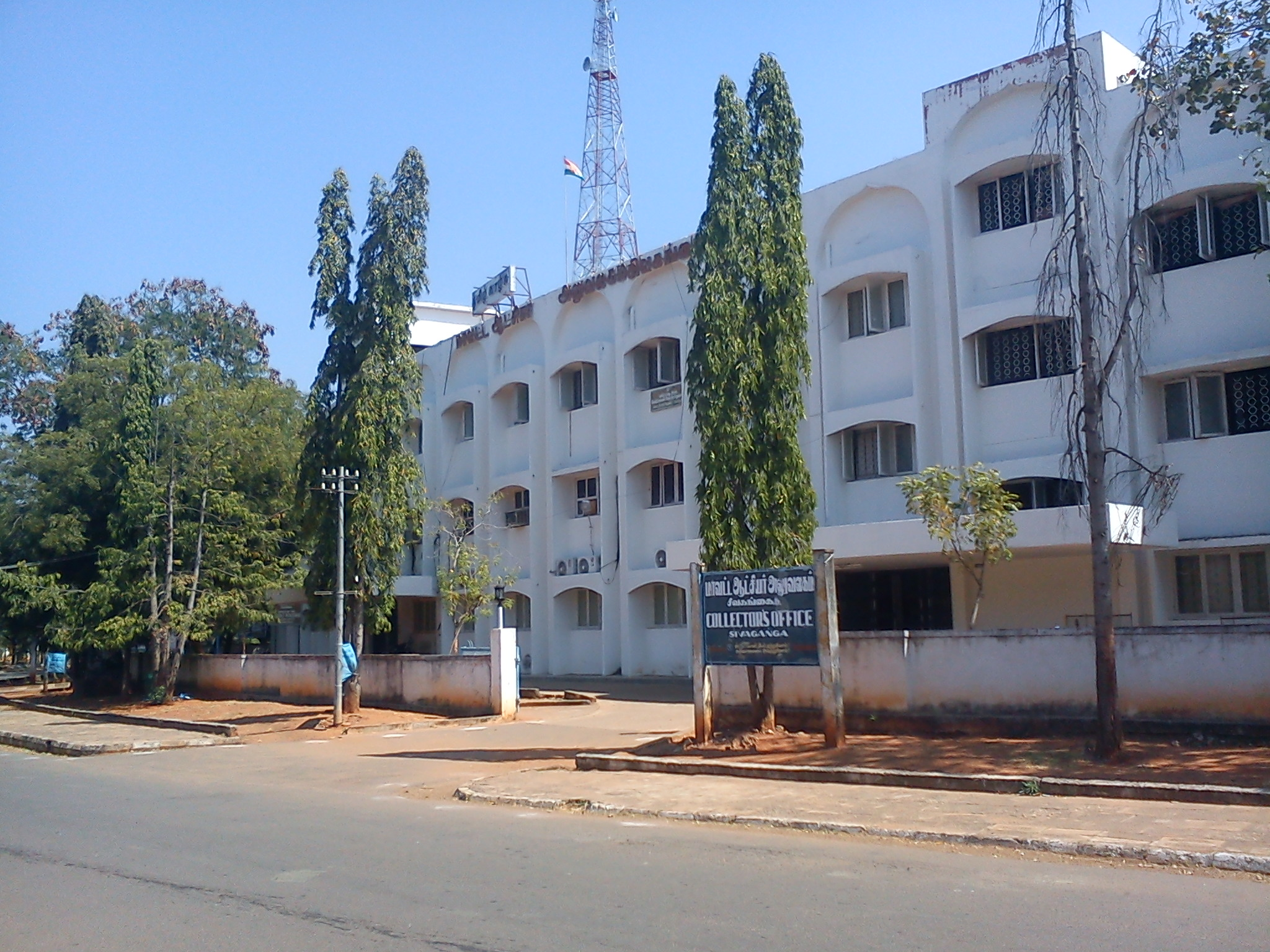
District Collector Office-Sivagangai

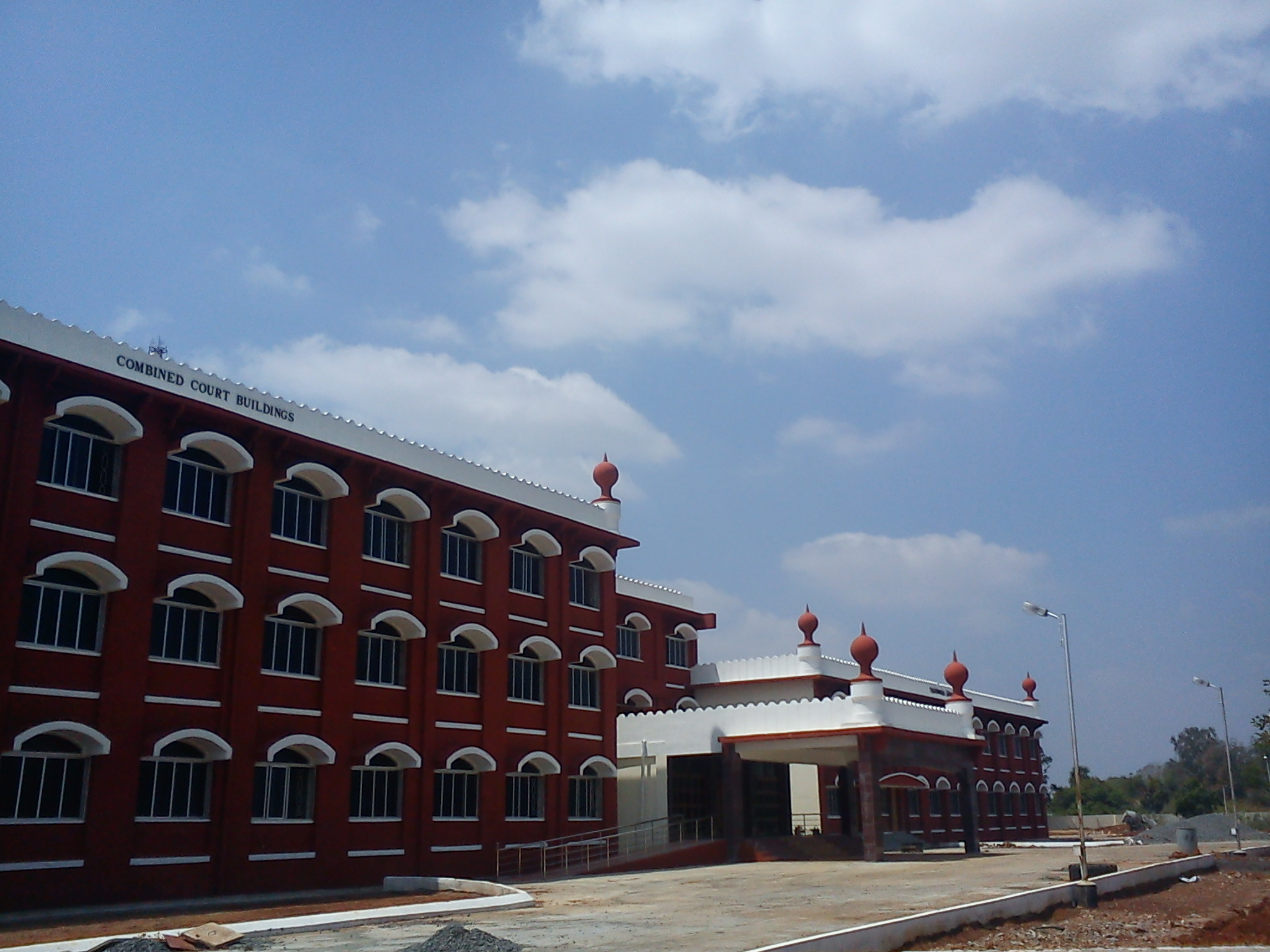
Sivagangai District Court

Sivaganga is the district headquarters of Sivaganga District. It is bounded by Pudukkottai district on the northeast, Tiruchirapalli district on the north, Ramanathapuram district on the south east, Virudhunagar district on the south west and Madurai District on the west. Sivaganga District was carved out from composite Ramnad District during July 1984. The District Courts of Sivaganga are present in the town. These courts are under administrative and judicial control of the Madras High Court (Madurai Bench) of the state.

Municipality officials
| Chairman | M. Arujunan |
| Commissioner | K. Saravanan |
| Vice Chairman | V. Sekar |
Elected members
| Member of Legislative Assembly | Cholan CT. Palanichamy |
| Member of Parliament | Karti P. Chidambaram |

The municipality of Sivaganga was constituted as a third grade municipality in 1965 and promoted to first grade in May 1998. As of 2008, the municipality covered an area of 6.97 km^{2} (2.69 mi^{2}) and had a total of 27 members. The functions of the municipality are split into six departments: General, Engineering, Revenue, Public Health, Town Planning and the Computer Wing. These are under the control of a municipal commissioner who is the supreme executive head. The legislative powers are vested in a body of 27 members, one each from the 27 wards. The legislative body is headed by an elected chairperson assisted by a deputy chairperson. The municipality had an income of ₹54,631,000 and an expenditure of ₹75,385,000 for the year 2010–11.

Sivaganga comes under the Sivaganga State Assembly Constituency and it elects a member to the Tamil Nadu Legislative Assembly once every five years. The current Member of Legislative Assembly (MLA) of the constituency is Cholan CT. Palanichamy from the AIADMK Party.

Sivaganga is a part of the Sivaganga (Lok Sabha constituency) – it has the following six assembly constituencies – Thirumayam, Tiruppattur, Karaikudi, Alangudi, Manamadurai and Sivaganga. The current Member of Parliament from the constituency is Karti P. Chidambaram from the Congress party. P. Chidambaram, who was the Finance Minister of the country during the previous tenure, was elected from the constituency for seven times.

== Transport ==
Road

Buses that connect the nearby villages and smaller towns terminate at the Sivagangai bus-stand. The State Transport Corporation runs long-distance buses to Coimbatore, Chennai from Sivagangai bus-stand. Also main nearest transport hubs are Mattuthavani Bus Terminus & Arappalayam Bus Terminus Madurai, From Sivagangai all mofussil buses that connect towns such as Karaikudi, Manamadurai, Trichy, Sivakasi, Aruppukottai, Dindigul, Oddanchatram, Palani, Pattukottai, Thanjavur, Theni, Erode, Aranthangi, Nagore, Thiruvarur, Velankanni, Rameshwaram, Ramanathapuram, Kalayar Kovil, Paramakudi, Dharapuram, Pudukottai, Nagapattinam, Tiruppur, Coimbatore (TNSTC), terminate at the bus-stand.

National Highway 85 Cochin-Munnar-Bodinayakanur-Theni-Madurai City-Sivagangai-Thondi, NH 36 Villupuram- Panruti-Kumbakonam - Thanjavur-Pudukottai-Tirupathur-Sivagangai-Manamadurai and State Highway SH 34 Ramanathapuram-Ilayankudi-Sivagangai-Melur are the major roads passing via Sivaganga.

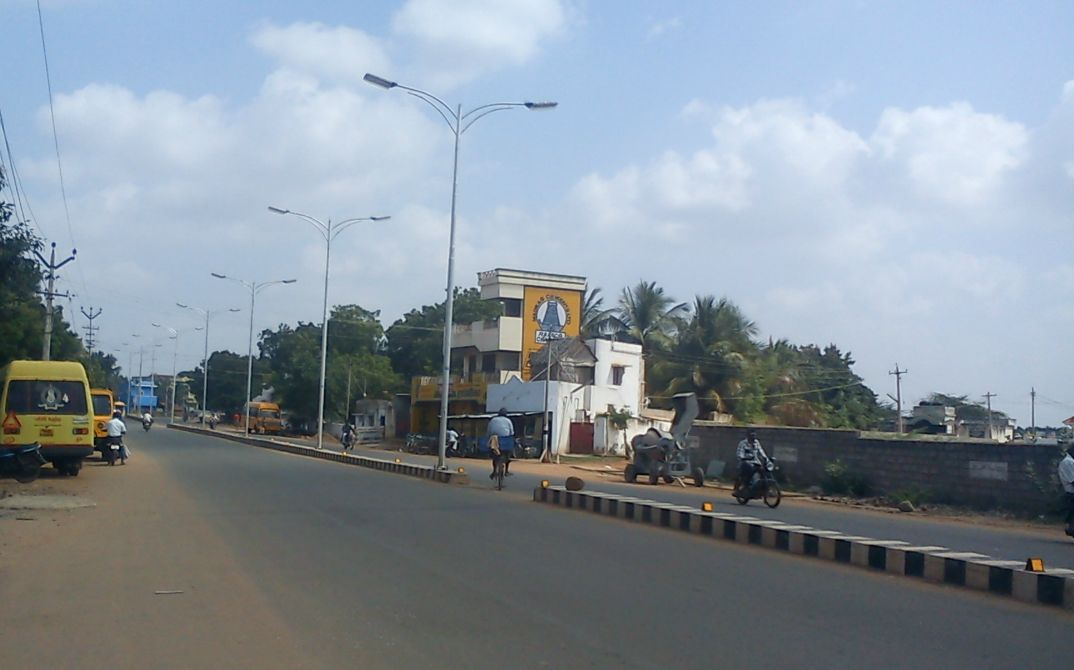
NH85 Thondi - Madurai -Kochin Road

Train

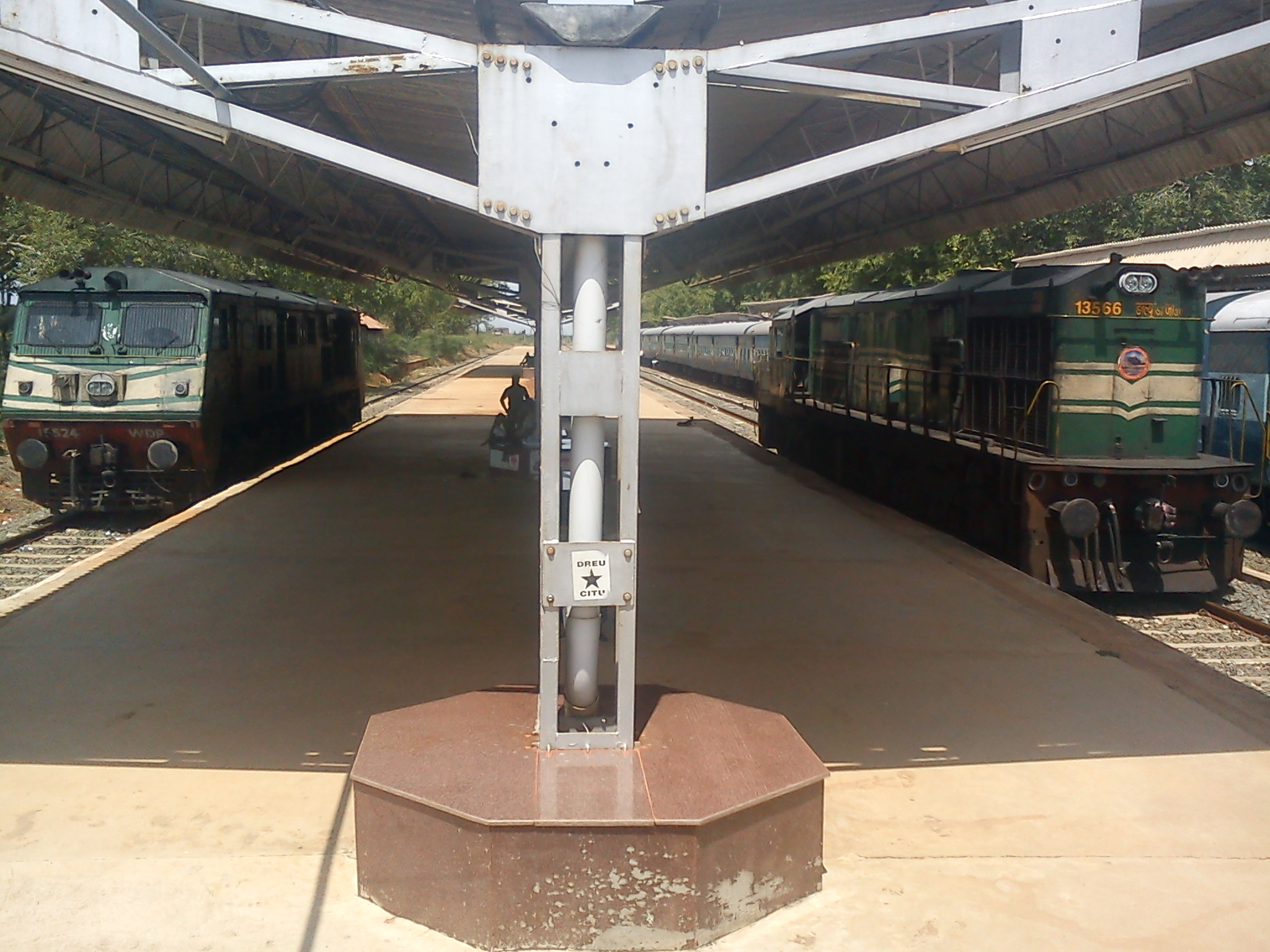
Platform 2 & 3

Sivaganga railway station is located in the east side of town, a Major stopping point in the Manamadurai Junction - Karaikudi Junction - Tiruchirapalli junction branch line. All trains running in Chennai Egmore - Rameswaram section and Tiruchirapalli - Virudhunagar (via: Manamadurai) section make a technical halt here. Citizens from surrounding localities like Ilayankudi, Devakottai, Thondi, Sarugani and Kalayarkoil use this station. The station also operates a 'for goods' service in order to reduce the rush in from the frontier railway main line (Virudhunagar, Madurai Jn, Dindigul, Tiruchy). Several Express trains and passenger trains pass through the town and connect with cities such as Karaikudi, Manamadurai, Paramakudi, Virudhunagar, Aruppukottai, Tenkasi, Shengottai, Rameshwaram, Ramanathapuram, Tiruchirapalli, Coimbatore, Erode, Tiruppur, Chennai Egmore, Thanjavur, Viluppuram, Cuddalore, Pudukottai, Virudhachalam, Varanasi, and Bhubaneswar.

Other prominent Railway Junctions in the district are Manamadurai Junction (18 km), Karaikudi Junction(50 km) and Madurai Junction(60 km). So There are direct trains from Madurai connecting the important cities in Tamil Nadu such as Chennai, Coimbatore, Kanyakumari, Trichy, Tirunelveli, Karaikudi, Mayiladuthurai, Rameswaram, Thanjavur and Virudhachalam. Madurai has rail connectivity with important cities and towns in India.

Air

The nearest airport is the Madurai International Airport 40 km away from the town. There is connectivity available to major cities such as Chennai, Delhi, Mumbai, Hyderabad, Bangalore and internationally such as Dubai, Singapore, and Colombo.

== Education ==
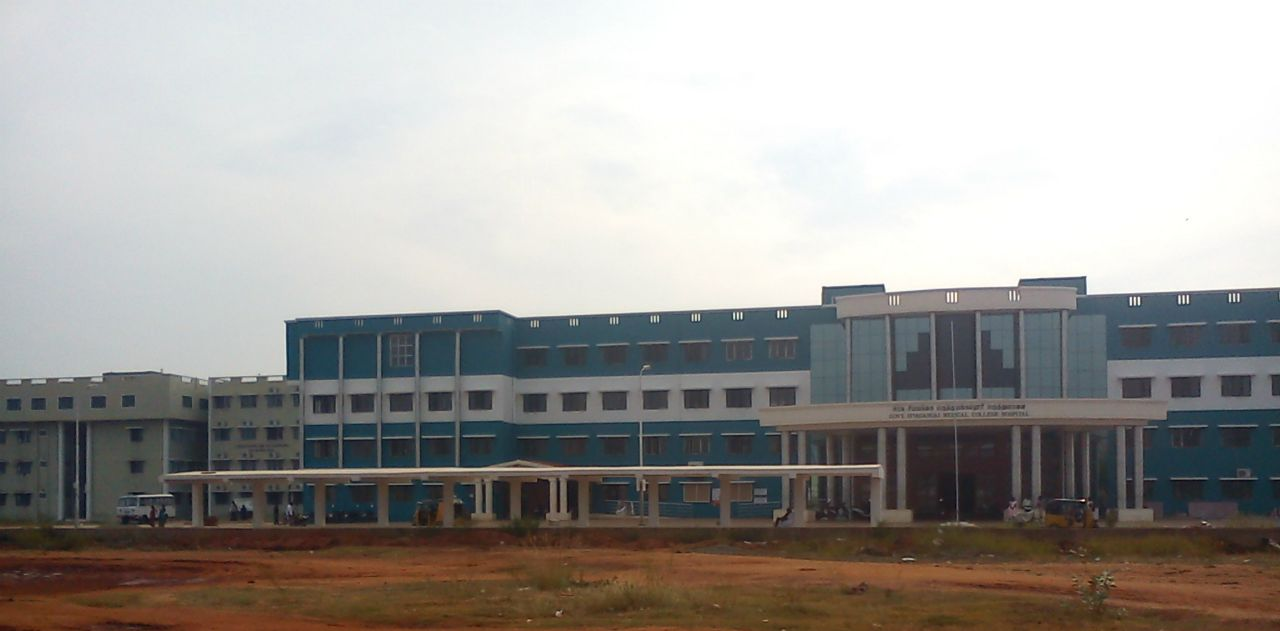
Sivagangai Govt Medical College & Hospital

Government Sivagangai Medical College and Hospital is an Educational Institution located in outskirts of Sivagangai Municipality, Tamil Nadu. The city also has colleges including Mannar Durai Singam Government Arts and Science college, Government Arts College for Women, Vickram Engineering College, Pandian Saraswathi Yadav Engineering College, Micheal Engineering College, and Pannai Engineering College. Prist University (Madurai Cambus) is located 15 km away from the city.

== Economy ==
Graphite is one of the common resources in Sivagangai. Very valuable graphite is available in Sivagangai and its surrounding areas. The Sivaganga graphite is of flaky variety with 14% average Fixed Carbon used in the manufacture of refractory bricks, expanded graphite, crucibles and carbon brushes. TAMIN has over 600 acres of graphite bearing land in Pudupatti, Kumaripatti and Senthiudayanathapuram of Sivaganga taluk, Sivagangai District, Tamil Nadu. Estimated reserve of graphite ore in leasehold area is three million tonnes.(recoverable graphite from 14% F.C is approximately 300,000 tonnes).

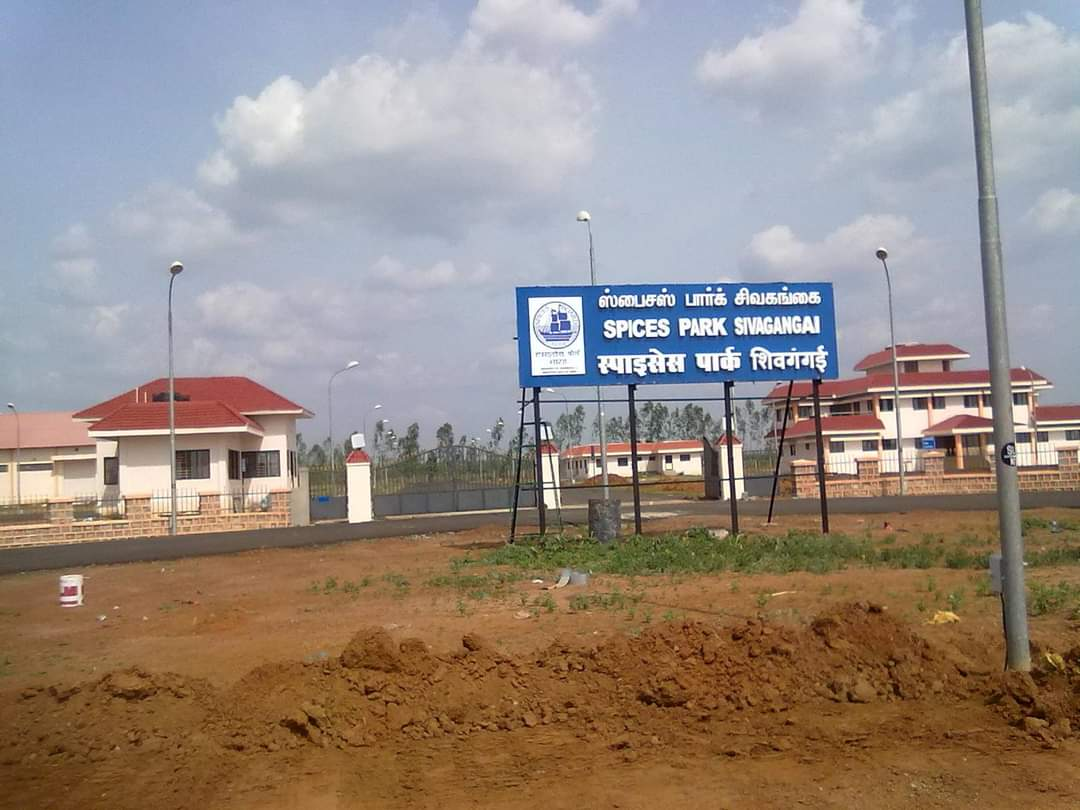
Spices Park

The majority of the workforce is dependent on agriculture (72.8%). The principal crop of Sivaganga district is paddy rice. Most of the district has red soil. The other crops grown are sugarcane, groundnuts, pulses, millet and cereals.

Sakthi sugar factory is also located in Padamathur, Sivaganga. It has the capacity to produce more than 5000 tons of sugar per day. Moser Baer Clean Energy Limited has commissioned a 5 MW grid connected solar PV project at Sivaganga, Tamil Nadu. The project was awarded to Sapphire Industrial Infrastructure Pvt. Ltd., a wholly owned subsidiary of MBCEL, through a competitive bidding process conducted by the Tamil Nadu Renewable Development Agency. The project is implemented under the 50 MWp generation based incentive scheme of the Ministry of New and Renewable Energy, Government of India.

Agriculture is the main occupation of the people in Sivagangai district. The region is well known for the cultivation of paddy, sugarcane, pulses, and groundnut. Several small and medium-scale rice mills and oil mills operate across the district to support the agricultural economy. The district is part of the proposed Madurai–Sivagangai industrial corridor, which aims to promote textile, agro-based, and manufacturing industries in the region. Industrial estates have been developed near Sivagangai and Kalaiyarkoil to attract investors and improve local employment opportunities.

The town also benefits from improved road connectivity through the Madurai–Sivagangai–Ramanathapuram Greenfield Expressway, which enhances trade and logistics. Small-scale industries related to dairy, construction materials, and handicrafts are also emerging within the region.

== Tourism ==
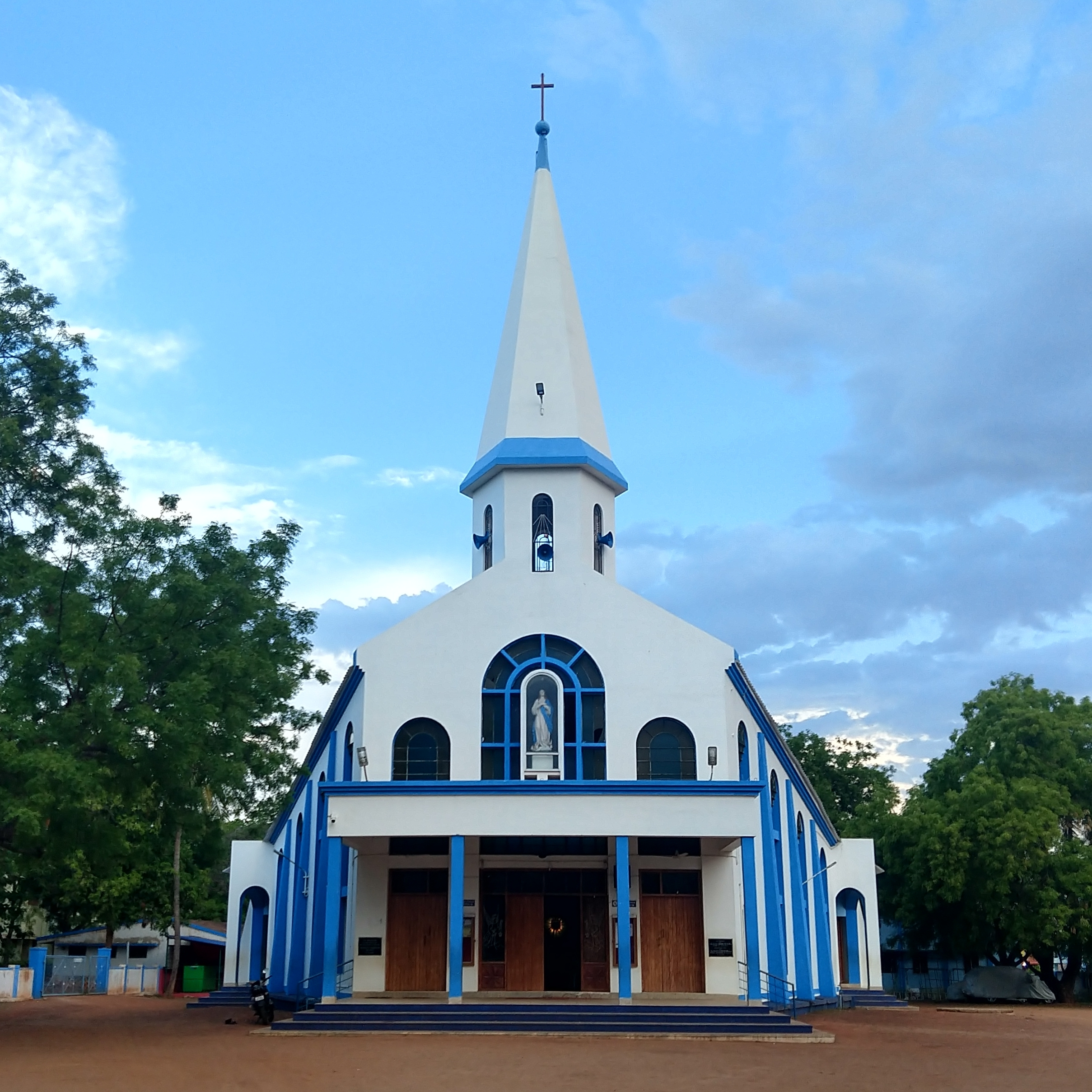
Alangara Annai Cathedral

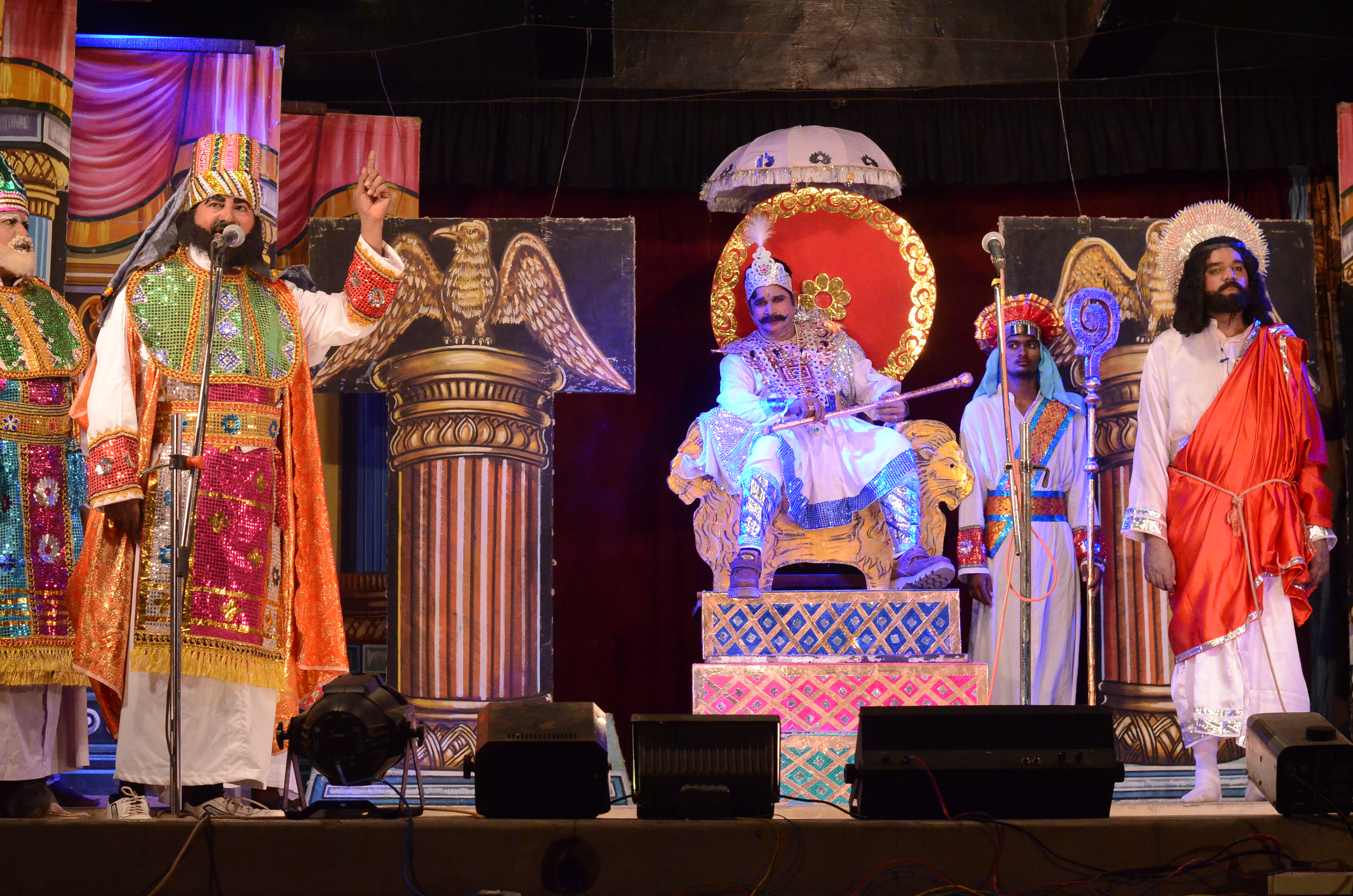
scene from pascca

Sakkanthi Big Chettinad style home is famous for cinema shooting and culture.

Kannudayal Nayagi Amman temple, in Nataraasan kottai which is 5 km away from the town. Eswar temple in Kalayarkoil is a Hindu temple with Pandiyan architecture construction.

Alangara Annai Cathedral is the major church and headquarters for Roman Catholic Diocese of Sivagangai (including Ramnad and Sivagangai District). The church has architecture style like "fish structure" from the bird eye view.

== Utility services ==
Electricity supply to Sivaganga is regulated and distributed by the Tamil Nadu Electricity Board (TNEB). The town along with its suburbs forms the Madurai Electricity Distribution Circle. Water supply is provided by the municipality of Sivaganga from Idaikathur Vaigai river (2.5 MLD) and Paiyur Pillai vayal & Keelpathi (0.4 MLD) through feeders located in various parts of the town. In the period 2010–2011, a total of 2.9 million litres of water was supplied every day for households in the town. About 22.5 metric tonnes of solid waste are collected from Sivaganga every day by door-to-door collection and subsequently the source segregation and dumping is carried out by the sanitary department of the municipality. The coverage of solid waste management had an efficiency of 90% as of 2001. There is no underground drainage system in the town and the major sewerage system for disposal of sullage is through septic tanks, open drains and public conveniences. The municipality maintains a total of 79.57 km (49.44 mi) of storm water drains: 38.75 km (24.08 mi) surfaced drains and 40.82 km (25.36 mi) kutcha drains. There is a government hospital, a government women and children's hospital, and 21 private hospitals and clinics. There are a total of 2,013 street lamps in Sivaganga: 333 sodium lamps, 1,662 tube lights, 17 mercury vapour lamps and five high mast beam lamp. The municipality operates two markets, namely a daily market and a weekly market that cater to the needs of the town and the rural areas around it.

== Notable people ==
- Velu Nachiyar
- Kuyili
- Alagappa Chettiar
- Kannadasan
- Palaniappan Chidambaram
- Muthulingam (poet)
- Kaniyan Pungundranar
- Seeman
- Ganja Karuppu
- Tha. Kiruttinan
- Perarasu
- Chinnaponnu
- Maranayanar
- Suba Veerapandian

== See also ==
- Devapattu
- Pudukulam
- Sivaganga Palace

== Other sources ==
- Iyer, K. Annasawmi (1899). The Sivaganga Zemindary: Its Origin and Its Litigation 1730 to 1899, with a Genealogical Tree. Hoe & Company, Printers.
- MSME Development Institute. Brief Industrial profile of Sivaganga district (PDF) (Report). Chennai: Ministry of MSME, Government of India.
