= Ilayankudi Maranar =

Personal life
- Born: unknown Ilaiyangudi
- Honors: Nayanar saint,

Religious life
- Religion: Hinduism
- Philosophy: Shaivism, Bhakti

Ilayankudi Maranar (also spelt as Ilayangudi Maranar), also known Ilaiyangudi Nayanar, Ilaiyankuti Nayanar, Ilayangudi Mara Nayanar (Ilaiyangudi Mara Nayanar, Ilayankudi Mara Nayanar), is a Nayanar saint, venerated in the Hindu sect of Shaivism. He is generally counted as the fourth in the list of 63 Nayanars. He is also called Marar, Maran and Mara Nayanar, names he shares with Somasi Mara Nayanar. The two Nayanars are generally differentiated by the prefixes "Ilayankudi" and "Somasi".

== Life ==
The life of Ilayankudi Maranar is described in the Periya Puranam by Sekkizhar (12th century), which is a hagiography of the 63 Nayanars.

Offering food to the Lord’s devotees had purified his heart and made him a fit receptacle for the grace of God. As Tiruvalluvar has said in the Kural:

"Fortune dwells with a delighted heart in the house of the man who honours his guest with a pleasant countenance."

Ilayankudi Maranar (Marar) was born in Ilaiyangudi (also spelt as Ilayankudi and Ilayangudi), presently in Sivaganga district of the Indian state of Tamil Nadu. He derives his name from his birthplace. Marar was a Vellalar by caste and worked as a farmer. He accumulated great wealth by agriculture. He was a staunch devotee of the god Shiva, the patron god of Shaivism and served the god and his devotees. He used to welcome devotees of Shiva to his home, ritually wash their feet and feed them a feast.

To test Marar's devotion, Shiva made his wealth wane. He continued to serve the devotees in penury, as he did in plenty. The Nayanar sold his properties to feed the devotees. On a night of torrential downpour, Shiva came disguised as a devotee and came to Marar's impoverished home. Marar welcomed the guest with respect, dried him and gave him a warm seat to sit. The starving couple pondered how they could feed the guest as the house had no food and it was pouring outside. The wife suggested that the paddy rains sown in the field can be gathered and prepared as a meal for the guest. Marar rushed to the field in the deluge and gathered the flooding seeds from the field. Since there was no firewood, the Nayanar pulled a rafter from the wooden roof to use as fuel. While the wife cleaned and prepared the rice, Marar went to the backyard to bring greens (generally described as spinach) to a prepare a curry. Marar went with the food to awaken the resting devotee. The devotee suddenly blazed like a flame. Shiva appeared in his true form with his consort Parvati and blessed the couple. He took Marar and his wife to his abode Kailash.

== Remembrance ==
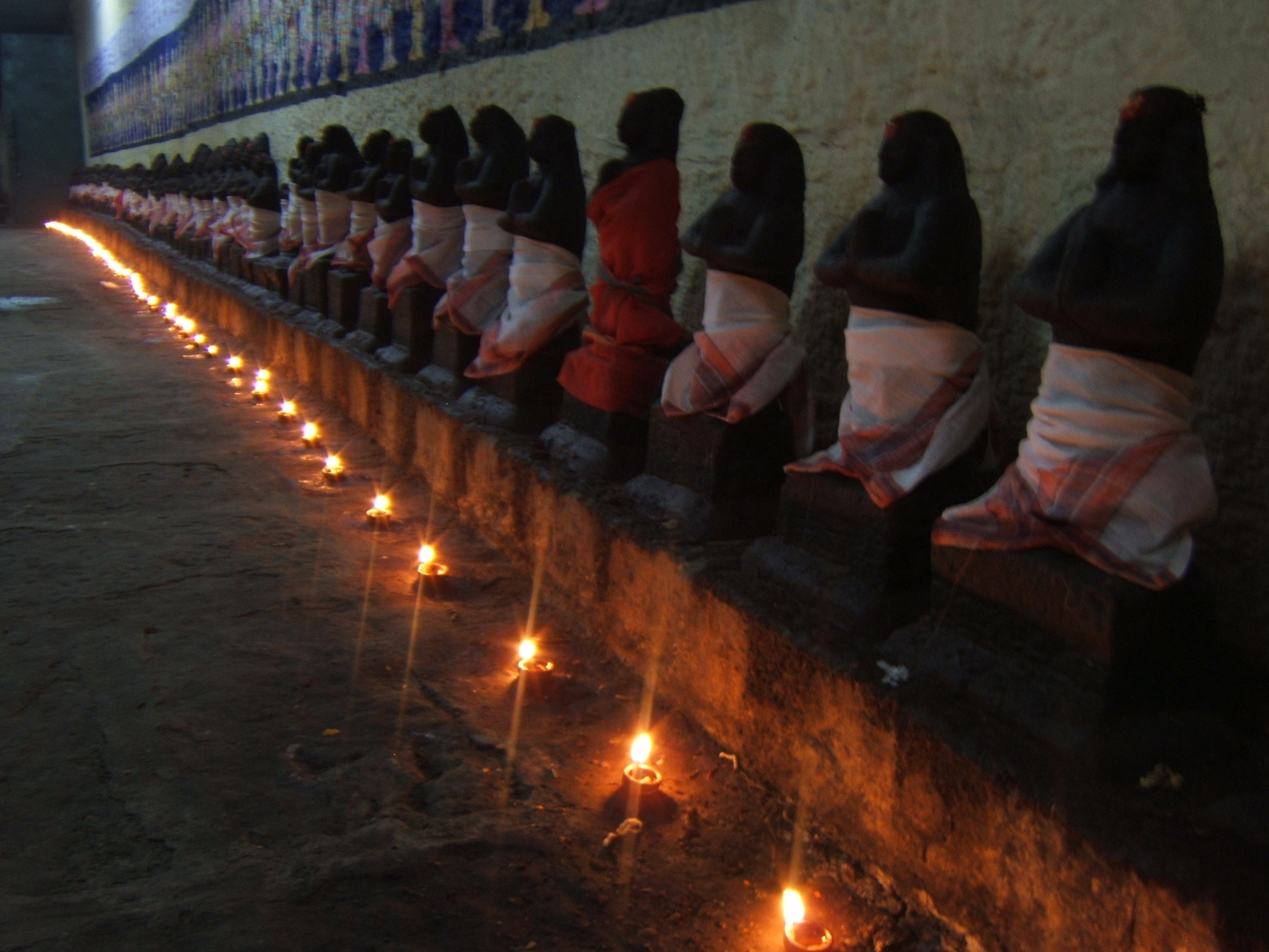
The images of the Nayanars are found in many Shiva temples in Tamil Nadu.

One of the most prominent Nayanars, Sundarar (8th century) venerates Ilayankudi Maranar (called Maran of Ilaiyankuti) in the Tiruthonda Thogai, a hymn to Nayanar saints.

Ilayankudi Maranar is worshipped in the Tamil month of Avani, when the moon enters the Maghā nakshatra (lunar mansion). He is depicted like a sage, usually with a beard and with folded hands (see Anjali mudra). He receives collective worship as part of the 63 Nayanars. Their icons and brief accounts of his deeds are found in many Shiva temples in Tamil Nadu. Their images are taken out in procession in festivals.

Ilayankudi Maranar is especially associated with Rajendra Chozheeswarar temple – dedicated to Shiva – in his home-town Ilaiyangudi. While the formal temple is derived from inscriptions of the king Rajendra Chola I (reign: 1012–1044 CE), the locals call the temple Jyotishvara or Lord of the flame, alluding to the legend of the Nayanar. A shrine is dedicated to the Nayanar in the temple. On Avani Maghā day, icons of Ilayankudi Maranar and his wife Punithavathi as well as the presiding deities Shiva and Parvati is paraded in the village in a temple cart (Chapparam). The Naivedhya (food offering) of spinach is presented to Shiva of this temple. Devotees also emulate the Nayanar by practising Annadana (charity in form of food). The Nayanar's house and field – situated near the shrine – are venerated as Mulai Vari Amudhu Alitha Nattrangal, the land which created Naivedhya for God.
