= Akkur, Mayiladuthurai =

Akkur
- Town
- Location within Tamil Nadu Location within India
- Coordinates: 11.101°N 79.786°E
- Country: India
- State: Tamil Nadu
- District: Mayiladuthurai

Area
  - Total: 15 km^{2} (5.8 sq mi)

Population (2011)
  - Total: 6,333
- Time zone: UTC+05:30 (IST)
- Pincode: 609301

Akkur is a small town in Mayiladuthurai district, Tamil Nadu, India 15 kilometres (9.3 mi) from Mayiladuthurai town. Akkur is located 260 km from the state capital, Chennai. Nearby towns include Mayiladuthurai (15 km), Sirkazhi (13.9 km), Karaikal (24.6 km).

== Temples and mosques ==
Temples include Sri Thanthonriswarar Temple, Sri Raajagobala Perumal Temple with Sri Aadhinarayana perumal kovil and Sri Seethala devi Mariyamman Temple. Aakkur is Thevara Paadal petra Sthalam. Akkur Thevaram is very famous devotional song sung by the Nalvar. Thevaram has a pathigam (chapter), which praises the life and service of Vellalas, who lived here, for their dedicated agricultural efforts and also philanthropy. Later Arunagirinathar also visited Aakkur and sang a song in praise of Lord Subramaniar of this Temple. Thanthonri means the Shivalingam appeared on its own while digging a pond located in front. The Aayirathil Oruvar Sannidhi is located on the north of the main Moolavar Sannidhi. It is told that a sage wished to serve anna dhanam to 1001 sivanadiyars. Only 1000 turned up. The sage waited and waited for the 1001st to come, meanwhile staying hungry himself. Lord Shiva came disguised as the 1001st sivanadiyar and enabled the sage to complete his prayer. Hence Lord Shiva who came is named "Aayirathu Oruvar". This temple is built Maada Kovil mode with steep staircases where elephants can not climb. Olden Kings were in favour of Maada Kovils to avoid hungry elephants stomping inside.

Akkur is also the birthplace of Sirappuli Nayanar, one of the 63 Naayanmaars. A festival, "Siraappuli Nayanar Guru Poojai" is celebrated every year.

The Maariyamman Temple festival is lasting 11 days is held in April every year. The Raajagopaalaswaamy Perumaal Koil, in which the Lord is depicted in his lying down pose, is also ceremonially worshipped.

The District's biggest mosque is here.

The Abhiraami Amman Temple (Thirukkadaiyur) is located nearby. The Chozhaa King Ko-ch-chenkanan built thisTemple as a Maada Kovil.

In this Temple Lord Shiva, Thaanthondrishwarar and Goddess, Vaal Nedum Kanni Amman afford dharshan, adjacent to each other, as in their marriage i.e. ThirumaNaakolam. A similar dharshan can be had at Thirumaancheri.
