= Ambal =

Prince of Khanty and Tatars

Ambal (Russian: Амбал) was a prince of Khanty and Tatars who lived in 16th and 17th centuries in the basin of Sylva River. In the 1623–1624 census book of Mikhail Kaysarov this territory was divided into two uluses, Karyevsky Ulus and Rozhin Ulus. According to A. A. Dmitriyev, a residence of Ambal was situated in Rozhin.

Ambal is mentioned in the biography of Russian Saint Tryphon of Vyatka, who settled at the banks of Lower Mulyanka River in 1570 and began preaching Christ to Khanty and Mansi. When Tryphon cut down the giant spruce, which was an object of worship among the pagans, Ambal said him, "I'm wondering, old man, how could you do it? Own fathers and we worshiped this tree as god; nobody could even think to destroy it. Even people of your faith didn't dare to touch it. Or you are stronger than our gods?". Tryphon answered, "God, whom I preach to you, He helped me in that deed astonished you, helped for your Salvation." Later, as it said in hagiography, Khanty, being astonished by the Tryphon's miracles, began to adopt Christianity. One of the newly converted was Prince Ambal's daughter.
