= Eriyur =

- Village
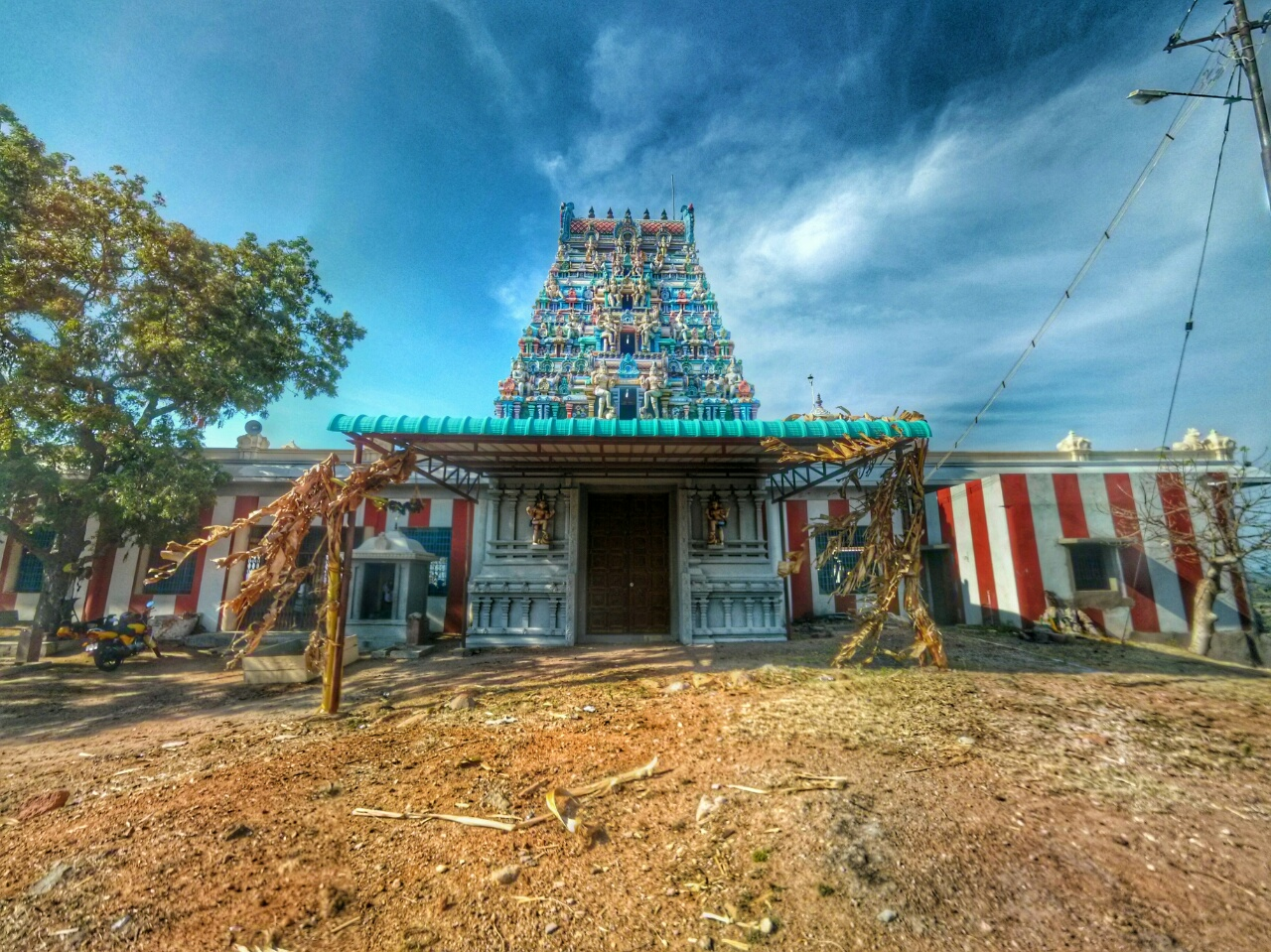
- Sri Malai Marundheeswarar Temple

- Location in Tamil Nadu, India Eriyur (India)
- Coordinates: 10.0389646°N 78.5125496°E
- Country: India
- State: Tamil Nadu
- District: Sivaganga
- Taluk: Singampunari block

Government
  - Type: Grama Panchayat

Population (2011)
  - Total: 2,353

Languages
  - Official: Tamil, English
- Time zone: UTC+5:30 (IST)
- Postal Code: 630566
- Telephone code: 04577
- Lok Sabha constituency: Sivaganga (Lok Sabha constituency)
- State Assembly Constituency: Tiruppattur, Sivaganga

Eriyur is a village in Singampunari Taluk in Sivaganga district of Tamil Nadu, India. It is a large village consisting of two Panchayat villages: Eriyur and Mampatti Devasthanam. The adjoining villages Valayapatti and Ulaginipatti are also administratively and culturally linked to Eriyur.

It is a constituent of the ancient "Mallakottai Nadu" once, which was a part of 'Sivagangai Seemai'.

== Location ==
It is located 26 km North from District headquarters Sivagangai. Other nearby towns are Melur and Tirupathur. It is about 8 km away from Thirukoshtiyur which has one of the 108 Divya desam temples dedicated to Lord Vishnu. Aabatharanapatti ( 2 km ),S.Mampatti ( 4 km ), Namanur ( 9.2 km ), Alavakottai ( 7.1 km ), Kattanipatti ( 9.3 km ), Mallakottai ( 7 km ), Jeyankondanilai(8 km), Madagupatti ( 7.7 km ) are the nearby Villages to Eriyur. It is well connected to Tirupathur, Melur and Madurai by private and Tamil Nadu State Transport bus lines.

== History ==
Eriyur is a modern village with long history and deep links to heritage. It is a constituent of the ancient "Mallakottai Nadu". Main occupation of the people is agriculture and trading.

== Culture ==
Main attraction of the village is the Malai Marundheeeswarar Temple (Tamil: மலை மருந்தீஸ்வரர் ஆலயம்). It is located at the top of the hill on the eastern side of the village. This temple is dedicated to Lord Shiva. "Pankuni Uthiram" festival celebrated in the month of March/ April is the major annual festival in this village. It is a 10-day festival for Lord Muruga situated in the Malai Marundheeswarar temple. This festival attracts devotees from around the villages. Most of the natives living outside of the village returns home to participate in the festival. Another major festival is the Pongal festival in the month of January.
