= Mallakottai =

- Village
- Location in Tamil Nadu Mallakottai (India)
- Coordinates: 10.048768°N 78.464009°E
- Country: India
- State: Tamil Nadu
- District: Sivaganga
- Taluk: Singampunari
- Former name: Mallakottai Nadu

Government
  - Type: Gram Panchayat
  - DMK union secretary: k.balasubramainan(dmk)
- Time zone: UTC+05:30 (IST)
- Pincode(s): 630566
- Area code: 04577
- Vehicle registration: TN-63
- Official language: Tamil
- Spoken languages: Tamil, English, Hindi, Arabi

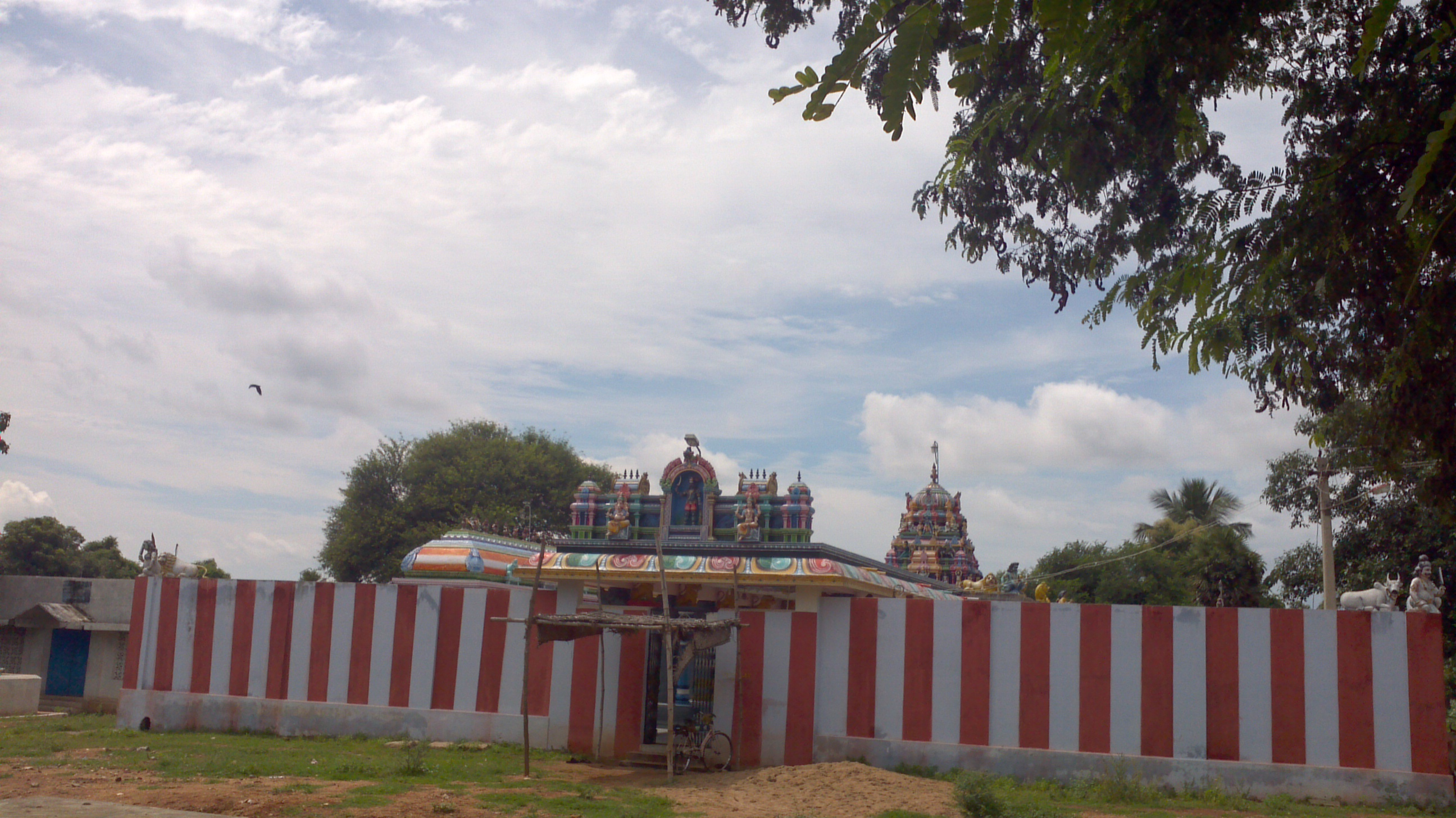
Sri Santhiveeran Temple

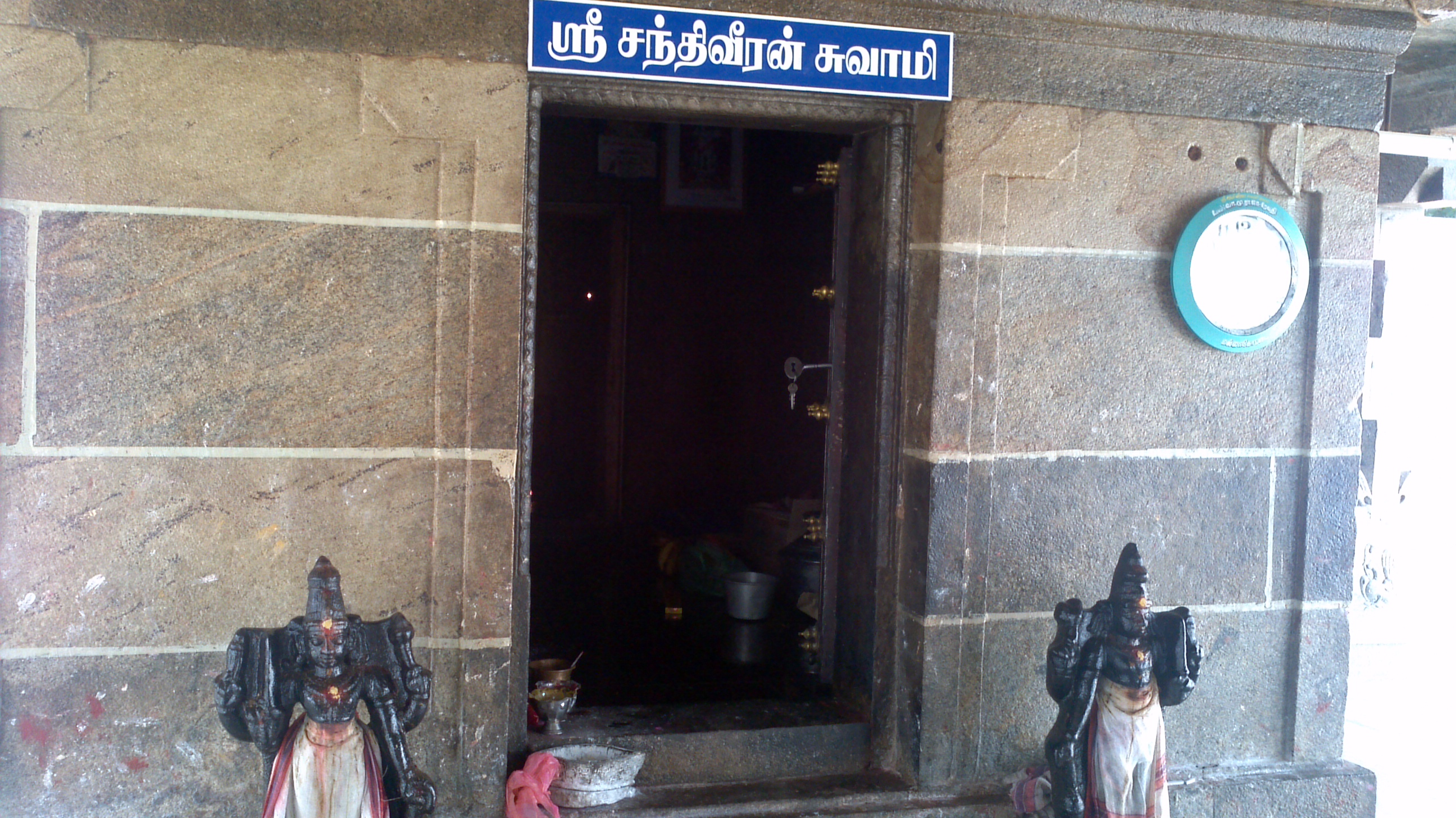
A inside view

Mallakottai is the name of a panchayat village in the Indian state of Tamil Nadu. It was one of the villages of the ancient "Mallakottai Nadu" once, which was a part of 'Sivagangai Seemai'..

== Geography ==
Mallakottai is situated in the northern part of the Sivaganga district.

The village is a commercial center for nearby villages.

Some of the villages which surround Mallakottai are Jeyankondanilai (Sendalai), Vadavanpatti, Mampatti, Erumaipatti, Eriyur and Kattanipatti.

== Economy ==
The principal occupation of villagers is farming and also invested money and doing business in Dubai, Saudi Arabia.

== Culture ==
Two historical temples are found in the village - the "Sri Santhiveeran Temple" and the "Periyakottai Muthayyanar Temple". The presiding deity of this temple is Santhiveeran.

Eruthugattu is an important festival of the Mallakottai village. Many legends are associated with it. The festival predates written history. Eruthugattu is enthusiastically celebrated for thirty days, each with myths, legends and beliefs.

== Transport ==
Mallakottai is approximately 50 minutes from the city of Madurai, traveling through Melur, Keelavalavu and Jayankondanilai from the west. Government bus lines reach the village. The village is one hour from Karaikudi traveling through Thiruppathur, Aralikottai and Eriyur. The village is one hour from the historical city of Maruthu Pandiyar Sivagangai traveling through Madagupatti, Alavakottai, and Kattanipatti and one hour from the "green" town of Singampunari traveling through S.S.Kottai, Nainapatti.

== Infrastructure ==
- Government Hospital with Emergency service
- Water supply Board Controlled by Village Administration
- Government Agricultural Support Office
- Government Head Post Office
- Village Administration Office
- Government Grocery Shop
- BSNL Telecom's Customer Support Office
- Bus Terminals
- Dhiya minimart
- Mega bulemetals
- Raji minerals
- N N L infra

== Education ==
- Government Higher Secondary School
- Government Library Facilities

== Villages ==
- Sethamallipatti
- Otapatti
- Kovilpatti
- Mottamallipatti
- Vadaikavalavu
