= Mampatti =

- Village
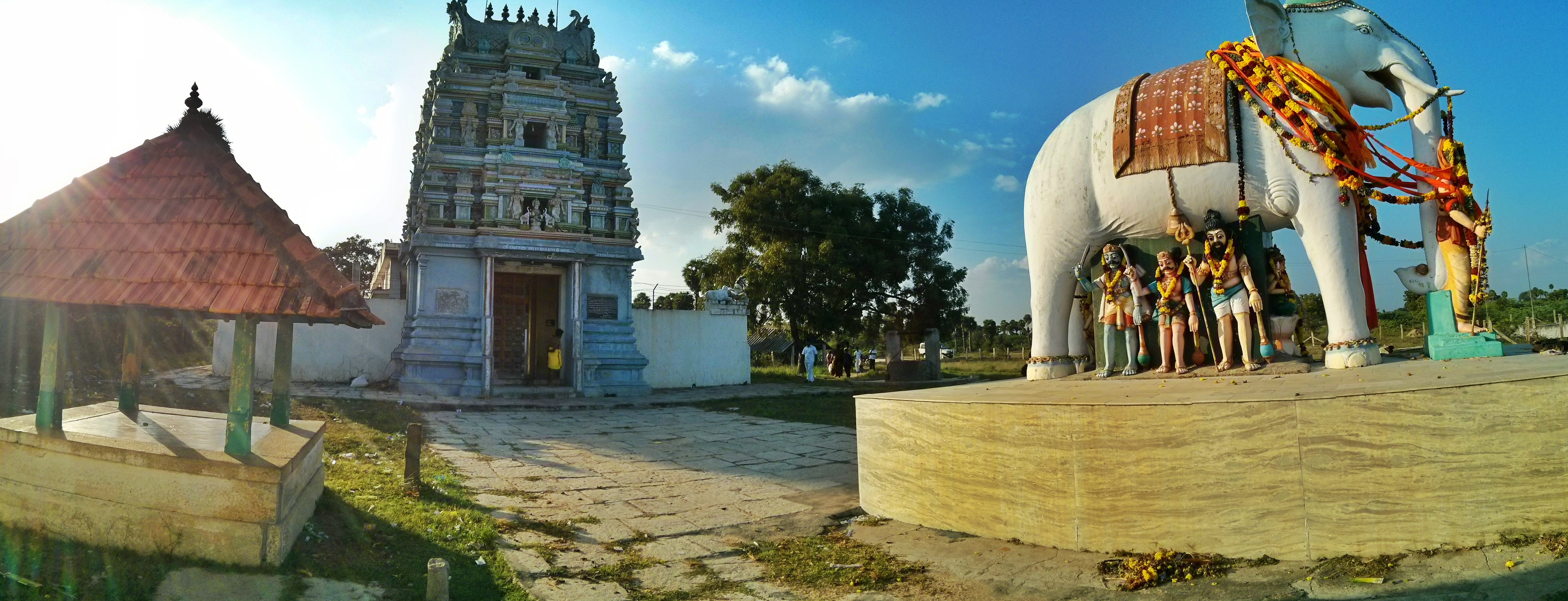
- Sri Kadukavalar Temple

- Location in Tamil Nadu, India Mampatti (India)
- Coordinates: 10.053406°N 78.493411°E
- Country: India
- State: Tamil Nadu
- District: Sivaganga
- Taluk: Singampunari

Government
  - Type: Grama Panchayat

Languages
  - Official: Tamil, English
- Time zone: UTC+5:30 (IST)
- Postal Code: 630566
- Telephone code: 04577
- Lok Sabha constituency: Sivaganga (Lok Sabha constituency)
- State Assembly Constituency: Tiruppattur (state assembly constituency, Sivaganga)

Mampatti is a village in Singampunari Taluk in Sivagangai District of Tamil Nadu State, India. It comes under Mampatti South panchayath union. It is a constituent of the ancient "Mayilrayan kottai Nadu" once, which was a part of 'Sivagangai Seemai'. For administrative purpose, the whole Mampatti region was divided into three Revenue Villages namely South Mampatti, North Mampatti and Mampatti Devasthanam, each under the authority of a Village Administrative Officer. Mampatti Devasthanam is the region that covers the land of temples that belongs to Sivagangai Samasthanam Devasthanam.

== Location ==
It is located 43 km North from District headquarters Sivagangai. Other nearby towns are Melur and Tirupathur. It is about 10 km away from Thirukoshtiyur which has one of the 108 Divya Desam temples dedicated to Lord Vishnu. Vishnu here called as Sowmya Narayana Perumal. Also it is about 19 km away from Pattamangalam which has one of the famous Guru temples dedicated to Lord Dakshinamurthy. It is well connected to Tirupathur, Melur and Madurai by private and Tamil Nadu State Transport bus lines.

== History and people ==
Agriculture is the predominant occupation in Mampatti. Local agriculture primarily depends on seasonal rainfall and the water coming through the river 'ManiMuthar'. Close to South Mampatti, there are 11 more villages situated which are administered and culturally linked to South Mampatti. The names of the 11 villages are 'Oppilanpatti, Santhirapatti, Thumbaipatti, Idaiyapatti, Kilukiluppaipatti, Thirupathipatti, M.Valaiyapatti, Kachapatti, Kalungupatti, Thoppupatti and Indira nagar'. Among this South Mampatti is the mother village for all (Tamil: தாய்க் கிராமம்).

Mampatti never celebrates Diwali. For residents of the villages, Diwali has never been an occasion for celebration. For the past six decades, the villagers have shunned the festival. The reason behind this is that they faced a severe drought on that period. Additionally, the festival occurs at the wrong time of the year during October and November, when residents are typically in the midst of Samba Season during which they incur agricultural expenses.

While the entire village was suffering due to drought and agricultural expenses, a few affluent families celebrated the festival. This action hurt many of the people in villages, particularly the kids. Afterward, residents decided not to celebrate it, by swears to the village deity Sri Kadukavalar Swamy. Everyone in the villages strictly adheres to the resolution adopted during a village meeting held in 1958 headed by the Ambalakarar(President of an assembly)'Sevugan Ambalam' in order to maintain unity among villagers. Even those who moved from the village to settle elsewhere have not violated this unwritten diktat of the village.

Many youths from villages havd been forced to move to foreign countries for survival, as monsoon rains in the region have been poor for a prolonged time. Recently, the villagers' economic condition improved to some extent, but they continued to shun celebrations. Youth who marry girls from this village are told about the practice in advance so that they do not expect to be honored during 'Thalai diwali'(Tamil: தலை தீபாவளி), the first diwali after marriage. However, the villagers celebrate Pongal in a grand manner wearing new clothes and preparing sweet Pongal along with the engagement of a bull taming sport called Manju Virattu(Tamil: மஞ்சு விரட்டு).

Apart from the above, Goat rearing(Tamil: வெள்ளாடு வளர்ப்பு) is also prohibited here in order to protect and safeguard smaller plants, flags and trees around the villages to preserve the village ecosystem. Only 'Sheep' culture(Tamil: செம்மறியாடு வளர்ப்பு) is allowed here.

== Geography ==
The rivers and tunnels flooding through this area get the source of water from the tropical forest of Alagar Hills and Sirumalai Reserved Forest.

== Economy ==
Agriculture is the predominant occupation of Mampatti.

== Culture/Cityscape ==
=== Landmarks ===
==== Sri Kadukavalar Swamy Temple ====
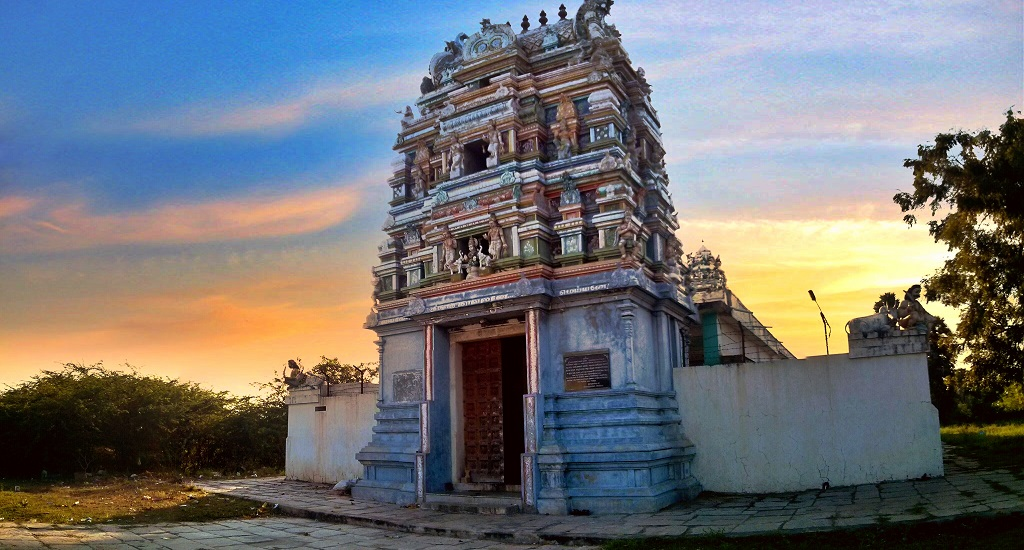
Sri Kadukavalar temple during sunset

Main attraction of this region is "Sri Kadukavalar Swamy Temple"(Tamil: திரு காடுகாவலர் சுவாமி திருக்கோவில்). The Deity of this temple is called "Kadukavalar Swamy" (Tamil: காடுகாவலர் சுவாமி)which is situated in the middle of 12 villages. As every village deity, this too situated in-between the shore of a Rivulet called 'ManiMuthar' and Lakes that running through the villages for cultivation.

==== Karanthamalai Aiyanar Temple ====
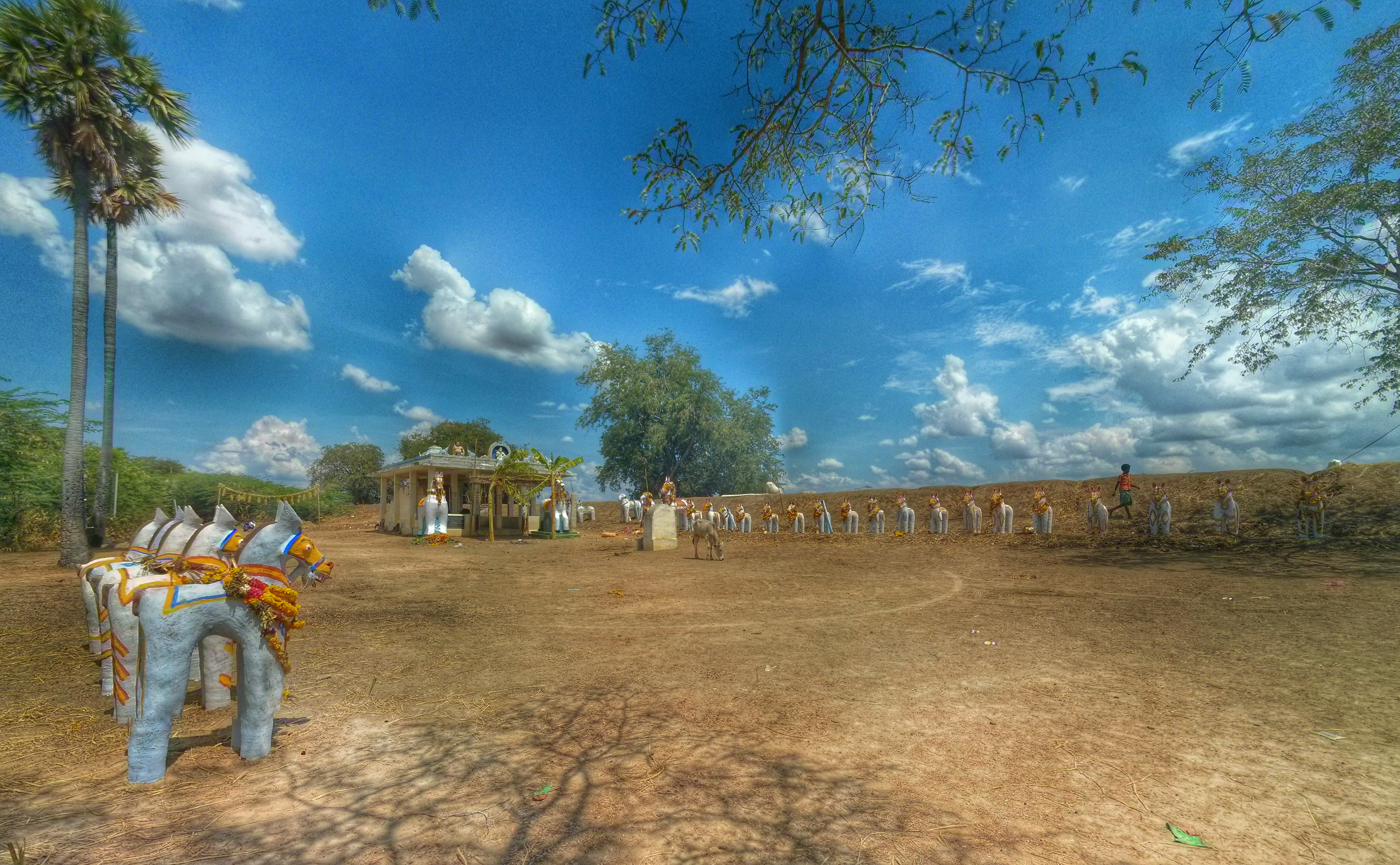
Sri Karanthamalai Aiyanar Temple

'Puravi Eduppu' is the festival that will be conducted once in every 3 years for this temple.

==== Chola Vinayagar and Choleswarar Temple ====
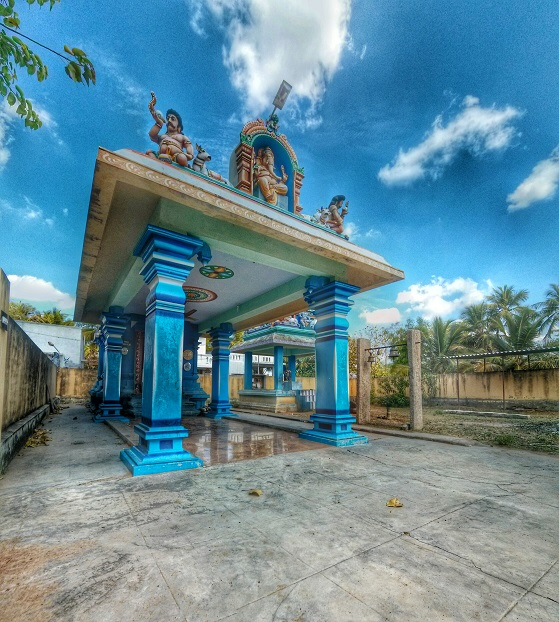
Sri Chola Vinayagar Temple

Chola Vinayagar/Cholesvarar Temple is a Hindu temple with deity Lord Ganapathy. This ancient temple comes under the Jurisdiction of 'Sivagangai Samasthanam Devasthanam'(Tamil: சிவகங்கை சமஸ்தான தேவஸ்தானம்) which is administered by the Rani of Sivagangai, 'Sahiba Madurantaki Nachiar'.

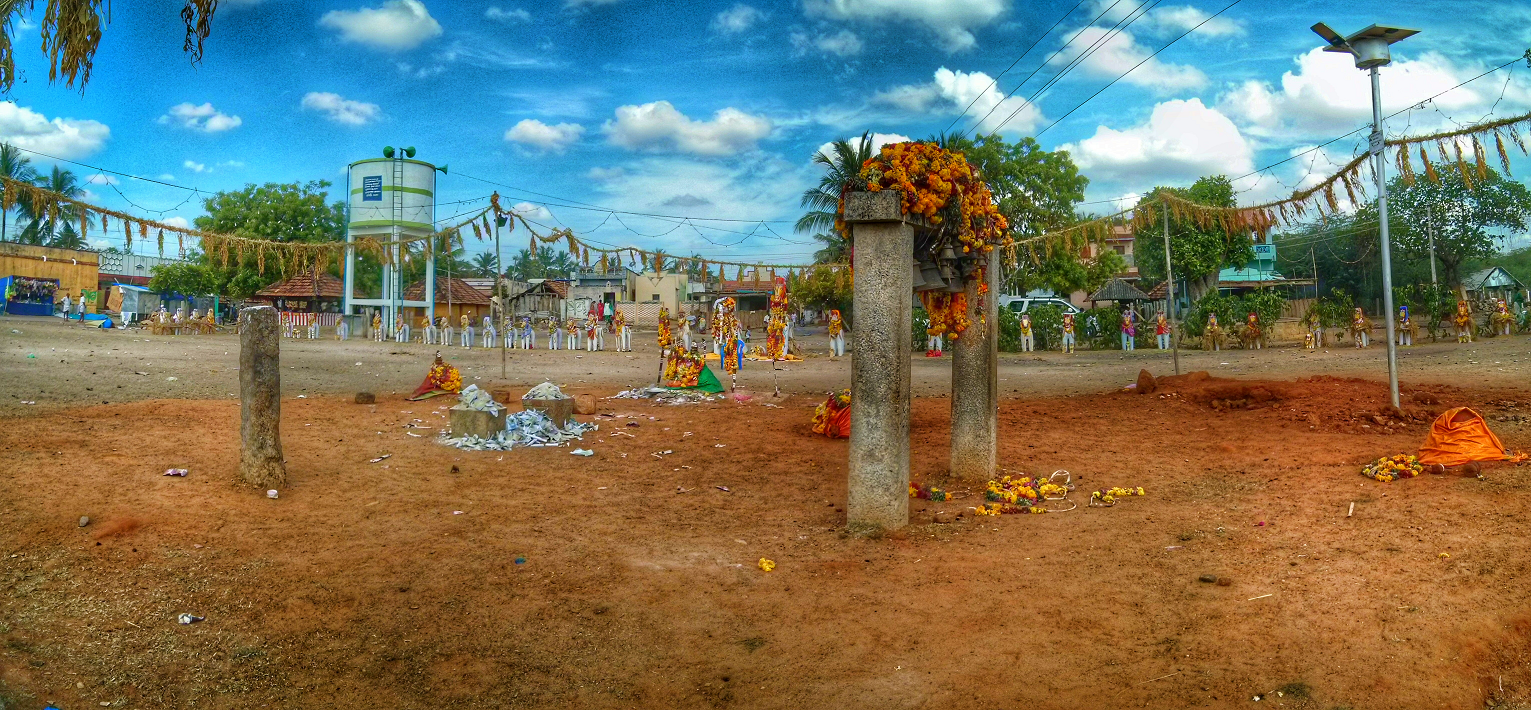
Manthaiya Ayya Temple in front of Village Courtyard

Another temple located in front of a village courtyard is 'Manthaiya Ayya'. The people entering into the village will worship this deity first.

=== Festivals ===
==== Vaikasi Thiruvizha ====
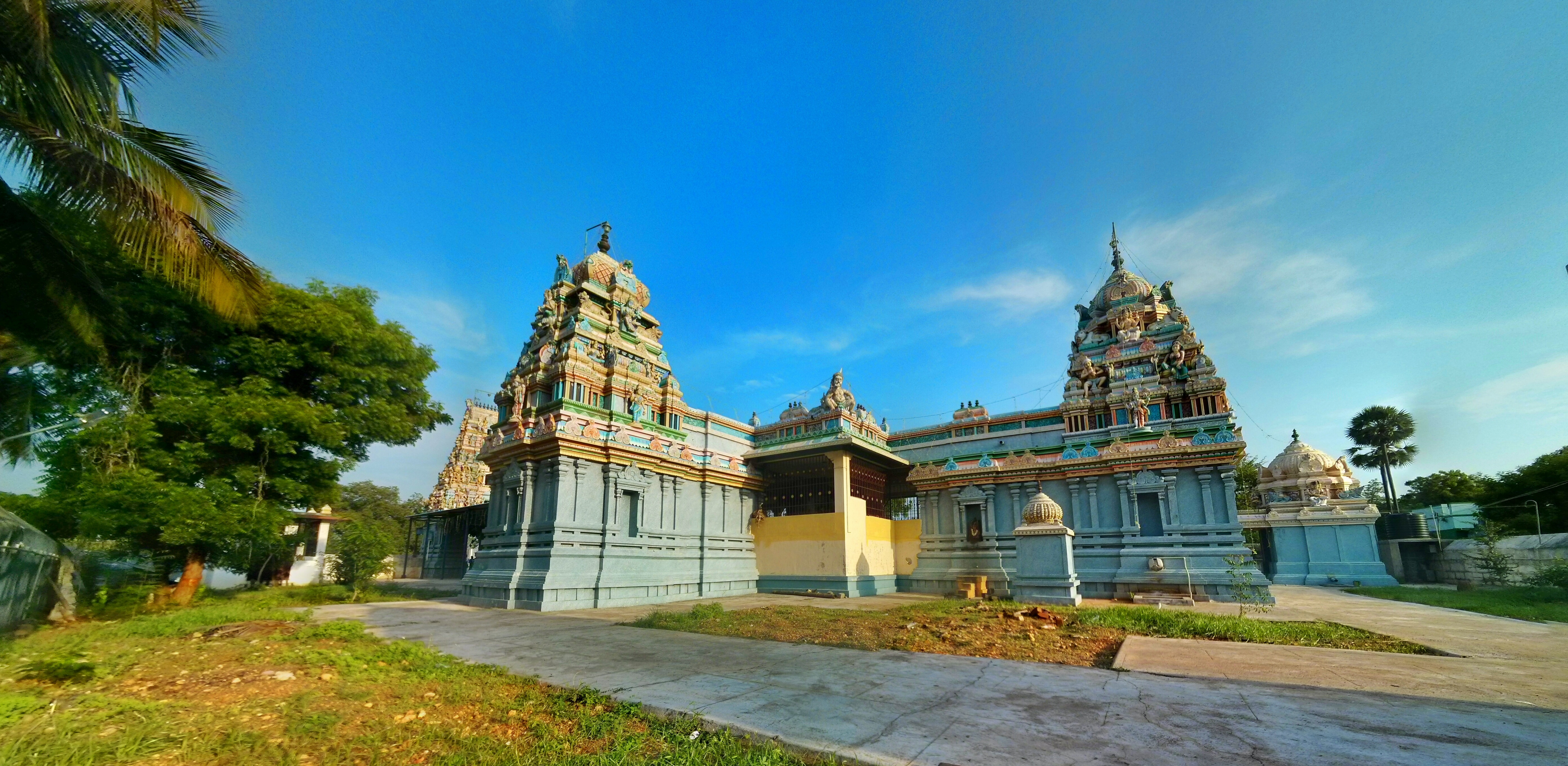
Sri Piriya Vidai Nayanar and Ponna Vidai Selvi Temple

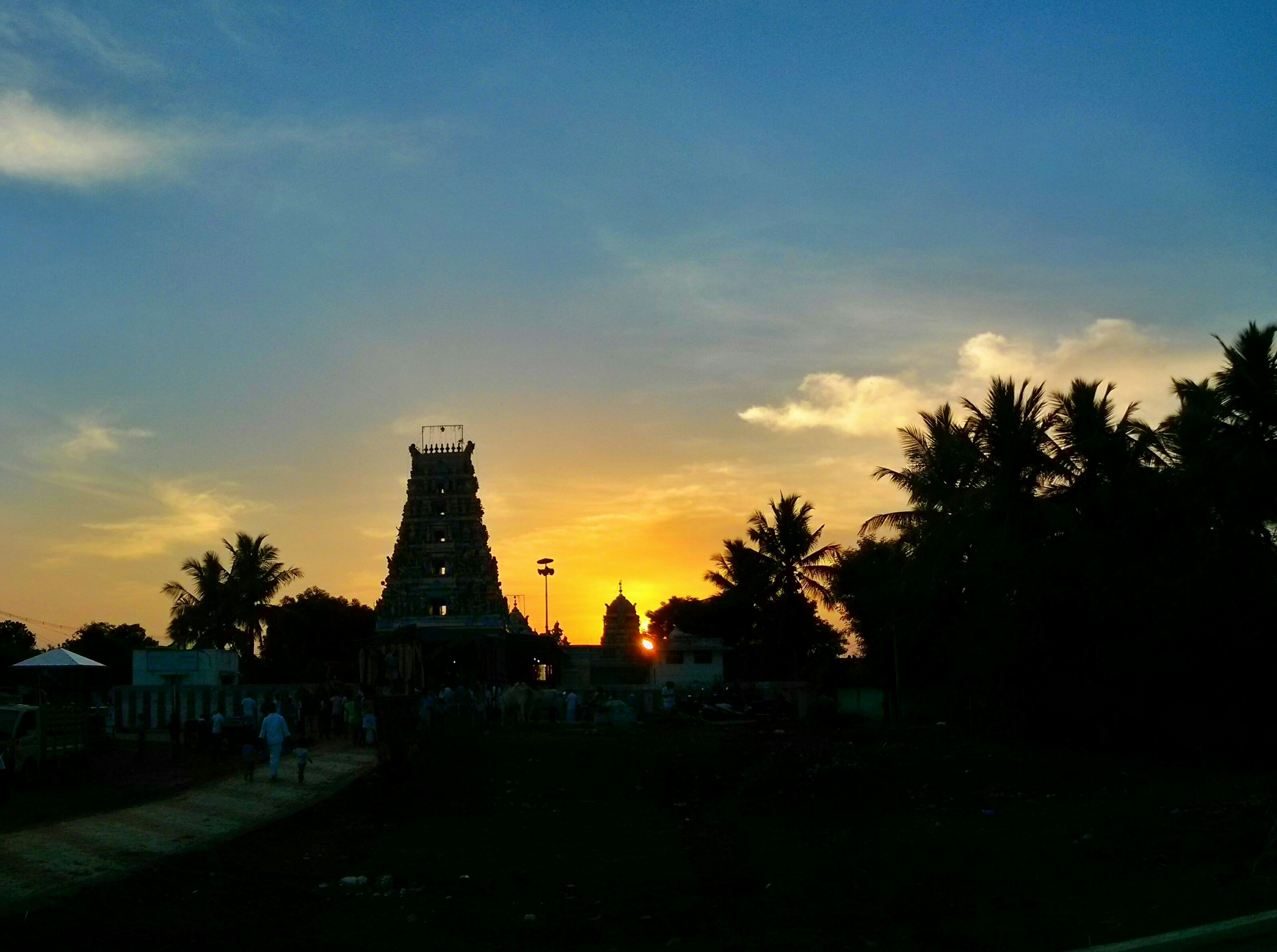
Silhouette image of Piriya Vidai Nayanar and Ponna Vidai Selvi Temple during Sunset

"Vaikasi Thiruvizha"(Tamil: வைகாசித் திருவிழா) festival celebrated every year in the month of May/June is one of the major annual festival in this village. It is a 5 days festival for Deities Lord "Piriya Vidai Nayanar(Shiva)" and Lordess "Ponnavidai Selvi(Parvathi)" situated in Vadavanpatti(Tamil: வடவன்பட்டி) village. This ancient temple comes under the Jurisdiction of 'Sivagangai Samasthanam Devasthanam'. Deities will be carried through the villages towards the river 'ManiMuthar' that flows near the village Oppilanpatti in order for a 'Ganga Snanam'. This festival attracts devotees from around the villages. Most of the natives living outside of the village returns home to participate in the festival.

==== Pongal ====
Pongal (Tamil: பொங்கல் பண்டிகை), a harvest festival of Tamils which is celebrated on January. As an agriculture based civilization the harvest plays an important part in this region. The farmer cultivating his land depends on cattle, timely rain and the Sun. Once a year, he expresses his gratitude to these during the harvest festival, thanking the Sun God for agricultural abundance. This festival, Pongal, falls typically on the 14th or 15 January and is the quintessential 'Tamil Festival', a traditional occasion for giving thanks to nature. Families will gather to rejoice and share their joy with others. This is the major festival celebrated in this region which brings the natives back home.

On the day of Pongal, the puja is performed when rice is boiled in milk in an earthenware pot and is then symbolically offered to the sun-god along with other oblations. In accordance with the appointed ritual a turmeric plant is tied round the pot in which the rice will be boiled. The offerings include the sticks of sugar-cane in background and coconut and bananas in the dish.

Next day celebration is Mattu Pongal(Tamil: மாட்டுப்பொங்கல்), the day of Pongal for Cows and bulls. Multi-colored beads, tinkling bells, sheaves of corn and flower garlands are tied around the neck of the cattle and then are worshiped. They are fed with Pongal and Arati is performed on them, so as to ward off the evil eye. As Diwali is shunned in this region, this day festival will be celebrated in a grand manner, with bull taming sport called Manju Virattu(Tamil: மஞ்சு விரட்டு) at the end of the day.

Tying a 'Salli'(copper coin)(Tamil: சல்லிக்காசு) on the foreheads of the bulls, trained specially for this, the bulls are set loose. The competitors then try to capture the fierce bulls. The Tamil literature and the famous grammar Tolkappiyam(Tamil: தொல்காப்பியம்) which is created in the ancient Sangam period mentioned this sport as "Eru Taluvuthal"(Tamil: ஏறு தழுவுதல்).

==== Puravi Eduppu ====
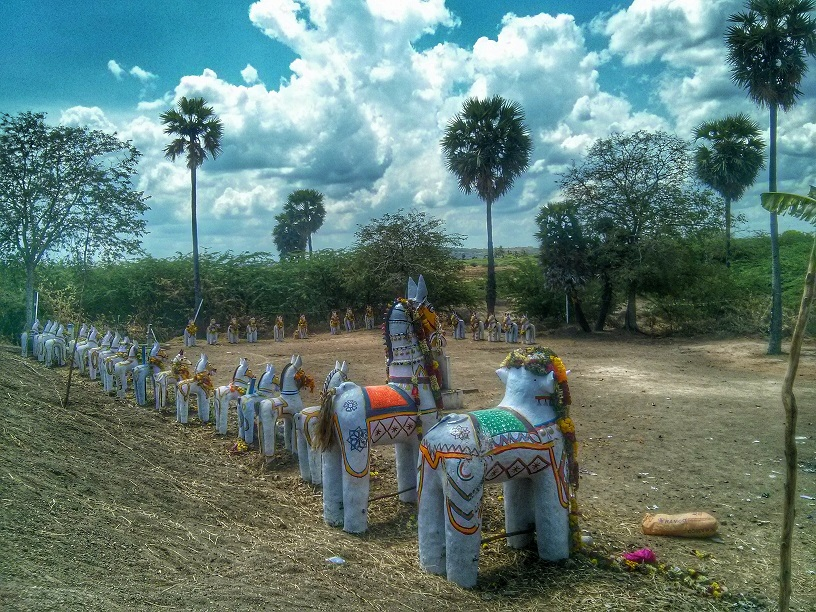
Karanthamalai Aiyanar Temple – 'Puravi Eduppu'

'Puravi Eduppu'(Tamil: புரவி எடுப்பு திருவிழா) is a festival beseeching the rain gods for their mercy. This is the festival taken for the deity Karanthamalai Aiyanar who protects the rural villages and their families. The festival of Aiyanar is decided upon by the entire village. The clay horse statues eyes are opened and then carried at a fast pace to the temple, where they receive a place in front of the old statues. This terracotta horses seen inside the compound are given to the god in order to walk around his territory on night time to assert and record its boundaries.

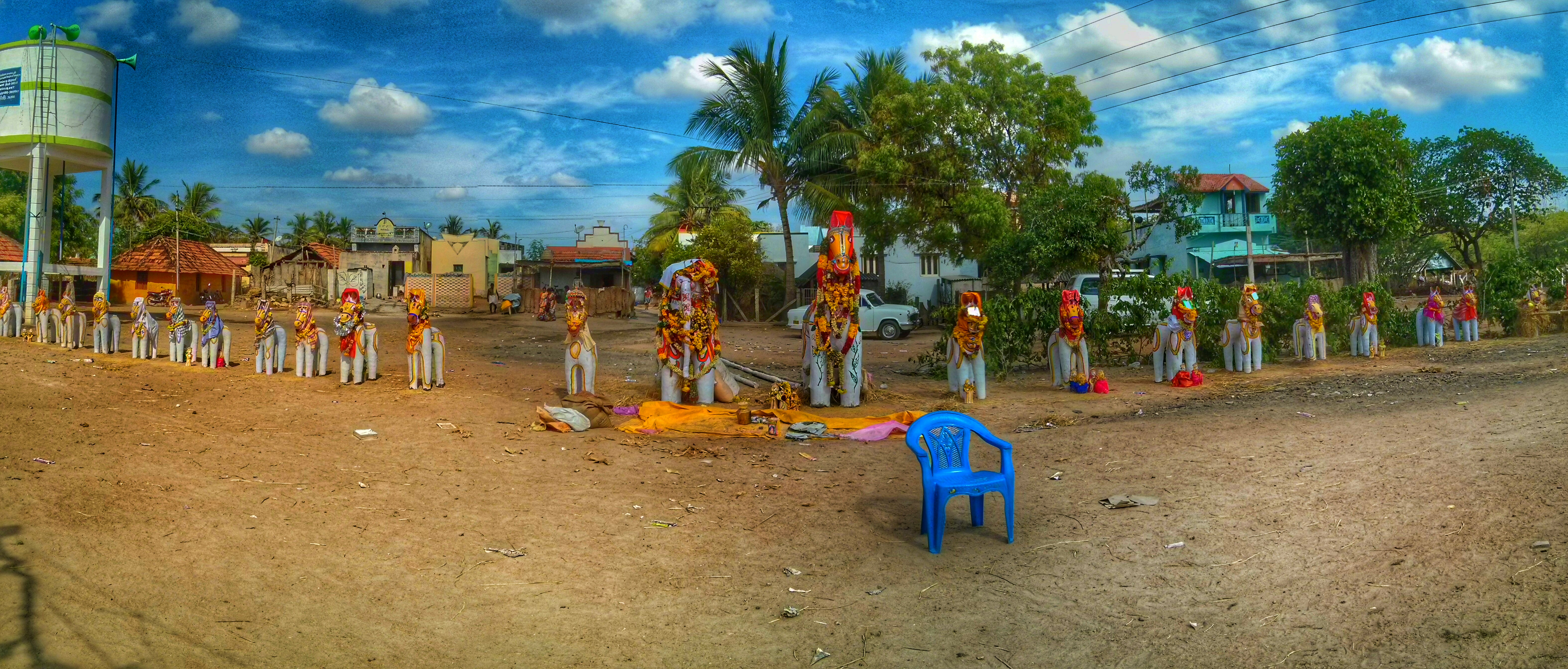
South Mampatti Village – During 'Puravi Eduppu' Festival

==== Sevvai Pongal ====
‘Sevvai Pongal’(Tamil: செவ்வாய்ப் பொங்கல்) is a traditional community festival celebrated on the last Tuesday of Tamil month 'Karthigai'(mid-November to mid-December). This will happen in the entire 'MayilrayanKottai Nadu' region, which is another annual occasion for villagers to come together.

All the community members come together to make 'White Pongal' to offer worship for the deity 'Amman', in order to protect 'Crops' and 'Plants' in the Paddy Fields. Though the worship is for God, the occasion will happen in front of a square shed raised platform, which will be seen in most of the villages. This open 'dais' normally built in front of a house, temple or a village for general use. It is the property of the entire community and a Place of public assembly of the village. The peoples in the village will gather at this common place for sitting and gathering. In Tamil language this is called as "Savukkai/Chavadi(சவுக்கை/சாவடி)."

Apart from making pongal, in some villages devotees will make Mavilakku, a rice made flour with milk and coconut, offering for the Goddess to appease her and to get her blessings.
