= Veppan Valasu =

Coordinates: 10°32′21″N 77°35′09″E

Veppan valasu is a small village in Melakkottai Panjayat, Palani Taluk, Dindigul District, Tamil Nadu, India.

== History ==
The exact history of this village is unknown. The village has many margosa (or neem ) trees which in Tamil called as Veppa maram and Valasu means a small village, so it may be called as "Veppa mara valasu and in turn Veppanvalasu.

== Climate ==
The village is in a region of extreme heat and low humidity. The north east monsoon provides the bulk of rainfall during the months of October and November. The north east monsoon, which starts in June and lasting until mid August, provides showers and makes the region relatively cooler than in other months.

== Places ==
The entire village has only few streets and 3 areas Parted as North side of the Bus stop, South side of Bus stop and the new colony at the entrance of the Village. Temples at Veppanvalasu, Ganesh Temple Kaliamman Temple Lord Siva Temple Perumal Temple (on small hills, located 1 km away from the village)

== Education ==
The village people has been giving much importance to education. There is one Primary panchayat union school available and for high schools the students have to travel near by villages about 3 km to reach either RC High school, Vedikaram valasu or Saraswathi High school, Amarapoondi. ITO High School, 9 km away from village. And for colleges the students have to travel 16 Kilometers to nearby town Palani. Colleges at Palani. A.P.A arts and science college / APA poly technique and APA college for women . The village has only little educated and very little group of Graduates earlier. But for the past 2 decades many became qualified as Graduates / Engineering Graduates. Many are employed around various states and even working in USA / Canada.

== Work and life ==
All the people are related with Agriculture and related works. The crops they cultivate are: maize, groundnut, sunflower, vegetables, sesame, guava, gooseberry and coconut.

This village has a very small population (around 5000).
