= Ottakkovilpatti =

- Village
- Location within Tamil Nadu
- Coordinates: 10.179572°N 78.344701°E
- Country: India
- State: Tamil Nadu
- District: Madurai district
- Taluk: Melur

Government
  - Type: Village
  - Body: Kottampatti
- Time zone: UTC+5:30 (IST)
- PIN: 625 101
- Telephone Code: 0452

Ottakkovilpatti is a village located in Madurai District in the State of Tamil Nadu, India. The village is 22 km from Melur and 50 km from Madurai.

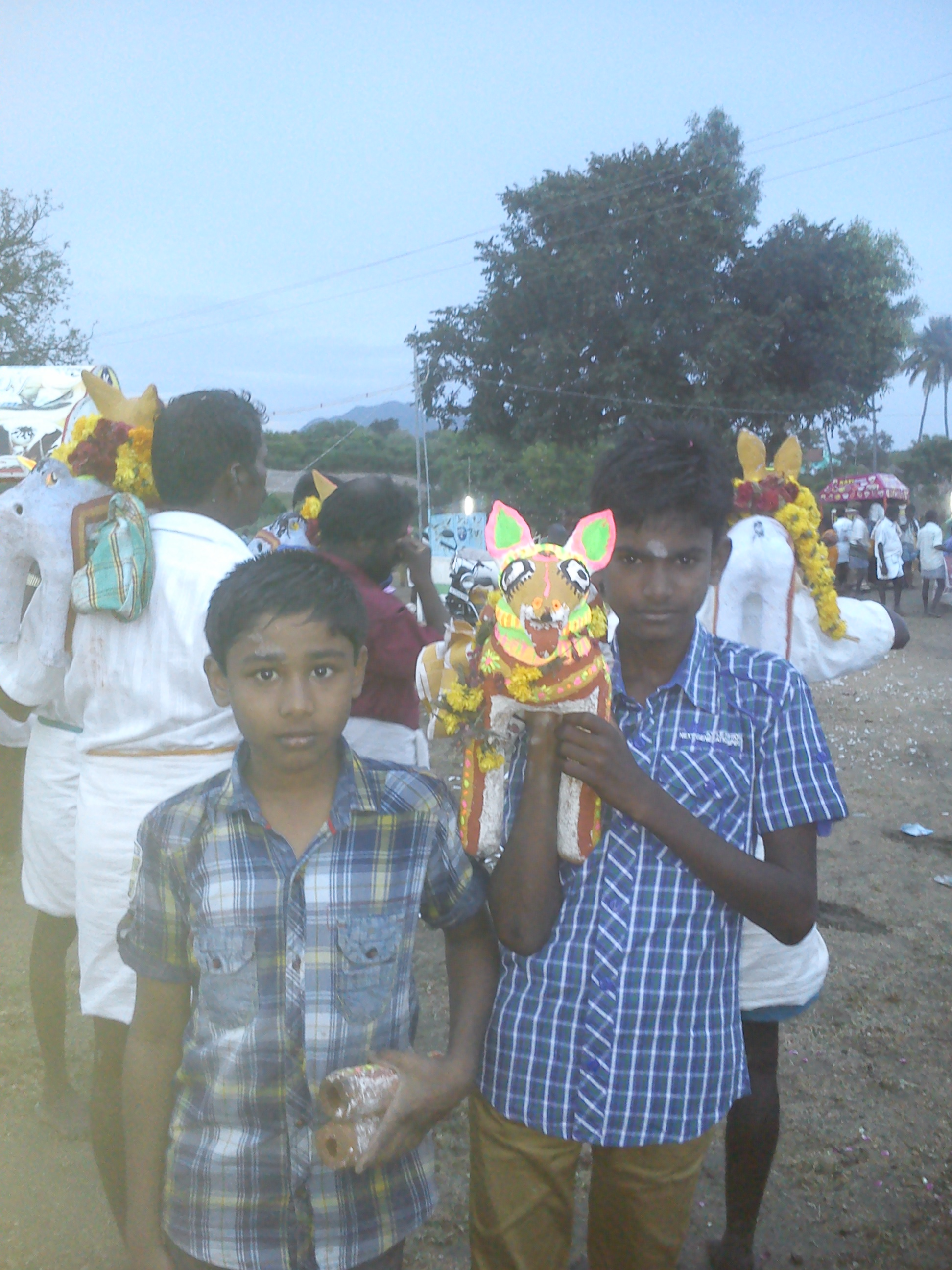
Kottapuli Dinesh Festival celebration
