= Sowmya Narayana Perumal temple =

Perumal temple in Sivaganga district, Tamil Nadu, India

Sowmyanarayana Perumal Temple
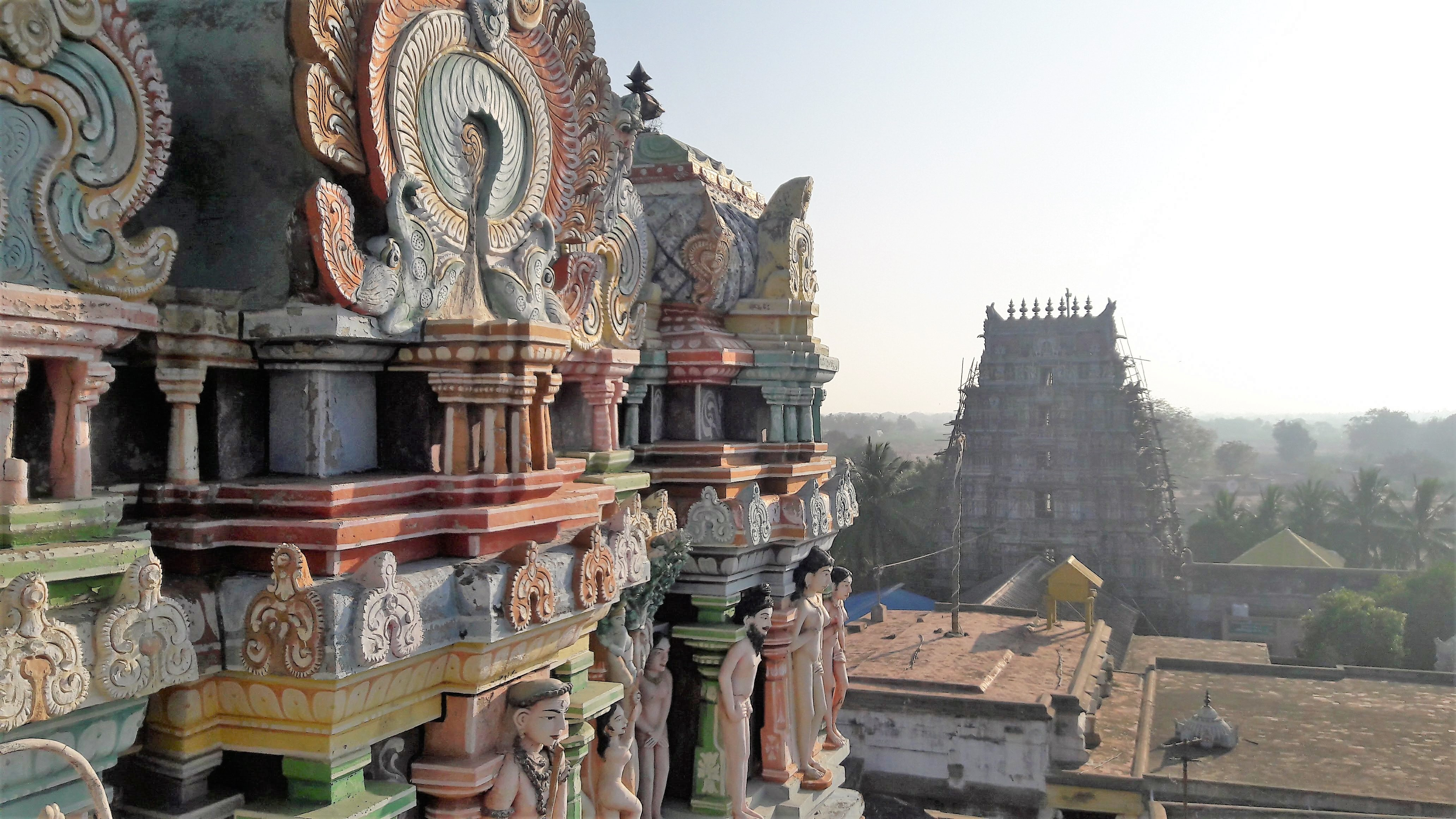
- Image of the temple gopuram

- Location in Tamil Nadu

Religion
- Affiliation: Hinduism
- District: Sivaganga district
- Deity: Sowmyanarayana Perumal (Vishnu); Thirumaamagal Thayar (Lakshmi)
- Features: Tower: Ashtanga Vimanam

Location
- Location: Thirukoshtiyur
- State: Tamil Nadu
- Country: India
- Interactive map of Sowmyanarayana Perumal Temple
- Coordinates: 10°03′39″N 78°33′36″E

Architecture
- Type: Dravidian architecture

Sowmyanarayana Perumal Temple is an ancient temple located in Thirukoshtiyur, a village in the South Indian state of Tamil Nadu, dedicated to the Hindu god Vishnu. Constructed in the Dravidian style of architecture, the temple is glorified in the Nalayira Divya Prabandham, the early medieval Tamil canon of the Alvar saints from the 6th–9th centuries CE. It is one of the 108 Divya Desams dedicated to Vishnu, who is worshipped as Sowmyanarayana Perumal and his consort Lakshmi as Thirumamagal. The temple is known as the place where Ramanuja, the expounder of Vishishtadvaita philosophy preached the holy ashtakshara "Om Namo Narayanaya" to all people, irrespective of their varna.

A granite wall surrounds the temple, enclosing all its shrines. The temple features a five-tiered rajagopuram or, the gateway tower and an impressive Ashtanga Vimana, which is even taller than the gopuram itself.The temple tank is located opposite to the temple, outside the main entrance.

Sowmyanarayana Perumal is believed to have appeared as Narasimha avatar to the devas, the celestial deities. The temple follows Tenkalai tradition of worship. Six daily rituals and many yearly festivals are held at the temple, of which the float festival during the Tamil month of Masi (February–March), Navrathri during September–October and Vaikunta Ekadasi during Margali (December–January) being the most prominent. The temple is maintained and administered by Sivaganga Devasthanam.

== Legend ==
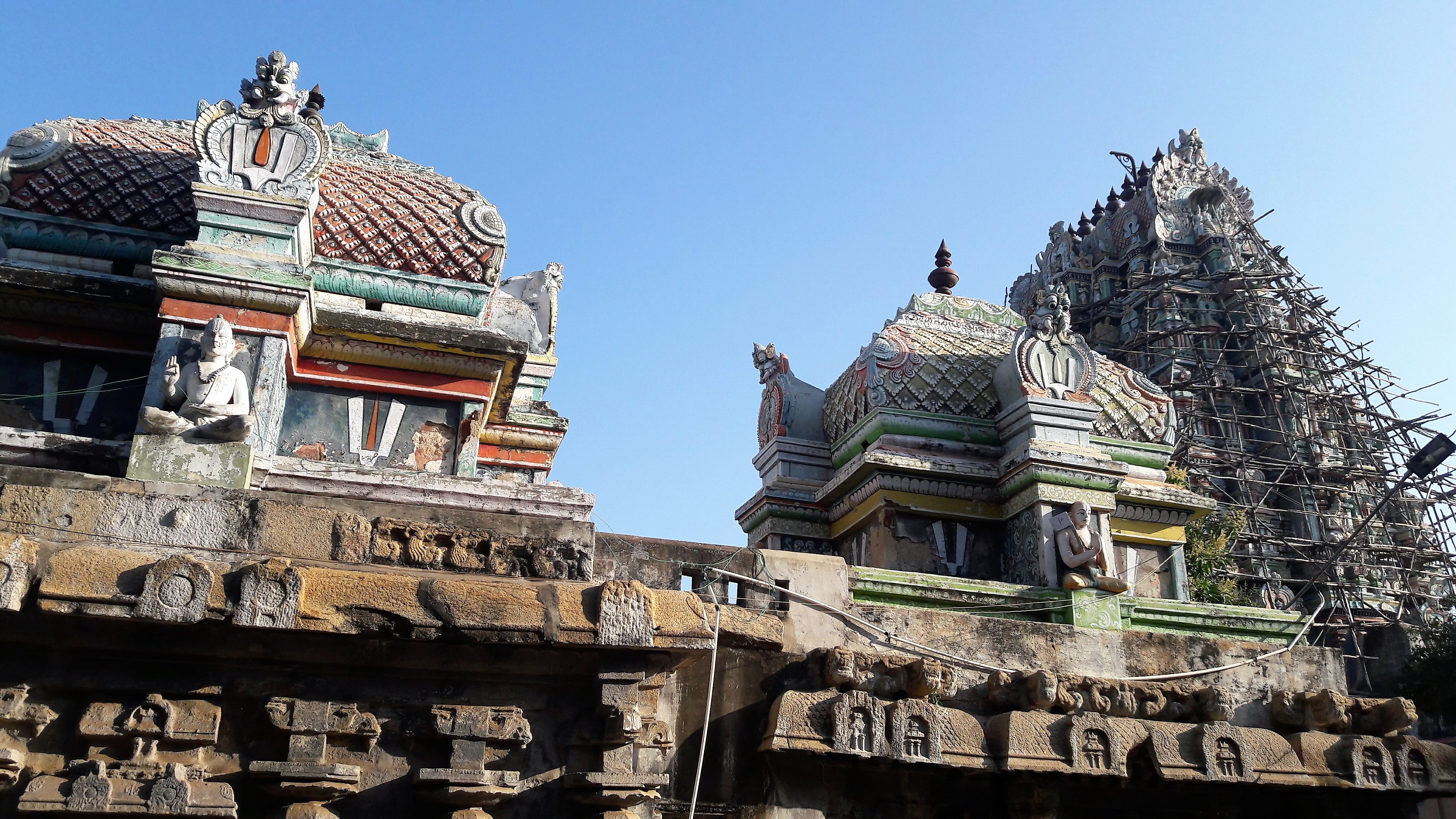
Shrines in the temple

Hiranyakshipu, the asura king, got arrogant after he got boons from Brahma, which nearly made him invincible. He troubled the devas (celestial deities) and they prayed to Vishnu for rescue. Vishnu was ready to take the Narasimha avatar to slay the asura king. The devas pleaded with Vishnu to assume the form before he could take it. Vishnu showed them the avatar, but not satisfied merely one vision, the devas and sages pleaded with him to show it again. Vishnu appeared in three forms of himself standing, sitting, and resting posture at Thirukoshtiur. Since, Vishnu showed his form after hardship (called Thirukkai in Tamil) of Devas, the place came to be known as Thirukoshtiur.

== Architecture ==
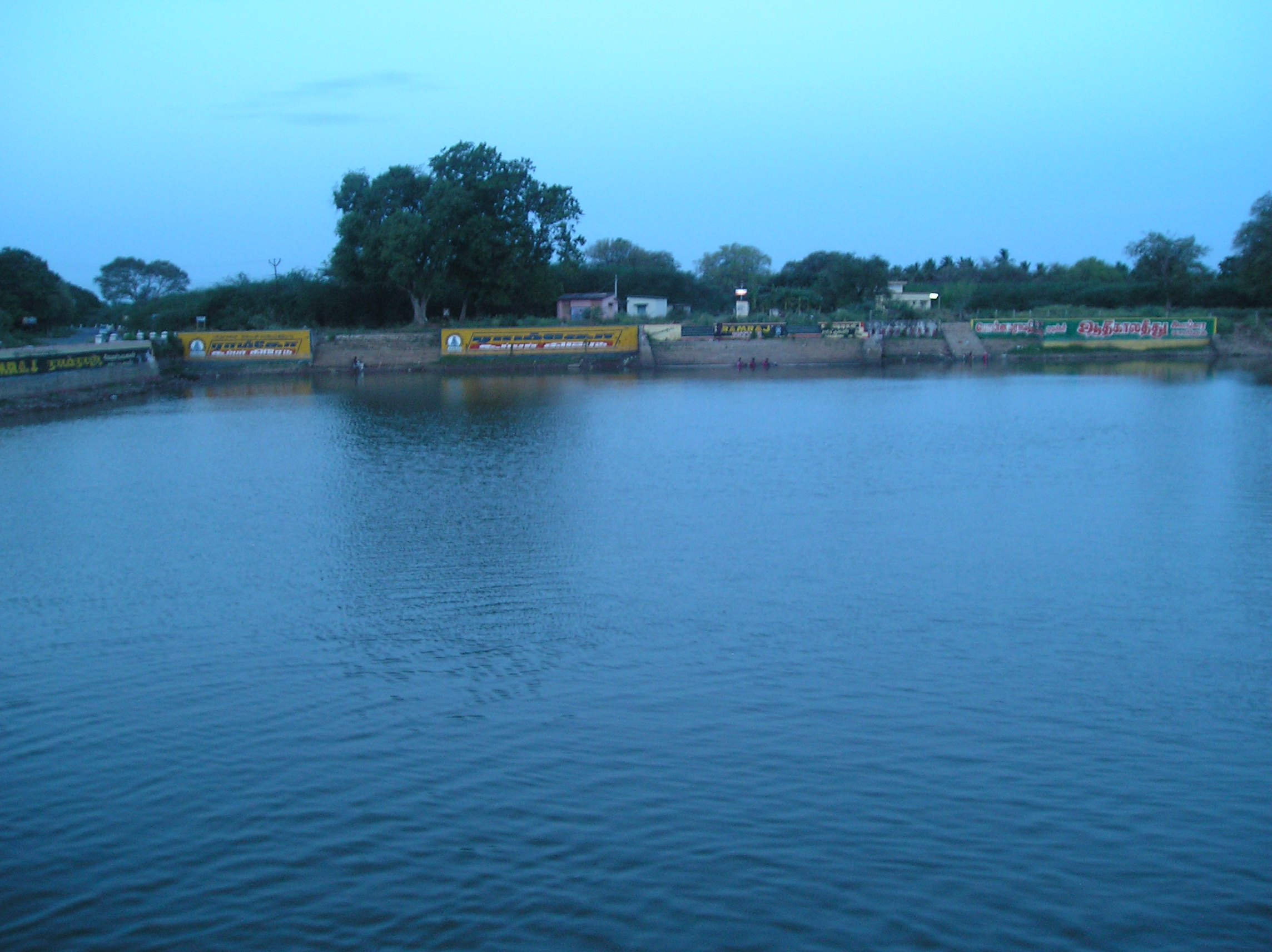
Temple tank outside the temple

Sowmyanarayana Perumal temple covers an area of about 2 acres (0.81 hectares) and has a five-tiered gopuram (gateway tower). The temple in enclosed in a rectangular enclosure with huge granite walls. The central shrine houses the image of the presiding deity, Uragamellayan Perumal in reclining posture on a snake bed similar to that of Srirangam Ranganathaswamy temple. The images of Sridevi and Bhudevi are also housed in the sanctum. There two life size images of Narasimha, the avatar of Vishnu. One of them is shown holding the asura Hiranyakshipu and other slaying him. Though it is a Vishnu temple, the temple has image of Shiva in the form of Lingam, Vinayaka and Subramanya. The festival deity is named Sowmya Narayana Perumal made of panchaloha.

The vimana, the shrine over the sanctum is Ashtanga in architecture, which has eight parts, namely, Adhistana (base), three Padas (struct), Prashthana (limb), Griva (leading struct), Shikara (cylindrical holder) and Stupi (top portion). The outer parts of the vimana has various stucco images of Narasimha, sages, Dasavatara and other mythical stories. The Ashtanga Vimana is found in only three places, namely, the Uthiramerur, Koodal alagar Temple and Cheranmadevi temples. The ashtanga vimana raising to a height of 25 m (82 ft), is taller than the gopuram of the temple, which is not a common feature in Dravidian temples.

The shrine of the consort of Sowmyanarayana Perumal, Thirumamagal, is located to the south of the main shrine. There are smaller shrines of Lakshmi Narasimha, Rama, Lakshmi Narayana and Krishna located close to the sanctum. The shrines of Andal, Narasimha and Manavala Mamunigal are found in separate shrines around the first precinct. The shrines of Garuda, Anjaneya, Ramanuja, Vedanta Desika and Alvars are found in the second precinct. According to historian K.V. Soundararajan, the Rangantha temples in South India built during the 9th and 10th centuries have a systematic arrangement of subsidiary deities as seen in this temple along with the Appakkudathaan Perumal Temple at Koviladi, Veeraraghava Perumal temple at Thiruvallur, Rajagopalaswamy temple at Mannargudi and Rangantha temple at Srirangapatna.

== Religious significance ==
Sowmyanarayana Perumal temple is revered in Naalayira Divya Prabhandam, the 7th–9th century Vaishnava canon, by Perialvar, Thirumalisai Alvar, Bhoothathalvar, and Peyalvar. The temple is classified as a Divya Desam, one of the 108 Vishnu temples that are mentioned in the book. During the 18th and 19th centuries, the temple finds mention in several works like 108 Tirupathi Anthathi by Divya Kavi Pillai Perumal Aiyangar.

The temple is known as the place where Ramanuja, the expounder of Vaishnavadatta philosophy preached the holy ashtakshara "Om Namo Narayana" to all people. The place was the birthplace of Thirukoshtiyur Nambigal, the teacher of Ramanuja and who taught him the gospel and instructed him not to reveal it to anyone. Taking the risk of his life, Ramanuja climbed up the temple and revealed the verse to the whole world. Nambigal was pleased by the spirit of Ramanuja and named him Emperumanar (meaning my superior). Following the event, a life-size image of Ramanuja was housed in the Ashtanga Mandapam of the temple.

== Religious practices and festival ==
The temple follows the traditions of the Tenkalai sect of Vaishnavite tradition and follows Vaikanasa aagama. In modern times, the temple priests perform the pooja (rituals) during festivals and on a daily basis. As at other Vishnu temples of Tamil Nadu, the priests belong to the Vaishnavaite community, of the Brahmin varna. Six daily rituals are held at various times of the day and many yearly festivals are held at the temple, of which the float festival during the Tamil month of Masi (February–March), Navaratri during September–October and Vaikuntha Ekadashi during Margali (December–January) being the most prominent. There are weekly, monthly and fortnightly rituals performed in the temple.
