= Singampunari block =

- Revenue block
- Location in Tamil Nadu, India
- Coordinates: 10°12′03″N 78°25′05″E
- Country: India
- State: Tamil Nadu
- District: Sivaganga

Population (2001)
  - Total: 16,415

Languages
  - Official: Tamil
- Time zone: UTC+5:30 (IST)

Singampunari is a revenue block in the Sivaganga district of Tamil Nadu, India. It has a total of 30 panchayat villages.

== Demographics ==
As of 2001 India census, Singampunari had a population of 16,415. Males constitute 50% of the population and females 50%. Singampunari has an average literacy rate of 71%, higher than the national average of 59.5%: male literacy is 78%, and female literacy is 65%. In Singampunari, 11% of the population is under 6 years of age.

== See also ==
- Singampunari
