= Jeyankondanilai =

- Village
- Nickname: karumathur
- Location in Tamil Nadu
- Coordinates: 10°03′17″N 78°26′39″E
- Country: India
- State: Tamil Nadu
- District: Sivaganga
- Former name: Mailrayankottai Nadu
- Native Language: Tamil

Government
  - Type: Panchayat

Population
  - Total: 2,059
- Time zone: UTC+05:30 (IST)
- Pincode(s): 630566
- Area code: +91-4577
- Vehicle registration: TN-63
- Official language: Tamil
- Spoken languages: Tamil, English, Hindi

Jeyankondanilai is a head village in Singampunari taluk, Sivaganga district in the Indian state of Tamil Nadu.

This village is predominantly Kallar village with a minor section of SC community and a couple of families of other castes. This village is a close knit community with almost all families inter related to each other in one way or other. Outside influence has been minimal.

As of the 2011 census, it had a total population of 2,059; 1,082 males and 977 females, of which 269 were children aged 0–6. The literacy rate was 81.01%; 89.14% for males and 72.03% for females.
