= Thirukoshtiyur =

Village in Tamil Nadu

Thirukoshtiyur is a village located near Tirupathur (on Tirupathur-Sivaganga road) on the way to Sivaganga, Tamil Nadu. It is 9 km from Thirupathur.

This place has an importance among Vaishnavas on account of the Sowmya Narayana Perumal temple, which is one of the 108 Divya Desams, the holy shrines of Sri Vaishnavism that were glorified by the hymns of the poet-saints called the Alvars.

== Legend ==
According to the village's regional legend, during the Satya Yuga, the rishis, devas, and humans were tortured by the asura Hiranyakashipu as vengeance for his brother Hiranyaksha's death at the hands of Vishnu, in the form of his boar-avatar, Varaha. The devas and rishis then approached Brahma and Shiva for a solution. In response, Brahma, Shiva, all the devas, and the sapta rishis decided to meet at a place to discuss the issue. Finally, they chose Thirukotiyur as the place for this meeting. They came together as a group, for which the village was named (Tiru - sacred, kōṣṭi - group, ūr - town).

Periyalvar, in his work Periyalvar Tirumoli, visualises Thirukoshtiyur as the birthplace of Krishna.

== Sri Sowmya Narayana Perumal Temple ==
Sri Sowmya Narayana Perumal Thirukovil, surrounded by high walls on its four sides, with a rajagopuram (Main tower) at the entrance is spectacular to behold. The inner infrastructure, mainly sannidhis (separate shrines) are unlike other temples. Inside the temple complex, the shrine for Narayana is constructed in three stages, similar to that of three floors in a building. These stages represent Bhulokam (earth), Tirupparkatal, and Vaikuntham. Narayana is represented in three stages in three forms. On the ground floor, Narayana appears as Krishna in a dancing posture. In the next level, he is seen in the shayana tirukolam posture, where he reclines upon his serpent-mount, Adhishesha. And at the top most level, Narayana is seen standing as Sri Sowmya Narayana Perumal. These forms of Narayana has been poetically described as Nindran (means Standing posture), Kidanthan (means sleeping posture), Adinan (means dancing posture) by Alwars.

According to Sri Vaishnava tradition, Ramanuja was advised by Thirukachi Nambigal to visit Thirukoshtiyur and learn the Ashtakshara mantra from Thirukoshtiyur Nambigal. He was taught the mantra after being rejected seventeen times because of his egocentric use of the word "I" while introducing himself. Despite receiving an explicit command not to reveal his knowledge of the mantra to anyone else on threat of going to hell, Ramanuja climbed to the top of temple, summoned the whole village, and recited the mantra. When Thirukoshtiyur Nambigal demanded to know why Ramanuja had defied him, Ramanuja said that if knowledge of the mantra helped people to attain moksha, he was only too glad to go to hell. Nambigal was overwhelmed by this kindness showed by Ramanuja and he bestowed the epithet "Emperumanar" on Ramanuja. This event happened in front of the Sri Lakshmi Narasimhaswami sannidhi, small shrine present on the way towards the Sowmya Narayana Perumal sannidhi.

== See also ==
- Ramanuja
- Divya Desams

== Gallery ==
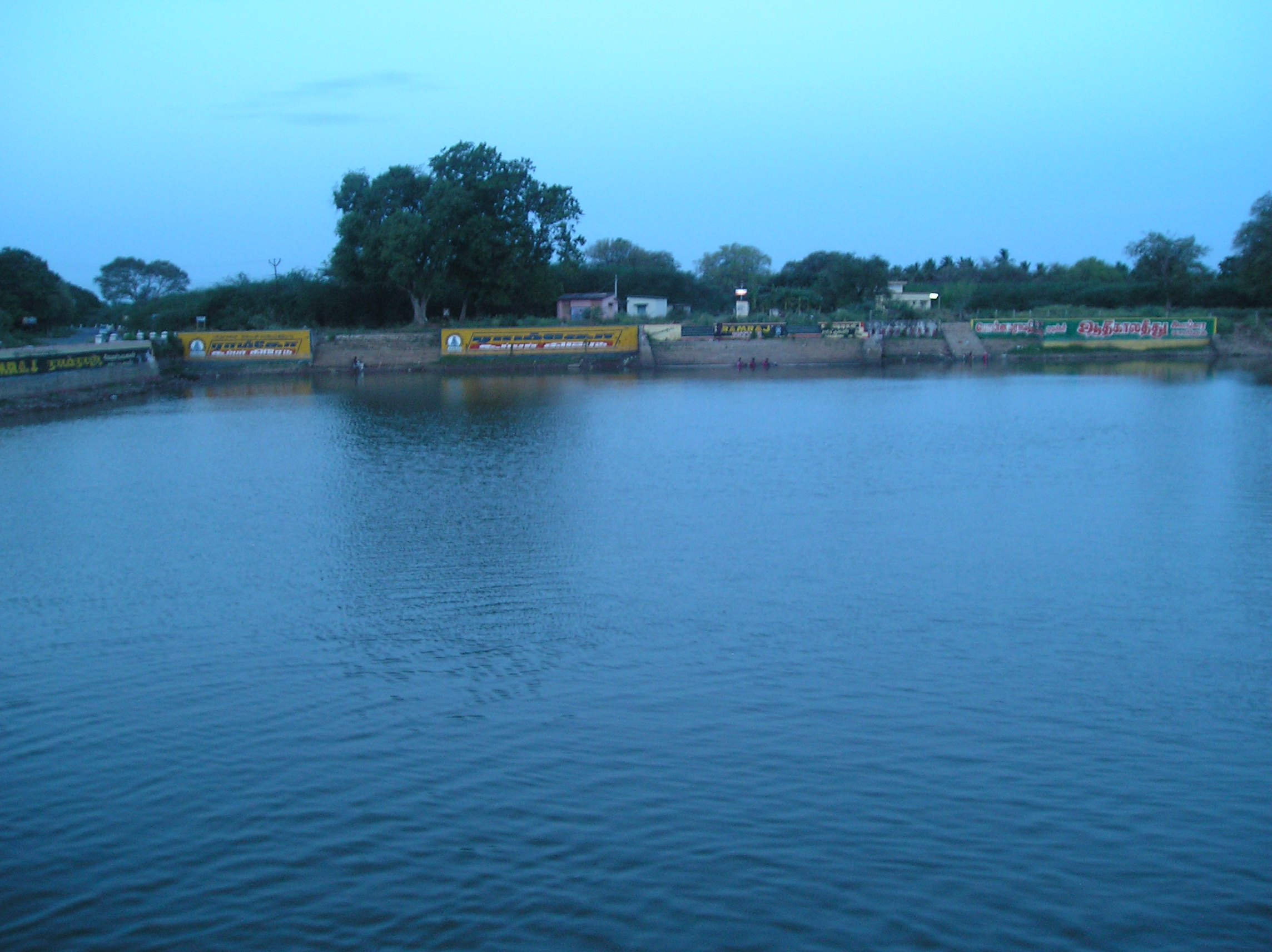
The Temple tank

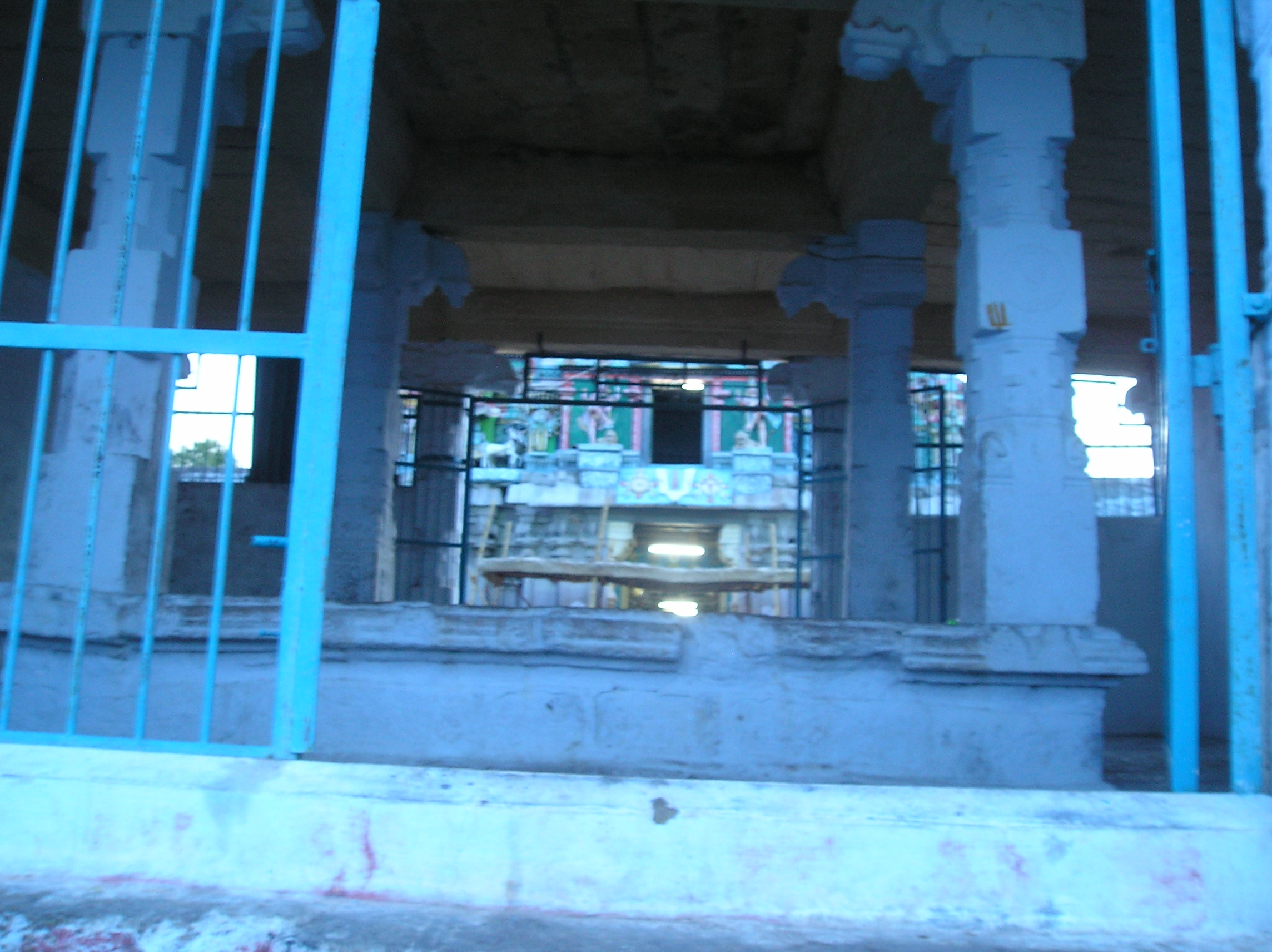
Temple tower
