= Melur =

Melur Mela Nadu or Naduvi Nadu
- Town
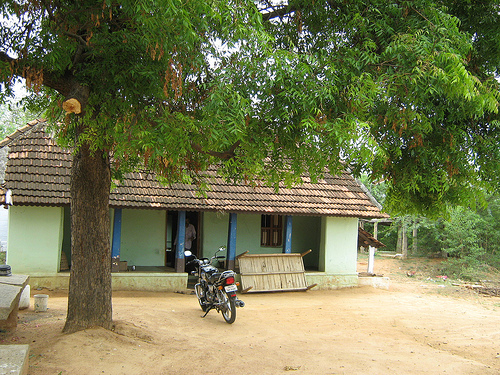
- Traditional village house in Melur

- Location in Tamil Nadu, India
- Coordinates: 10.05°N 78.33°E
- Country: India
- State: Tamil Nadu
- District: Madurai

Government
  - Type: Second Grade Municipality
  - Body: Melur Municipality
  - Panchayat: MELUR

Area
  - Total: 1.9 km^{2} (0.73 sq mi)
- Elevation: 149 m (489 ft)

Population (2011)
  - Total: 40,017
  - Density: 21,000/km^{2} (55,000/sq mi)

Tamil
  - Official: Tamil
- Time zone: UTC+5:30 (IST)
- Vehicle registration: TN-59

Melur is a town in Madurai district in the Indian state of Tamil Nadu. As of 2011, the town had a population of 40,017.

It has an average elevation of 149 metres (489 ft).

== Demographics ==
Religious census
Religion	Percent(%)
Hinduism	78.00%
Islam	17.00%
Christianity	5.00%
Sikhism	0.00%
Other	0.00%

According to the 2011 census, Melur had a population of 40,017 with a sex-ratio of 961 females for every 1,000 males, much above the national average of 929. A total of 4,488 were under the age of six, constituting 2,353 males and 2,135 females. Scheduled Castes and Scheduled Tribes accounted for 12.33% and 0.39% of the population respectively. The average literacy of the town was 79.47%, compared to the national average of 72.99%. The town had a total of 9872 households. There were a total of 14,126 workers, comprising 355 cultivators, 1,493 main agricultural labourers, 295 in household industries, 10,470 other workers, 1,513 marginal workers, 33 marginal cultivators, 230 marginal agricultural labourers, 88 marginal workers in household industries and 1,162 other marginal workers.

As per the religious census of 2011, Melur had 78% Hindus, 17% Muslims, 5% Christians, 0.0% Sikhs and 0.0% following other religions.

== Politics ==
Melur (state assembly constituency) is part of Madurai (Lok Sabha constituency). S. Venkatesan also known as Su. Venkatesan from CPI(M) is the Member of Parliament, Lok Sabha, after his election in the 2019 Indian general election.

== Notable people ==
- P. Kakkan, Indian politician born in Melur Taluk, Madurai district of Madras Presidency.
