= Ramanathapuram Mundu chilli =

Chilli variety grown in Tamil Nadu, India

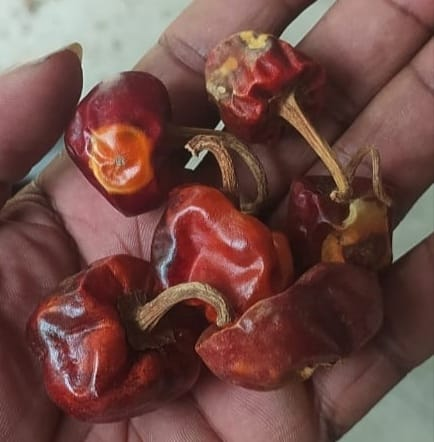
- Species: Capsicum annuum
- Origin: Tamil Nadu, India
- Scoville scale: 17,500 SHU

The Ramanathapuram Mundu chilli is a variety of dry red chilli mainly grown in Ramanathapuram district, of the Indian state of Tamil Nadu. It is primarily grown in the Ramanathapuram district's Tiruvadanai, Mudukulathur, Kadaladi, RS Mangalam and Kamuthi taluks.

== Name ==
It is named after its place of origin, the district of Ramnathapuram and has been cultivated in the district for over 200 years while the word Mundu in Tamil language translates to ‘fat and round’.

=== Local name ===
It is also popularly known as Ramnad Mundu Chilli as during the British period till 1947 this district was known by the name "The Kingdom of Ramnad or Ramnad estate".

== Description ==
Ramnad mundu chillies are round and approximately the size of cherries and they tend to be milder and more flavorful. They are used as in South Indian cuisine like sambar, chutneys and curries. It is seeded directly and cultivated as a rain-fed crop. The chilli has a thick skin and is tolerant of salinity and drought.

== Geographical indication ==
It was awarded the Geographical Indication (GI) status tag from the Geographical Indications Registry under the Union Government of India on 22 February 2022 (valid until 15 November 2030).

Ramnad Mundu Chilli Producer Company Limited from Mudhukulathur, proposed the GI registration of Ramnathapuram Mundu chilli. After filing the application in November 2020, the chilli was granted the GI tag in 2023 by the Geographical Indication Registry in Chennai, making the name "Ramnathapuram Mundu chilli" exclusive to the chilies grown in the region. It thus became the first chilli variety from Tamil Nadu and the 45th type of goods from Tamil Nadu to earn the GI tag.

== See also ==
- Edayur chilli
- Bhiwapur chilli
- Khola chilli
- Harmal chilli
