= Appanur =

- Revenue Village
- Location in Tamil Nadu, India
- Coordinates: 9°N 78°E
- Country: India
- State: Tamil Nadu
- District: Ramanathapuram District
- Talukas: Kadaladi
- Elevation: 19 m (62 ft)

Population (2001)
  - Total: 2,328

Languages
  - Official: Tamil
- Time zone: UTC+5:30 (IST)
- PIN: 623703
- Telephone code: 04576
- Nearest city: Ramanathapuram
- Literacy: 52.02%
- Distance from Ramanathapuram: 55 kilometres (34 mi)
- Distance from Paramakudi: 36 kilometres (22 mi)
- Distance from Mudukulathur: 11 kilometres (6.8 mi)

Appanur is a village in the Kadaladi Taluk of Ramanathapuram District in Tamil Nadu, India. It is located between Mudukulathur and Sayalgudi, on the State Highway 29 (SH29).

== Location ==
Appanur is a small village. It is located on SH29, which runs from Thanjavur to Sayalgudi. The SH29 then runs to join the East Coast Road (Thiruvanmiyur - Mahabalipuram - Marakkanam - Pondicherry Road). Appanur is about 11 km from Mudukulathur, 36 km from Paramakudi and 55 km from Ramanathapuram.

== History ==
It is said that Appanur has been known since ancient times as Thiru Appanur, though Thiru Appanur now refers to a place near Madurai. Appanur, as a part of the Ramnad district was under the Sethupathis during the beginning of the 17th century, then under the British Raj, before it came under the Union of India in 1947 when India received its independence.

It is still an under developed area in India, along with the rest of the Ramnad district. Appanur is known for rainfed bittergourd cultivation.

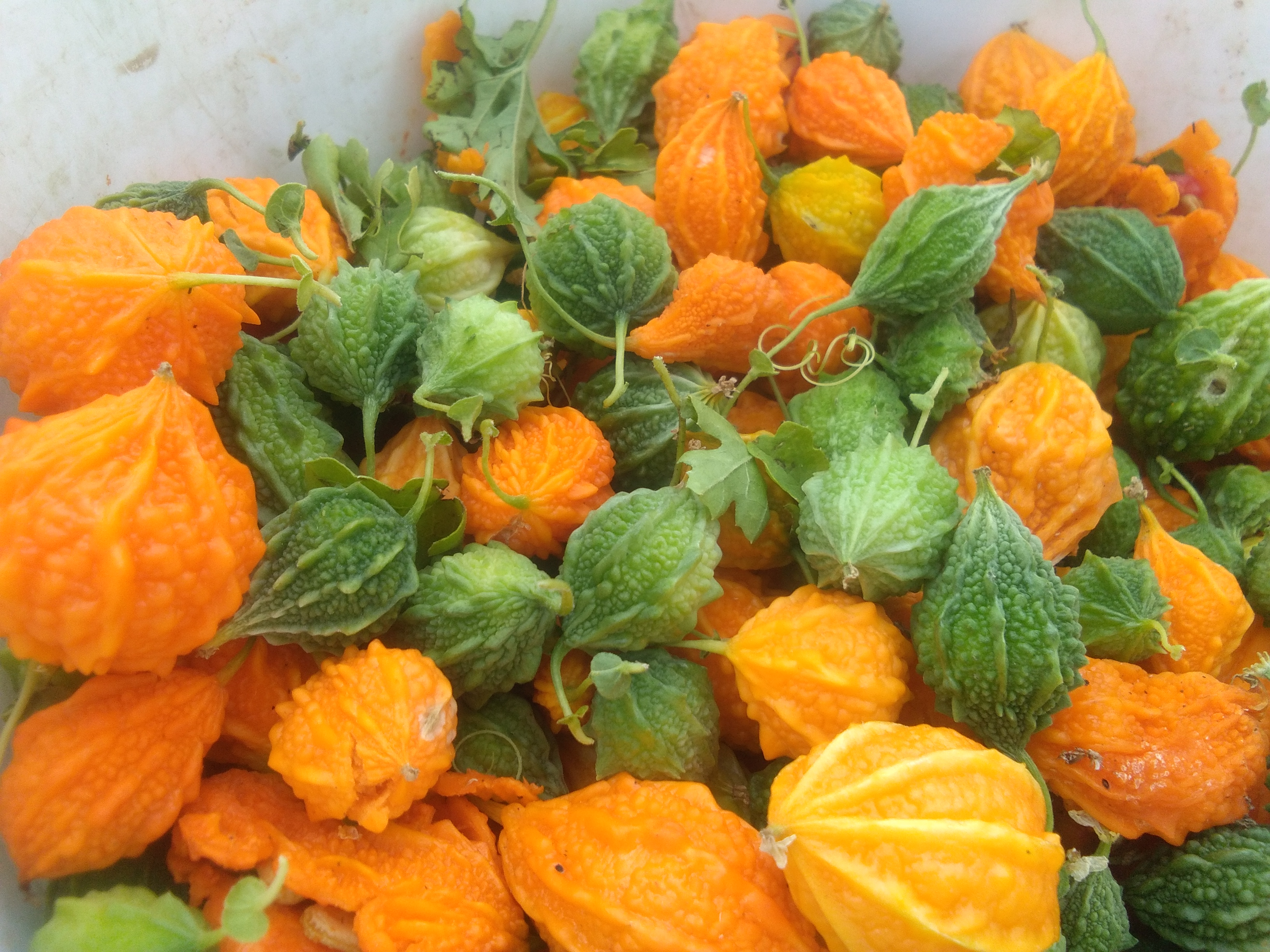
Smaller variety of bitter gourd grown at Appanur.

== Demography ==
Total population of the village is 2328, of whom males are 1178 and females are 1150. Overall literacy rate is 52.02%, male literacy rate is 64.69% and female literacy rate is 39.04%, according to the 2001 census.

== Infrastructure ==
There are three schools in Appanur.

1. Government Primary School
2. Panchayat Union Middle School
3. Sri Ramakrishna Saradhadevi Middle School
4. Government High school

There is a Primary Health Centre, which comes under Paramakudi health district.

There is also a branch post office.

== Cultural Festivals ==
A local festival called 'Maasa' or 'Marsa' is celebrated every year. Other Tamil festivals like Pongal and Deepavali are also celebrated. Bullock-cart races, called Rekla races, are popular locally, and are organised during festival celebrations.
