= Muthuvijayapuram =

Muthuvijayapuram MVP
- Village
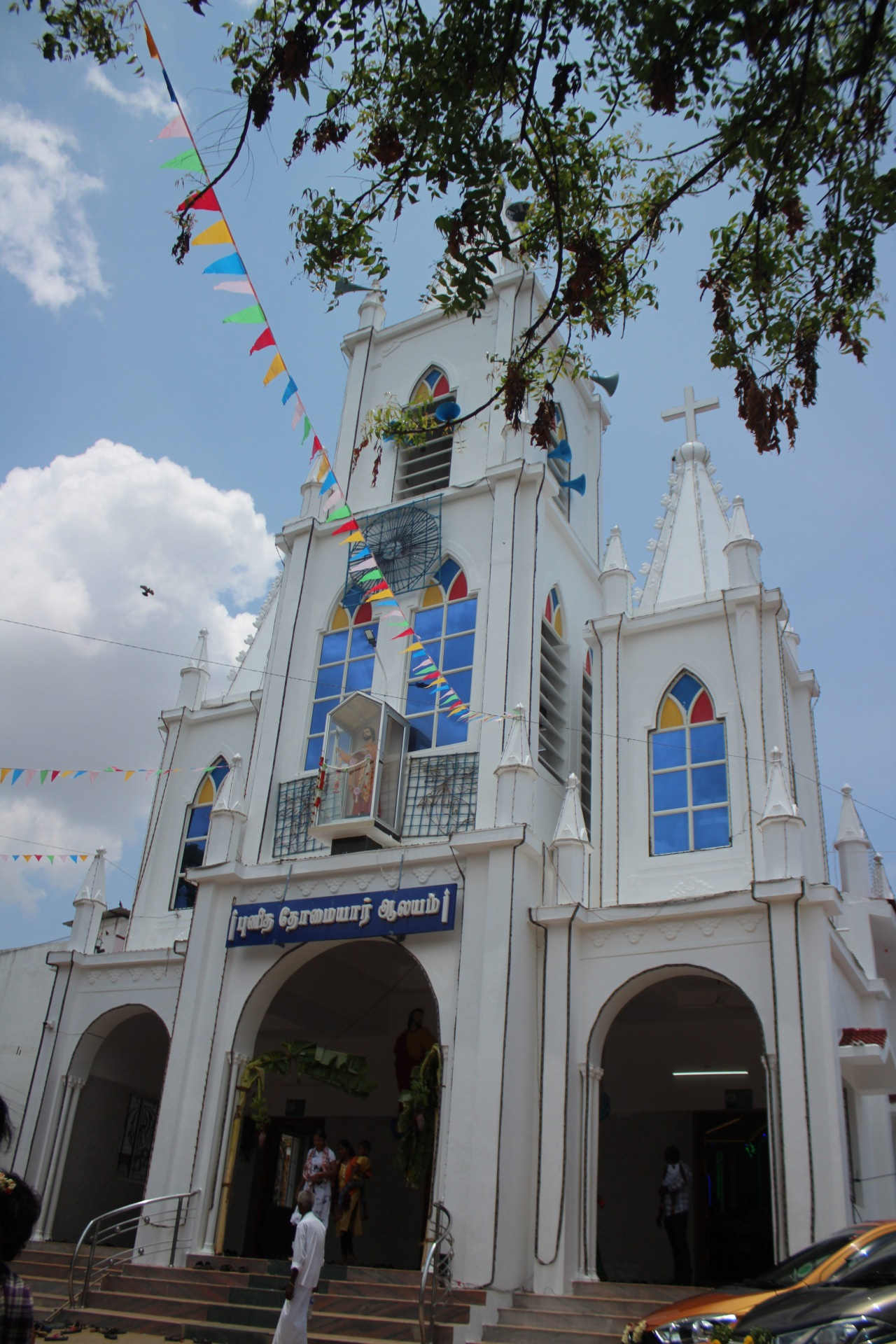
- St Thomas Church

- Location in Tamil Nadu, India
- Coordinates: 9°23′42″N 78°37′38″E
- Country: India
- State: Tamil Nadu
- District: Ramanathapuram
- Elevation: 52.19 m (171.2 ft)

Population
  - Total: around 5,000

Languages
  - Official: Tamil
- Time zone: UTC+5:30 (IST)
- Vehicle registration: TN-65
- Website: muthuvijayapuram.blogspot.com

Muthuvijayapuram is a small village/hamlet located in Mudukulathur Block Ramanathapuram district of Tamil Nadu state in India. It comes under Pirabakaloor Panchayat. It's located 25 km towards west from District headquarters Ramanathapuram.525 km from State capital chennai

== Agriculture ==
People in this village are mostly farmers, Teachers, Indian Army service, Nurse & Medical Dept & Business. They grow Rice, vegetables, Cotton & Chili pepper

== Geography ==
Tamil is the local language here and it's located with the coordinates of (9.3956°N 78.6263°E). It has an average elevation of 52.19 m (171.2 ft). Muthuvijayapuram is 80 km (50 mi) from Madurai and 30 km (19 mi) from Ramanathapuram.

== Transport ==
Muthuvijayapuram is well connected by bus from Paramakudi and Mudukulathur. Nearest Railway station is 18 km to paramakudi

== Festivals ==
The St. Thomas Church Festival is celebrated every year in April, seven days after Easter. As well as Christmas and Easter too.

== School and library ==
There is an elementary English school in village (RC School), and a Sacred Heart Higher Secondary School in Thiruvarangam 3 km from the village. There is also a public library in village.

== St Thomas Church ==
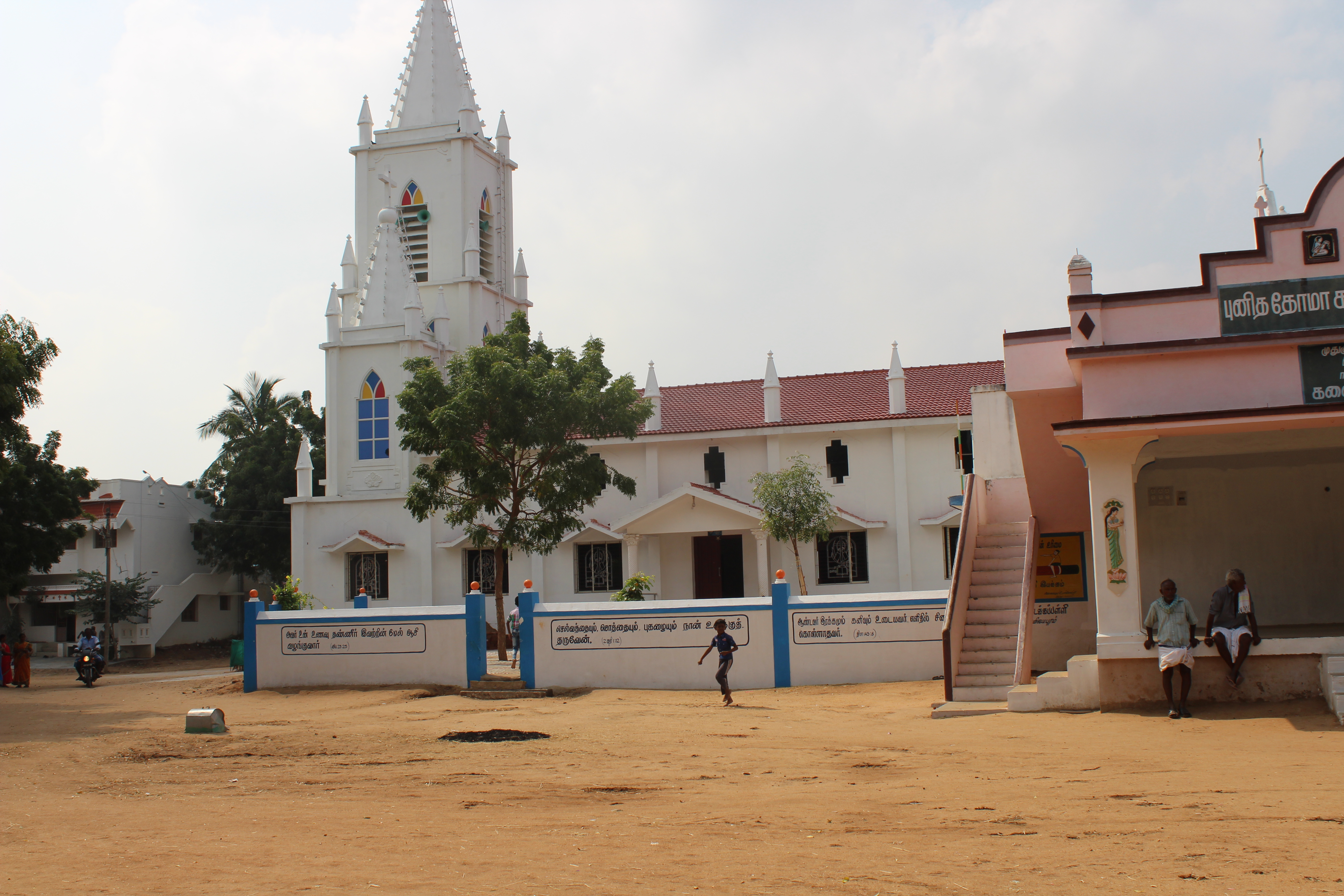

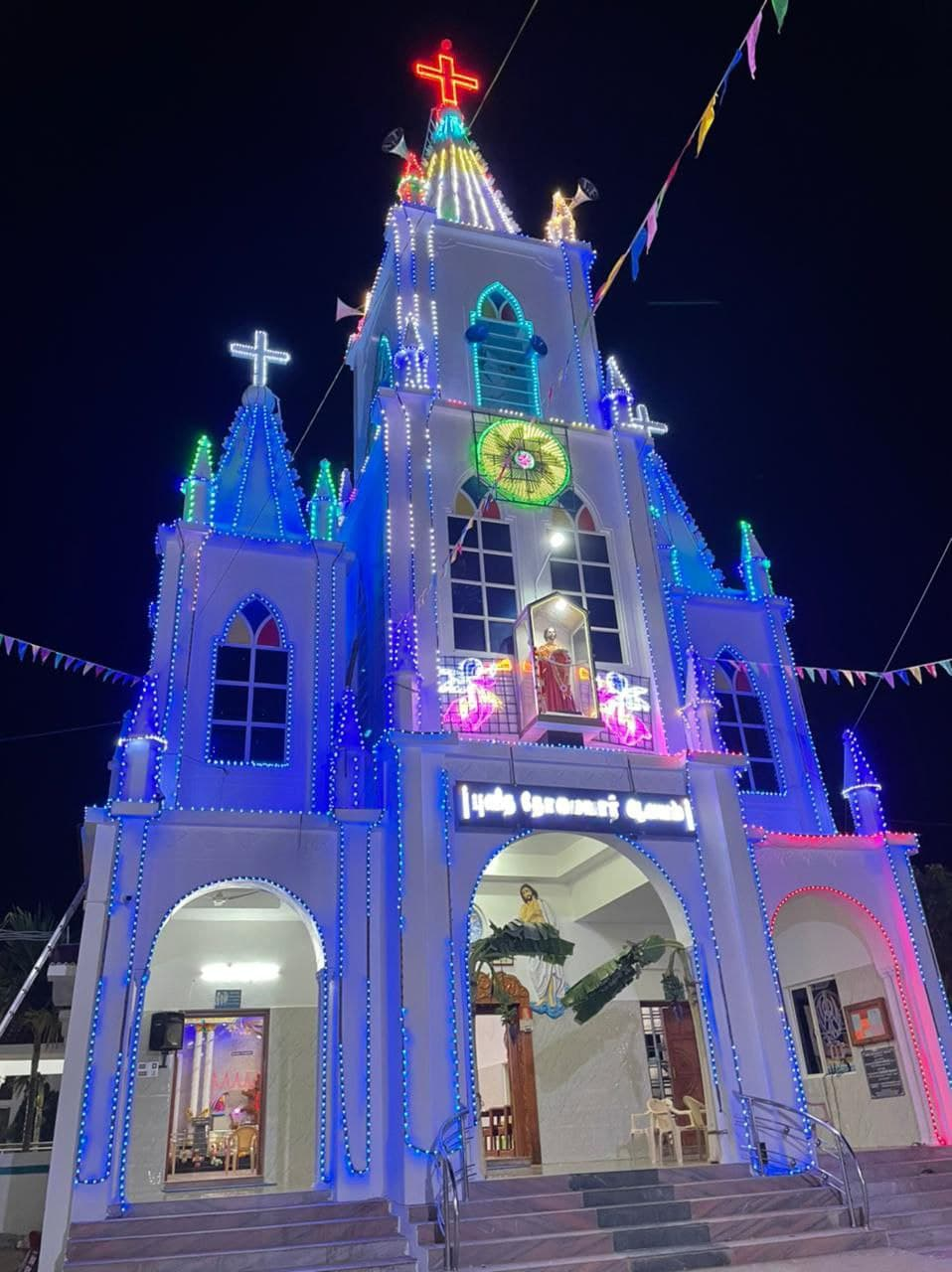
