= Chitrangudi Bird Sanctuary =

Protected area in Tamil Nadu, India

Coordinates: 9°19′22″N 78°29′12″E

- IUCN category IV (habitat/species management area)
- Location within Tamil Nadu Location within India
- Interactive map of Chitrangudi Bird Sanctuary
- Location: Ramanathapuram, Tamil Nadu, India
- Area: 0.48 km^{2} (0.19 sq mi)
- Established: 1989

Ramsar Wetland
- Official name: Chitrangudi Bird Sanctuary
- Designated: 8 November 2021
- Reference no.: 2491

Chitrangudi Bird Sanctuary locally known as "Chitrangudi Kanmoli" is a .4763 km^{2} (0.1839 sq mi) Protected area declared in 1989 and a part of Chitrangudi village, Mudukulathur Taluk, Ramanathapuram District, Tamil Nadu, India. It is adjacent to Kanjirankulam Bird Sanctuary. It is notable as a nesting site for several migratory heron species that roost in the prominent growth of Babul trees there. International name: Chitragudi and Kanjirankulam Bird Sanctuary, IBA Code: IN261, Criteria: A1, A4i. The sanctuary has been designated as a protected Ramsar site since 2021.

== Geography ==
The sanctuary area is within the 15 m (49 ft) high embankments of the community irrigation tank. The total length of the embankment is 4.010 km (2.492 mi). The crescent-shaped Kanmoi starts at a northern point where an aqueduct from the Gundar River flows into the Kanmoi. There are five sluices that drain water to the agricultural lands. The wetland is irregular in depth and retains water for 3 to 5 months if rain is normal. Excess flood water is let out towards Chitrangudi village through a sluice gate about .5 km (0.31 mi) from the inlet aqueduct.

== Flora ==
The sanctuary vegetation is mostly tropical dry deciduous forest. It is dominated by babul (thorn mimosa) along with Prosopis juliflora and the grasses Bermuda grass and Dichanthium foveolatum (Eremopogon foveolatus). A babul plantation was planted in 1979 by Farm Forestry Division. The invasive Prosopis is slowly encroaching on much of the sanctuary area, retarding growth of babuls. The irrigation tank bund and the area outside the tank have tamarind trees, fig trees, neem trees, portia trees, silk trees (Albizzia amara), drumstick trees (Tamil: முருங்கை, murungai), and palmyra palms. The medicinal plants Ocimum sanctum and Gloriosa superba also grow in the area.

== Fauna ==
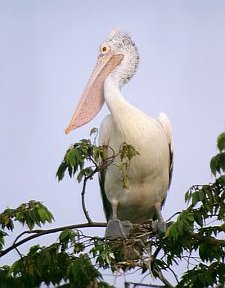
Near threatened spot-billed pelican

The breeding population of migratory waterbirds arrive here between October and February and include: spot-billed pelican, Asian openbill stork, grey heron, purple heron, pond heron, little egret and great egret.

== Visitor information ==
The sanctuary is open year-round and can be reached by road from Mudukulathur 4 km and Sayalgudi 12 km, Ramanathapuram 45 km and Madurai 120 km. The nearest railway station is Paramakudi and the nearest airport is Madurai.

Accommodation is available at PWD Rest House at Mudukulathur 10 kilometers (6.2 mi), the Forest Rest House at Sayalgudi and at Paramakudi.
