= Pasumpon Muthuramalinga Thevar =

Indian politician (1908- 1963)

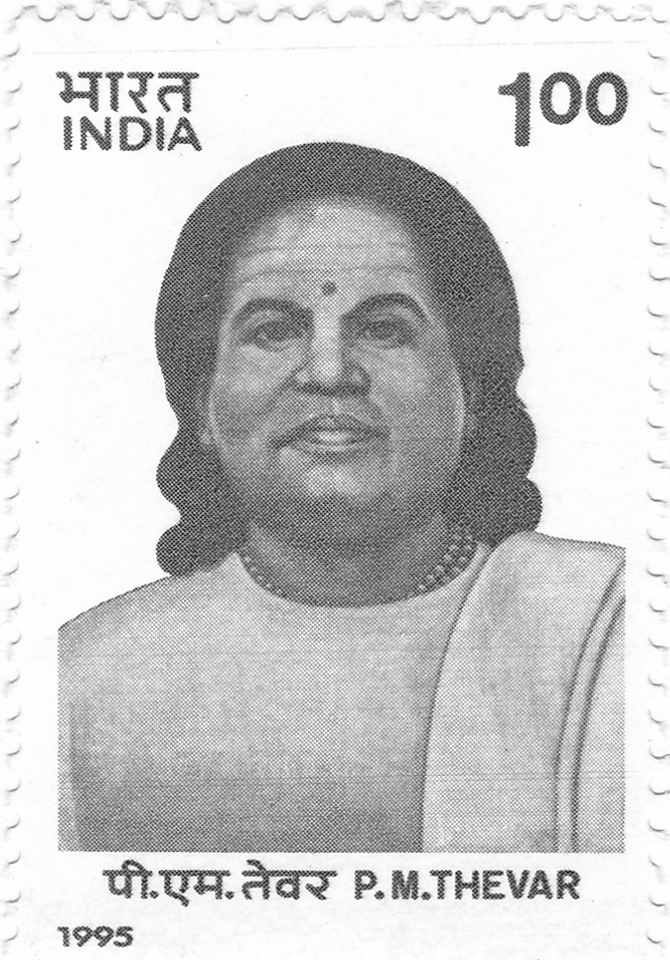
- Portrait of Muthuramalinga Thevar on a postal stamp
- Born: Pasumpon Ukkirapandi Muthuramalinga Thevar; 30 October 1908; Pasumpon village, Ramnad District, Madras Presidency, British India (now in Ramanathapuram District, Tamil Nadu, India)
- Died: 29 October 1963 (aged 54)
- Resting place: Pasumpon, Tamil Nadu
- Other name: Deiva Thirumaganar
- Occupations: Farmer; Freedom Fighter Indian independence activist Politician
- Political party: All India Forward Bloc
- Other political affiliations: Indian National Congress (Till 1939)

Ukkirapandi Muthuramalinga Thevar (30 October 1908 – 29 October 1963), also known as Pasumpon Muthuramalinga Thevar, was a politician and a patriarch of the Thevar community. He was elected three times to the national Parliamentary Constituency.

== Childhood and family life ==
Muthuramalinga Thevar was born on 30 October 1908 in Pasumpon, Ramnad District. From 1910, he was in the custody of his maternal grandmother Parvathiammal in the neighbouring village of Kallupatti. Parvathiammal was furious with Muthuramalinga Thevar's father for having taken two new wives shortly after the death of his second wife.

During his youth, Muthuramalinga Thevar was aided by Kuzhanthaisami Pillai, a close family friend of his father. Pillai took responsibility of arranging Muthuramalinga Thevar's schooling. First he was given a private tuition and in June 1917 he began attending classes at an elementary school run by the American missionaries in Kamuthi. Later he joined the Pasumalai High School (near Thirupparankundaram) and then he shifted to the Union Christian High School in Madurai.

Muthuramalinga Thevar did not complete his studies. The following year he also missed his chance to attend the final examinations, as he had returned to Pasumpon to fight a legal battle over issues of inheritance on family property. The case lingered and was not settled until 1927, when the court ruled in favour of Muthuramalinga Thevar.

Muthuramalinga Thevar's father died on 6 June 1939.

== Opposition to Criminal Tribes Act ==
One issue particularly impacted on Thevar's political career. The Criminal Tribes Act (CTA) had been enacted in 1920 by the government of the Madras Presidency and was subsequently implemented in a piecemeal fashion. Thevar mobilised resistance to it, touring villages in the affected areas and leading protest rallies for the rights of the individuals registered under it. In 1929, the Maravars of 19 villages in Appanad were forced to register, under the CTA. Thevar led a massive campaign in the villages, urging the people to defy it. The authorities partially withdrew, and reduced the number of CTA registrations in the concerned areas from around 2000 to 341.

In 1934, Thevar organised a convention at Abhiramam, which urged the authorities to repeal the CTA. A committee consisting of Thevar, P. Varadarajulu Naidu, Perumal Thevar, Sasivarna Thevar and Navaneethakrishna Thevar was appointed by the convention to carry on the efforts to persuade the government to revoke the Act.

The CTA was, however, not revoked but instead its implementation was widened. Thevar again led agitations and awareness-raising campaigns against the Act. At the time the Justice Party was governing the Madras Presidency, and their refusal to revoke the law created a strong animosity on Thevar's behalf towards that party.

== 1936 District Board election ==
Infuriated by the attitude of the Justice Party government towards the CTA, Thevar concluded that the communities affected by the Act had to be mobilised by the Congress. After returning from a trip to Burma in 1936, he began to work to strengthen the Congress in the southern areas of the Presidency. He contested the election to the Ramnad District Board from the Mudukulathur constituency, defeating his Justice Party opponent. This was Thevar's first experience of being a candidate in an election.

After the election, Thevar made a bid to be elected the president of the District Board, as did P. S. Kumarasamy, the Raja of Rajapalyam. Conflict erupted within the local Congress organisation over the issue. S. Satyamurthi, on behalf of the Tamil Nadu Congress Committee, intervened to preserve the unity of the Congress. Thevar was persuaded to withdraw his candidature and presented a motion nominating Kumarasamy as president.

When the Congress Socialist Party began to mobilise in the Madras Presidency in 1936, Thevar joined their ranks.

== 1937 provincial election ==
Ahead of the 1937 elections to the assembly of the Madras Presidency, Thevar enlisted youths from the Mukkulathor communities to work for the Congress. His activities created worries for the Justice Party government, which forbade him to travel outside of the Ramnad district and to make speeches in public.

In February 1937, Thevar contested the assembly election himself, as a Congress candidate in the Ramanathapuram constituency. He had a powerful opponent, the Raja of Ramnad. Thevar won a landslide victory with 11,942 votes against 6,057 for the Raja.

Following the election, the Congress formed a government in the Presidency. Thevar had high hopes that the new Congress ministry would revoke the Criminal Tribes Act but the new Chief minister, C. Rajagopalachari, did not do so.

== Trade unionist ==
During the late 1930s, Thevar became increasingly involved in labour activities. He formed and led the Pasumalai Mahalaskshmi Mill Workers' Union, the Meenakshi Mill Workers' Union and the Madura Knitting Company Labour Union. During a prolonged strike of the Pasumalai Mahalaskshmi Mill Workers' Union, demanding the reinstatement of a section of fired trade unionists, Thevar was jailed for seven months from 15 October 1938. In the end, the management of the Mahalakshmi Mills accepted the demands of the union. In the same period, a strike was led by Thevar at the Madura Knitting Company.

In 1945, he became the founding president of the TVS Thozhilali Sangam.

== Formation of the Forward Bloc ==
Thevar attended the 52nd annual session of the Indian National Congress, held in Tripuri in March 1939. At this meeting the presidency of Subhas Chandra Bose was challenged by Pattabhi Sitaramayya. Sitaramayya had the active support of Gandhi. Bose, whom Thevar supported, was re-elected as the Congress President.

Bose was elected president again over Gandhi's preferred candidate Pattabhi Sitaramayya. Thevar strongly supported Bose in the intra-Congress dispute. He mobilised all south India votes for Bose. However, due to the manoeuvrings of the Gandhi-led clique which included doyens like Sardar Vallabhai Patel, Dr Rajendra Prasad etc in the Congress Working Committee, Bose found himself forced to resign from the Congress Presidency. He then launched the Forward Bloc on 22 June, calling for the unification of all left-wing elements into a united organisation within the Congress. Thevar, who was disillusioned by the official Congress leadership which had not revoked the CTA, joined the Forward Bloc. When Bose visited the state immediately after the formation of the Forward Bloc in 1939, it was Thevar who played the key role in arranging a rousing reception in Madurai on 6 September.

== Support for the Temple Entry Movement ==
The Temple Entry Authorisation and Indemnity Act was passed by the government of C. Rajagopalachari in 1939. This removed restrictions prohibiting Dalits from entering Hindu temples. Thevar supported this reform and on 8 July 1939 he helped the activist A. Vaidyanatha Iyer take Dalits to Meenakshi Temple in Madurai. U. Muthuramalingam Thevar strongly supported this reform, and issued a warning statement. He said, "I would be there at the entrance of the Meenakshi Temple. Those who dare to prevent the Dalits’ entry into the temple, could come there and meet me. I will answer them." After this statement, the caste Hindus hesitated to prevent. On 8 July 1939, Vaidyanatha Iyer entered the Meenakshi temple at Madurai with the company of L. N. Gopalasamy and six of his Dalit friends, P. Kakkan, Muruganandam, Chinniah, Purnalingam and Muthu.

== In jail ==
The growing popularity in Thevar as a leader of elements opposing the official Congress leadership in Tamil Nadu troubled the Congress-led government. Thevar was also increasingly associated with labour militancy. A criminal case, the so-called Madura Security Case, was proceeded against him. He was banned from leaving Madurai. When travelling to his birthplace, Pasumpon, in September 1940 he was apprehended and jailed for 18 months at the Central Jail in Tiruchirapalli. His capture sparked wide condemnation in Tamil Nadu.

Soon after his release, he was arrested again, under the Defense of India Rules. He was released from prison on 5 September 1945.

== After release from jail ==
In 1945, Rajagopalachari tried to make a comeback within the Congress organisation in Tamil Nadu. He had the support of Gandhi and Sardar Patel, but the majority of the Tamil Nadu Congress Committee opposed him. A conference was held in Tirupparankundram to elect the leadership. Chaos broke out as warring factions confronted each other. Thevar interrupted the disputes and passed a motion re-electing Kamaraj as the TNCC President.

Elections to the assembly of the Madras Presidency were again held in March 1946. Thevar contested from the Mudukulathur constituency, and was elected unopposed. Soon thereafter, the CTA was repealed.

In February 1948, the Congress expelled all dissenting fractions, including the Forward Bloc, which became an independent opposition party. Thevar became its president of its Tamil Nadu state unit, a position he would hold for the rest of his life.

On 23 January 1949, in connection with birthday anniversary celebrations of Bose, Thevar announced that Bose was alive and that he had met him. Soon thereafter Thevar disappeared without any explanation. He returned to public life in October 1950. Rumours claimed that he had travelled to Korea and China during this period.

On the national level, the Forward Bloc had been suffering from internal ideological divisions. In 1948, two separate Forward Blocs had emerged, a 'Forward Bloc (Marxist)' (out of which the Forward Bloc of today emerged) and a 'Forward Bloc (Ruiker)' (led by R.S. Ruiker). On 23 June 1951, the two parties reunified at a meeting in Calcutta. A central committee was announced for the united party, which included Thevar as one of its members.

== 1952 general election ==
In January 1952, the first general elections in independent India were held. The Forward Bloc contested with the aim of forming non-Congress governments at the Centre as well as in the states. Election were held simultaneously to the Lok Sabha as well as to the legislative assemblies of the states. Thevar contested the Aruppukottai Lok Sabha constituency, Ramanathapuram Lok Sabha constituency in the Lok Sabha election and the Mudukulathur constituency in the assembly election. He lost in Ramanathapuram Lok Sabha constituency. After the election, he decided to vacate his Lok Sabha seat and concentrate his efforts to the Madras legislative assembly.

After the election, Congress lacked a majority of its own in the Madras legislative assembly. Thevar cooperated with the communists in trying to form a non-Congress governing coalition. However, the governor intervened and made C. Rajagopalachari of the Congress, the Chief Minister.

== Split in the Forward Bloc ==
In 1955, internal divisions reappeared with the Forward Bloc. The Indian National Congress had adopted Socialism as its guiding principle at a session in Madras. Some leaders within the Forward Bloc, like the chairman Mohan Singh and Sheel Bhadra Yajee, now argued that the time had come for the Forward Bloc to merge with the Congress. This proposal did however not win much support in other sections of the party leadership. Singh-Yagee unilaterally declared the party merged into the Congress.

An extraordinary central committee meeting was convened in Nagpur 11–15 May 1955. Singh, Yagee and their followers were expelled from the party. Hemanth Kumar Bose was elected chairman of the party, Haldulkar the general secretary and Thevar the deputy chairman of the party. Thevar would hold that post until his death.

== 1957 general election ==
Thevar travelled to Burma for the second time in December 1955, taking part in political and religious activities organised by the All Burma Tamil Nadu Association. He returned on 18 February 1956 and began to prepare for the erstwhile coming general election.

A new dynamic in the efforts to build a non-Congress front had emerged in the Madras State (which had been reorganised in 1956). The Congress had been divided and C. Rajagopalachari had formed a new party, the Congress Reform Committee (CRC).

In the election, Thevar again contested both the Aruppukottai constituency in the Lok Sabha election and the Mudukulathur constituency in the assembly election. He won both seats, but this time he decided to vacate the assembly seat.

== Ramnad riots ==
A by-election was held in the Mudukulathur assembly constituency on 1 July 1957, as Thevar had resigned from his assembly seat. The election was won by D. V. Sasivarna Thevar of the Forward Bloc. The situation in the area was tense on the day that the results were released, and there was a sizeable presence of police forces in place. Clashes between Maravars, Kudumbars who largely supported the Forward Bloc, and pro-Congress supporters Pallars began in a few villages soon after the election result was acknowledged. Gradually the violence spread to more and more villages, and by August the riots had spread throughout the entire district. Several persons were killed and thousands of houses were torched.

== Final years ==
After being released from prison Thevar began mobilising for the Madurai municipal elections, held in March 1959. An alliance of the Forward Bloc, Communist Party of India, Indian National Democratic Congress and Dravida Munnetra Kazhagam was formed. The alliance won the elections, and for the first time Congress lost its hold over the city administration.

Following the election, Thevar's health deteriorated and he largely withdrew from public life. He was nominated for the 1962 Lok Sabha election but attended only one campaign meeting, which also was attended by Rajaji (who now had merged with his INDC with the Swatantra Party). Thevar was re-elected, but for health reasons he was unable to travel to the parliament in Delhi.Thevar died on October 29, 1963, one day before his 55th birthday. He died in Thirunagar, Madurai.

== Legacy ==
After his death, the Forward Bloc entered into a period of decline in Tamil Nadu and Kerala. The party leadership was overtaken by Thevar's disciple P.K. Mookiah Thevar. The party organisation became ridden by splits and disputes. In this situation, the major chunk of the Mukulathor vote-bank of the Forward Bloc was overtaken by the Dravida Munnetra Kazhagam and the All India Anna Dravida Munnetra Kazhagam.

Several official honours have been given to Thevar. In 1968 the Pasumpon Muthuramalinga Thevar College was founded in Usilampatti by the then DMK-led state government. His biography was included in the high school textbooks in Tamil Nadu. In 1971 his cemetery in Pasumpon was converted into an official memorial. A life-size portrait of Thevar was installed in the Tamil Nadu assembly in 1980. In 1984, after the bifurcation of the Ramnad District the 'Pasumpon Muthuramalingam District' was created. On 1 October 2002 the life-size statue of Thevar was unveiled in the Parliament House by the then President of India, A.P.J. Abdul Kalam. This statue was donated by former Union minister Subramanian Swamy. But at the same time his legacy is not entirely uncontroversial. At times violence between Thevars and Dalits flare up in the area, and desecrations of monuments of Muthuramalinga Thevar have taken place.

=== Thevar Outreach ===
On 9 February 2014, The 13-kg gold armour was donated by then Chief Minister of Tamil Nadu Jayalalithaa for adorning the 3.5-feet-tall statue of Pasumpon Muthuramalinga Thevar at Pasumpon in Ramanathapuram district to woo Thevars, an influential OBC community in south Tamil Nadu. ahead of 2014 general election. Thevar Community is seen as the traditional vote bank of the AIADMK party in the southern Tamil Nadu since its inception. The gold armour is estimated to be worth Rs 4 crore. The armour is kept in a nationalised bank locker in madurai. After AIADMK party treasurer and the trustee of the memorial signing in the bank, The Golden Armour would be taken out and handed over to the incharge of the memorial every year between 28 and 30 October observe Thevar Jayanthi.

== Cited sources ==
- Bose, K. (1988). Forward Bloc. Madras: Tamil Nadu Academy of Political Science.
- Chattopadhyay, Subhas Chandra (1989). Subhas Chandra Bose: man, mission, and means. Minerva Associates. ISBN 9788185195193.
- Phadnis, Aditi (2009). Business Standard Political Profiles of Cabals and Kings. Business Standard Books. ISBN 978-81-905735-4-2.
