= S. Balakrishnan (Mudukulathur MLA) =

Indian politician

S. Balakrishnan, also known as So. Balakrishnan or So.Ba, was a veteran Indian politician, President of TNCC (2002–2003) and Opposition Leader of the Legislative Assembly of Tamil Nadu for 18 years. He was the Leader of the Opposition in the 11th Tamil Nadu Legislative Assembly (1996–2001).

Balakrishnan was elected to the Tamil Nadu Legislative Assembly as an Indian National Congress (INC) candidate from Mudukulathur constituency in the 1977 and 1991 elections and as a Tamil Maanila Congress (Moopanar) (TMC) candidate from the same constituency in 1996. He was also elected from Kadaladi as a TMC candidate in the 2001 election. He represented Kadaladi, from 2001 until his death in 2006. In the Tamil Nadu Legislative Assembly, So.Balakrishnan represented Mudukalathur for thirteen years and Kadaladi for five years.

Balakrishnan unsuccessfully contested elections in the same Ramanathapuram district on other occasions. In the General Elections of 1971, he was runner-up in the Ramanathapuram Lok Sabha constituency with 139,276 votes (38.87% of the total). In the state elections of 1980, he contested from Mudukalathur and polled 37,175 votes (44.77%) but lost the election by 5536 votes. In the 1989 state elections, he contested from Kadaladi, a coastal constituency that neighboured Mudukalathur, and gained 32,273 votes, which was 409 (0.38%) less than the winner. The total number of votes that were rejected or declared invalid in that constituency during the election was 1878 (1.71%).

== Last days ==
On 4 September 2004, Balakrishnan suffered serious spinal injuries in a road accident at Paramakudi while returning from Rameswaram after a discussion on Sethusamudram Ship Channel Project with the then Union Shipping Minister. The accident resulted in prolonged illness after a brief improvement. He died on 24 June 2006.

The then Chief Minister of Tamil Nadu, Karunanidhi, in his condolence message recalled the effective speeches made by Balakrishnan in the Assembly and said that Balakrishnan was a role model for young legislators.
