= Nallathanni Theevu =

Indian island

Nalla Thanni Theevu
Native name: நல்ல தண்ணி தீவு
- Interactive map of Nalla Thanni Theevu

Geography
- Coordinates: 9.10667°N 78.57885°E
- Area: 1.01 km^{2} (0.39 sq mi)
- Highest elevation: 11.9 m (39 ft)

Administration
- India
- State: Tamil Nadu
- District: Ramanathapuram
- Taluk: Kadaladi taluk

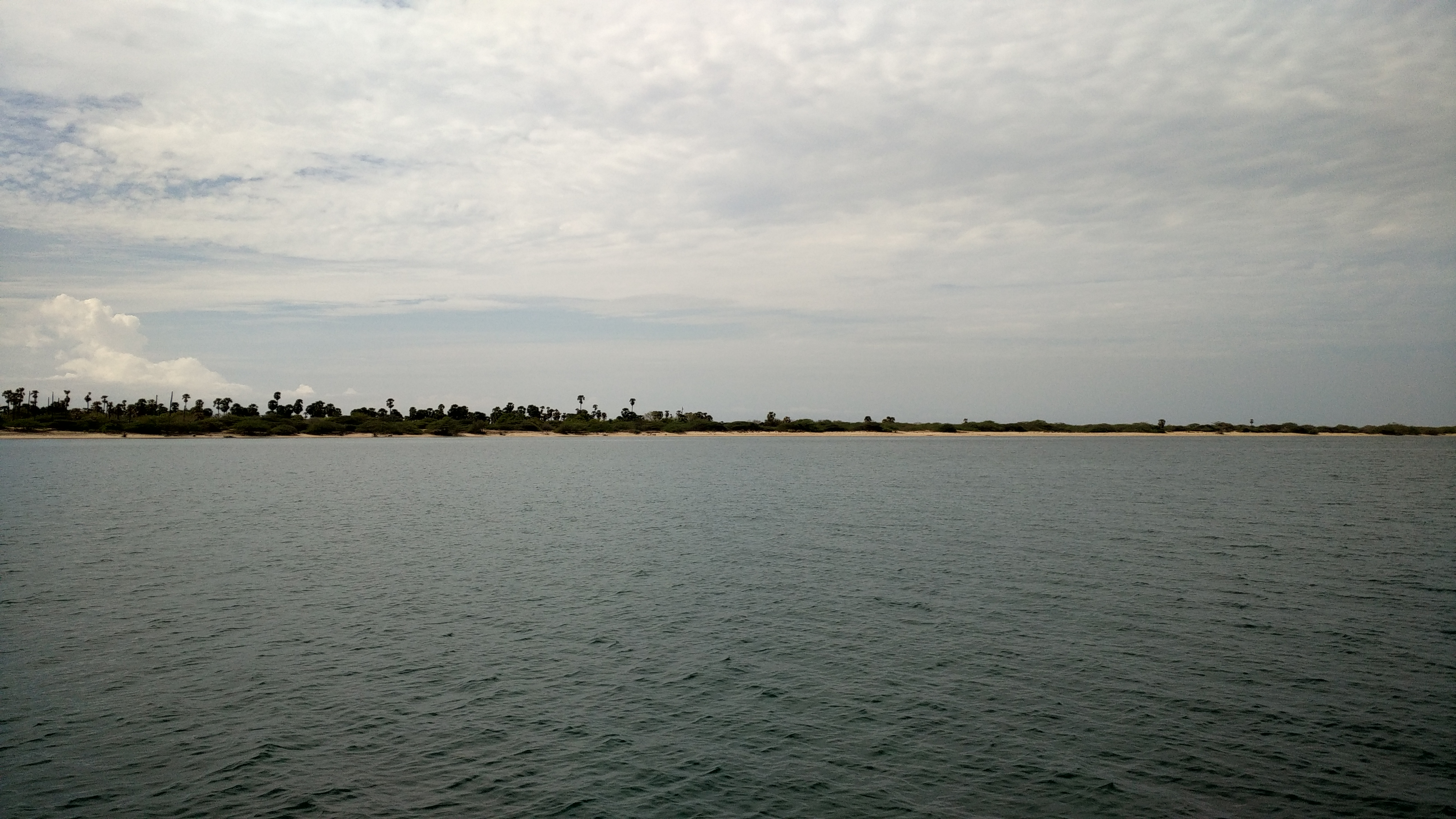

Nalla Thanni Theevu (Tamil: நல்ல தண்ணி தீவு) is an island situated in the Gulf of Mannar about 4 kilometers south-east of the coast of Tamil Nadu, India. It is one of the three uninhabited islands in the Gulf of Mannar the others being Krusadai Island and Muyal Island. It forms a part of the Kadaladi taluk of Ramanathapuram district.
