= Kanjirankulam Bird Sanctuary =

- IUCN category IV (habitat/species management area)
- Location within Tamil Nadu Location within India
- Interactive map of Kanjirankulam Bird Sanctuary
- Location: Ramanathapuram, Tamil Nadu, India
- Area: 1.04 km^{2} (0.40 sq mi)
- Established: 1989

Ramsar Wetland
- Official name: Kanjirankulam Bird Sanctuary
- Designated: 8 April 2022
- Reference no.: 2486

Kanjirankulam Bird Sanctuary is a 1.04 km^{2} (0.40 sq mi) Protected area near Mudukulathur Ramanathapuram District, Tamil Nadu. India, declared in 1989. 9°20′N 78°29′E. It is adjacent to Chitrangudi Bird Sanctuary. It is notable as a nesting site for several migratory heron species that roost in the prominent growth of babul trees there. International name: Chitragudi and Kanjirankulam Bird Sanctuary, IBA Code: IN261, Criteria: A1, A4i. The sanctuary has been designated as a protected Ramsar site since 2022.

== Flora ==
The sanctuary vegetation is mostly tropical dry deciduous forest. It is dominated by babul along with Prosopis juliflora and the grasses Bermuda grass and Eremopogon foveolatus. The invasive Prosopis is slowly encroaching on much of the sanctuary area, retarding growth of babuls. The irrigation tank bund and the area outside the tank have tamarind trees, fig trees, neem trees, portia trees, silk trees (Albizzia amara), drumstick trees (Tamil: murungai, முருங்கை), and palmyra palms.

== Fauna ==
The breeding population of migratory waterbirds arrive here between October and February and include: painted stork, white ibis, black ibis, little egret, great egret.

== Visitor information ==
The sanctuary can be reached by road from Mudukulathur 8 km and Madurai 117 km. The nearest railway is Paramakudi 15 km and the nearest airport is Madurai.

Accommodation is available at PWD Rest House at Mudukalathur 7 km, the Forest Rest House at Sayalgudi – 30 km and Paramakudi.
