= Melasirupothu =

Village in Tamil Nadu, India

Coordinates: 9°16′44″N 78°34′44″E

Melasirupothu is a village in Ramanathapuram district and Mudukulathur Taluka in the Indian state of Tamil Nadu. It is 16 km west of Mudukulathur, 8 km east of Sikkal and 15 km east of Ervadi. It is famous for its Thinnayiramoorthi temple, and one of the most popular festivals is the Kuthirai Eduppu. In this village have Panchayt Union Middle School and Government Primary Health Centre. But, recently they boycotted the 2019 lok shaba election because of their plea for clean drinking water, road facilities and school were not met with and government did not take any initiative.

== More details ==
This village has two religions only Hindus and Muslims. It has Thinnayiramoorthi Temple Vinagayar Temple, NavaNeetha Krishnan Temple, Mariamman Temple, Muniyandi(Pandi) Temple, and Kuthukallu Muni. A majority of Yadava's are here. Pallivasal is placed as the main part of the village. In this Pallivasal manage one hostel like name as Matharasa Manbover Rilwan. This hostel is famous for teaching Arabic alongside conventional school studies. This village has all facilities such as the bus, hospital, and school.
