= Kalayur =

Kalaiyur
- Village
- Location in Tamil Nadu, India
- Coordinates: 9.527621919081884°N 78.63314744953125°E
- Country: India
- State: Tamil Nadu
- District: Ramanathapuram district
- Time zone: UTC+5:30 (IST)
- PIN: 623601,623712
- Telephone code: 914576 XX

Kalaiyur is a village in Ramanathapuram in Tamil Nadu, India. It is located 25 km towards north from Ramanathapuram and 9 km away from Paramakkudi. Kalaiyur is known as the Village of Cooks. The village was featured in History TV18's show OMG! Yeh Mera India - Season 2, hosted by Krishna Abhishek.

== Demographics ==
The Kalaiyur has total 356 families residing in Kalaiyur. It has population of 1406 of which 712 are males and 694 are females as per 2011 Census of India. In 2011, literacy rate of Kalaiyur was 100% compared to 100% of Tamil Nadu. In male literacy stands at 100% and female literacy rate was 100%.

== Sports ==
Kabaddi is the popular sport. The kalaiyur kabaddi team (karumalaiyan 7s kabaddi team, kalaiyur) is one of the best kabaddi team in ramanathapuram district.

== Festival ==
Kalaiyur is a village near Paramakudi in the Ramanathapuram district of Tamil Nadu. The "Karumalaiyan Temple Whip-Lashing Festival" (Saattaiyadi Thiruvizha) and the "Peyattam" (a ritual dance) held here are very famous. Festival Highlights – Fulfillment of Vows: As part of the fulfillment of vows—undertaken to seek relief from evil forces, illnesses, and family problems—women undergo a ritual of being struck with a whip during the festival. Whip-lashing: Devotees accept the lashes of the whip wielded by the *Saamiyars* (ritual performers) as the fulfillment of a vow. They then conclude their worship by bathing in a nearby pond.

- Kazhumaram*: A key event of the festival involves bringing a specific tree—the *Udai* tree, from which the *Saamiyar* delivers prophecies—planting it in front of the temple, and performing special rituals.

Annadhanam: Thousands of devotees arriving from various towns fulfill their vows by slaughtering goats and hosting a feast.
