= Valayapookulam =

Valaya pookulam is a village located near Kamuthi in Tamil Nadu state of India. The village falls under the Ramanathapuram district and the Mudukulathur constituency.

The main occupations of the villagers are agriculture and cattle breeding. Many people from the village have migrated to urban areas, and are living in Chennai, Madurai, Pudukkottai, Thanjavur and Kanchipuram.

The village has a secondary school managed by the Nadars. Periya Muthamman, Pathirakali Amman, Madasamy, Muneeshwarar, Ayyanar and Periyandavar temples are the important temples of the village. Vaikasi Pongal is the main festival of the village. The village has members of the Nadar community.valayapookulam is short of VPK
