= Veeravanoor =

- village
- Location in Tamil Nadu, India Veeravanoor (India)
- Coordinates: 9°24′19″N 78°45′33″E
- Country: India
- State: Tamil Nadu
- District: Ramanathapuram

Population (2001)
  - Total: 1,072

Languages
  - Official: Tamil
- Time zone: UTC+5:30 (IST)
- PIN: 623502
- Telephone code: +91 4564
- Sex ratio: 983 ♂/♀

Veeravanoor is a village in Ramanathapuram District in the Indian state of Tamil Nadu.

== Geography ==
Veeravanoor is located at which is near Sathirakudi, 14 kilometres west of Ramanathapuram, and 27 kilometres southeast of Paramakudi on NH 49.

Veeravanoor covers 4 square miles (8.3 km^{2}), and surrounded on the eastern side by forests, western side by Bogalur, southern side by Seyyalor village and on the northern side is Vairavanenthal village.

== Climate ==
The climate of Veeravanoor is tropical in nature with little variation in summer and winter temperatures. While April to June is the hottest summer period with the temperature rising up to the 40 °C mark, November to February is the coolest winter period with temperature hovering around 20 °C, making the climate quite pleasant. Surprisingly, Veeravanoor gets all its rains from the north-east monsoons between October and December.

== Transport ==
=== Rail ===
The nearest railway station is in Ramanathapuram (14 km) and Paramakudi (27 km) which has computerised reservation counters under Madurai division. Madurai division repeatedly has received the award for being the best-maintained station in the Southern Railway. The railway station code for Paramakudi is PMK and Ramamnathapuram is RMD. It is connected to Indian cities and towns including Chennai, Madurai, Rameshwaram, Trichy (by Sethu exp, Chennai exp and Passenger).

=== Road ===
The nearest major bus terminals are Ramanathapuram, Paramakudi and Sathirakudi. Apart from government and private buses, three-wheeled, black and yellow auto-rickshaws, referred to as autos or share autos are available for travel within and around the village. There are also van available where commuters can pay fixed fare depends on destination and hire. Nearest major National Highways:

NH-49: Madurai–Rameswaram

At the moment, the bus terminal of Veeravanoor is full of standing water and the Panchayat plan to clean up the area.

=== Air ===
The nearby airport is Madurai Airport which is approximately 100 km (62 mi) from Veeravanoor, and it offers flights to major cities in southern and western India.
