= Karkathakudi =

- Town
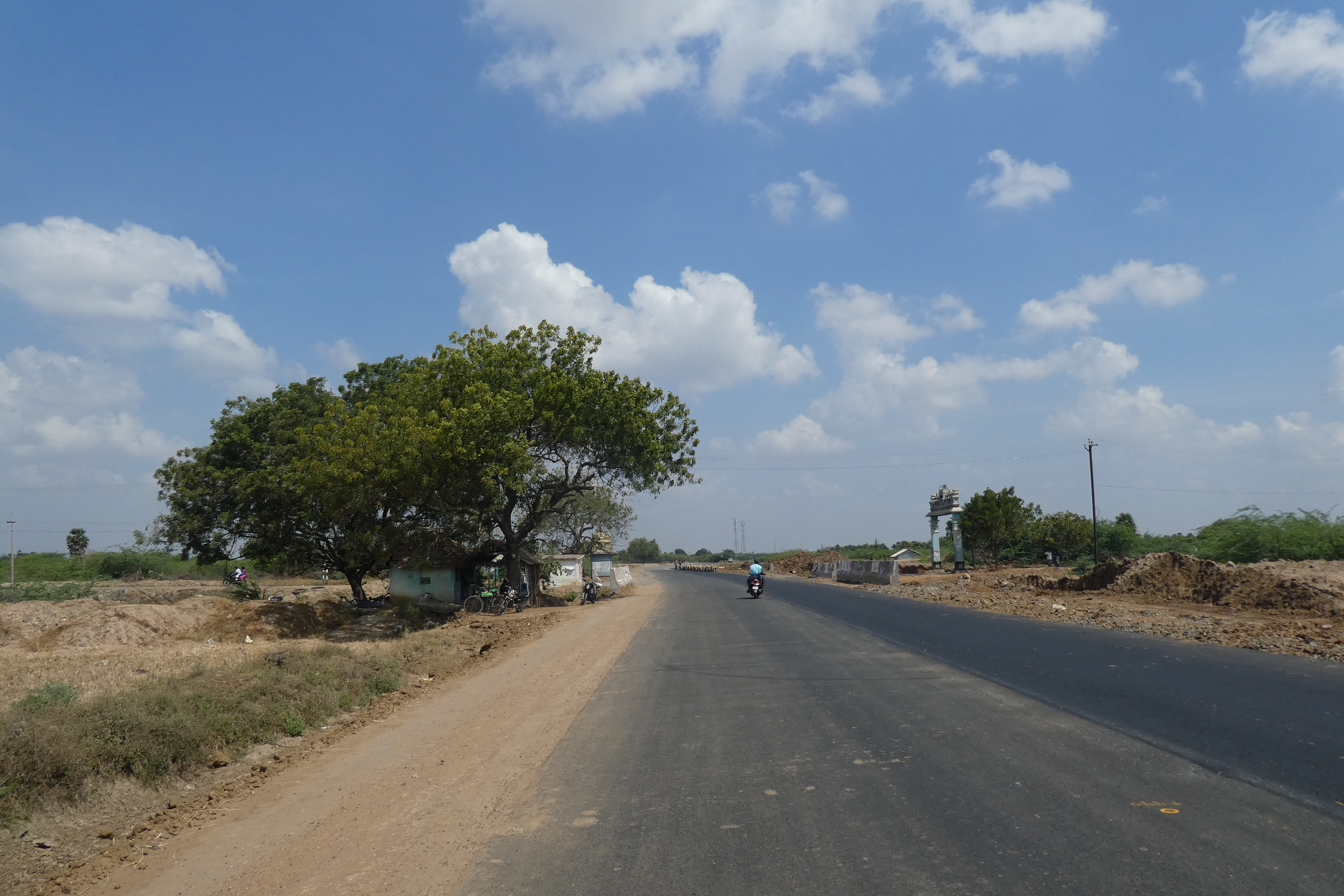
- Road near Karkathakudi in 2020

- Location in Tamil Nadu, India
- Coordinates: 9.7417327°N 78.8807416°E
- Country: India
- State: Tamil Nadu
- District: Ramanathapuram district

Languages
  - Official: Tamil
- Time zone: UTC+5:30 (IST)
- Vehicle registration: TN 65

Karkathakudi is a small town and panchayat located in the Ramanathapuram district of Tamil Nadu state, India. The villages under the panchayat of Karkathakudi are Siruvandal, Peruvandal, Melapanaiyur, Keelapanaiyur, Gudalur, and Karungudi. Karkathakudi contains 1000 houses and about 3000 people living here. It is the main panchayat under Thiruvadanai taluk.

== Languages ==
The native language of Karkathakudi is Tamil and most of the village people speak Tamil, and the well-educated people can speak in English.

== Education ==
The main school located within the town itself is Primary School Karkathakudi.
