= Kadaladi =

- Town
- Location in Tamil Nadu, India
- Coordinates: 9.227392°N 78.472595°E
- Country: India
- State: Tamil Nadu
- District: Ramanathapuram
- Elevation: 70 m (230 ft)

Population (2002)
  - Total: 13,135

Languages
  - Official: Tamil
- Time zone: UTC+5:30 (IST)
- PIN: 623703
- Telephone code: 4576
- Vehicle registration: TN 65

Kadaladi is a village in the Indian state of Tamil Nadu. It is located 108 km from Madurai. Kadaladi is situated between Mudukulathur and Sayalgudi. It is a Taluk headquarters and a revenue region of Ramanathapuram district.

== History ==
Trade between Tamil Nadu and Sri Lanka traveled through this town. Archaeologists found Jain idols of the 12th century. The fort at Kottaimedu was built in the 17th century, built on the banks of the Gundaaru River.

In pursuance to the Delimitation Act, 2002, Kadaladi merged with Mudhukulathur constituency in 2007 for representation in the Tamil Nadu Legislative Assembly and continued as part of Ramanathapuram Lok Sabha constituency.

== Demography ==
As of 2001 India census, Kadaladi had a population of 13,135. Males constituted 48% of the population and females 52%. Kadaladi had an average literacy rate of 75%, higher than the national average of 59.5%: male literacy was 80%, and female literacy 71%. In Kadaladi, 12% of the population were under six years of age.

== Culture ==
Sri Madaswamy Temple, Sri Pathirakali Amman and Sri Muthu Mariyamman Temple, Sri KamatchiAmman Temple and Sri Muthumariamman Temple are the major temples in the region. Sri Pathirakali Amman, Sri Kamatchi Amman and Sri Santhanamariyamman are worshipped there. Mosques and churches are present.

Sandhan Koodu festival is celebrated by Muslims. Matha Chariot Process is celebrated by people of all religions.

Nadar, Maravars, and Yadav community people are in large numbers.

== Infrastructure ==
A bus stand, three main bazaars, and trade streets are present. The market is open on Fridays.

== Education ==
The 19 schools include nine primary, two upper primary, five secondary and 3 higher secondary. An arts and science college is present. Schools include:

- Government Higher Secondary School - Kadaladi
- Saraswathi Widyalaya Metriculation School - Kadaladi
- Kamarajar Metriculation School - Kadaladi
- Government Middle School - Kadaladi (Melur)
- Government Elementary School - Kadaladi
- Govt Arts & Science college - Kadaladi
- sangeetha matriculation school-kadaladi

== Economy ==
Agriculture and animal breeding are the main businesses of the people of the region. Dairy farms are widespread.

== Politics ==
Kadaladi is part of Ramanathapuram (Lok Sabha constituency). In 2007, Kadaladi merged with Mudhukulathur constituency for representation in the Tamil Nadu Legislative Assembly.

== Notables ==
- Thiru. S.Balakrishnan, and popularly known as So.Ba, a veteran Indian politician, President of Tamil Nadu Congress Committee (TNCC) and Member of the Legislative Assembly of Tamil Nadu for eighteen years and the Leader of the Opposition in the Tamil Nadu Legislative Assembly (Eleventh Assembly 1996-2001)
