= Kuruvadi =

Kuruvadi Kuruvadi Small Street
- Small Street
- Location in Tamil Nadu, India Kuruvadi (India)
- Coordinates: 9°11′40″N 78°23′45″E
- Country: India
- State: Tamil Nadu
- District: Ramanathapuram
- Elevation: 14 m (46 ft)

Population (2001)
  - Total: 4,793

Languages
  - Official: Tamil & English
- Time zone: UTC+5:30 (IST)

Kuruvadi is a Town panchayat in Ramanathapuram district Kadaladi Taluk in the India state of Tamil Nadu.
