= Upputanni Island =

Coordinates: 09°05′26″N 78°29′29″E

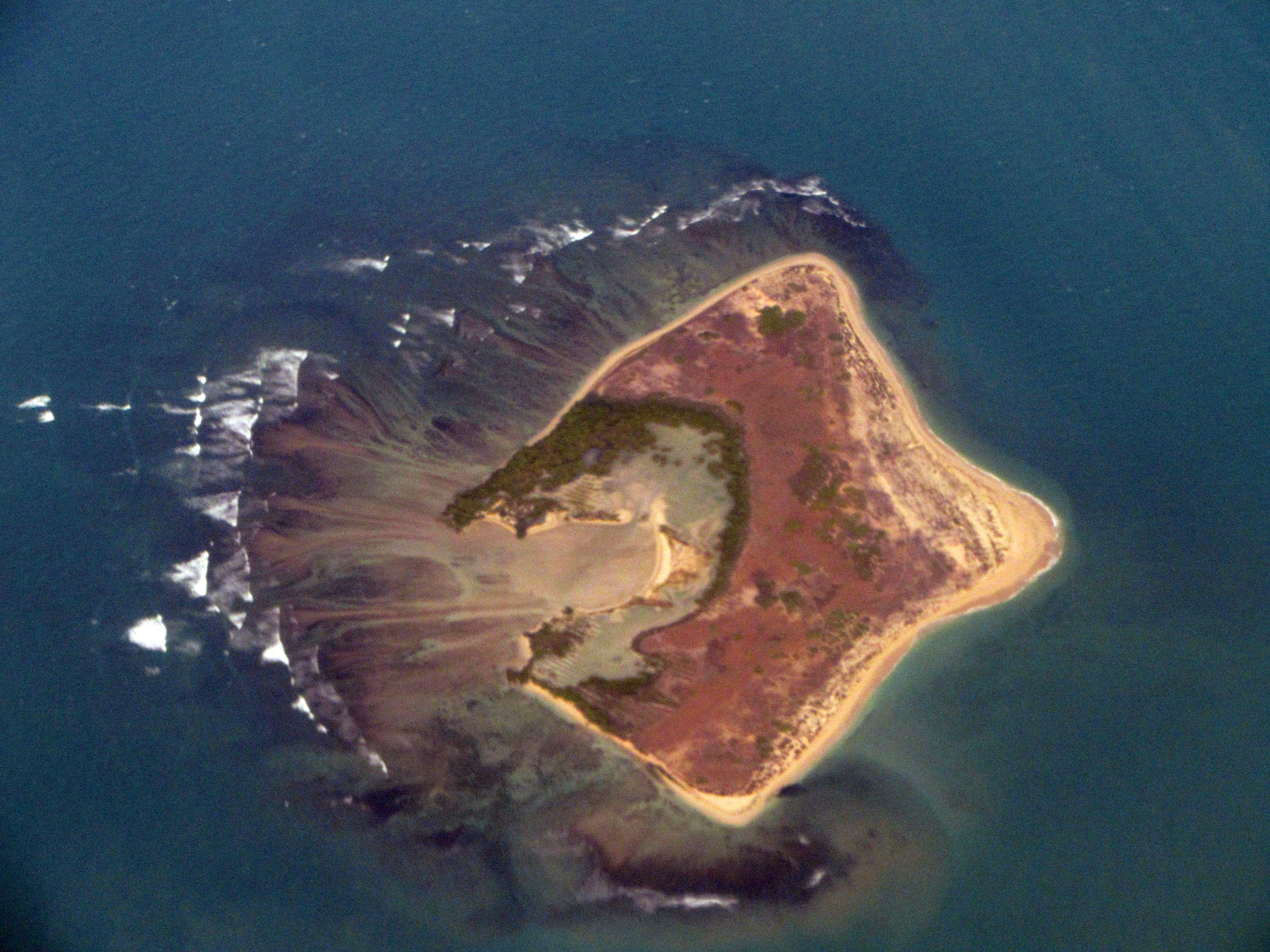
Aerial photo of the island.

Upputanni is an uninhabited island situated in the Gulf of Mannar. It is located at a distance of about 5 km (3.1 mi) from the coast of Tamil Nadu, India and is a part of the Kadaladi taluk of Ramanathapuram district, Tamil Nadu.
