= G. Muniyasamy =

Indian politician

G Muniyasamy

Ex.Chairman of Tamil Nadu Warehousing Corporation
- In office 18 June 2013 – 18 June 2014

Personal details
- Born: 2 January 1958 (age 68) Ramanathapuram, Tamil Nadu
- Party: AIADMK
- Spouse: M Muniyammal

G Muniyasamy (Tamil: G முனியசாமி) (born 2 January 1958 in Ramanathapuram Tamil Nadu) is a politician from Indian state of Tamil Nadu.

On 18 June 2013, he was appointed as the Chairman of Tamil Nadu Warehousing Corporation. He previously served as the AIADMK District Secretary, Ramanathapuram.

== Political career ==
- [1996-2001] Union Chairman Mandapam, Ramanathapuram District.
- [2000-2002] District Secretary AIADMK, Ramanathapuram District.
- [2003-2004] District Secretary AIADMK, Ramanathapuram District.
- [2006-2011] District Councilor Ramanathapuram District.
- [2013] District Secretary AIADMK, Ramanathapuram District.
- [2013-2014] Chairman of Tamil Nadu Warehousing Corporation
