= Uthirakosamangai =

Temple in India

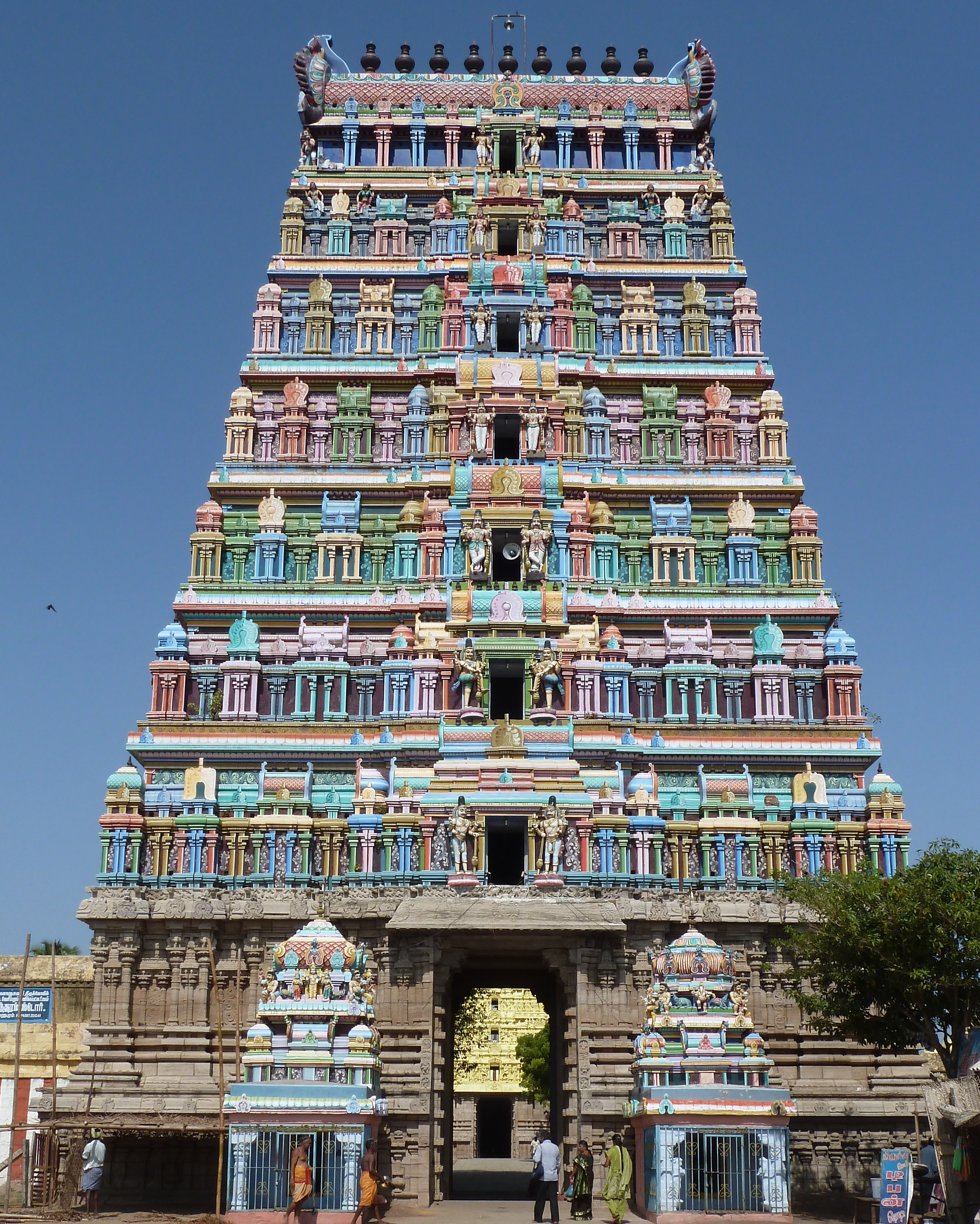
- Entrance Vihmana of the temple

- Location in Tamil Nadu

Religion
- Affiliation: Hinduism
- District: Ramanathapuram
- Deity: Mangaleswarar(Shiva) Mangalambigai(Parvati)
- Features: Temple tank: Agni

Location
- Location: Uthirakosamangai
- State: Tamil Nadu
- Country: India
- Coordinates: 9°19′N 78°44′E

Architecture
- Type: Tamil architecture

Uthirakosamangai, also known as Mangalanatha Swamy temple, is a Shiva temple situated near Ramanathapuram in the Ramanathapuram district of Tamil Nadu. Uthirakosamangai temple is located on an area of about 20 acres.

The temple is considered sacred along the lines of Ramanathapuram, Sethu Madhava Theertham and Lakshmana Theertham. The temple is a prominent tourist destination of Ramanathapuram district.

The temple has numerous shrines, with those of Mangalanathar, Mangalambigai and Natarajar being the most prominent. The temple houses a 6 ft (1.8 m) tall ancient maragatha Nataraja idol carved out of emerald, being one of its kind. The temple has six daily rituals at various times from 5:30 a.m. to 8 p.m., and six yearly festivals on its calendar. The temple is maintained and administered by the Hindu Religious and Endowment Board of the Government of Tamil Nadu.

== Legend ==
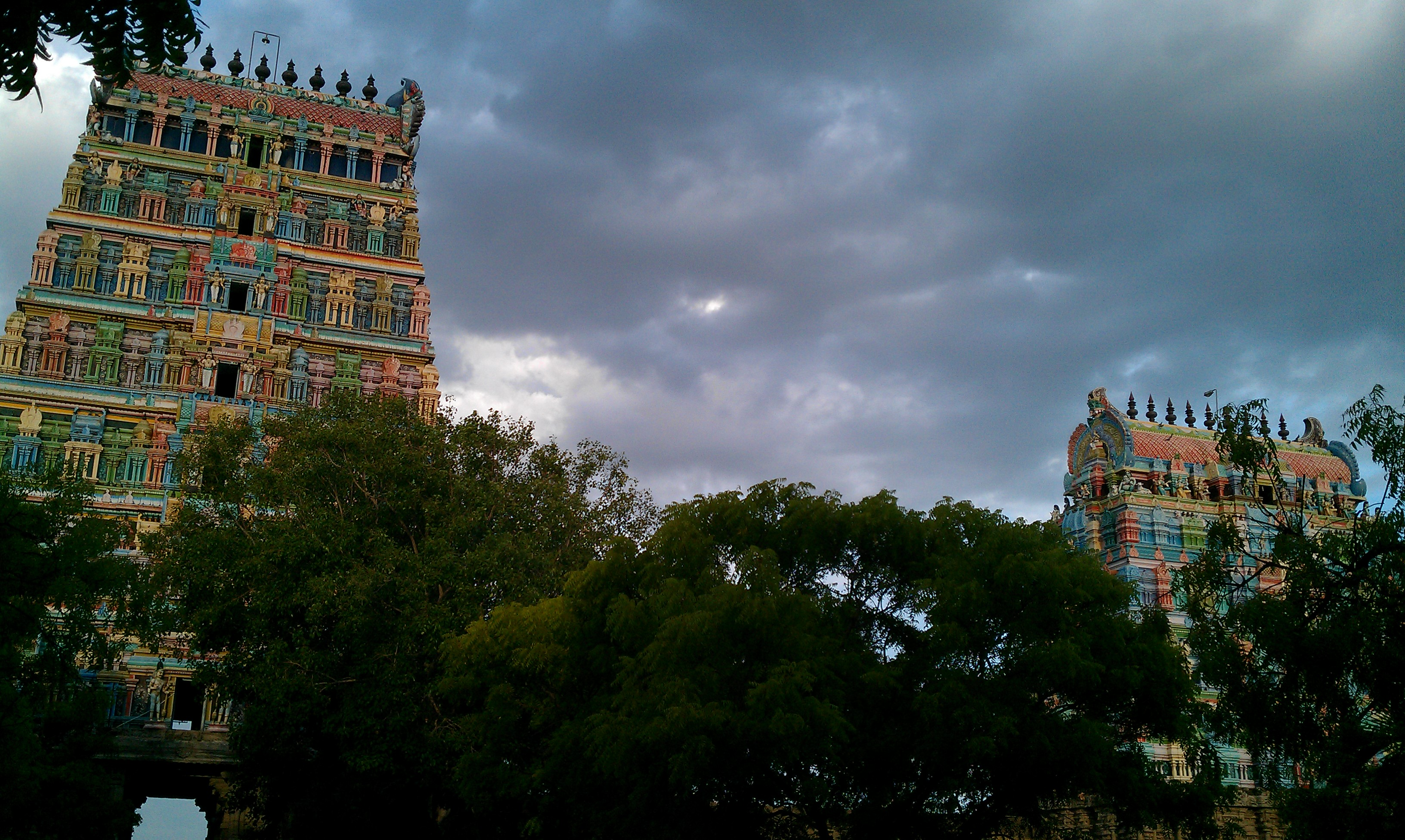
View of the temple towers

As per Hindu legend, once hundreds of rishis (ascetics) performed penance worshipping Shiva. Shiva told the rishis that he would appear in the form of a fireball to acknowledge the penance of Mandothari, the wife of king Ravana in Sri Lanka. Shiva appeared in the form of a small child in Ravana's palace. Ravana lifted the beautiful child and there was a small wound out of it. Simultaneously, there was a fireball out of the Agni Theertham (temple tank), which the rishis felt was on account of Shiva attacking Ravana. Out of a thousand, 999 killed themselves by falling in the fire, while one of them remained to save the vedic books. Shiva was pleased by the rishi and appeared as Sahasralingam (thousand lingams) for the 999 and one more for himself in the temple. The single rishi was believed to have emerged later as Manickavasgar in his later birth.

== History ==
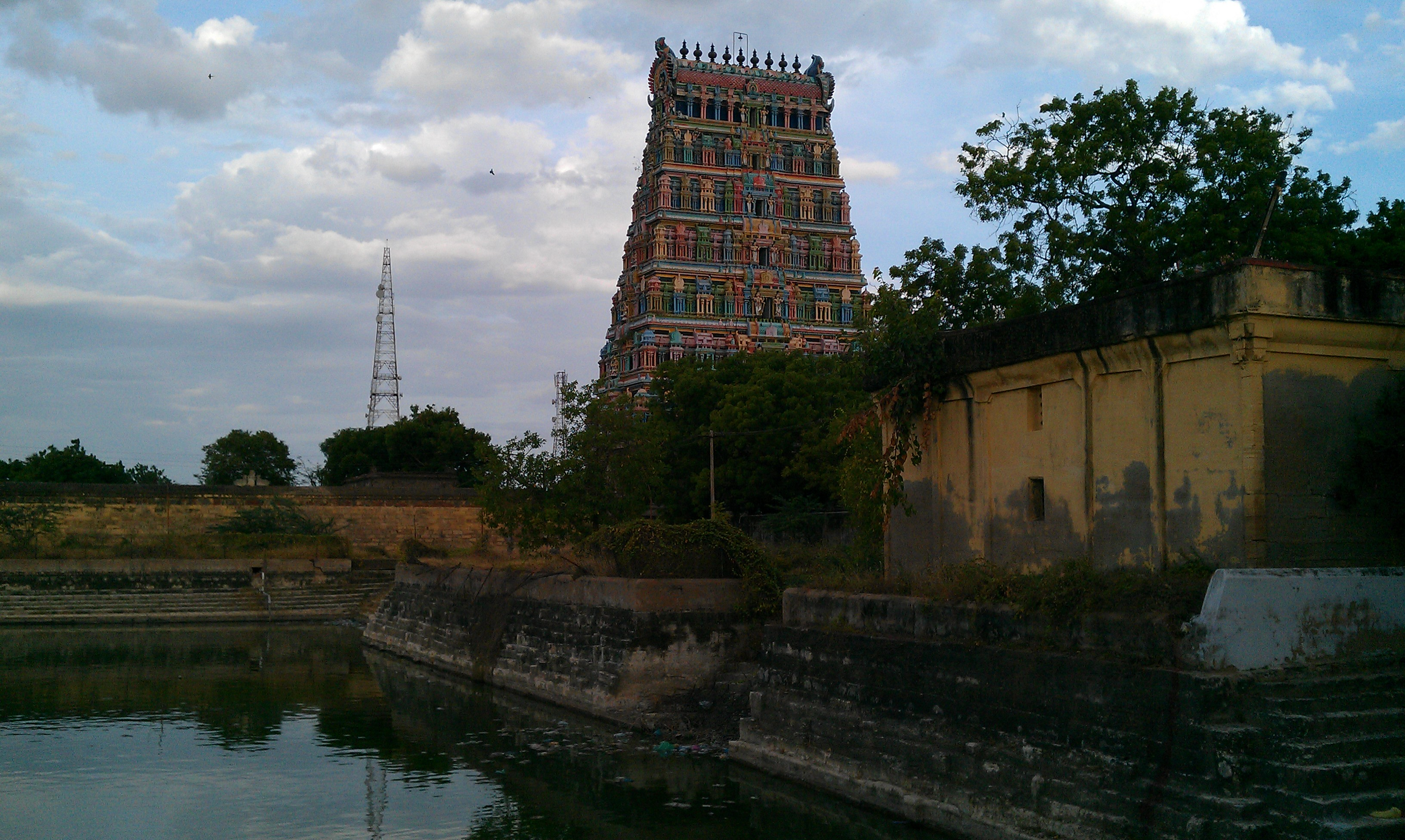
View of the temple tower and the temple tank

The temple has a history dating back 3,000 years. It is spread across about 20 acres of land and is believed to have been constructed by 1,000 Shiva devotees who attained Moksha (spiritual liberation) simultaneously.

Within the temple complex are shrines dedicated to Mangalanathar Swami, Mangaleswari Amman, Natarajar, Suyambulingam, Bhairavar, Dhakshinamoorthy, Chandikeswarar, and Balabhairav. There is also a sacred temple pool.

The temple boasts five towers, including seven-tiered royal towers. Two magnificent yalis (mythical lion-like creatures) guard the entrance with stone balls in their mouths, which visitors can move by hand.

The temple is home to the priceless emerald statue of Sage Mangaleswarar, standing at five and a half feet tall. Nataraja, the cosmic dancing form of Shiva, is displayed in sandalwood cups throughout the year. It is believed to be one of the earliest Shiva temples in the world, with only the Sun, Moon, and Mars representing the celestial bodies when the temple was established.

According to legend, Mandothari, the wife of Ravana, sought to marry the most devoted Shiva worshipper. Shiva entrusted a sacred scripture to sages for safekeeping. When Ravana attempted to touch a child (Shiva in disguise), Shiva transformed into Agni, causing chaos. The sages, fearing Shiva's wrath, jumped into a sacred pool, which came to be known as "Agni Theertham." Only Manikkavacakar, a sage, saved the scripture. As a result, Manikkavacakar is honored in the temple with a lingam.

The temple's name, Uttirakosamangai, stems from Shiva's teachings to Parvati about sacred scriptures. During the reign of the Pandyan kings, the temple was a prominent place, and their capital was Uttarakosamangai.

The temple hosts several important festivals, including Chithirai, Tirukkalyanam, Thervila, and Arudra Darshan.

== Architecture ==
The temple is located 32 km east from Paramakkudi and 17 km west from Ramanathapuram. The temple has a seven-tiered rajagopuram (gateway tower). The temple has numerous shrines, with those of Mangalanathar, Mangalambigai and Natarajar being the most prominent. There are separate shrines for Mangalanathar (Shiva) in the form of a lingam and Mangalambigai. There is a 6 ft (1.8 m) tall ancient maragatha Nataraja idol carved out of emerald inside the temple. A hall of Saharasralingam has a thousand lingams enshrined in it. At the entrance of the main precinct, the temple features exquisite stone carvings of Yali (mythological dragon), depicted with a rolling stone ball inside its mouth. The granite images of the deities Ganesha (son of Shiva and god of wisdom), Murugan (son of Shiva), Nandi, and Navagraha (nine planetary deities) are located in the hall leading to the sanctum. As in other Shiva temples of Tamil Nadu, the first precinct or the walls around the sanctum of Erumbeeswarar have images of Thenmugaparaman (Dakshinamurthy-Shiva as the Teacher), Durga (warrior-goddess) and Chandikeswarar (a saint and devotee of Shiva).

== Worship and festivals ==
The temple priests perform puja during festivals and on a daily basis. Like other Shiva temples of Tamil Nadu, the priests belong to the Shaiva community, a Brahmin sub-caste. The temple rituals are performed six times a day: Ushathkalam at 5:30 a.m., Kalasanthi at 8:00 a.m., Uchikalam at 10:00 a.m., Sayarakshai at 5:00 p.m., Irandamkalam at 7:00 p.m. and Ardha Jamam at 8:00 p.m. Each ritual comprises four steps: abhisheka (sacred bath), alangaram (decoration), naivethanam (food offering) and deepa aradanai (waving of lamps) for all the deities in the temple. The worship is held amidst music with nagaswaram (pipe instrument), religious instructions in the Vedas (sacred texts) read by priests and prostration by worshippers in front of the temple mast. There are weekly rituals like somavaram (Monday) and sukravaram (Friday), fortnightly rituals like pradosham and monthly festivals like amavasai (new moon day), kiruthigai, pournami (full moon day) and sathurthi. The major festivals of the temple are Tirukalyana Vaibhavam (sacred marriage) during the Tamil month of Chittirai (April–May), Vasanthotsavam during Vaigasi (May–June), Pathunal Siva Uthsavam during Aaani (July–August), Annabishekam during Aipasi (October–November), Tiruvathidirai during Margazhi (December–January) and Sivarathri during Masi (February–March). The Tiruvathidirai festival in December attracts a large number of tourists.

This temple contains many important religious objects, including: a self-made lingam; two statues of Nandi, Shiva's sacred bull, are present; a sahasra lingam with a thousand carved lingams, representing the honor of the 1,000 rishis; a 6-foot-tall (1.8m) idol of Nataraja. It's uniquely made of emerald and is kept covered in sandal paste throughout the year. On the day before Arudra day, the paste is removed, and the idol is revealed to the public.

The temple has been glorified by the hymns of the 9th-century saint Manickavasagar and the 15th-century saint Arunagirinathar.

== Religious significance ==
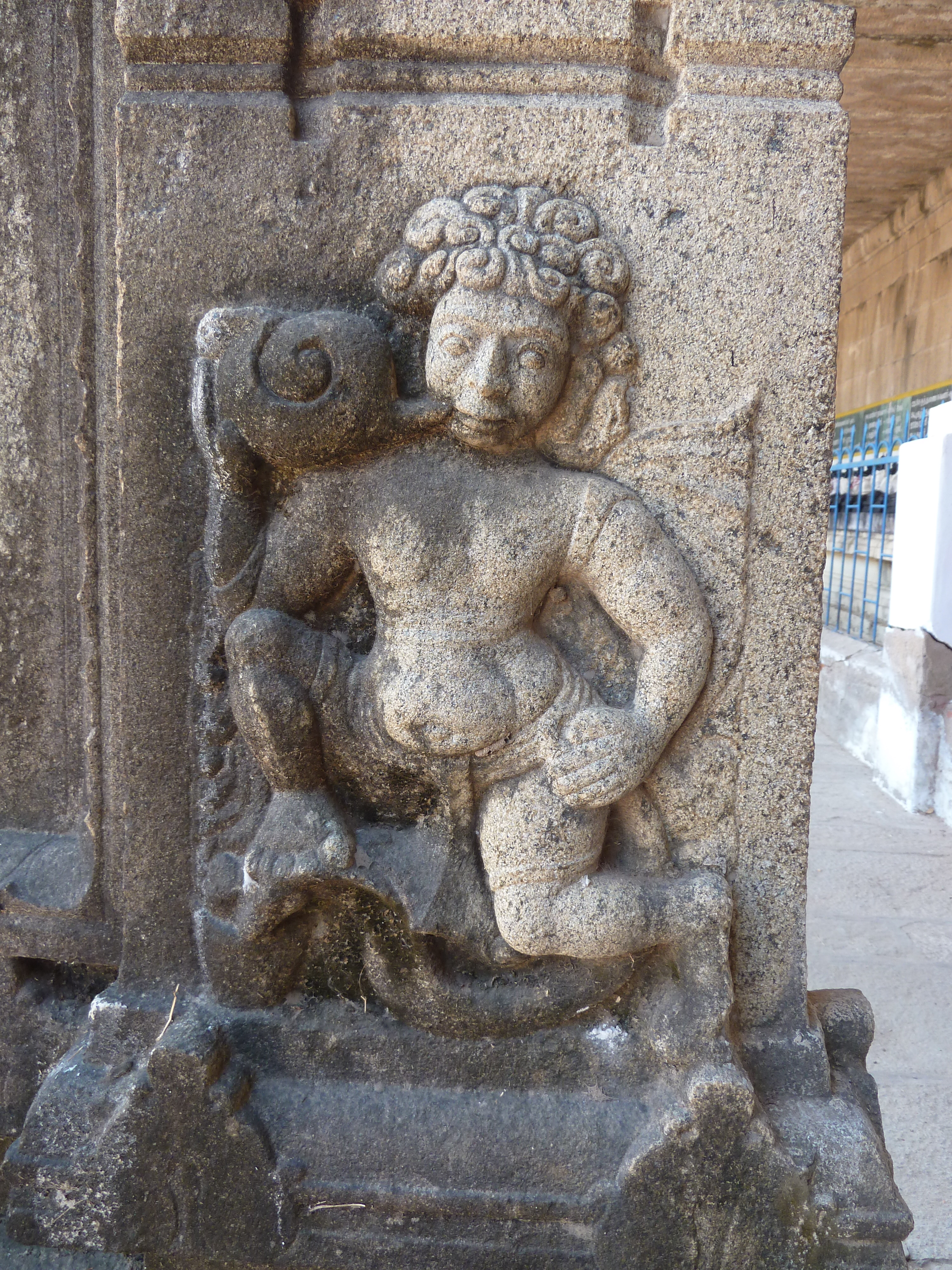
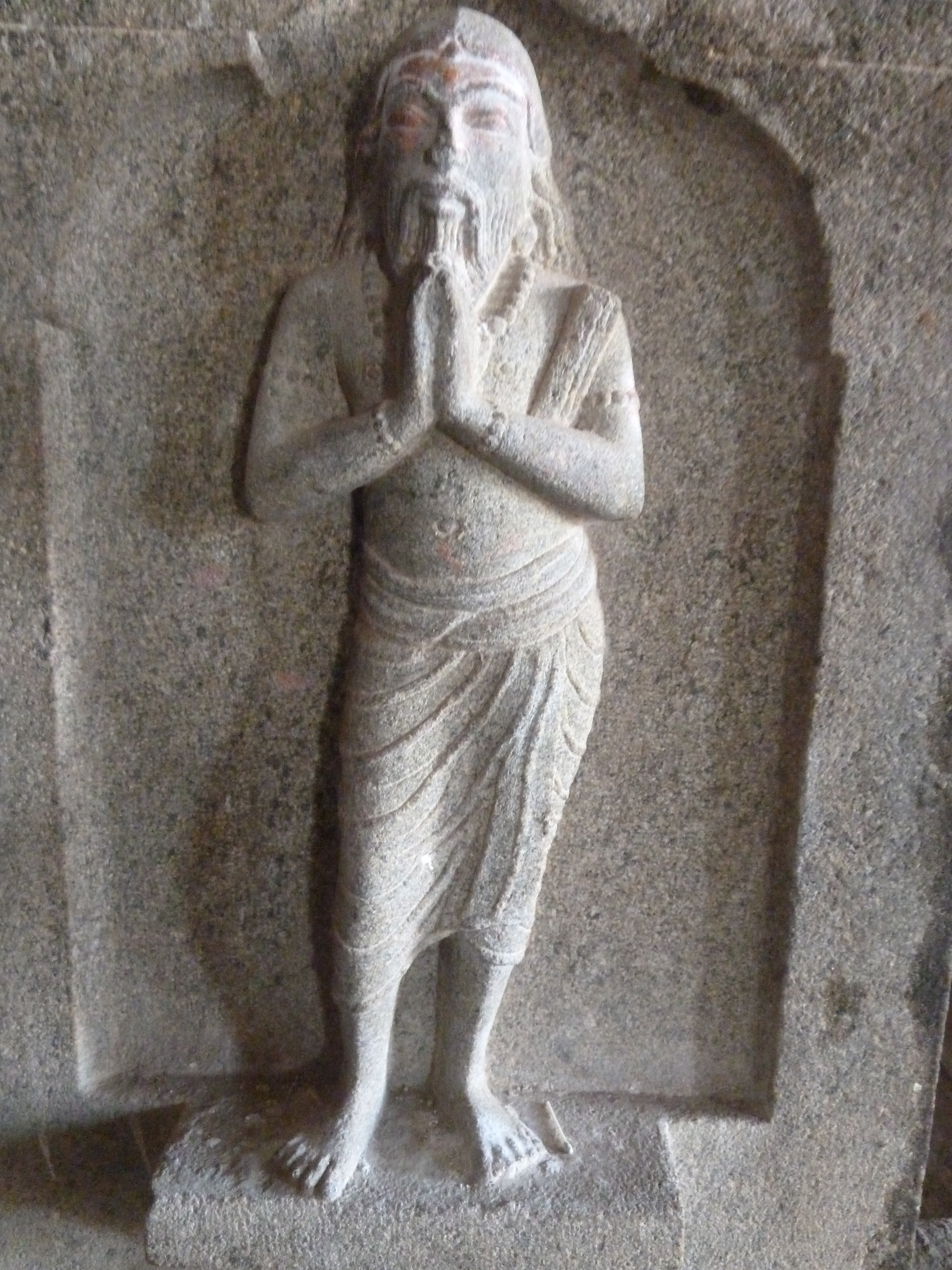
Sculptures on the pillars of the temple

The temple is considered sacred along the lines of Ramanathapuram, Sethu Madhava Theertham and Lakshmana Theertham. The emerald image of Nataraja is anointed with sandal paste round the year except on Tiruvathidirai festival day when special worship is practiced. It is believed that even small vibrations can damage the image and hence no percussion instruments are used during worship practices. The front hall has lingams made of Padigam (spatika), that are anointed with cooked rice every afternoon. As per Hindu legend, Vishnu and Brahma contested for superiority; Shiva appeared as a flame, and challenged them to find his source. Brahma took the form of a swan, and flew to the sky to see the top of the flame, while Vishnu became the boar Varaha, and sought its base. Neither Brahma nor Vishnu could find the source, and while Vishnu conceded his defeat, Brahma lied with the help of a thazhambu (Pandanus odorifer flower / Screw Pine Flower / Ketaki flower) and said he had found the pinnacle. In punishment, Shiva ordained that Brahma would never have temples on earth in his worship and all Shiva temples do not use thazhambu during worship practices. This is one such temple where thazhambu is still used for worship practices. This story is found in Shaivaite scriptures.

Manickavasagar, the 9th century Tamil saivite saint poet, has revered Mangalanathar and the temple in his verses in Thiruvasakam, compiled as the Eighth Tirumurai. Arunagirinathar, a 15th-century Tamil poet, has composed Tamil hymns glorifying Murugan in the temple. As per Hindu legend, Muruga was awarded the Airavata (white elephant) of the celestial deity Indra at this place.
