= Kattiyanenthal =

Kattiyanenthal is a village in Ramanathapuram district, Tamil Nadu state, southern India.
