= Thiruvetriyur (Ramanathapuram) =

Thiruvetriyur Jayapuram
- Village
- Location within Tamil Nadu Location within India
- Coordinates: 9°42′29″N 78°56′58″E
- Country: India
- State: Tamil Nadu
- District: Ramanathapuram
- Subdistrict: Tiruvadanai
- Elevation: 41 m (135 ft)

Population (4000)
  - Total: 4,000
- Time zone: UTC+05:30 (IST)

Thiruvetriyur is a Village in Tiruvadanai taluk, Ramanathapuram district, Tamil Nadu in southern India.

The place is famous for ancient Bagampriyal Kovil. Manirethinam R
