= Mukkulathor =

Group of three Indian castes

Mukkulathor (Thevar)
Total population
- 94,33,646 (estimated 2016)

Regions with significant populations
- Central and Southern Tamil Nadu

Languages
- Tamil

Religion
- Hinduism

The Mukkulathor people, who are also collectively known as Thevar, are a community or group of communities native to the central and southern districts of Tamil Nadu, India. They comprise the Agamudayar, Kallar, and Maravar communities that share a common myth of origin and claim to have once been members of various ancient South Indian dynasties.

== Origins and development ==
The terms Mukkulathor and Thevar are used synonymously. According to R. Muthulakshmi of Madurai Kamaraj University, Thevar "literally means celestial beings or divine-natured people" and Mukkulathor means "three clans united together". The three constituent communities of Agamudayar, Kallar and Maravar believe themselves to share a common myth of origin formed through being the offspring of a relationship between Indra and a celestial woman. The three groups traditionally each believe themselves to be superior to their fellow Mukkulathors.

While they share a common mythological ancestor, the three communities also claim ancestral differences. Each of the Thevar communities claim descent from an ancient Moovendar dynasty in the Sangam era: Agamudayar consider themselves to be descendants of the Chera dynasty, the Kallars the Cholas and the Maravars the Pandyas. The anthropologist Susan Bayly notes that both the Kallar and Maravar communities are relatively new caste entities. Both names were originally granted to people as titles by poligars (local chieftains) but the holders were not exposed to caste-defining influences such as Brahmanic Hinduism, the concept of varna and practices such as endogamy until the late 18th century. She says that the claims of distinct caste status "were clearly not ancient facts of life in the Tamil Nadu region. Insofar as these people of the turbulent poligar country really did become castes, their bonds of affinity were shaped in the relatively recent past". Thereafter, the evolution as a caste developed as a result of various influences, including increased interaction with other groups as a consequence of jungle clearances, state-building and ideological shifts. Anthropologist Diane P. Mines affirms that the contemporary characterisation of the Thevar community derives from its precolonial past but was reified under the British Raj. For instance, in 1911 the British designated the Thevars a "criminal caste", which Mines surmises arose from the community's precolonial role as village guardians or local chieftains but was precipitated by their resistance to British rule.

In the period following Indian independence, the Mukkulathor or the Thevars have grown into, what Mines calls, a "super-caste" that combines the three previously distinct communities, emphasises their similarities and shared historical roles, and forms a consolidated base of support for the AIADMK political party.

== Demographics ==
The Mukkulathor communities live mostly in central and southern areas of Tamil Nadu, such as Madurai, Theni, Dindigul, Sivagangai, Pudukottai, Ramanathapuram, Thanjavur, Thiruvarur, Nagapattinam, Tiruchirapalli, and Thirunelveli. They have been recorded as practising female infanticide as recently as the 1990s. (Note: Female infanticide and foeticide have been significant practises among some communities in various areas of Tamil Nadu. The state government has sought to address these through legislated schemes as recently as 2011.)

Although the Mukkulathor own significant amounts of land, the sociologist Hugo Gorringe noted in 2005 that "their educational and economic achievements have been negligible", with many being small farmers or agricultural labourers. The community has mostly been given the status of Backward Class (BC) by the Government of Tamil Nadu, although some subgroups are omitted. They are mostly listed as Other Backward Classes (OBC) by the National Commission for Backward Classes.

== Politics ==
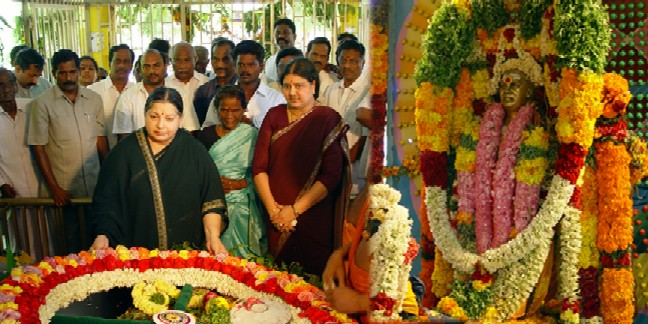
Jayalalithaa with Sasikala in Early 2000s at Pasumpon Thevar Memorial

Human Rights Watch has documented allegations that the members of the government of Jayalalitha, including the chief minister herself, favoured the Mukkalathors during the 1990s, leading to them gaining influential positions in the police and in politics. The Mukkalathor community at that time was the most populous of the backward classes in the state but Dalit communities - notably, the Pallars - were becoming increasingly wealthy and aspirational. (Note: Dalits in Tamil Nadu have become less dependent on Mukkulathors for employment due to the effects of India's system of positive discrimination and the trend towards sending relatives abroad to earn a living, notably to the Gulf States.) The improvement of Dalit circumstances, together with a general rise in Dalit activism, led to many clashes with the Mukkulathors in rural areas. These clashes often involved the collusion of the police, who aided detention of so-called Dalit activists, assaults on people (especially women), and forcible displacement from Dalit villages.

The Mukkulathors celebrate the coincident birth and death anniversary of U. Muthuramalingam Thevar (also spelled Mathuramaliga Thevar; 1908–1963) annually in October. He was a noted politician from the community and the event, known as Thevar Jayanthi, gained the approval of the Government of Tamil Nadu in 1993, which enabled the event to obtain police protection, road closures and the like. The Mukkulathors treat Muthuramalingam Thevar as a deity (Theivathirumagan) and it was from this time that the Jayanthi shifted from being a fairly minor affair to one of considerable significance. The Dalit surge since the 1980s was countered by the growth of the Jayanthi, which gave the Mukkulathors an opportunity to react against the Dalits and assert their own perceived superiority, historic status as rulers, and caste pride. Damodraran Karthikeyan, a journalist-turned-academic, notes the historic animosity between the two groups and that "The institutionalised nature of Thevar Jayanthi, through consciously created myths surrounding Mathuramaliga Thevar, his iconisation, canonisation and the construction of a social identity provides a point of entry to study the process of how political power is ritually constructed through social ceremony."

== Martial arts ==
Thevars, traditionally practise a Tamil martial art variously known as Adimurai, chinna adi and varna ati. In recent years, since 1958, these have been referred to as Southern-style Kalaripayattu, although they are distinct from the ancient martial art of Kalaripayattu itself that was historically the style found in Kerala. This and other displays of aggression are prominent during Thevar Jayanthi.

== Notable people ==
- U. Muthuramalingam Thevar
