= Kamuthi taluk =

Kamuthi taluk is a taluk of Ramanathapuram district of the Indian state of Tamil Nadu. The headquarters of the taluk is the town of Kamuthi.

== Demographics ==
According to the 2011 census, the taluk of Kamuthi had a population of 135,660 with 68,600 males and 67,060 females. There were 978 women for every 1000 men. The taluk had a literacy rate of 70.12. Child population in the age group below 6 was 7,070 Males and 6,770 Females.
