= Krusadai Island =

Uninhabited island belonging to India

- Interactive map of Krusadai Island

Geography
- Coordinates: 9.20°N 79.17°E
- Area: 0.658 km^{2} (0.254 sq mi)

Administration
- India
- State: Tamil Nadu
- District: Ramanathapuram
- Taluk: Rameswaram

Krusadai Island is an uninhabited island in the Gulf of Mannar situated south of Pamban Island. The island belongs to India and forms a part of the Gulf of Mannar Marine National Park.
