= Kadaladi taluk =

Coordinates: 9.227392°N 78.472595°E

Kadaladi taluk is a taluk of Ramanathapuram district of the Indian state of Tamil Nadu. The headquarters of the taluk is the town of Kadaladi.

== Demographics ==
According to the 2011 census, the taluk of Kadaladi had a population of 144,386 with 73,001 males and 71,385 females. There were 978 women for every 1000 men. The taluk had a literacy rate of 69.59. Child population in the age group below 6 was 7,314 Males and 6,945 Females.

== Revenue Villages under Kadaladi Taluk ==
There are a total of 43 revenue villages under Kadaladi Taluk.

1. A.nedunkulam
2. A.usilankulam
3. Alavankulam
4. Appanur
5. Avathandai
6. Iruveli
7. K.veppankulam
8. Kadaladi
9. Kadugusandai
10. Kannirajapuram
11. Keelakidaram
12. Keelaselvanur
13. Keerandai
14. Kokkarasankottai
15. Kondunallanpatti
16. Kurichikulam
17. Kuthiraimozhi
18. M.karisalkulam
19. Marandai
20. Mariyur
21. Meenangudi
22. Melakidaram
23. Melaselvanur
24. Mookkaiyur
25. Narippaiyur
26. Orivayal
27. Oruvanendal
28. Panivasal
29. Peilkulam
30. Periyakulam
31. Pooppandiyapuram
32. Pramanankulam
33. Punavasal
34. S.tharaikudi
35. S.vagaikulam
36. Sayalkudi
37. Sikkal
38. Sippikulam
39. Siraikulam
40. T.karisalkulam
41. T.m.kottai
42. T.veppankulam
43. Thanichiyam
44. Valinokkam
