= Mudukulathur taluk =

Indian district

Population
  - Total: 113,361

Mudukulathur taluk is a taluk of Ramanathapuram district of the Indian state of Tamil Nadu. The headquarters of the taluk is Mudukulathur.

== Demographics ==
According to the 2011 census, the taluk had a population of 113,361 with 56,464 males and 56,897 females, a ratio of 1008 women for every 1000 men. It has a large number of Appanad Maravars along with Yadav. The taluk had a literacy rate of 68. Child population in the age group below 6 was 5,253 Males and 5,217 Females.
