= Tiruvadanai taluk =

Population
  - Total: 181,591

Tiruvadanai taluk is a taluk of Ramanathapuram district of the Indian state of Tamil Nadu. The headquarters of the taluk is Tiruvadanai.

== Demographics ==
According to the 2011 census, the taluk of Tiruvadanai had a population of 181,591 with 92,039 males and 89,552 females, or 973 women for every 1000 men. The taluk had a literacy rate of 68.14. Child population in the age group below 6 was 8,924 Males and 8,942 Females.

== Divisions ==
As of 2011, Tiruvadanai taluk administered forty-seven panchayat villages.
