= Kamuthi =

- Panchayat town
- Kamuthi, Tamil Nadu
- Coordinates: 9.409700°N 78.364300°E
- Country: India
- State: Tamil Nadu
- District: Ramanathapuram District

Government
  - Type: Panchayat Town
  - Body: Kamuthi Panchayat Raj
- Elevation: 64 m (210 ft)

Population (2011)
  - Total: 14,754

Languages
  - Official: Tamil
- Time zone: UTC+5:30 (IST)
- PIN: 623 603
- Telephone code: 91 4576
- Sex ratio: 48:52 ♂/♀

Kamuthi also spelled Kamudi actually stands for Kavinmigu Mullai Thirunagar. Kamuthi is a Panchayat town in Ramanathapuram district in the Indian state of Tamil Nadu.

Kamuthi is known for being the home of the Kamuthi Solar Power Project, a large solar power plant.

Kamuthi town is situated in Ramanathapuram District, Tamil Nadu. The Kamuthi town has a population of 14754, male population is 7416 and female population is 7338 as per the Census 2011 data. Population of children under the age of 0-6 is 1514, male child population under the age of six is 766 and female child population under the age of six is 748. The total literacy rate of Kamuthi city is 88.56%, the male literacy rate is 93.8% and the female literacy rate is 83.28%. In Kamuthi the female sex ratio is 989 per 1000 male persons. Child sex ratio is 977 per 1000 male child under the age of six. The total number of households in Kamuthi is 3379.

== Demographics ==
Kamuthi is about 90 km from Madurai. It belongs to the Mudukulathur Legislative Constituency. As of 2001 India census.
