= Sayalgudi =

- Town
- Sayalgudi, Tamil Nadu
- Coordinates: 9°10′04.4″N 78°26′44.5″E
- Country: India
- State: Tamil Nadu
- District: Ramanathapuram

Government
  - Type: Town Panchayat
  - Body: Sayalgudi Peruratchi
- Elevation: 34 m (112 ft)

Population (2001)
  - Total: 12,049

Languages
  - Official: Tamil
- Time zone: UTC+5:30 (IST)
- Postal code: 623120
- Vehicle registration: TN65

Sayalgudi is a town panchayat in Ramanathapuram district of Tamil Nadu State in India. It is located west of the district along the East Coast Highway towards Kanyakumari. The state highway SH200 passes through the town connecting districts of Thoothukudi and Tirunelveli. It surrounded by many small villages and acts as marketplace for people.

== Demographics ==
As of 2001 India census, Sayalgudi had a population of 12,049. Males constitute 50% of the population and females 50%. Sayalgudi has an average literacy rate of 68%, higher than the national average of 59.5%; male literacy is 77%, and female literacy is 59%. 12% of the population is under 6 years of age.
