= Paramakudi =

Paramakudi Parambai
- Town
- Location of Paramakudi in Tamil Nadu
- Coordinates: 9.549400°N 78.589100°E
- Country: India
- State: Tamil Nadu
- District: Ramanathapuram
- Established: Since 1918
- Named for: Face of Vaigai River

Government
  - Type: First Grade Municipality
  - Body: Paramakudi Municipality

Area
  - Total: 13.45 km^{2} (5.19 sq mi)
  - Rank: 2nd in Ramanathapuram District/
- Elevation: 68 m (223 ft)

Population (2011)
  - Total: 95,579
  - Rank: 1st in Ramanathapuram District
  - Density: 16,448/km^{2} (42,600/sq mi)

Languages
  - Official: Tamil
- Time zone: UTC+5:30 (IST)
- PIN: 623701-623707
- Telephone code: 04564
- Vehicle registration: TN-65
- Website: www.tnurbantree.tn.gov.in/paramakudi/

Paramakudi or Paramakkudi is the largest town in the district of Ramanathapuram in Tamil Nadu, India, with a population of over 133,000 as of 2024. It has been the taluk headquarters since the formation of Ramanathapuram District in 1918.

Paramakudi consists of two separate settlements: Paramakudi and Emaneswaram. These settlements were classified as different towns in the census records from 1901 to 1961 before merging into the municipal present city in 1964.

The area of the town is 13.45 km^{2}. There are 36 members on the council. The Vaigai River flows through Paramakudi to the Bay of Bengal.

Paramakudi also serves as sub-district for Ramanathapuram and some of the governmental services divided between Ramananthapuram and Paramakudi to serve people better such as for the southern part of the district it serves as the Regional Transport Office (RTO) for vehicle registration and other activities.

It is also famous market place for all the villages around and many people residing in nearby villages come to the town to complete their major shopping and purchases.

== History ==
Paramakudi was ruled by the Pandyan dynasty and later by Sethupathi of Ramanathapuram. According to the ancient epic Ramayana, Rama started his battle against Ravana at Sethu Canal.

== Demographics ==
According to the 2011 census, Paramakudi had a population of 95,579 with a sex ratio of 966 females for every 1,000 males. 9,292 were under the age of six, constituting 4,800 males and 4,492 females. Scheduled Castes and Scheduled Tribes accounted for 14.5% and 0.08% of the population respectively. The average literacy of the town was 81.44%, compared to the national average of 72.99%. The town had 23,504 households. There were 35,561 workers, comprising 825 cultivators, 881 main agricultural laborers, 6,682 in household industries, 23,453 other workers, 3,720 marginal workers, 113 marginal cultivators, 209 marginal agricultural laborers, 496 marginal workers in household industries and 2,902 other marginal workers.

According to the religious census of 2011, Paramakudi had 86.55% Hindus, 9.2% Muslims, 4.11% Christians, 0.01% Sikhs and 0.12% following other religions.

== Notable people ==
- Kamal Haasan
- Vikram
- Vinod Raj
- Charuhasan
- Chandrahasan
- Chinmayi Sripada
