= Mudukulathur =

- Municipality
- Location in Tamil Nadu, India
- Coordinates: 9.338233°N 78.508301°E
- Country: India
- State: Tamil Nadu
- District: Ramanathapuram

Government
  - Type: Town panchayat
  - Body: Mudukulathur panchayat

Area
  - Total: 8 km^{2} (3.1 sq mi)
- Elevation: 70 m (230 ft)

Population (2011)
  - Total: 14,789
  - Density: 1,800/km^{2} (4,800/sq mi)
- Demonym: Tamils

Languages
  - Official: Tamil
- Time zone: UTC+5:30 (IST)
- PIN: 623704
- Telephone code: 4576
- Vehicle registration: TN 65

Mudukulathur is a Town panchayat in the Ramanathapuram district of the Indian state of Tamil Nadu

== Demography ==
As of 2001 India census, Mudukulathur had a population of 13,130 with males and females each constituting 50% of the population. The town had an average literacy rate of 70%, higher than the national average of 59.5%. Male literacy was 76%, while female literacy was 65%. 12% of the population was under 6 years of age.

Historically, the town was called Mutthukulathur, meaning "the town with pearls in its lakes" in Tamil, referring to the three ponds, "oorani". Over time, the name of the town changed to Mudhukulathur meaning "town of oldest ponds," ironically referencing the absence of pearls and the drying up of the ponds.

== Economy ==
The local economy produces rice, chilli, cotton and seasonal vegetables. It is largely dependent on remittances from the Gulf, government salaries, agriculture, labour and trade. Agriculture remains the major economic activity.

== Governance ==
Mudukulathur is a part of the Mudukulathur state assembly constituency. In 2021, R.S.Rajakannappan from Dravida Munnetra Kazhagam was elected.

== Infrastructure ==
=== Water-Road-Power ===
Water have been scarce in this town for many decades and the local administration supplies drinking water to homes daily for few hours in the morning, primarily used for drinking and cooking. During the summer season, supply of water is reduced to 2–4 days in a week and some residents purchase water from local vendors.

This town has a well-developed road network connecting it to nearby towns and villages, but only the road to Paramakkudi is of notable quality

Most homes are connected to the state electricity network, TNEB.

=== Transport ===
Transport is primarily by Road using public transport services operated by state transport corporation and private players like Jayavilas and Shanmugam Bus Transport companies. In the recent years, people use taxis and autos for local commute. A newly constructed bus stand, which has statues of leaders of two communities reflecting the social arrangement of present times, serves the commuters.

=== Health ===
As a taluk headquarters, Mudukulathur has a government hospital and several private clinics including Parvin clinic, run by a long-servinglady doctor.

== Education ==
=== Government And Government Aided Educational Institutions ===
SCHOOL	SINCE	AFFILIATION	GROUPS/BRANCH	EXTRA CURRICULAR	MANAGEMENT
TELC High School		Govt. of TN: BOARD OF SCHOOL EDUCATION			Govt Aided - private Management
Panchayat Elementary School		Govt. of TN: BOARD OF SCHOOL EDUCATION			Government of Tamil Nadu
Pallivasal Higher Secondary School	1927	Govt. of TN: BOARD OF SCHOOL EDUCATION			Govt Aided - private Management
Government Higher Secondary School	High School-1953; Higher Secondary School-1978.	Govt. of TN: BOARD OF SCHOOL EDUCATION	Groups: 1.MPC-Comp.Sci; 2.hggMPC-Bio; 3.Economics -Comp.Sci; 4.Economics -History; 5.Vocational -Account & Auditing; 6.Vocational -General Machinist	Activities : 1.NCC; 2.NSS; 3.JRC; 4.Scouts & Guides; 5.National Green Corps; 6. Consumer club.	Government of Tamil Nadu
Higher Education
Govt Arts & Science college		Karikudi Alagappa University	B.A; B.Sc		Government
Technical Education
Government ITI	1975				Government

=== Self-Financing Educational Institutions ===
SCHOOL	SINCE	AFFILIATION	GROUPS/BRANCH	EXTRA CURRICULAR	MANAGEMENT
Kamaraj Matriculation School		Matric syllabus			Private Management
Kanna Matriculation School		Matric syllabus			Private Management
Higher Education
Sonaimeenal Arts & Science college		Karikudi Alagappa University			Private Management
Technical Education
Rahmaniya ITI	2000				Private Management
