= Ramanathapuram district =

- District of Tamil Nadu
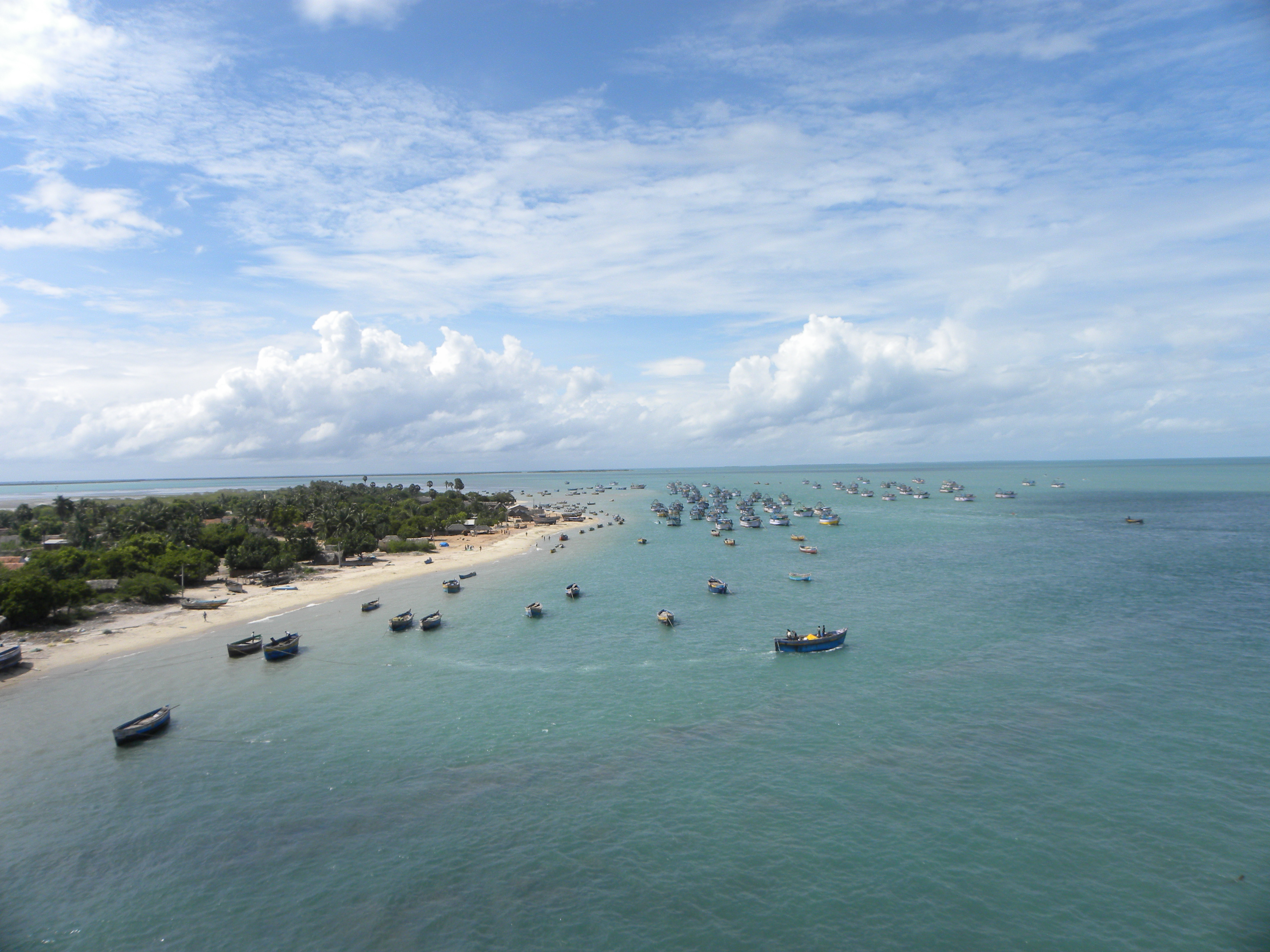
- Aerial view of the Rameswaram island from Pamban Bridge in Tamil Nadu, India
- Nickname: Mugavai
- Ramanathapuram district Location in Tamil Nadu
- Coordinates: 9°23′N 78°45′E
- Country: India
- State: Tamil Nadu
- Municipalities: Ramanathapuram; Paramakudi; Rameswaram; Kilakarai
- 'Largest City By Population': Paramakudi
- 'Largest City by Area': Ramanathapuram
- Town Panchayats: Rajasingamangalam; Kamuthi; Mudukulathur; Abiramam; Thondi; Sayalgudi
- Named for: Rama
- Headquarters: Ramanathapuram
- Taluka: Kadaladi; Kamuthi; Kilakarai; Mudukulathur; Paramakudi; R.S.Mangalam; Ramanathapuram; Rameswaram; Tiruvadanai

Government
  - Collector: Johny Tom Varghese, IAS IAS
  - Superintendent of Police: G.Chandeesh IPS

Population (2011)
  - Total: 1,353,445
- Demonym: Ramnadians

Languages
  - Official: Tamil
- Time zone: UTC+5:30 (IST)
- PIN: 623xxx
- Telephone code: 04567
- Vehicle registration: TN-65
- Central location: 9°16′N 77°26′E
- Website: ramanathapuram.nic.in

Ramanathapuram district, also known as Ramnad district, is one of the 38 administrative districts of Tamil Nadu state in southern India. The old Ramanathapuram District consists of present-day Virudhunagar and Sivagangai districts, it touches the Western Ghats and bordered with the state of Kerala and east by Bay of Bengal. It was the largest district on that time. The town of Ramanathapuram is the district headquarters. Ramanthapuram District has an area of 4,123 km^{2}. It is bounded on the north by Sivaganga District, on the northeast by Pudukkottai District, on the east by the Palk Strait, on the south by the Gulf of Mannar, on the west by Thoothukudi District, and on the northwest by Virudhunagar District. The district contains the Pamban Bridge, an east–west chain of low islands and shallow reefs that extend between India and the island nation of Sri Lanka, and separate the Palk Strait from the Gulf of Mannar. The Palk Strait is navigable only by shallow-draft vessels. As of 2011, Ramanathapuram district had a population of 1,353,445 with a sex-ratio of 983 females for every 1,000 males. The district is home to the pilgrimage centre of Rameswaram and tourist spot Dhanushkodi, an abandoned town.

== History ==
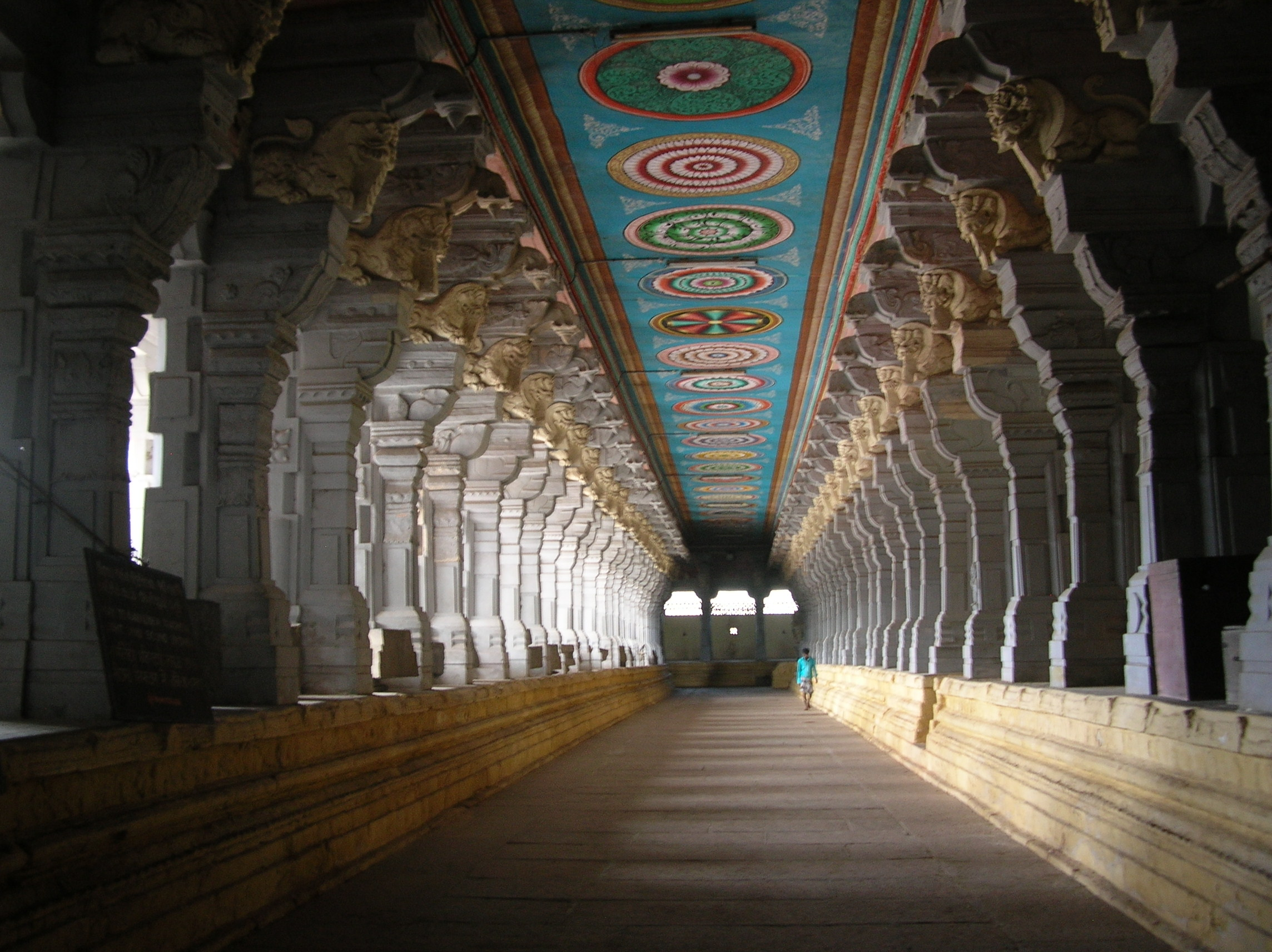
Corridors of the Rameshwaram temple.

In the early 15th century, the present territories of Ramanathapuram district, comprising taluks Tiruvadanai, RajaSingaMangalam, Paramakudi, Ramanathapuram and Rameswaram, Kamuthi, Mudukulathur in Pandyan Dynasty. For a short period, this area was under the Kings when Rajendra Chola I brought it under his territory in 1063 CE. In 1520, the Nayaks of Vijayangar took over the area under their control from the Pandiyan dynasty for about two centuries, maravar chieftains Sethupathis who were Lords under Pandiyan Kings and reigned over this part (17th century). At the beginning of the 18th century, family disputes over succession resulted in the division of Ramanathapuram. With the help of the King of Thanjavur in 1730, one of the chieftains deposed Sethupathy and became the Raja of Sivaganga. Acting upon the weakness of the Nayak rules, the local chieftains (Palayakarars) became independent. Raja of Sivagangai and Sethupathy of Ramanathapuram were prominent among them. In 1730, Chanda Sahib of Carnatic, captured Ramanathapuram. In 1741, the area came under the control of the Marattas and then under the Nizam in 1744, Nawab's rule made displeasure in the mind of those chieftains. That made them declare the last Nayak as ruler of Pandiya Mandalam against the Nawab in 1752. By that time, throne of Carnatic had two rivals, Chanda Sahib and Mohamed Ali, and this district was part of Carnatic. The British and French supported Chanda Sahib and Mohamed Ali respectively. It paved the way for series of conflicts in the southern part of the continent.

In 1795, the British deposed Muthuramalinga Sethupathy and took control of the administration of Ramanathapuram. In 1801 Mangaleswari Nachiyar was made the Zamindar of Sivagangai. After the passing of Queen, the Marudhu Brothers took the charge by paying regular revenue to the East India company. In 1803 the Marudhu Brothers of Sivaganga revolted against the British in collaboration with Kattabomman of Panchalamkurichi. Colonel Agnew captured Marudhu Brothers and hanged them and made Gowri Vallbah Periya Udaya Thevar as Zamindar of Sivaganga. After the fall of Tippu Sultan, British took the control and imprisoned the Nawab. In 1892, the Zamindari system was abolished and a British Collector was appointed for administration.

In 1910, Ramanathapuram was formed by clubbing portions from Madurai and Tirunelveli district. Shri J.F. Bryant I.C.S was the first collector. And this district was named as Ramanathapuram. During the British period this district was called "Ramnad." The name continued after independence. Later the district was renamed as Ramanathapuram to be in conformity with the Tamil name for this region.

== Geology ==
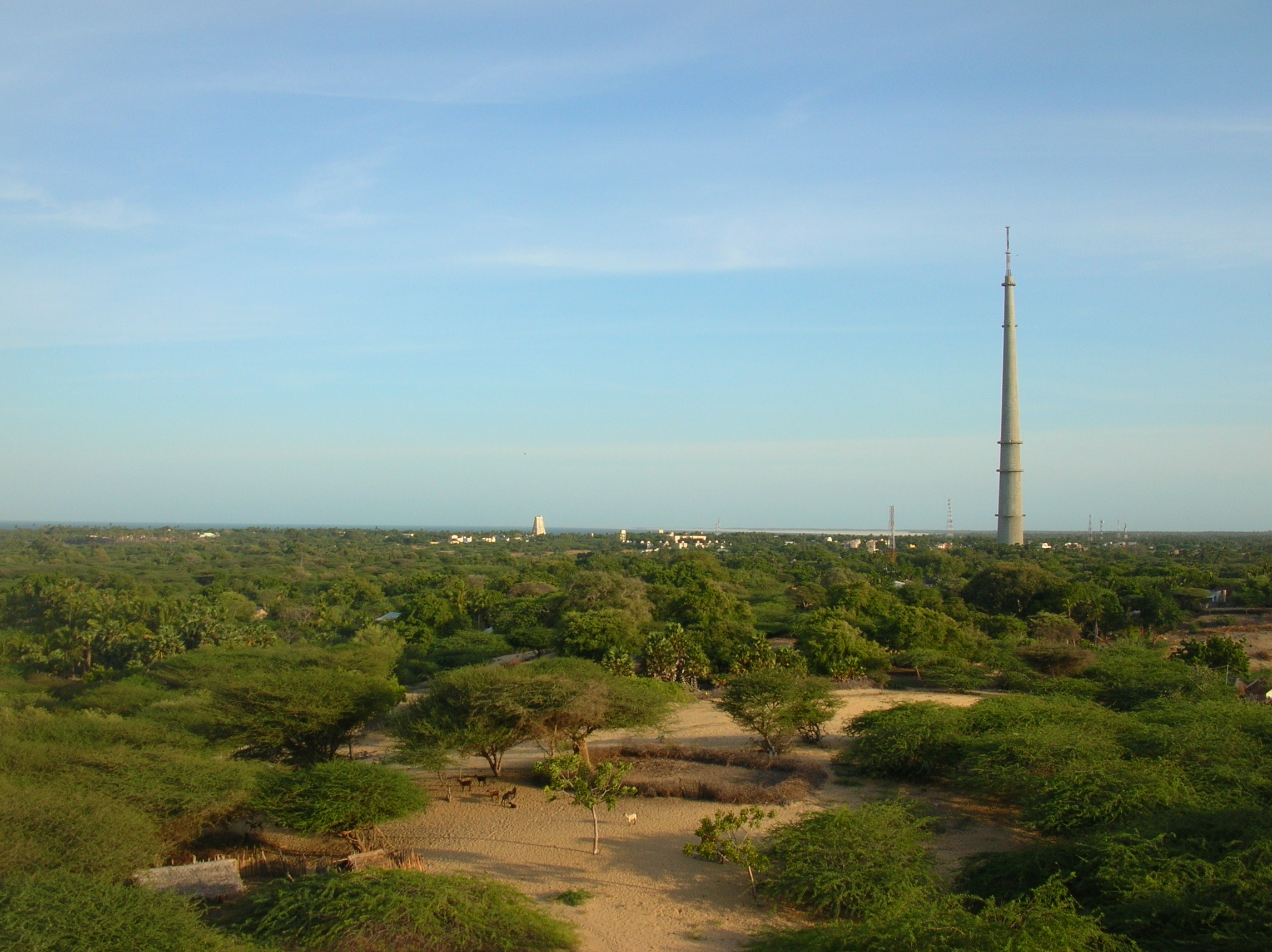
Pamban Island in which Rameswaram is located

Most of the area is covered by the unconsolidated sediments of the Quaternary age except in the northwestern part, where isolated patches of Archaean crystallines and Tertiary sandstone are exposed. The Archaeans are mainly represented by the Charnockite group of rocks comprising garnetiferous granulite and the Khondalite group of rocks made up of quartzite and gneisses.

The Tertiary sandstone (Cuddalore Formation) comprises pinkish, yellowish, reddish (variegated colours) medium to coarse grained sandstone and clay stone. It is overlain by thin alluvium and exposed towards the north of the Vaigai River.

Detached exposures of laterite and lateritic soil are seen in the northwestern part of the district.

A major part of the district is covered with the fluvial, fluvio-marine, Aeolian and marine sediments of Quaternary age. The fluvial deposits which are made up of sand, silt and clay in varying degree of admixture occur along the active channels of Vaigai, Gundar, Manimuthar and Pambar rivers. They have been categorised into levee, flood basin, channel bar/ point bar and paleo-channel deposits. The paleo-channel deposits comprise brown-coloured, fine to medium sands with well preserved cross-beddings.

The fluvio-marine deposits are exposed in the Vaigai delta as deltaic plain, paleo-tidal and dune flat deposits. The deltaic plain and dune flats comprise medium, grey brown sands. The paleo tidal flat deposits include black silty clay, black clay and mud. In Rameswaram Island, the fluvio-marine deposits include indurated sand and dune sands.

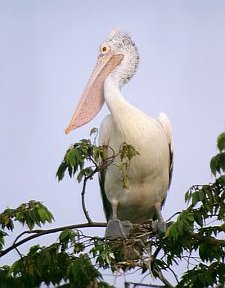
Chitrangudi Bird Sanctuary spot-billed pelican

The Aeolian deposits comprise red sands which are in nature of ancient dunes and occur over a 3.2 km wide and 8 km long stretch and lie parallel to the sea coast. These are separated by marshy deposits of black clays. The sands are underlain by calcareous hardpan. In Rameswaram Island also brown sand deposits occur around Sambaimadam on either side of NH 49 west of the town.

The marine formation comprises coastal plain deposits of sand and clay in varied proportions. Marine calcareous hardpan occurs as low terraces and platforms, with admixture of quartz, limonite and garnet concentration.

== Demographics ==
Historical population
Year	Pop.	±% p.a.
1901	442,067	—
1911	477,726	+0.78%
1921	479,202	+0.03%
1931	517,471	+0.77%
1941	577,826	+1.11%
1951	551,125	−0.47%
1961	702,168	+2.45%
1971	822,623	+1.60%
1981	998,295	+1.95%
1991	1,119,153	+1.15%
2001	1,187,604	+0.60%
2011	1,353,445	+1.32%

Religions in Ramanathpuram district (2011)
Religion	Percent
Hinduism	77.39%
Islam	15.37%
Christianity	6.73%
Other or not stated	0.51%

According to 2011 census, Ramanathapuram district had a population of 1,353,445 with a sex-ratio of 983 females for every 1,000 males, much above the national average of 929. A total of 140,644 were under the age of six, constituting 71,705 males and 68,939 females. Scheduled Castes and Scheduled Tribes accounted for 18.40% and 0.08% of the population, respectively. The average literacy of the district was 72.33%, compared to the national average of 72.99%. The district had a total of 323,905 households. There were a total of 602,977 workers, comprising 149,959 cultivators, 103,592 main agricultural labourers, 18,546 in house hold industries, 214,053 other workers, 116,827 marginal workers, 23,808 marginal cultivators, 50,282 marginal agricultural labourers, 6,682 marginal workers in household industries and 36,055 other marginal workers.

Languages of Ramanathapuram district (2011)
1. Tamil (97.7%)
2. Saurashtra (1.53%)
3. Others (0.80%)

At the time of the 2011 census, 97.67% of the population spoke Tamil and 1.53% Saurashtra as their first language.

== Tourist attractions ==
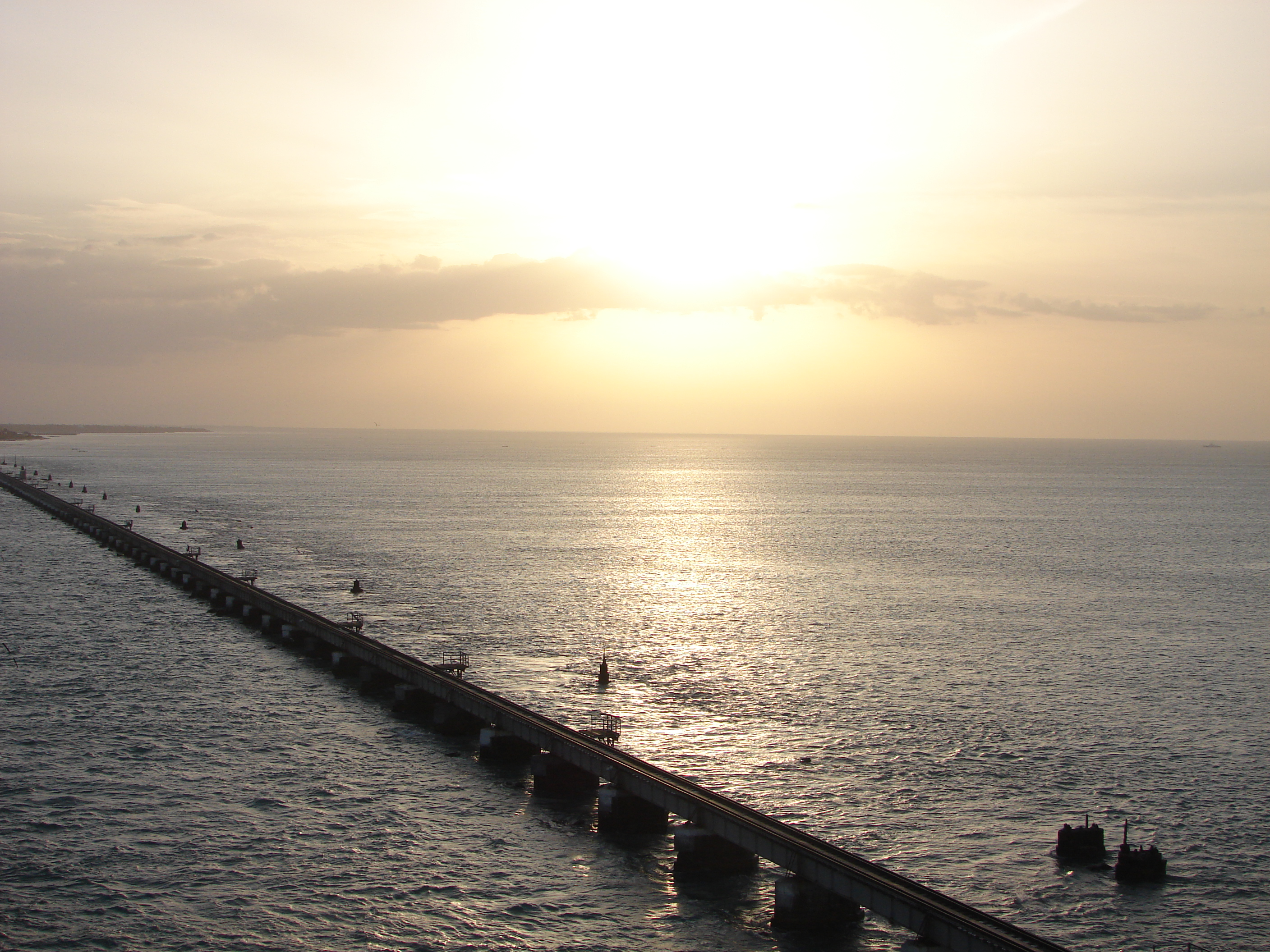
Pamban Bridge between Pamban Island and the mainland

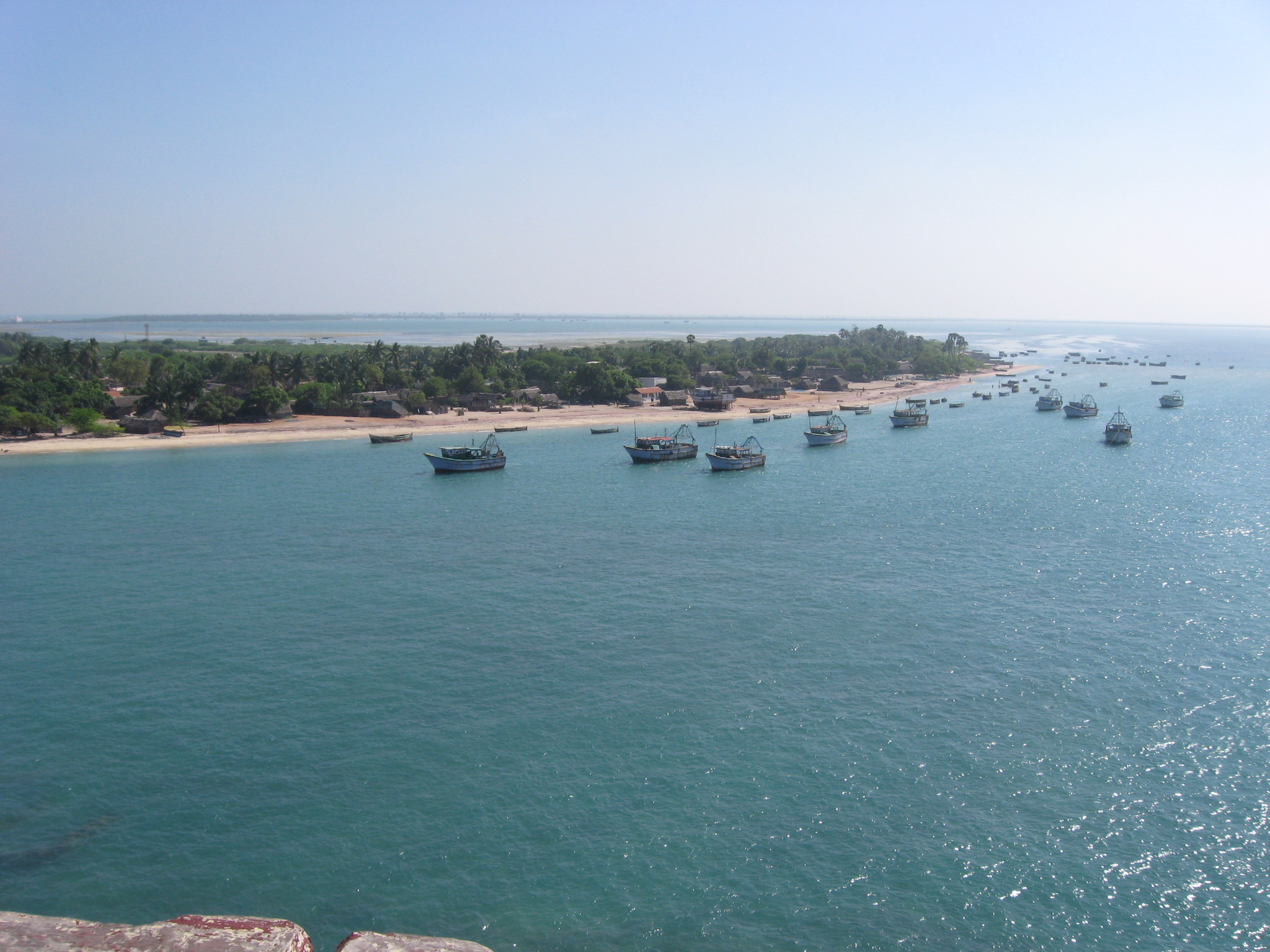
Fishing boats seen from Pamban Bridge

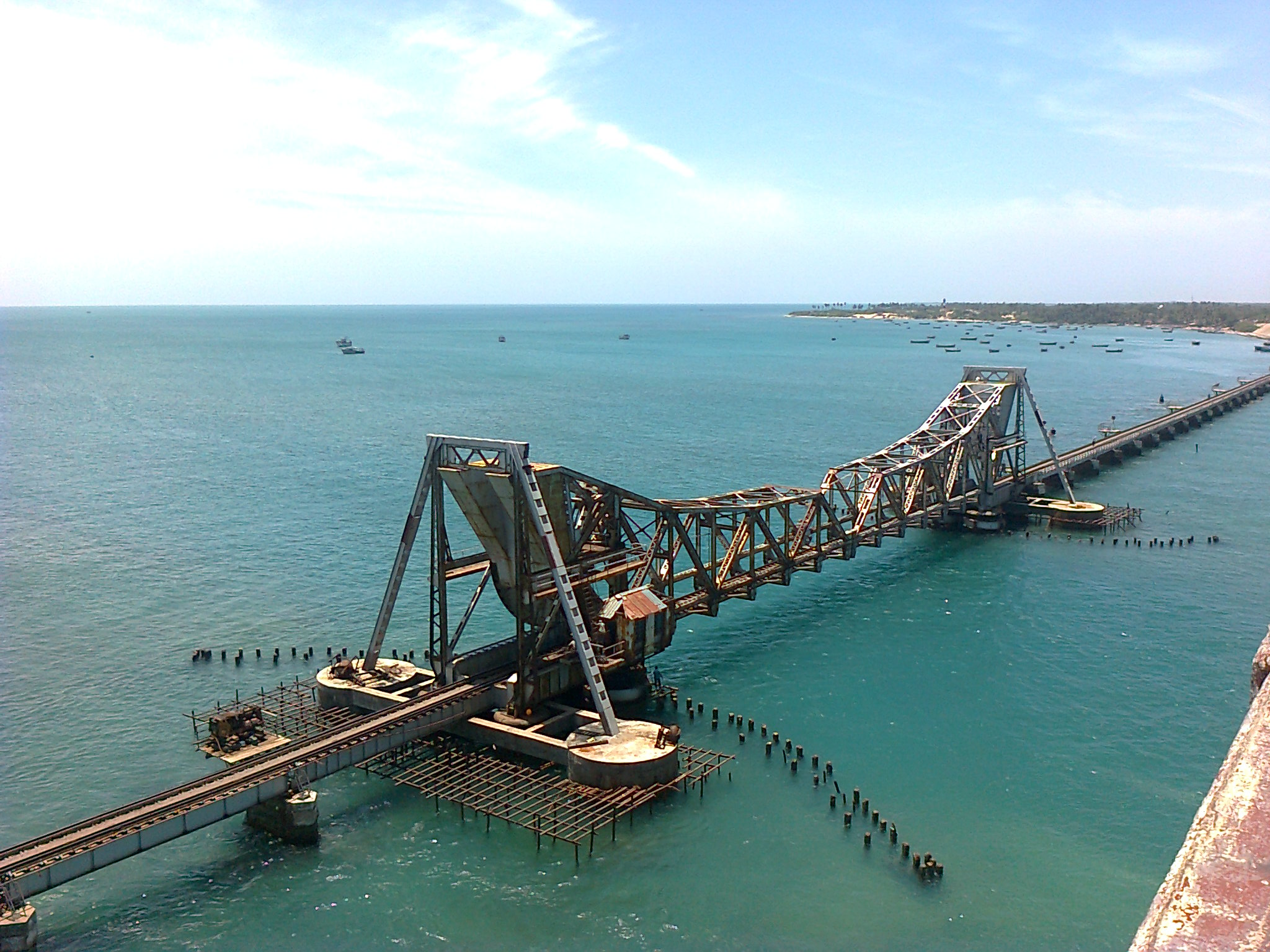
Pamban rail bridge connecting Pamban island with the Indian mainland

- Ramanathapuram (Palace - This palace was built during the reign of Kizhavan Sethupathi (1674–1710 CE) the most popular among the Sethupathi kings.)
- Rameswaram is a holy place known to Hindus as a centre of pilgrimage for Shiva and Rama (Ramanathaswamy Temple)
- Thangachimadam – grave of A. P. J. Abdul Kalam, near Peikarumbu
- Dhanushkodi
- Pamban Bridge
- Kundhukal - Vivekananda Memorial
- R S Madai (Sea World Aquarium)
- Paramakudi
- Pasumpon
- Kamuthi (Pasumpon Dever Memorial)
- Kanjirankulam Bird Sanctuary
- Chitrangudi Bird Sanctuary
- Alagankulam Bird Sanctuary
- Melselvanur-Keelselvanur Bird Sanctuary
- Uthirakosamangai (3000 years old Shiva Temple, priceless Green emerald Stone Nadarajar statue).
- Thiruvettriyur (Paagam Priyal Koil)
- Irumeni village - sweet water wells (theertha), silver beach and karaivalai fish
- Periyapattinam India's First Port away from Sea)
- Panaikkulam, Puthuvalasai, attrangarai, Valoor (Beach)

== Gulf of Mannar Marine Biosphere Reserve ==
Marine Biosphere Reserve not only in India but also in south and southeast Asia. The IUCN Commission on National Parks and WWF, identified the Reserve as being an area of "Particulars concern" given its diversity and special multiple-use management status. In addition, as the first marine biosphere reserve declared in India, this area has long been a national priority.

The Gulf of Mannar and its 3,600 species of flora and fauna is one of the biologically richest coastal regions in all of the mainland of India.

It is equally rich in sea-algae, sea grasses, coral reef pearl banks, fin and shellfish resources, mangroves, and endemic and endangered species. It is an important habitat for the highly endangered sea mammal, the dugong commonly called the sea cow.

There are 137 species of coral found in Gulf of Mannar. The coral come in myriads of shapes. Some have finger like branches and others dome-shaped colony with a net work of ridges and furrows.

Sponges, although at casual glance look like plants, are animals, living singly or in colonies of many individuals. Their colours vary as much as shape, being green, red, yellow, and even black or white. In the crevices, these sponges are found with many animals, ranging from tiny crabs and brittle star to bivalve molluscs. 275 species under 8 orders are found in Gulf of Mannar.

== Economy ==
With a 34 percentage share, Paramakudi is the top chili pepper producer in Tamil Nadu. In 2018, Government of India classifies Ramanathapuram as one of the 112 most underdeveloped district across the country and brought it under Aspirational Districts Phase 1.

== Politics ==
District	No.	Constituency	Name	Party	Alliance	Remarks
Ramanathapuram	209	Paramakudi (SC)	K. K. Kathiravan	DMK	SPA	
Ramanathapuram	210	Tiruvadanai	Rajeev	TVK	TVK+	Cabinet Minister
Ramanathapuram	211	Ramanathapuram	Katharbatcha Muthuramalingam	DMK	SPA	
Ramanathapuram	212	Mudhukulathur	R. S. Rajakannappan	DMK	SPA	

== Notability ==
The Ramnathapuram Mundu chilli is a variety of dry red chilli mainly grown in this district. It is primarily grown in the Ramanathapuram district's Tiruvadanai, Mudukulathur, Kadaladi, RS Mangalam and Kamuthi taluks.

=== Geographical indication ===
It was awarded the Geographical Indication (GI) status tag from the Geographical Indications Registry under the Union Government of India on 22 February 2022 (valid until 15 November 2030).

Ramnad Mundu Chilli Producer Company Limited from Mudhukulathur, proposed the GI registration of Ramnathapuram Mundu chilli. After filing the application in November 2020, the chilli was granted the GI tag in 2023 by the Geographical Indication Registry in Chennai, making the name "Ramnathapuram Mundu chilli" exclusive to the chilies grown in the region. It thus became the first chilli variety from Tamil Nadu and the 45th type of goods from Tamil Nadu to earn the GI tag.

== See also ==
- Upputanni Island
- List of districts of Tamil Nadu
