= Theriruveli =

- Village
- Location in Tamil Nadu, India Theriruveli (India)
- Coordinates: 9.3°N 78.70°E
- Country: India
- State: Tamil Nadu
- District: Ramanathapuram district

Government
  - Member of legislative assembly: R.S.RAJAKANNAPPAN (DMK)
  - Panchayat president: Sit kakkaa
  - panchayat counselor: gothandam

Languages
  - Official: Tamil
- Time zone: UTC+5:30 (IST)
- PIN: 623 711
- Telephone code: 04576
- Vehicle registration: TN-65

Theriruveli is a village in the Ramanathapuram district of Tamil Nadu state in southern India. It is located near uthrakosamangai and belongs to the Mudukulathur Legislative Constituency. The economy is largely based on agriculture and sheep raising, and remittances from residents who have travelled abroad.

== Administration ==
Theriruveli village is represented by the Mudukulathur assembly constituency which is part of Ramanathapuram (Lok Sabha constituency). Since its formation, the constituency has been represented in the assembly by members of Indian National Congress (INC), Forward Bloc, Dravida Munnetra Kazhagam (DMK) and All India Anna Dravida Munnetra Kazhagam (AIADMK) parties.

The High Court Bench started functioning in 2004 with the jurisdiction of the Districts including Ramanathapuram.

The nearest passport office is in Madurai, which serves the districts of Madurai, Theni, Sivaganga, Virudhunagar, Ramanathapuram, Thoothukudi, Tirunelveli, Kanyakumari & Dindugul.

Locally, Theriruveli has a panchayat (village council) which oversees the nearby villages of Anikurunthan, Chinnakaiayakam, Elankakkur, Keelapatcheri, Melapatcheri, Periakaiyakam and Vadakkutheru; as well as Theriruveli itself.

=== List of Assembly Representatives ===
| Name | Party | Term(s) |
|---|---|---|
| Thiru. Pasumpon Muthuramalinga Thevar | Forward Bloc | more than 10 years |
| Thiru. So. Balakrishnan Yadav B.A., BL | INC | more than 13 Years; 1977–80; 1991–2001 |
| Thiru. K. Pathinettampadian M.A M.L.A | AIADMK | 2001–2006 |
| K. Murugavel B.A., MLA. | DMK | 2006–2011 |
| M. Murugan B.A., MLA. | AIADMK | 2011–2016 |
| S.Malaysia Pandian Yadav B.A., MLA | INC | 2016–2021 |

R.S. Rajakannappan BSC, BL. DMK 2021-

=== Members of Parliament ===
| Year | Winning Candidate | Party |
|---|---|---|
| 1951 | V. VR. N. AR. Nagappa Chettiar | INC |
| 1957 | P. Subbiah Ambalam | INC |
| 1962 | N. Arunachalam | INC |
| 1967 | M. Sheriff | Independent |
| 1971 | P.K. Mookiah Thevar | Forward Bloc |
| 1977 | P. Anbalagan | AIADMK |
| 1980 | M. S. K. Sathiyendran | DMK |
| 1984 | V. Rajeshwaran | INC |
| 1989 | V. Rajeshwaran | INC |
| 1991 | V. Rajeshwaran | INC |
| 1996 | S. P. Udayappan | Tamil Maanila Congress (Moopanar) |
| 1998 | V. Sathiamoorthy | AIADMK |
| 1999 | K. Malaisamy | AIADMK |

== Culture ==
=== Excavation at Theriruveli ===
The Tamil Nadu Archaeology Department conducted an excavation at a site called 'Colony Thidal' in Theriruveli, under the supervision of A. Abdul Majeed. Nadu worked on this project with the assistance of N. Marxia Gandhi, R. Selvaraj, S. Santhalingam, and C. Chandravanan.

This excavation consisted of six trenches, each measuring five by four metres (16 by 13 ft). The excavation revealed shreds of many types of wares, including, but not limited to, Northern Black Polished Ware, coarse-red ware, blank ware, black-and-red ware, grey ware, Rouletted ware, and russet-coated ware. Six inscribed shreds with Brahmi script were also recovered. The personal names Korran, Sattan, and Nedunkilli, appear on the shreds. Objects including lids, hopscotch, spouts, terracotta ring-stands, iron pieces, terracotta lamps, shell bangles, sawed conches, and carnelian beads, were also recovered.

== Notable places ==
- Thiru Uthirakosamangai is an ancient temple 18 km (11 mi) from Theriruveli.
- Sri Bhama Rukmani sametha Sri Krishnar temple is located at yadava st theriruveli.
- Mudukulathur is 13 km (8.1 mi) from Theriruveli.
- The Ervadi dargah of Qutb Al Hamid Gausul Majid Hazrat Sultan Syed Ibrahim Shaheed Badusha Nayagam is 20 km (12 mi) from Theriruveli.

== Transportation ==
This village is located in the center of its district, with frequent public state and private bus routes to Ramanathapuram, Muthukulathur, Kamuthi, Aruppukottai, Viruthunagar, Rajapalayam, Paramakudi, Sikkal, and Keelakarai. In recent years, people have used taxis and private cars for local commuting.

The Ramanathapuram–Muthukulathur Road and Sikkal–Paramakudi Road intersect at Theriruveli, which is colloquially called "Mukku Road".
