= Pudumadam =

Pudumadam புதுமடம்
- Village
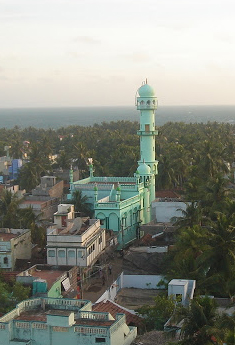
- Middle Street Masjid

- Location in Tamil Nadu, India Pudumadam (India)
- Coordinates: 9.27702°N 78.993845°E
- Country: India
- State: Tamil Nadu
- District: Ramanathapuram
- Taluk: Ramanathapuram
- Block: Mandapam

Government
  - Type: Gram panchayat
  - Body: Pudumadam Gram Panchayat

Area
  - Total: 7.83 km^{2} (3.02 sq mi)

Population (2011)
  - Total: 8,760
  - Density: 1,120/km^{2} (2,900/sq mi)

Languages
  - Official: Tamil
- Time zone: UTC+05:30 (IST)
- PIN: 623524
- Telephone code: 04567
- Vehicle registration: TN 65
- Lok Sabha constituency: Ramanathapuram
- Assembly constituency: Ramanathapuram

Pudumadam is a village in Ramanathapuram district in the Indian state of Tamil Nadu. It is located in the Ramanathapuram taluk and is identified as village code 642143 in the 2011 Census of India. The village had a population of 8,760 in the 2011 census, living in 1,834 households.

Pudumadam is a coastal settlement in the Ramanathapuram region, situated near the Gulf of Mannar. The village is also known for the presence of the Madurai Kamaraj University Department of Marine and Coastal Studies field research facility. The university established its Centre for Marine and Coastal Studies at Pudumadam in 1998, and the centre was subsequently elevated to the Department of Marine and Coastal Studies in 2009.

== Etymology ==
The name Pudumadam (Tamil: புதுமடம்) is generally explained as referring to a newly established māṭam (மடம்), a religious or charitable institution traditionally associated with accommodation and hospitality for travellers. According to a historical account of the Sethupathi rulers, a Pudumadam chathiram was established at Pudumadam in 1710 during the reign of Raghunatha Kilavan Sethupathi.

The Ramanathapuram Archaeological Research Foundation has reported that the historic māṭam at Pudumadam was built by Kilavan Sethupathi in 1710 and that the village came to be known as Pudumadam because the māṭam was newly constructed. The surviving structure has been described as an important historical monument associated with the history of the Sethupathi rulers and the village.

Thus, the name Pudumadam can be understood literally as “new māṭam” or “new monastery/charitable rest house”, although the historical sources specifically associate the name with the newly constructed institution rather than providing a formal linguistic derivation.

== History ==
=== Sethupathi period ===
Pudumadam formed part of the historical Ramanathapuram region ruled by the Sethupathi dynasty. Documentary evidence records the existence of a chathiram (charitable rest house) at Pudumadam during the reign of Raghunatha Kilavan Sethupathi. Sethupathi Mannar Varalaru, a historical work on the Sethupathi rulers, lists the Pudumadam Chathiram and dates it to 1710.

According to an archaeological survey reported by the Ramanathapuram Archaeological Research Foundation, the historic madam at Pudumadam measures approximately 200 feet (61 m) in length and 100 feet (30 m) in width and contains a verandah, accommodation areas and an inner courtyard. The organisation attributes the construction of the structure to Kilavan Sethupathi in 1710 and reports that Pudumadam village was granted for the support of the institution.

The chathiram was intended to provide accommodation and rest for travellers and people moving through the coastal region. Such charitable institutions were established at several locations in the Ramanathapuram region during the Sethupathi period.

=== Development of the settlement ===
Historical records indicate that Pudumadam continued to be associated with the Ramanathapuram estate after the period of Kilavan Sethupathi. A history of the Sethupathi rulers records a connection between the Ramanathapuram royal family and Pudumadam in the nineteenth century. In 1847, Rani Parvatha Vardhani Nachiyar is recorded as having adopted Muthu Ramalingam, whose family had connections with Pudumadam.

Over time, Pudumadam developed into a distinct coastal village. It is today recognised as a separate revenue village; the 2011 Census of India assigns Pudumadam the village code 642143.

=== Migration and settlement ===
The present population of Pudumadam reflects the long-term development of the coastal settlement. However, detailed accounts concerning the origins and migration of individual communities into the village have not been established in readily available published historical or academic sources. Further documentary evidence is required to reconstruct the settlement history of Pudumadam reliably.

== Geography ==
=== Location ===
Pudumadam is a coastal village in Ramanathapuram district in the Indian state of Tamil Nadu. It is situated in Ramanathapuram taluk and is part of the Mandapam block. The 2011 Census of India identifies Pudumadam as village code 642143.

The village has a geographical area of approximately 783 hectares. It is located on the southeastern coast of Ramanathapuram district, near the coastal settlements of the Mandapam area.

=== Coastline ===
Pudumadam has a coastline on the Gulf of Mannar. The Tamil Nadu government's database on the Gulf of Mannar records a wave-cut platform along the Pudumadam coast, where hard sandstone occupies parts of the intertidal zone.

Sea cliffs are also documented along parts of the Gulf of Mannar coast, including the coastal area around Pudumadam. The cliffs are generally composed of calcareous sandstone and occur near the high-water level.

=== Gulf of Mannar ===
Pudumadam is situated on the Gulf of Mannar, a body of water in the Indian Ocean between southeastern India and Sri Lanka. The Gulf of Mannar region contains ecologically important marine habitats, including coral reefs, mangroves, seaweed beds and seagrass ecosystems.

Pudumadam is also the location of the Marine Field Research Facility of Madurai Kamaraj University's Department of Marine and Coastal Studies. The university states that the facility is located close to the marine habitats of the Gulf of Mannar and is used for marine research and academic programmes.

=== Nearby towns and villages ===
The 2011 Census identifies several villages in the surrounding area, including Pirappanvalasai, Sattakkonvalasai, Mandapam, Nochiyurani and Karan.

Mandapam is a nearby coastal settlement, while Uchippuli is another nearby settlement. Ramanathapuram is the district headquarters to the west, and Rameswaram is located farther to the east.

== Demographics ==
=== 2011 Census ===
According to the 2011 Census of India, Pudumadam had a population of 8,760 living in 1,834 households. The population consisted of 4,454 males and 4,306 females. Children aged 0–6 numbered 994, comprising approximately 11.35% of the total population.

The Census identifies Pudumadam as village code 642143 in Ramanathapuram taluk of Ramanathapuram district. It is recorded as a village within the Ramanathapuram Community Development Block.

=== Population ===
Pudumadam had a population of 8,760 in 2011, of whom 4,454 were male and 4,306 were female. The 1,834 households had an average population of approximately 4.8 persons per household. The population aged 0–6 consisted of 505 boys and 489 girls.

=== Sex ratio ===
The sex ratio of Pudumadam was 967 females per 1,000 males in the 2011 Census. Among children aged 0–6, the child sex ratio was approximately 968 girls per 1,000 boys.

=== Literacy ===
In 2011, Pudumadam had 6,948 literate residents among the population aged seven years and above. The literacy rate was 89.47%. Male literacy was 93.82%, while female literacy was 84.96%.

=== Languages ===
Tamil is the principal language of the area. The 2011 Census language tables provide mother-tongue data for Tamil Nadu at the state, district and subdistrict levels, but do not provide a separate village-level mother-tongue distribution for Pudumadam.

== Economy ==
=== Fishing ===
Fishing has historically been an important economic activity in Pudumadam, reflecting the village's location on the Gulf of Mannar. The village has a dedicated Pudumadam Fishermen Cooperative Society, which is listed by the Tamil Nadu State Cooperative Societies Election Commission among the fishermen's cooperative societies in the state.

Fishing is also an important component of the wider economy of Ramanathapuram district. Research by the Central Marine Fisheries Research Institute has identified Ramanathapuram as an important marine-fishing district in Tamil Nadu in terms of marine fish landings and fishing activities. The district supports motorised, non-mechanised and other forms of marine fishing.

The Tamil Nadu Fisheries Department operates fisheries cooperative societies as an institutional mechanism for supporting fishing communities and implementing welfare measures for fishermen and fisherwomen.

=== Overseas employment ===
Overseas employment is reported as an important source of income for some families in Pudumadam, particularly through employment in the Gulf region. However, reliable village-level statistical data quantifying overseas employment or remittances for Pudumadam has not been identified in the published sources consulted for this article.

The Ramanathapuram District Employment and Career Guidance Centre provides guidance relating to overseas employment as part of its employment and career services.

=== Local businesses ===
Pudumadam has a range of small-scale commercial activities serving the local population. These include retail shops, food-related businesses, service establishments and other household and community-oriented enterprises. Detailed official statistics on the number and economic contribution of businesses in Pudumadam are not readily available.

=== Traditional occupations ===
Fishing is the best-documented traditional occupation associated with Pudumadam. Other forms of employment have developed alongside the traditional coastal economy, including trade, services, construction and employment outside the village. However, detailed historical evidence establishing the relative importance of individual traditional occupations in Pudumadam is limited.

The wider Ramanathapuram coastal region also supports other marine-related livelihoods, including seaweed cultivation and fish marketing. Studies by the Central Marine Fisheries Research Institute have identified fishing and seaweed farming as important occupations in Ramanathapuram district.

== Education ==
=== Government Higher Secondary School ===
Government Higher Secondary School, Pudumadam is a government co-educational school serving students from classes VI to XII. The school is located in Pudumadam and is administered by the Tamil Nadu School Education Department. It is identified by UDISE code 33271104602.

The school was established in 1964 and provides secondary and higher secondary education. It is listed among the Government Higher Secondary Schools in the Ramanathapuram educational district by the Tamil Nadu Teachers Recruitment Board.

=== Other educational institutions ===
Pudumadam also has government schools providing elementary and secondary education. Tamil Nadu government records identify a Government High School (Girls), Pudumadam with UDISE code 33271104605.

Electoral records for the Ramanathapuram Assembly constituency also identify Panchayat Union Elementary Schools in Pudumadam, including schools in North Street and other parts of the village.

Pudumadam is also home to a marine research and academic facility of Madurai Kamaraj University. The university established its Centre for Marine and Coastal Studies at Pudumadam in 1998 as a marine field research facility. The centre was upgraded to the Department of Marine and Coastal Studies in 2009. The facility supports marine research and academic programmes relating to the Gulf of Mannar, including research on coral reefs, mangroves, seaweeds and seagrass ecosystems.

== Marine research ==
Pudumadam is the location of a marine field research facility operated by Madurai Kamaraj University (MKU). The facility is part of the university's Department of Marine and Coastal Studies and is located close to the marine ecosystems of the Gulf of Mannar.

=== Madurai Kamaraj University ===
Madurai Kamaraj University established the Centre for Marine and Coastal Studies (CMCS) in 1998 to develop a marine field research facility at Pudumadam. The university acquired coastal land for the centre through donation and purchase from local residents. In October 2009, the centre was upgraded to the Department of Marine and Coastal Studies (DMCS).

The Pudumadam facility is used for marine research, field studies and practical training. The university describes the facility as being close to the Gulf of Mannar's marine ecosystems, including coral reefs, mangroves, seaweed beds and seagrass ecosystems. The department also provides facilities for underwater research, including SCUBA diving and snorkeling.

=== Marine and Coastal Studies ===
Research undertaken through the department covers marine ecology, coral reef conservation, marine biodiversity, marine pollution, marine biotechnology and marine environmental science. The department's research programmes include coral reef monitoring, marine molecular taxonomy, ocean acidification, marine microbiology and marine natural-products research.

The Pudumadam facility is also used for practical training associated with the university's marine biology programmes. Students undertake field studies of marine organisms and ecosystems in the Gulf of Mannar and Palk Bay, including coral reefs, seagrass and mangrove habitats.

=== Marine ecotoxicology ===
A Marine Ecotoxicology Research Laboratory was established at Pudumadam with support from the Ministry of Earth Sciences. The facility was developed for research into the effects of pollutants on marine organisms and ecosystems and for studies supporting the development of seawater quality criteria.

The department's marine ecotoxicology research has included assessment of marine pollution, coastal water quality and the effects of pollutants on marine organisms. Research projects have also examined seawater quality criteria for coral reef ecosystems in the Gulf of Mannar and pollution along the Gulf of Mannar and Palk Bay coasts.

=== Gulf of Mannar research ===
The Pudumadam facility provides a base for research on the marine ecosystems of the Gulf of Mannar. Madurai Kamaraj University states that its researchers have conducted continuous monitoring of coral reefs and fish populations around the islands of the Gulf of Mannar and reef areas of Palk Bay. Research has included monitoring coral health, coral bleaching, coral diseases and algal growth.

The department has also undertaken research on marine pollution, marine litter, coral reef health, ocean acidification and marine ecotoxicology in the Gulf of Mannar region. The university states that the results of its ecological studies contribute to the conservation and management of coral reef ecosystems within the Gulf of Mannar Marine Biosphere Reserve.

The facility has supported field-based research using equipment including research boats, underwater cameras, remotely operated underwater vehicles and SCUBA-diving equipment. Its location near the Gulf of Mannar's coral reefs, mangroves, seaweed and seagrass habitats enables researchers and students to conduct direct field observations and sampling.

== Transport ==
=== Road ===
Pudumadam is connected to surrounding villages and towns by road. The 2011 Census Village Directory records the availability of road and transport facilities in the village, including bus services.

Pudumadam is located within the Mandapam area of Ramanathapuram district and has road connections with nearby settlements, including Mandapam, Uchippuli and other villages in the surrounding area. The road network also provides access to Ramanathapuram and Rameswaram.

=== Rail ===
Pudumadam does not have a railway station. The 2011 Census recorded the nearest railway facility in the 5–10 km distance range.

=== Uchippuli railway station ===
Uchippuli railway station (station code UCP) is the nearest railway station serving Pudumadam. It is located on the Manamadurai–Rameswaram branch line and is operated by Southern Railway. Indian Railways lists Uchippuli as a railway station in Ramanathapuram district, Tamil Nadu.

The station provides rail access towards Ramanathapuram and Rameswaram.

== Culture and heritage ==
Pudumadam's cultural life reflects its history as a coastal settlement in the Ramanathapuram region. Tamil is the principal language of the village, and religious institutions form an important part of community life.

=== Local traditions ===
Local community life is closely associated with the village's coastal environment, fishing activities and religious institutions. The village's streets and neighbourhoods include several longstanding places of worship that also serve as community gathering places.

The historical Pudumadam māṭam or chathiram, associated with the Sethupathi period, is an important part of the village's heritage. Historical sources associate the construction of the institution with Raghunatha Kilavan Sethupathi in 1710.

=== Religious institutions ===
Pudumadam contains several mosques as well as Hindu places of worship. Local directories identify mosques including Jaami'aah Masjid, Masjid-e-Noor and Masjid Rahmath, as well as Hindu temples including Muthumariamman Temple and Dharma Devathai Temple.

The mosques and temples form part of the village's religious and community landscape. However, detailed historical information about the individual institutions, including their dates of establishment and architectural history, requires additional documentary sources.

=== Festivals ===
Religious festivals form part of the wider cultural life of Pudumadam and the surrounding Ramanathapuram region. Islamic religious observances are particularly significant within the local Muslim community, while Hindu festivals are associated with the village's temples.

The wider Ramanathapuram district is also known for major religious festivals such as the Ervadi Santhanakoodu festival, which attracts visitors from different parts of Tamil Nadu and is recognised by the district administration as an event associated with religious harmony.

Specific dates, names and historical details of festivals celebrated exclusively in Pudumadam should be added only when supported by village-level sources.

== Local administration ==
=== Pudumadam Gram Panchayat ===
Pudumadam is administered as a Village Panchayat under the Panchayati Raj system. The Pudumadam Village Panchayat forms part of the Mandapam Panchayat Union in Ramanathapuram district.

Tamil Nadu Government records list Pudumadam among the village panchayats of the Mandapam Panchayat Union. The state government's Panchayat Raj records have also identified Pudumadam as a village panchayat under Mandapam.

The village panchayat is responsible for local civic administration and the provision and maintenance of village-level infrastructure and public services.

=== Block, taluk and district ===
Pudumadam is located in Mandapam Panchayat Union (Block), Ramanathapuram Taluk and Ramanathapuram district in Tamil Nadu.

Administratively, Ramanathapuram district has two revenue divisions and nine revenue taluks. Ramanathapuram Taluk is one of the five taluks under the Ramanathapuram Revenue Division. Pudumadam is one of the revenue villages within Ramanathapuram Taluk.

== Places of interest ==
=== Pudumadam chathiram ===
The Pudumadam chathiram or māṭam is a historic charitable rest house associated with the Sethupathi rulers of Ramanathapuram. Historical accounts date the establishment of the Pudumadam chathiram to 1710, during the reign of Raghunatha Kilavan Sethupathi. The institution was intended to provide accommodation and assistance to travellers.

According to the Ramanathapuram Archaeological Research Foundation, the historic structure is approximately 200 feet (61 m) long and 100 feet (30 m) wide and contains a verandah, accommodation areas and an inner courtyard. The foundation has described the building as approximately 300 years old and called for its preservation.

=== Pudumadam coast ===
Pudumadam has a coastal landscape facing the Gulf of Mannar. The coast includes sandy and rocky areas, while government documentation on the Gulf of Mannar records a wave-cut platform and sandstone formations along the Pudumadam coast.

The coastline is also associated with local fishing activity and provides access to the marine environments of the Gulf of Mannar.

=== Madurai Kamaraj University marine research facility ===
The Madurai Kamaraj University marine research facility at Pudumadam is a field research and academic centre associated with the university's Department of Marine and Coastal Studies. The university established the Centre for Marine and Coastal Studies at Pudumadam in 1998 and subsequently upgraded it to a department in 2009.

The facility is used for marine and coastal research and field training, particularly in relation to the ecosystems of the Gulf of Mannar and Palk Bay. Research includes coral reefs, seagrass, mangroves, marine biodiversity and marine pollution.

== Photo gallery ==
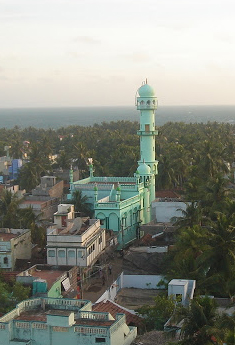
Middle Street Masjid

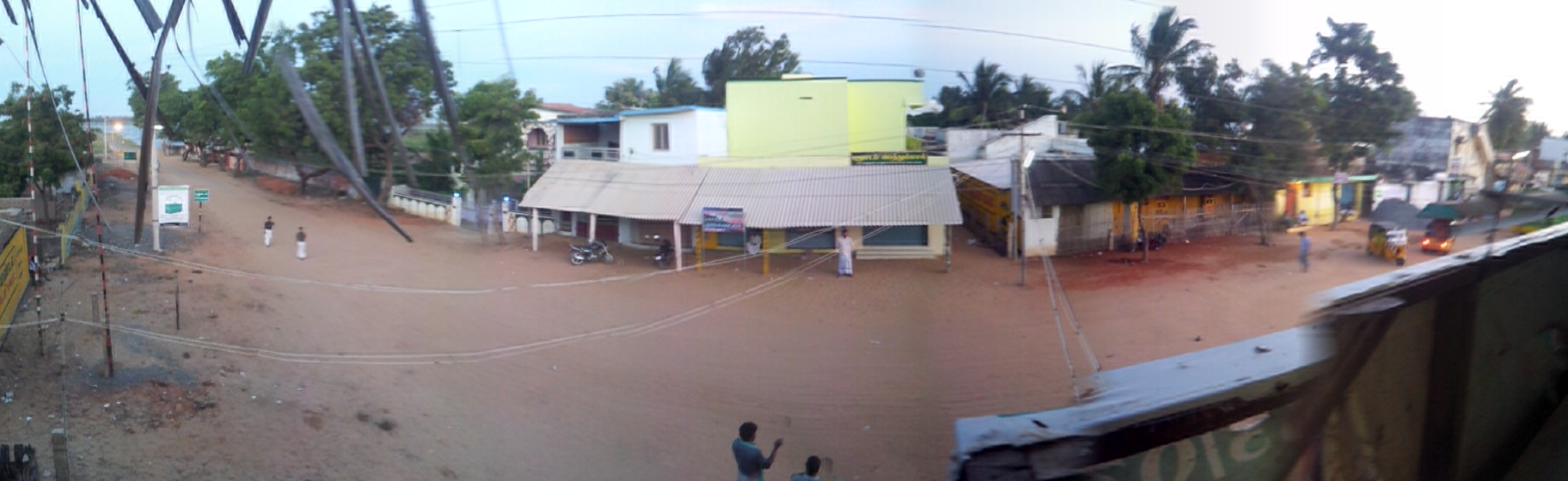
Pudumadam Bus Stand Panoramic Views

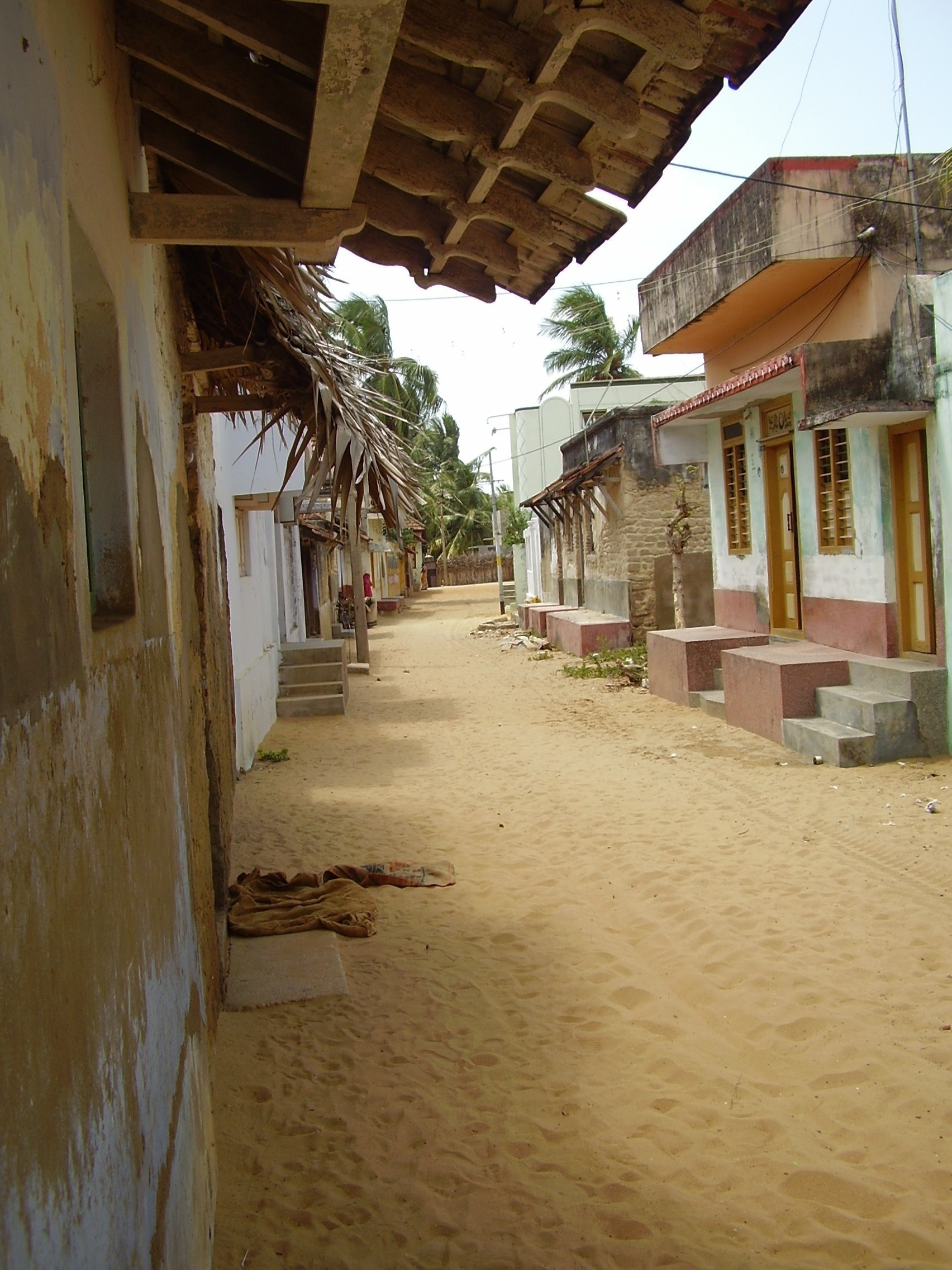
Old Street (South) of Pudumatam

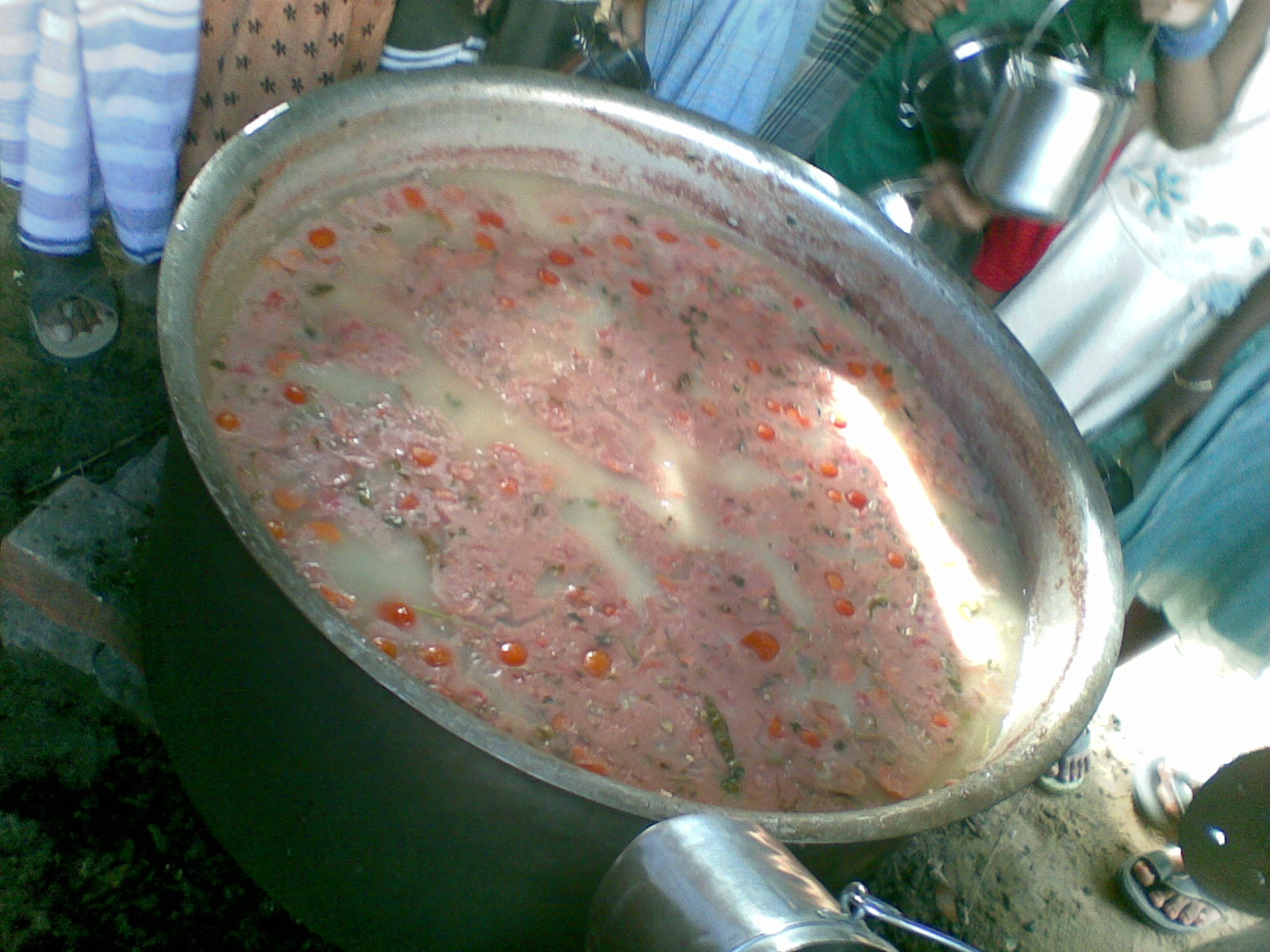
Nonbu Kanji Pot
