= Ramanathapuram Lok Sabha constituency =

Parliamentary constituency in Tamil Nadu, India

Ramanathapuram TN-65
- Lok Sabha constituency
- Interactive map of Ramanathapuram Loksabha constituency, post-2008 delimitation

Constituency details
- Country: India
- Region: South India
- State: Tamil Nadu
- Assembly constituencies: Aranthangi; Tiruchuli; Paramakudi; Tiruvadanai; Ramanathapuram; Mudhukulathur
- Established: 1952
- Total electors: 1,557,910
- Reservation: None

Member of Parliament
- 18th Lok Sabha
- Incumbent K. Navas Kani
- Party: IUML
- Alliance: INDIA
- Elected year: 2024
- Preceded by: A. Anwhar Raajhaa

Ramanathapuram Lok Sabha constituency (Tamil: இராமநாதபுரம் மக்களவைத் தொகுதி) is one of the 39 Lok Sabha (parliamentary) constituencies in Tamil Nadu, a state in southern India. The constituency is roughly coterminous with the eponymous district.

== Assembly segments ==
=== After 2008 ===
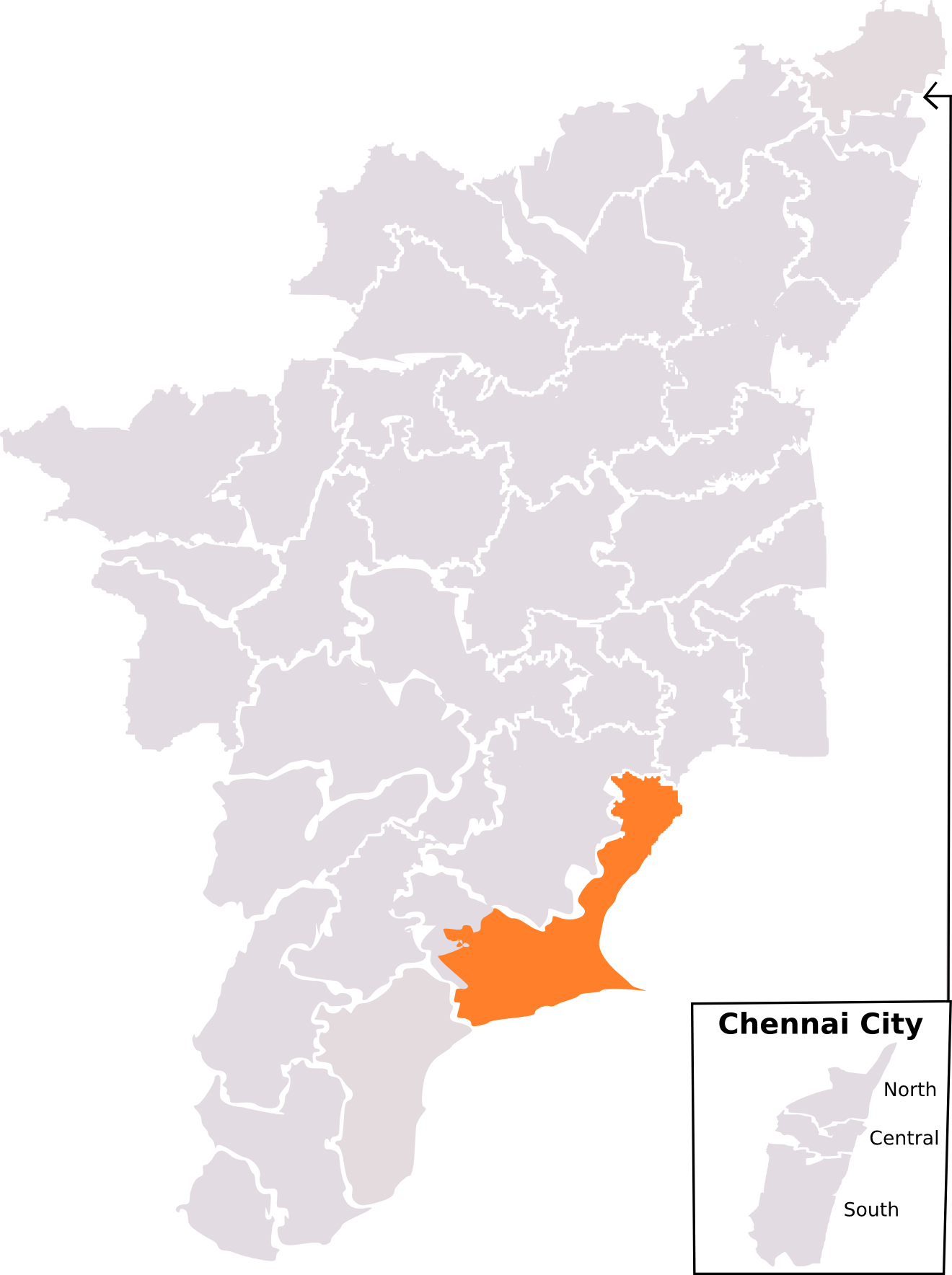
Ramanathapuram constituency as laid out by 2008 Delimitation

Ramanathapuram Lok Sabha constituency is composed of the following assembly segments:

Constituency number	Name	Reserved for (SC/ST/None)	District	Party	2024 Lead
183.	Aranthangi	None	Pudukottai	TVK	IUML
208.	Tiruchuli	None	Virudhunagar	DMK	IUML
209.	Paramakudi	SC	Ramanathapuram	DMK	IUML
210.	Tiruvadanai	None	Ramanathapuram	TVK	IUML
211.	Ramanathapuram	None	Ramanathapuram	DMK	IUML
212.	Mudukulathur	None	Ramanathapuram	DMK	IUML

=== Before 2008 ===
Ramanathapuram Lok Sabha constituency was composed of the following assembly segments:

1. Manamadurai (SC) (moved to Sivaganga)
2. Paramakudi (SC)
3. Ramanathapuram
4. Kadaladi (defunct)
5. Mudukulathur
6. Aruppukottai (moved to Virudhunagar)

== Members of Parliament ==
Year	Name	Party
1951	V. Vr. N. Ar. Nagappa Chettiar	Indian National Congress
1957	P. Subbiah Ambalam	Indian National Congress
1962	N. Arunachalam	Indian National Congress
1967	S. M. Muhammed Sheriff	Independent
1971	P.K. Mookiah Thevar	All India Forward Bloc
1977	P. Anbalagan	All India Anna Dravida Munnetra Kazhagam
1980	M. S. K. Sathiyendran	Dravida Munnetra Kazhagam
1984	V. Rajeshwaran	Indian National Congress
1989	V. Rajeshwaran	Indian National Congress
1991	V. Rajeshwaran	Indian National Congress
1996	S. P. Udayappan	Tamil Maanila Congress
1998	V. Sathiamoorthy	All India Anna Dravida Munnetra Kazhagam
1999	K. Malaisamy	All India Anna Dravida Munnetra Kazhagam
2004	M. S. K. Bhavani Rajenthiran	Dravida Munnetra Kazhagam
2009	J. K. Rithesh	Dravida Munnetra Kazhagam
2014	A. Anwhar Raajhaa	All India Anna Dravida Munnetra Kazhagam
2019	Kani K. Navas	Indian Union Muslim League
2024	Kani K. Navas	Indian Union Muslim League

== Election results ==
Vote share of Winning candidates
2024	45.92%
2019	44.29%
2014	40.81%
2009	38.03%
2004	49.72%
1999	42.15%
1998	43.83%
1996	53.02%
1991	59.25%
1989	63.57%
1984	51.09%
1980	56.66%
1977	67.62%
1971	58.16%
1967	47.23%
1962	41.14%
1957	37.61%
1951	56.36%

=== General Elections 2024 ===
2024 Indian general election: Ramanathapuram
Party	Candidate	Votes	%	±%
IUML	Kani K. Navas	509,664	45.92	▲1.63
Independent	O. Paneerselvam	342,882	30.89	New
AIADMK	P. Jeyperumal	99,780	8.99	New
NOTA	None of the above	6,295	0.57	▼0.15
BSP	N. Sivanandam	2,018	0.18	
Margin of victory		166,785	15.03	
Turnout		1,109,853	68.19	▼0.21
IUML hold		Swing		

=== General Elections 2019 ===
2019 Indian general election: Ramanathapuram
Party	Candidate	Votes	%	±%
IUML	Kani K. Navas	469,943	44.29	New
BJP	Nainar Nagendran	342,821	32.31	+15.11
Independent	V. D. N. Anandh	141,806	13.36	
MNM	Vijaya Baskar	14,925	1.41	
NOTA	None of the above	7,595	0.72	0.08
Margin of victory		127,122	11.98	−0.02
Turnout		1,061,124	68.40	−0.29
Registered electors		1,559,740		7.13
IUML gain from AIADMK		Swing	3.48	

=== General Elections 2014 ===
2014 Indian general election: Ramanathapuram
Party	Candidate	Votes	%	±%
AIADMK	A. Anwhar Raajhaa	405,945	40.81	11.79
DMK	S. Mohamed Jaleel	2,86,621	28.81	−9.22
BJP	D. Kuppu Ramu	1,71,082	17.20	0.65
INC	Su. Thirunavukkarasar	62,160	6.25	
SDPI	M. I. Noor Jiyavudeen	12,541	1.26	
CPI	R. T. Uma Mageswari	12,312	1.24	
Desiya Forward Bloc	B. T. Arasakumar	10,945	1.10	
NOTA	None of the above	6,279	0.63	
Margin of victory		1,19,324	12.00	2.98
Turnout		9,94,769	68.77	−0.10
Registered electors		14,55,988		28.46
AIADMK gain from DMK		Swing	2.77	

=== General Elections 2009 ===
2009 Indian general election: Ramanathapuram
Party	Candidate	Votes	%	±%
DMK	J. K. Rithesh	294,945	38.03	−11.68
AIADMK	V. Sathiamoorthy	2,25,030	29.02	−4.39
BJP	Su. Thirunavukkarasar	1,28,322	16.55	
DMDK	Singai. S. Jinnah	49,571	6.39	
BSP	Priscilla Pandian	39,086	5.04	4.27
MNMK	S. Saleemulla Khan	21,439	2.76	
Independent	M. I. Jahangeer	5,870	0.76	
Margin of victory		69,915	9.02	−7.29
Turnout		7,75,461	68.63	9.66
Registered electors		11,33,391		−1.25
DMK hold		Swing	-11.68	

=== General Elections 2004 ===
2004 Indian general election: Ramanathapuram
Party	Candidate	Votes	%	±%
DMK	M. S. K. Bhavani Rajenthiran	335,287	49.72	8.62
AIADMK	C. Murugesan	2,25,337	33.41	−8.74
JD(U)	S. Kannappan	79,507	11.79	
Independent	T. Veeraya	6,858	1.02	
BSP	E. Allapichai	5,223	0.77	
Independent	M. Mohideen Abdul Kader	3,314	0.49	
Margin of victory		1,09,950	16.30	15.25
Turnout		6,74,387	58.83	1.27
Registered electors		11,47,726		2.92
DMK gain from AIADMK		Swing	7.57	

=== General Elections 1999 ===
1999 Indian general election: Ramanathapuram
Party	Candidate	Votes	%	±%
AIADMK	K. Malaisamy	265,253	42.15	−1.68
DMK	M. S. K. Bhavani Rajenthiran	2,58,607	41.09	
PT	Dr. K. Nazeera Parvin	96,334	15.31	
Independent	K. O. Ramaswamy	5,494	0.87	
AIFB	R. Kalanjiam	2,707	0.43	
Margin of victory		6,646	1.06	−3.02
Turnout		6,29,308	57.49	−6.17
Registered electors		11,15,127		3.40
AIADMK hold		Swing	-10.87	

=== General Elections 1998 ===
1998 Indian general election: Ramanathapuram
Party	Candidate	Votes	%	±%
AIADMK	V. Sathiamoorthy	258,978	43.83	
TMC(M)	S. P. Udayappan	2,34,886	39.76	
PT	Dr. K. Nazeera Parvin	53,542	9.06	
INC	V. Rajeshwaran	24,942	4.22	−17.54
SP	R. Karthikeyan	17,569	2.97	
Margin of victory		24,092	4.08	−27.19
Turnout		5,90,822	56.87	−6.78
Registered electors		10,78,503		3.25
AIADMK gain from TMC(M)		Swing	-9.19	

=== General Elections 1996 ===
1996 Indian general election: Ramanathapuram
Party	Candidate	Votes	%	±%
TMC(M)	S. P. Udayappan	331,249	53.02	
INC	V. Rajeshwaran	1,35,945	21.76	−37.49
MDMK	R. Baluchamy	61,622	9.86	
Independent	P. Sundararajan	21,980	3.52	
Independent	R. Kalanjiam	21,307	3.41	
BJP	S. P. Nagarajan	16,709	2.67	
ATMK	C. Chellachami	12,113	1.94	
Independent	N. Gopal Nilayambadi	11,926	1.91	
PMK	J. Vacha Mohaideen	3,768	0.60	
Margin of victory		1,95,304	31.26	2.09
Turnout		6,24,712	63.65	4.06
Registered electors		10,44,597		1.42
TMC(M) gain from INC		Swing	-6.23	

=== General Elections 1991 ===
1991 Indian general election: Ramanathapuram
Party	Candidate	Votes	%	±%
INC	V. Rajeshwaran	348,415	59.25	−4.32
DMK	Kadher Batcha	1,76,889	30.08	−4.82
IUML	A. A. Abdul Razak	49,442	8.41	
THMM	P. Rajendran	3,140	0.53	
Independent	K. Nagaimugan	2,662	0.45	
Margin of victory		1,71,526	29.17	0.50
Turnout		5,88,029	59.59	−1.68
Registered electors		10,29,957		−0.49
INC hold		Swing	-4.32	

=== General Elections 1989 ===
1989 Indian general election: Ramanathapuram
Party	Candidate	Votes	%	±%
INC	V. Rajeshwaran	398,145	63.57	12.48
DMK	Suba Thangavelan	2,18,601	34.90	2.42
Margin of victory		1,79,544	28.67	10.06
Turnout		6,26,280	61.27	−8.89
Registered electors		10,35,028		27.71
INC hold		Swing	12.48	

=== General Elections 1984 ===
1984 Indian general election: Ramanathapuram
Party	Candidate	Votes	%	±%
INC	V. Rajeshwaran	274,922	51.09	
DMK	M. S. K. Sathyendran	1,74,778	32.48	−24.18
Independent	S. Karuppiah	57,078	10.61	
Independent	R. V. Thangavelan	16,617	3.09	
Independent	T. A. Muthuram	5,288	0.98	
Independent	I. Raman	3,856	0.72	
Independent	C. N. Asokan	2,951	0.55	
INC(J)	A. K. Zainuddin	2,592	0.48	
Margin of victory		1,00,144	18.61	1.28
Turnout		5,38,082	70.16	3.05
Registered electors		8,10,454		10.03
INC gain from DMK		Swing	-5.57	

=== General Elections 1980 ===
1980 Indian general election: Ramanathapuram
Party	Candidate	Votes	%	±%
DMK	M. S. K. Sathyendran	275,049	56.66	28.83
AIADMK	P. Anbalagan	1,90,916	39.33	−28.29
Independent	S. Balaraman	8,300	1.71	
Independent	Kalyandas Matadipathi	4,108	0.85	
Independent	G. A. Appan	3,913	0.81	
Margin of victory		84,133	17.33	−22.46
Turnout		4,85,422	67.11	2.39
Registered electors		7,36,600		6.15
DMK gain from AIADMK		Swing	-10.96	

=== General Elections 1977 ===
1977 Indian general election: Ramanathapuram
Party	Candidate	Votes	%	±%
AIADMK	P. Anbalagan	297,612	67.62	
DMK	M. S. K. Sathyendran	1,22,482	27.83	
Independent	A. Velu	17,915	4.07	
Independent	Ayerai C. Abdul Kader	2,095	0.48	
Margin of victory		1,75,130	39.79	20.49
Turnout		4,40,104	64.72	−0.45
Registered electors		6,93,920		21.72
AIADMK gain from AIFB		Swing	9.46	

=== General Elections 1971 ===
1971 Indian general election: Ramanathapuram
Party	Candidate	Votes	%	±%
AIFB	P. K. Mookiah Thevar	208,431	58.16	
INC(O)	S. Balakrishnan	1,39,276	38.87	
Independent	T. Durairaj Thevar Sadhu	10,641	2.97	
Margin of victory		69,155	19.30	10.91
Turnout		3,58,348	65.17	−9.87
Registered electors		5,70,111		8.19
AIFB gain from Independent		Swing	10.94	

=== General Elections 1967 ===
1967 Indian general election: Ramanathapuram
Party	Candidate	Votes	%	±%
Independent	M. Sheriff	180,392	47.23	
INC	S. Balakrishnan	1,48,367	38.84	−2.29
Independent	T. L. S. Thevar	39,031	10.22	
Independent	Lakshmana Subba Rajulu	10,710	2.80	
Independent	S. S. Karuppasamy	3,477	0.91	
Margin of victory		32,025	8.38	−0.35
Turnout		3,81,977	75.05	4.76
Registered electors		5,26,959		1.86
Independent gain from INC		Swing	6.09	

=== General Elections 1962 ===
1962 Indian general election: Ramanathapuram
Party	Candidate	Votes	%	±%
INC	N. Arunachalam	145,396	41.14	3.53
SWA	Salivateeswaran	1,14,513	32.40	
CPI	Mangalasamy	75,089	21.24	5.26
Independent	Raman Chetty	10,376	2.94	
Independent	R. K. Ramakrishnan	8,079	2.29	
Margin of victory		30,883	8.74	−7.63
Turnout		3,53,453	70.28	19.41
Registered electors		5,17,361		10.35
INC hold		Swing	3.53	

=== General Elections 1957 ===
1957 Indian general election: Ramanathapuram
Party	Candidate	Votes	%	±%
INC	P. Subbiah Ambalam	89,701	37.61	−18.75
Independent	R. K. Ramakrishnan	50,668	21.24	
Independent	P. Chellathurai	40,464	16.97	
CPI	R. H. Nathan	38,122	15.98	
Independent	D. L. Nagasundaram	19,547	8.20	
Independent	Singarayan	0	0.00	
Margin of victory		39,033	16.37	−17.21
Turnout		2,38,502	50.87	−2.92
Registered electors		4,68,851		30.28
INC hold		Swing	-18.75	

=== General Elections 1951 ===
1951–52 Indian general election: Ramanathapuram
Party	Candidate	Votes	%	±%
INC	V. Vr. N. Ar. Nagappa Chettiar	109,110	56.36	56.36
KMPP	T. Sundaram	44,118	22.79	
Independent	Sathiah	28,478	14.71	
Independent	Muthu	11,883	6.14%	
AIFB	Muthuramalinga	11,883	6.14%	
Margin of victory		64,992	33.57	
Turnout		1,93,589	53.79	
Registered electors		3,59,891		0.00
INC win (new seat)				

== See also ==
- Ramanathapuram
- List of constituencies of the Lok Sabha
