= Manikkaneri =

Manikkaneri மாணிக்கனேரி
- Neighbourhood
- Manikkaneri, Ramanathapuram district, Tamil Nadu
- Coordinates: 9°15′29.58″N 78°44′20.82″E
- Country: India
- State: Tamil Nadu
- District: Ramanathapuram
- Elevation: 31.62 m (103.7 ft)

Population (2011)
  - Total: 886

Languages
  - Official: Tamil, English
  - Speech: Tamil, English
- Time zone: UTC+5:30 (IST)
- PIN: 623517
- Telephone code: +914567******
- Other Neighbourhoods: Velanur, Panaiadiyenthal
- LS: Ramanathapuram
- VS: Ramanathapuram

Manikkaneri is a neighbourhood in Ramanathapuram of Tamil Nadu in India. An airport is to be planned to be constructed here. Out of two places viz., Kumbaram and Manikkaneri, Manikkaneri is finalized to be the best to suit for the construction of airport.

== Location ==
Manikkaneri is located at 31.62 m above the mean sea level with the geographic coordinates of (9°15′29.58″N 78°44′20.82″E).

Manikkaneri (Tamil Nadu)

== Population ==
As per 2011 census of India, the total human population of Manikkaneri was 886. Out of this, male constitute 452 persons and female constitute 434 persons.

== Politics ==
Manikkaneri comes under Ramanathapuram Assembly constituency and also belongs to Ramanathapuram Lok Sabha constituency.
