= Mudukulathur Assembly constituency =

State Legislative Assembly Constituency in Tamil Nadu, India

Coordinates: 9.338233°N 78.508301°E

Mudukulathur
- Constituency No. 212 for the Tamil Nadu Legislative Assembly

Constituency details
- Country: India
- Region: South India
- State: Tamil Nadu
- District: Ramanathapuram
- Lok Sabha constituency: Ramanathapuram
- Established: 1951
- Total electors: 298,958

Member of Legislative Assembly
- 17th Tamil Nadu Legislative Assembly
- Incumbent R. S. Rajakannappan
- Party: DMK
- Elected year: 2026

Mudukulathur is a legislative assembly constituency in Ramanathapuram district the Indian state of Tamil Nadu. It is a component of Ramanathapuram Lok Sabha constituency. It is one of the 234 State Legislative Assembly Constituencies in Tamil Nadu, in India.

Elections and winners in the constituency are listed below.

== Members of Legislative Assembly ==
=== Madras State ===
Year	Winner	Party
1952	U. Muthuramalinga Thevar and Mottaya Kudumbar	Forward Bloc
1957	A. Perumal and U. Muthuramalinga Thevar	Indian National Congress
1962	T. L. Sasivarna Thevar	Forward Bloc
1967	R. R. Thevar	Swatantra Party

=== Tamil Nadu ===
Year	Winner	Party
1971	Kadher Batcha alias S. Vellaichamy	Independent
1977	S. Balakrishnan	Indian National Congress
1980	K. Dhanukkodi Thevar	Forward Bloc
1984	K. Muthuvel	Forward Bloc
1989	Kadher Batcha alias S. Vellaichamy	Dravida Munnetra Kazhagam
1991	S. Balakrishnan	Indian National Congress
1996	S. Balakrishnan	Tamil Maanila Congress
2001	K. Patinetampatian	All India Anna Dravida Munnetra Kazhagam
2006	K. Murugavel	Dravida Munnetra Kazhagam
2011	M. Murugan	All India Anna Dravida Munnetra Kazhagam
2016	S. Pandi	Indian National Congress
2021	R. S. Rajakannappan	Dravida Munnetra Kazhagam
2026	R. S. Rajakannappan	Dravida Munnetra Kazhagam

== Election results ==
Vote share of winning candidates
2026	29.39%
2021	46.07%
2016	46.71%
2011	46.87%
2006	49.71%
2001	46.99%
1996	44.71%
1991	41.74%
1989	33.14%
1984	37.33%
1980	51.43%
1977	24.13%
1971	32.86%
1967	53.17%
1957	32.80%
1952	29.56%

=== 2026 ===
2026 Tamil Nadu Legislative Assembly election: Mudukulathur
Party	Candidate	Votes	%	±%
DMK	Raja Kannappan	68,003	29.39	▼16.38
TVK	B. Malarvizhi	51,405	22.22	New
AIADMK	S. Pandi	47,501	20.53	▼16.17
AIPTMMK	Dr R Ramkumar	40,422	17.47	
NTK	Chandra Prabha Jeyapal	15,112	6.53	▲1.45
NOTA	NOTA	429	0.19	
Margin of victory		16,598		
Turnout		2,31,373		
Rejected ballots				
Registered electors		297,310		
DMK hold		Swing		

=== 2021 ===
2021 Tamil Nadu Legislative Assembly election: Mudukulathur
Party	Candidate	Votes	%	±%
DMK	R.S.Rajakannappan	101,901	46.07	
AIADMK	Keerthika Muniyasamy	81,180	36.70	−3.44
AMMK	M. Murugan	19,699	8.91	
NTK	R. Rahmadnisha	11,234	5.08	4.10
MNM	C. Navapanneerselvam	943	0.43	
Independent	K. Sathish	815	0.37	
Independent	G. M. Senthilmurugan	722	0.33	
Naam Indiar Party	A. Saravanakumar	614	0.28	
Independent	S. Prabakaran	557	0.25	
BSP	N. Sivanandam	535	0.24	−0.30
NOTA	Nota	532	0.24	−0.28
Margin of victory		20,721	9.37	2.80
Turnout		221,196	71.13	2.78
Registered electors		310,954		
DMK gain from INC		Swing	-0.64	

=== 2016 ===
2016 Tamil Nadu Legislative Assembly election: Mudukulathur
Party	Candidate	Votes	%	±%
INC	S. Pandi	94,946	46.71	
AIADMK	M. Keerthika	81,598	40.14	−6.73
MDMK	P. Rajkumar	8,800	4.33	
BJP	B. T. Arasakumar	5,408	2.66	1.09
SDPI	S. Mohamed Ishak	2,103	1.03	
NTK	S. F. Mohamed Gaddaffe	1,993	0.98	
AIFB	P. Balakrishnan	1,656	0.81	
PMK	R. Irulandi	1,133	0.56	
Independent	P. Pandiyan	1,128	0.55	
BSP	S. Panchatcharam	1,100	0.54	
NOTA	None Of The Above	1,059	0.52	
Margin of victory		13,348	6.57	−4.75
Turnout		203,276	68.35	−0.70
Registered electors		297,394		
INC gain from AIADMK		Swing	-0.16	

=== 2011 ===
2011 Tamil Nadu Legislative Assembly election: Mudhukulathur
Party	Candidate	Votes	%	±%
AIADMK	M. Murugan	83,225	46.87	+7.31
DMK	V. Sathyamoorthy	63,136	35.56	−14.15
TMMK	B. John Pandian	21,701	12.22	New
BJP	K. Shanmugaraj	2,784	1.57	−0.53
JMM	T. Chandrasearan	2,308	1.30	New
Independent	R. Murugan	1,838	1.04	New
Independent	J. Sivasubramanian	1,628	0.92	New
Independent	M. Kathiresan	935	0.53	New
Margin of victory		20,089	11.31	1.17
Turnout		257,118	69.06	9.20
Registered electors		177,555		
AIADMK gain from DMK		Swing	-2.84	

=== 2006 ===
2006 Tamil Nadu Legislative Assembly election: Mudhukulathur
Party	Candidate	Votes	%	±%
DMK	K. Murugavel	51,555	49.71	New
AIADMK	S. P. Kalimuthu	41,034	39.57	−7.42
DMDK	M. Sivakumar	3,535	3.41	New
BJP	K. Shanmugaraj	2,178	2.10	New
AIFB	K. Thanikodi	1,698	1.64	New
BSP	P. Mohandass	1,399	1.35	New
Independent	R. Balan	1,037	1.00	New
Margin of victory		10,521	10.15	7.61
Turnout		103,706	59.85	0.45
Registered electors		173,271		
DMK gain from AIADMK		Swing	2.72	

=== 2001 ===
2001 Tamil Nadu Legislative Assembly election: Mudhukulathur
Party	Candidate	Votes	%	±%
AIADMK	K. Patinetampatian	49,554	46.99	New
MTD	S. Pandian	46,885	44.46	New
MDMK	S. Muniasamy	5,221	4.95	−2.98
Independent	P. Muniasamy	1,293	1.23	New
SP	I. Raman	1,276	1.21	New
JD(S)	S. Albert Valan Babu	744	0.71	New
Margin of victory		2,669	2.53	−21.54
Turnout		105,458	59.41	2.06
Registered electors		177,522		
AIADMK gain from TMC(M)		Swing	2.28	

=== 1996 ===
1996 Tamil Nadu Legislative Assembly election: Mudhukulathur
Party	Candidate	Votes	%	±%
TMC(M)	S. Balakrishnan	41,850	44.71	New
Independent	V. Bose	19,322	20.64	New
INC	R. Nagalingam	13,057	13.95	−27.79
Independent	M. Durai Raj	8,777	9.38	New
MDMK	P. Villi Thevar	7,421	7.93	New
Independent	M. Shanmugavelu	1,131	1.21	New
AIIC(T)	T. Velusamy	873	0.93	New
Margin of victory		22,528	24.07	12.56
Turnout		93,599	57.35	0.20
Registered electors		173,473		
TMC(M) gain from INC		Swing	2.97	

=== 1991 ===
1991 Tamil Nadu Legislative Assembly election: Mudhukulathur
Party	Candidate	Votes	%	±%
INC	S. Balakrishnan	40,065	41.74	+19.8
PMK	B. John Pandian	29,021	30.24	New
Thayaga Marumalarchi Kazhagam	K. Murugan	25,499	26.57	New
Independent	M. Thevar Muthumani	786	0.82	New
Margin of victory		11,044	11.51	0.31
Turnout		95,981	57.15	−2.62
Registered electors		174,823		
INC gain from DMK		Swing	8.61	

=== 1989 ===
1989 Tamil Nadu Legislative Assembly election: Mudhukulathur
Party	Candidate	Votes	%	±%
DMK	Kadher Batcha	30,787	33.14	+5.76
INC	P. K. Krishnan	20,383	21.94	New
AIADMK	K. Murugan	18,970	20.42	New
AIFB	K. Thanikodi Thevar	9,388	10.10	New
TNC(K)	T. Sathiah	4,542	4.89	New
Independent	R. Arunasalam	4,251	4.58	New
Independent	T. Veluchamy	3,006	3.24	New
Margin of victory		10,404	11.20	1.24
Turnout		92,908	59.77	−3.72
Registered electors		158,153		
DMK gain from Independent		Swing	-4.20	

=== 1984 ===
1984 Tamil Nadu Legislative Assembly election: Mudhukulathur
Party	Candidate	Votes	%	±%
Independent	K. Muthuvel	32,199	37.33	New
DMK	Kadher Batcha Alias S. Vellaichamy	23,611	27.38	New
Independent	M. Alankaram	23,385	27.11	New
Independent	A. Maruthupandian	3,438	3.99	New
INC(J)	A. Jeyaraj	1,446	1.68	New
Independent	N. Hasan Mohammed	826	0.96	New
Independent	C. M. M. Mohanmed Kasim	753	0.87	New
Margin of victory		8,588	9.96	3.29
Turnout		86,244	63.49	1.03
Registered electors		143,942		
Independent hold		Swing	-14.10	

=== 1980 ===
1980 Tamil Nadu Legislative Assembly election: Mudhukulathur
Party	Candidate	Votes	%	±%
Independent	K.THANIKKODI THEVAR	42,711	51.43	New
INC	S. Balakrishnan	37,175	44.77	+20.64
Independent	E. Raman	1,790	2.16	New
Independent	T. K. S. Madana Meera	1,117	1.35	New
Margin of victory		5,536	6.67	2.76
Turnout		83,043	62.46	2.50
Registered electors		134,626		
Independent gain from INC		Swing	27.30	

=== 1977 ===
1977 Tamil Nadu Legislative Assembly election: Mudhukulathur
Party	Candidate	Votes	%	±%
INC	S. Balakrishnan	17,709	24.13	−7.41
Independent	V. Munisamy	14,844	20.23	New
AIADMK	S. M. Karumalaiyan	14,652	19.96	New
AIFB	K. Thanukodi Thevar	12,035	16.40	New
DMK	T. Veluchamy	7,716	10.51	New
JP	A. Habeeb Mohamed	5,524	7.53	New
Independent	M. Kalimuthu	405	0.55	New
Independent	S. Alagarasamy	386	0.53	New
Margin of victory		2,865	3.90	2.58
Turnout		73,392	59.96	3.42
Registered electors		124,054		
INC gain from Independent		Swing	-8.73	

=== 1971 ===
1971 Tamil Nadu Legislative Assembly election: Mudhukulathur
Party	Candidate	Votes	%	±%
Independent	Kadher Batcha Alias Vellaichind	18,267	32.86	New
INC	R. C. Subramoniam	17,532	31.54	−3.87
AIFB	R. Rathina Thevar	17,244	31.02	New
Independent	C. Abdul Kader	2,227	4.01	New
Independent	S. Durairaj Thevar	321	0.58	New
Margin of victory		735	1.32	−16.44
Turnout		55,591	56.53	−12.86
Registered electors		104,560		
Independent gain from SWA		Swing	-20.31	

=== 1967 ===
1967 Madras Legislative Assembly election: Mudhukulathur
Party	Candidate	Votes	%	±%
SWA	R. R. Thevar	33,790	53.17	New
INC	S. A. Servai	22,500	35.40	−10.05
Independent	P. Devanesan	3,768	5.93	New
Independent	T. D. Thevar	3,495	5.50	New
Margin of victory		11,290	17.76	13.85
Turnout		63,553	69.40	6.39
Registered electors		96,817		
SWA gain from AIFB		Swing	3.81	

=== 1962 ===
1962 Madras Legislative Assembly election: Mudhukulathur
Party	Candidate	Votes	%	±%
AIFB	T. L. Sasivarna Thevar	37,162	49.36	New
INC	Kasinatha Dorai	34,217	45.45	+26.02
Independent	P. Karuppiah	3,908	5.19	New
Margin of victory		2,945	3.91	2.87
Turnout		75,287	63.01	−27.66
Registered electors		124,265		
AIFB gain from Independent		Swing	16.56	

=== 1957 ===
1957 Madras Legislative Assembly election: Mudhukulathur
Party	Candidate	Votes	%	±%
Independent	U. Muthuramalinga Thevar	55,333	32.80	New
Independent	A. Perumal	53,571	31.76	New
INC	Chinniah	32,767	19.43	+5.72
INC	A. Krishnan (Sc)	27,013	16.01	+2.31
Margin of victory		1,762	1.04	−0.03
Turnout		168,684	90.67	2.62
Registered electors		186,050		
Independent gain from AIFB		Swing	3.24	

=== 1952 ===
1952 Madras Legislative Assembly election: Mudhukulathur
Party	Candidate	Votes	%	±%
AIFB	U. Muthuramalinga Thevar	37,011	28.48	General seat
AIFB	Mottaya Kudumban	38,412	29.56	Reserved seat
INC	Sankaran	17,807	13.70	Reserved seat
INC	Shanmuga Sundaram	13,546	10.42	General seat
Independent	Muniyandi	4,967	3.82	Reserved seat
Independent	Michael	4,832	3.72	Reserved seat
KMPP	Sathiah	4,433	3.41	Reserved seat
RPI	Malaichami	3,588	2.76	Reserved seat
KMPP	Ganapathi Servai	3,471	2.67	General seat
Independent	Chandra Paul	1,880	1.45	General seat
Margin of victory		23,465 (General seat) and 20,605 (Reserved seat)	18.06 (General seat) and 15.86 (Reserved seat)	
Turnout		129,947	88.05	
Registered electors		147,582		
AIFB win (new seat)				
