= Kani K. Navas =

Indian politician

K NavasKani
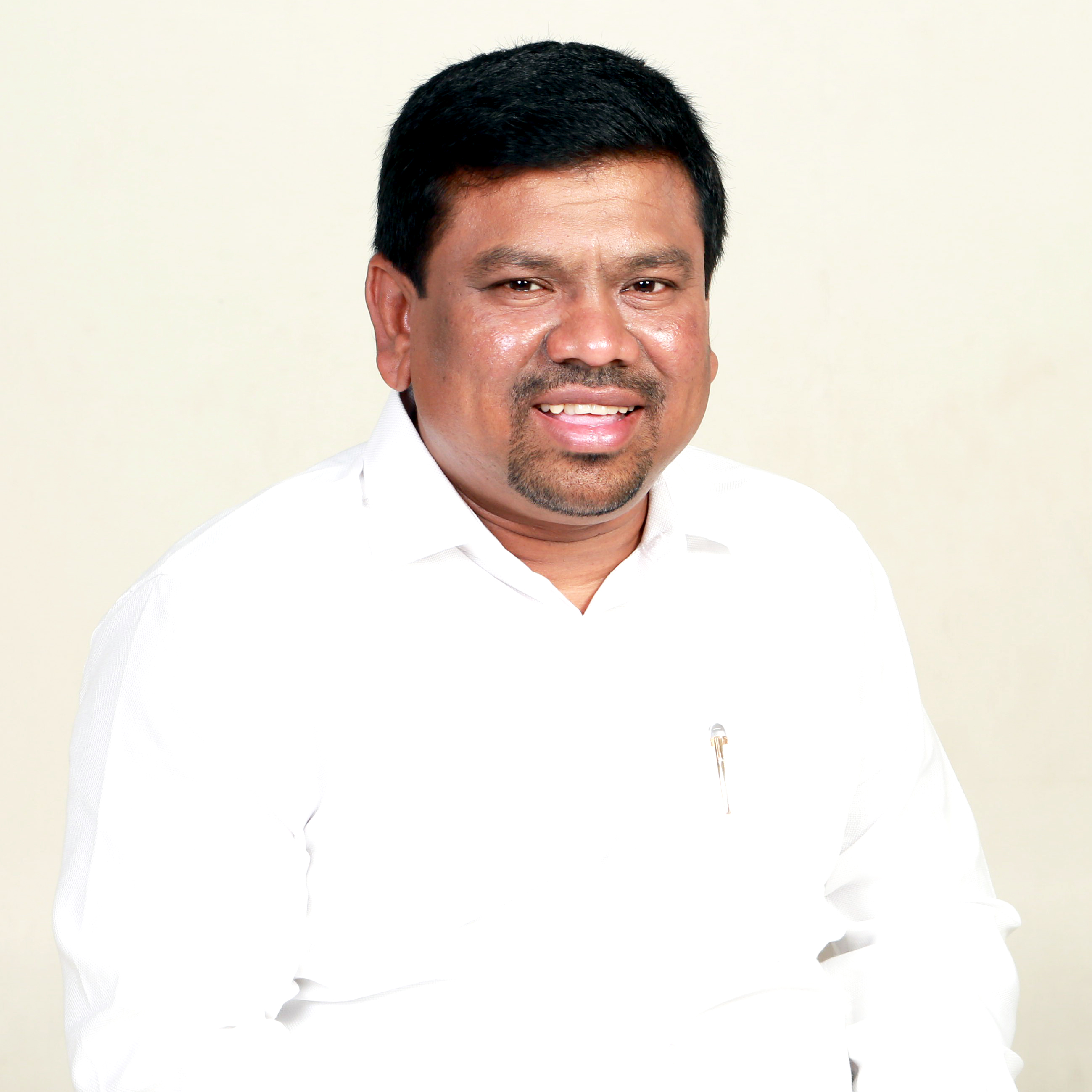
- Kani K. Navas in 2019

Chairman of Waqf Board, Tamil Nadu
- Incumbent
- Assumed office 19 September 2024
- Preceded by: Abdul Rahman

Member of Parliament, Lok Sabha
- Incumbent
- Assumed office 23 May 2019
- Preceded by: A. Anwhar Raajhaa
- Constituency: Ramanathapuram

Personal details
- Born: 14 May 1979 (age 47) Tamil Nadu, India
- Party: Indian Union Muslim League
- Spouse: Hamsathparveen
- Children: N. Afsar; N. Aqeel
- Parents: Khadarmeera Gani (father); Ramjan Beevi (mother)

Khadarmeera Navas Kani (born 14 May 1979) is an Indian politician from Indian Union Muslim League who serves as the Member of Parliament Loksabha (2019–present) from Ramanathapuram Parliamentary Constituency of the Indian state Tamil Nadu. He is a member of Standing Committee on Health and Family Welfare and Consultative Committee, Ministry of Shipping.

Navaskani was born on 14 May 1979 to Khadarmeera Gani and Ramjan Beevi at Chennai. He completed his Senior Grade School from Arupukottai. He joined the Indian Union Muslim League in 2011 and later served as the State Official Advisor. He was a member of the Standing Committee on Labour from 2019 to 2020.

Navas is one of the four Indian Union Muslim League members in the Indian Parliament (along with E. T. Mohammed Basheer, M. P. Abdussamad Samadani and P. V. Abdul Wahab). He is also first Indian Union Muslim League Member of Parliament in Loksabha from Tamil Nadu since S. M. Muhammed Sheriff (Periyakulam).

== Controversy ==
In January 2025, Kani K. Navas became the subject of controversy related to Thiruparankundram Hill, home to the Thirupparamkunram Murugan Temple, one of the Six Abodes of Murugan. The controversy arose after Navas shared a social media post depicting individuals consuming biryani near the temple's foothills. Critics, including BJP Tamil Nadu President K. Annamalai, alleged that he was encouraging sacrilegious activities by permitting non-vegetarian food near the sacred site.

Navas denied the allegations, asserting that the food consumed was vegetarian.

The situation intensified amidst ongoing tensions over incidents at the hill, including vandalism of ancient Jain caves and disputes regarding the site's management. Navas reiterated claims about the jurisdiction of the Tamil Nadu Waqf Board over portions of the hill, which others regard as significant to Hindu traditions.

== Electoral record ==
=== General Elections 2024 ===
2024 Indian general election: Ramanathapuram
Party	Candidate	Votes	%	±%
IUML	Kani K. Navas	509,664	45.92	▲1.63
Independent (NDA)	O. Paneerselvam	342,882	30.89	New
AIADMK	P. Jeyperumal	99,780	8.99	New
NTK	Jeyapal Chandraprabha	97,672	8.80	▲4.43
NOTA	None of the above	6,295	0.57	▼0.15
BSP	N. Sivanandam	2,018	0.18	
Margin of victory		166,785		
Turnout		1,109,853	68.19	▼0.21
IUML hold		Swing		

=== General Elections 2019 ===
2019 Indian general election: Ramanathapuram
Party	Candidate	Votes	%	±%
IUML	Kani K. Navas	469,943	44.29%	New
BJP	Nainar Nagendran	3,42,821	32.31%	+15.11%
Independent	V. D. N. Anandh	1,41,806	13.36%	
NTK	T. Bhuvaneswari	46,385	4.37%	
MNM	Vijaya Baskar	14,925	1.41%	
NOTA	None of the above	7,595	0.72%	0.08%
Margin of victory		1,27,122	11.98%	−0.02%
Turnout		10,61,124	68.40%	−0.29%
Registered electors		15,59,740		7.13%
IUML gain from AIADMK		Swing	3.48%	
