= Kumbaram =

Kumbaram கும்பரம்
- Neighbourhood
- Kumbaram, Ramanathapuram district, Tamil Nadu
- Coordinates: 9°18′30.42″N 78°56′10.58″E
- Country: India
- State: Tamil Nadu
- District: Ramanathapuram
- Elevation: 34.48 m (113.1 ft)

Population (2011)
  - Total: 2,114

Languages
  - Official: Tamil, English
  - Speech: Tamil, English
- Time zone: UTC+5:30 (IST)
- PIN: 623523
- Other Neighbourhoods: Perunkulam, Raghunathapuram
- LS: Ramanathapuram
- VS: Ramanathapuram

Kumbaram is a neighbourhood in Ramanathapuram district, Tamil Nadu in India. Kumbaram was proposed to be planned to construct an airport and the villagers and farmers residing in it protesting seeking the cancellation of the airport project. So the nearer village Manikkaneri is selected for the project.

The pincode of Kumbaram is 623523.

== Location ==
Kumbaram is located at an altitude of 34.48 m above the mean sea level with the geographic coordinates of (9°18′30.42″N 78°56′10.58″E).

Kumbaram (Tamil Nadu)

== Population ==
As per 2011 census of India, the total human population of Kumbaram was 2,114. Out of this, male constitutes 1,082 persons and female constitutes 1,032 persons.

== Politics ==
Kumbaram comes under Ramanathapuram Assembly constituency and also it belongs to Ramanathapuram Lok Sabha constituency.
