= M. H. Jawahirullah =

Indian politician

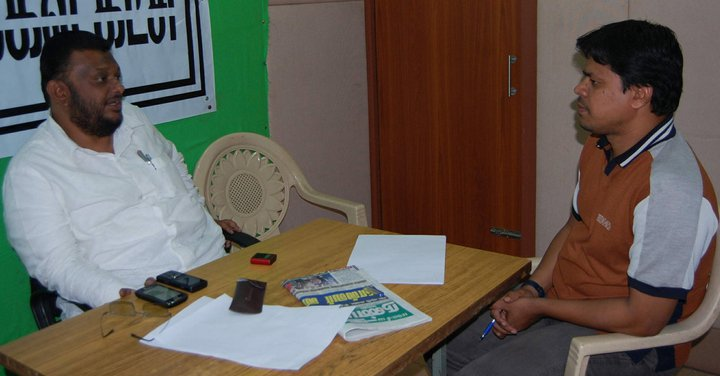
- Jawahirullah at party office

Member of Tamil Nadu Legislative Assembly
- Incumbent
- Assumed office 12 May 2026
- Preceded by: Aloor Shahnavas
- Constituency: Nagapattinam
- In office 12 May 2021 – 10 May 2026
- Preceded by: R. Doraikkannu
- Succeeded by: A. M. Shahjahan
- Constituency: Papanasam
- In office 23 May 2011 – 21 May 2016
- Preceded by: K. Hussan Ali
- Succeeded by: Dr. M. Manikandan
- Constituency: Ramanathapuram

President of Manithaneya Makkal Katchi
- Incumbent
- Assumed office 7 February 2009
- Preceded by: position established

Personal details
- Born: 22 July 1959 (age 67) Thoothukudi district
- Party: Manithaneya Makkal Katchi
- Relations: Hithayathulla (father)
- Education: Madras University, Chennai
- Profession: Professor
- Website: tmmk.in

M. H. Jawahirullah (born 1959) is an Indian politician currently elected as a member of Tamil Nadu Legislative Assembly 2021 from Papanasam Constituency and a former member of the Tamil Nadu Legislative Assembly from the Ramanathapuram constituency. He represents the Manithaneya Makkal Katchi party, of which he is a founding member and present leader. He is also a member of Tamil Nadu Muslim Munnetra Kazagham.

== Early life and education ==
Jawahirullah was born in Udangudi Thoothukudi District in Tamil Nadu. He received his bachelor's degree in commerce from the Madras University. He then obtained masters in business administration (MBA) in 1983 and Master of Philosophy in 2000. He worked as a lecturer at Islamiah College, Vaniyambadi. In 2008, he was awarded PhD by the Madras University for his dissertation on "Performance Evaluation and Assessment of Service Quality in Islamic Banks: A Study with special reference to Bank Islam Malaysia". He was a member of SIMI until 1989 and left the organisation due to its involvement in violence.

== Activism and community service ==
Jawahirullah has been actively involved in the non-violent struggle for the rights of minorities especially Muslims in India. He calls for coordination of all Muslim groups in India for positive development. His Tamil Nadu Muslim Munnetra Kazagham (TMMK) organization mobilized hundreds of volunteers to help in rescue work when a tsunami struck the coast of Tamil Nadu in 2004 and it also played an important role in 2007 during negotiations to secure reservations for Muslims in government jobs. It has been praised by a Chief Minister, M. Karunanidhi, and won an award for recruiting the highest number of blood donors in emergencies. It runs 148 free ambulances in Tamil Nadu.

Jawahirullah, representing 25 Islamic trusts, societies and charities, sought a ban on Kamal Haasan's then-unscreened movie Vishwaroopam as "it will affect social harmony" and it gave the impression that "all Muslims are terrorists". The Tamil Nadu state government banned the movie from being screened in the state for a little over a week in 2013 until a compromise was agreed.
