= List of ancient Indian cities =

This is a list of cities in the Indian subcontinent thought to have been established prior to the 8th century.

In alphabetical order

- Amaravati
- Anga (modern-day Bhagalpur)
- Ayadhya (modern-day Kanyakumari)
- Bairat (modern-day Viratnagar)
- Badayun
- Banbhore (now in Pakistan)
- Barbarikon (now in Pakistan)
- Bharuch
- Bayana
- Bhattiprolu
- Bhinmal
- Bhokardan (Bhogavardhana)
- Chandraketugarh
- Chennai
- Chunar
- Chidambaram
- Chirand
- Coimbatore
- Cuddalore
- Cuttack
- Debal (now in Pakistan)
- Dhanyakataka
- Dharmapuri
- Dwarka
- Erode
- Garthapuri (modern-day Guntur)
- Gwalior
- Hampi
- Hansi
- Harappa (now in Pakistan)
- Jabalpur
- Jaipur
- Jhansi
- Junagadh
- Kalibangan
- Kalinjar
- Kalpi
- Kalyan
- Kanchipuram
- Kannauj
- Karur
- Kaveripoompattinam
- Keezhadi
- Kodumanal
- Kollam (Quilon)
- Kotivarsha (Devkot)
- Kumbakonam
- Kumbhoj
- Kurukshetra
- Lothal
- Lashkar
- Madurai
- Meluhha (now in Pakistan)
- Mohenjo-Daro (now in Pakistan)
- Mahabalipuram
- Machilipatnam
- Mangalore (earlier Kudla (local name), Mangalapuram, Kodial, Manjara, Manjalore, Maikala, and Mangaluru)
- Mannargudi
- Mayiladuthurai
- Minnagara (now in Pakistan)
- Muziris (modern-day Kodungallur)
- Matasya Kshetra (morden-day Supaul)
- Nagapattinam
- Nalanda
- Namakkal
- Nashik
- Osian
- Patala (modern-day Thatta, now in Pakistan)
- Pataliputra
- Pistapura
- Poona (modern-day Pune)
- Purushapura (modern-day Peshawer, now in Pakistan )
- Pushkalavati (modern-day Charsadda, now in Pakistan)
- Prayag (modern-day Prayagraj)
- Pratishthana (modern-day Paithan)
- Pundravardhana
- Pudumadam புதுமடம்
- Puri
- Pushkar
- Rajagriha (modern-day Rajgir)
- Rajahmahendravaram
- Rajapura
- Ramanathapuram
- Rameshwaram
- Sagala (modern-day Sialkot, now in Pakistan)
- Salem
- Sambhar Lake Town City of Gopal Lal Jandu
- Sambalpur
- Sangrur
- Saketa (modern-day Ayodhya)
- Sirkap (now in Pakistan)
- Sirsukh (now in Pakistan)
- Sitanagaram
- Sisupalgarh (modern-day Bhubaneswar)
- Somnath
- Sopara (modern-day Nallasopara)
- Sravasti
- Tamralipta (modern-day Tamluk)
- Taxila (earlier Takshashila, now in Pakistan)
- Thanjavur (Tanjore)
- Tiruchengode
- Tiruchirappalli (earlier Uraiyur)
- Thrissivaperur (modern-day Thrissur)
- Tirunelveli
- Tiruvannamalai
- Tiruvarur
- Tuni
- Udayagiri (modern-day Bhopal)
- Ujjain (earlier Ujjayini, Avanti)
- Vadodara (earlier known with following names Viravati, Chandravati, Vadpatra and Baroda)
- Vaishali
- Vallabhi
- Varanasi
- Vijayavatika (modern-day Vijayawada)
- Vellore
- Vidisha
- Vrindavan
- Vellore
- Waltair (modern-day Visakhapatnam)
