= Murugavel =

Murugavel is a surname. Notable people with the surname include:

- K. Murugavel (fl. 2006), Indian politician
- R. M. Babu Murugavel (fl. 2011), Indian politician

== See also ==
- Murugavel Janakiraman, founder of Matrimony.com
