= Panaikulam =

- Village
- Nickname: PNK
- Location in Tamil Nadu, India
- Coordinates: 9.369762°N 78.830839°E
- Country: India
- State: Tamil Nadu
- District: Ramanathapuram
- Taluka: Ramanathapuram
- Revenue Block: Mandapam
- Village Panchayat: Panaikulam

Languages
  - Official: Tamil
- Time zone: UTC+5:30 (IST)
- PIN: 623522
- Telephone code: 91 4567
- Vehicle registration: TN 65
- Distance from Chennai: 507 kilometres (315 mi)
- Distance from Madurai: 130 kilometres (81 mi)
- Distance from Ramanathapuram: 20.8 kilometres (12.9 mi)

Panaikulam or Panaikkulam is a village located in the eastern part of Ramanathapuram district, Tamil Nadu, India. The inhabitants of this village are primarily Tamil Muslims.

There is a village with the same name Panaikulam in the state of Kerala also. It is in the district of Ernakulam in the premises Alangad village. The PIN code of this village Panaikulam is 683 511.

== History ==
The history of Panaikulam is more than 500 years old. The oral information has been collected from the old people and with the help of a will document written by one of the descendants in the family of the first migrants, it is known that Tamil-speaking Muslims migrated from adjacent parts of Ramanathapuram (e.g. Kothakottai, Udaichiyarvalasai, aalappuli) to a place with pond and lot of palm trees. They named it as Panai (meaning palm tree) kulam (meaning pond). This pond (now called as Pugaloorani) served as the water source for the people and their cattle. Slowly the migrated population moved towards the inner parts of the village and established a mosque (now Jumma Mosque) for praying.

The migrations continued from the adjacent villages of Ramanathapuram and Panaikulam became a Muslim village. Some of the migrants used handlooms to weave the cloths and made business out of it. After some time, the mosque was built up using natural stones. It is indeed a very rare architectural beauty. During the nineteenth century, opportunities present in Malaya (now called Malaysia) attracted Panaikulam people and many of them went to Malaya to earn money. They mostly settled in Penang in businesses such as money exchange and restaurants.

== Language ==
The primary language spoken by the people of Panaikulam is Tamil. Even though the accent is similar to that of the Tamil spoken in rest of Tamil Nadu, it has unique words probably borrowed from Arabic, Malay and Urdu. Certain peculiar words like nadayam (for slipper) and aanam (for curry) are used.

== Food and cuisine ==
The food habits practised by the Panaikulam people have similarities with Tamil Muslim cuisine, Sri Lankan Muslim cuisine and Malay cuisine. For example, the foods such as Watalappam and Idiyappam are regularly prepared and eaten by Sri Lankan Tamil Muslims and Tamil Muslims settled in Malaysia and Singapore.

== Notable person ==
- Haji Mastan - The birthplace of Haji Mastan is Panaikulam.
- K.A.N Bahurdeen, patriarch for the K.A.N (Kati-Adham-Naina) clan, philanthropist and founder of Bahurdeen School, first school to be established in Panaikulam for the village and its surrounding areas. Now it is run by government under the name Bahurdeen Government Higher Secondary School.
