= Katharbatcha Muthuramalingam =

Indian politician

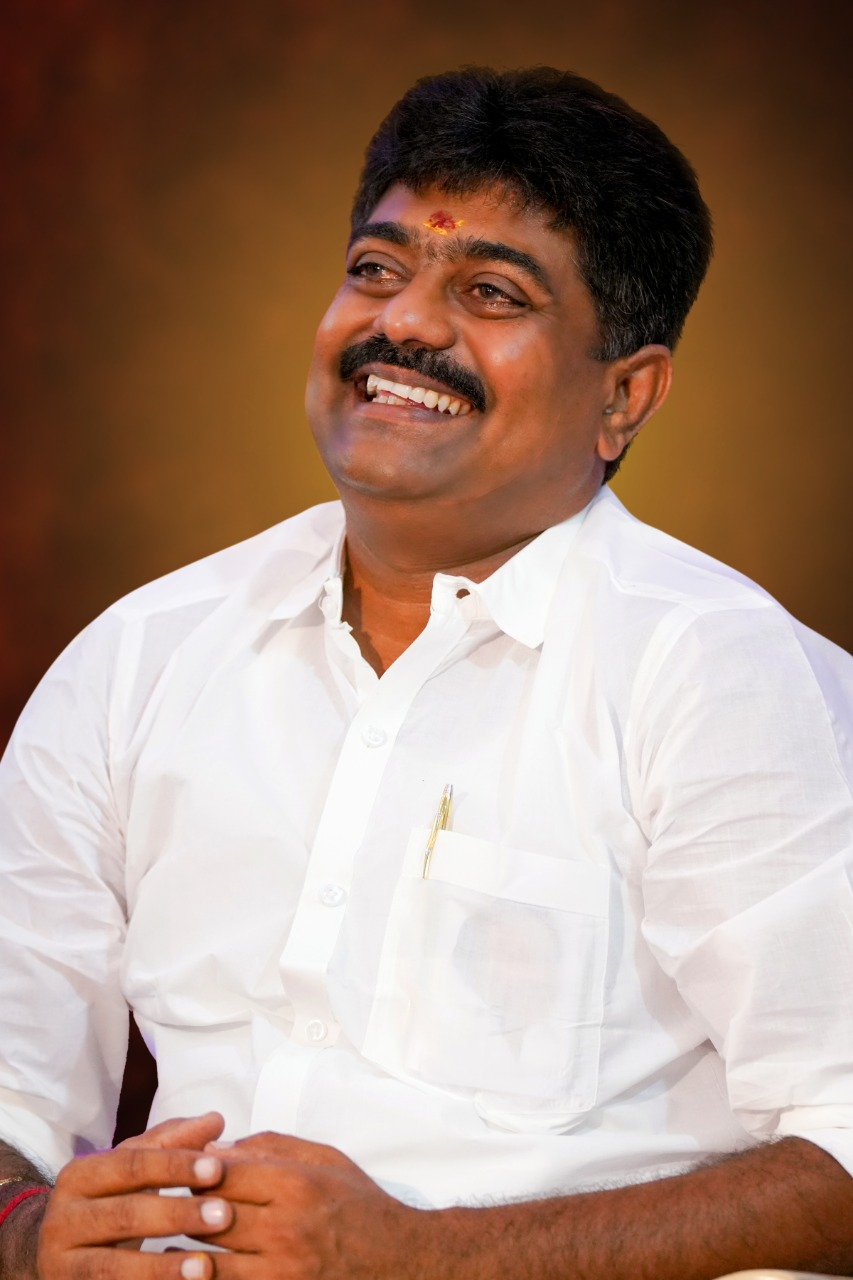

Personal details
- Born: 8 August Melaramnathi Ramanathapuram, Tamil Nadu, India
- Party: Dravida Munnetra Kazhagam
- Parent: Kadher Batcha S.Vellaichamy
- Occupation: Farmer politician

Katharbatcha Muthuramalingam is an Indian politician and member of the Tamil Nadu Legislative Assembly representing Ramanathapuram constituency. He is a member of Dravida Munnetra Kazhagam and its district secretary of Ramanathapuram district.

== Early life ==
He is the son of former Dravida Munnetra Kazhagam (DMK) MLA Thiru Kadher Batcha (S. Vellaichamy) and Rukmani Ammal.

== Political life ==
He served as Melaramanathi village Panchayat union president for 20 years from 1996 to 2016 consecutively four times.

He has been elected as a member of Tamil Nadu Legislative Assembly from Ramanathapuram (state assembly constituency) in the 2021 Tamil Nadu Legislative Assembly election with 51.88% of the vote. He is a first time member of the legislative assembly.

He is the Member of the Public Institutional Committee for the year 2021–2022.

He was appointed Non Official member of Sixth State finance commission.
