= Perumal (name) =

Perumal (Tamil: பெருமாள்) is a Tamil surname and masculine given name. Notable people with the name include:

- A. Perumal (1923–1991), Indian politician
- Azhagam Perumal (1965), Indian film director and actor
- Bagavathi Perumal (1978), Indian actor, who has worked in Tamil films
- Krishnamurthy Perumal (1943), Indian male field hockey player
- Rajes Perumal (1985–2022), Malaysian professional footballer
- Sasi Perumal (c. 1955 – 2015), Gandhian activist and anti-liquor activist from Salem, Tamil Nadu
- Wilson Raj Perumal (1965), convicted Singaporean match-fixer
