= M. Murugan =

Indian politician

M. Murugan is an Indian politician and incumbent member of the Tamil Nadu Legislative Assembly from the Mudukulathur constituency. He represents the Anna Dravida Munnetra Kazhagam party.
