= A. M. Ameeth Ibrahim =

Indian politician

A. M. Ameeth Ibrahim is an Indian politician and former Member of the Legislative Assembly of Tamil Nadu. He was elected to the Tamil Nadu legislative assembly as a Dravida Munnetra Kazhagam candidate from Kadaladi constituency in 1989 election.
