= Mottaya Kudumbar =

Indian politician

Mottaya Kudumbar was an Indian politician and former Member of the Legislative Assembly of Tamil Nadu. He was elected to the Tamil Nadu legislative assembly as a Marxist Forward Bloc candidate from Mudukulathur constituency in 1952 election. He was one of the two winners from the same constituency in that election, the other being U. Muthuramalinga Thevar. He is a member of Kudumbar clan, to which he owes much of his support to U. Muthramalinga Thevar. Bound by loyalty, the people of the Kudumbar clan uphold and support their leader in all matters.
