= A. Anwhar Raajhaa =

Indian politician

Member of Parliament, Lok Sabha
- In office 1 September 2014 – 23 May 2019
- Constituency: Ramanathapuram

Minister of Labour and Employment
- In office 2001 - 2006

Member of Legislative Assembly
- In office 2001 - 2006
- Constituency: Ramanathapuram

Chairman - Mandapam Panchayat Union (Ramanathapuram)
- In office 1986 - 2001

Chairman of Tamil Nadu Waqf Board
- In office 30 April 2018 – 25 May 2019
- Preceded by: A. Thamizhmahan Hussain
- Succeeded by: A. Mohammed John

Personal details
- Born: 29 June 1949 (age 76) Panaikulam, Ramanathapuram, Tamil Nadu
- Party: Dravida Munnetra Kazhagam (Since 2025)
- Other political affiliations: All India Anna Dravida Munnetra Kazhagam (1986-2021; 2023–25)
- Spouse: Sameera Sultan
- Occupation: Educationist
- As of 4 August, 2023

A. Anwhar Raajhaa (born 1949) is an Indian politician and served as a Member of Parliament elected from Tamil Nadu. He was elected to the 16th Lok Sabha from Ramanathapuram constituency as an Anna Dravida Munnetra Kazhagam candidate in 2014 election. Previously, he served as Minister of Labour and Employment from 2001 to 2006. From 1986 to 1991, he served as Chairman of Mandabam Panchayat Union. During his time as Parliamentarian, he served in various committees such as House Committee, External affairs, Minority affairs etc. In addition he served as the Member of Tamil Nadu Wakf Borad.

He got expelled from ADMK party on 30 November 2021 citing activities against party principles. On 4 August 2023, He joined AIADMK again in the presence of party's general secretary Edappadi palaniswami.
