= C. Ramalingam =

Indian politician

C. Ramalingam was an Indian politician and former Member of the Legislative Assembly of Tamil Nadu. He was elected to the Tamil Nadu legislative assembly as a Dravida Munnetra Kazhagam candidate from Kadaladi constituency in the 1971 election.
