= M. Thennavan =

Indian politician

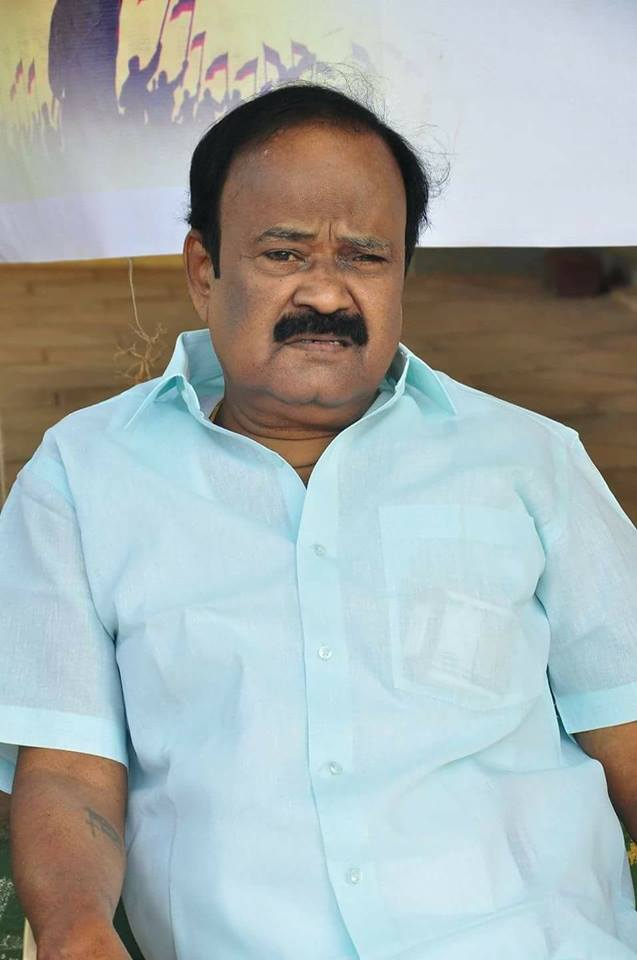
- M. Thennavan

Personal details
- Born: Muthalagu Pillai Thennavan Ramanad, Tamil Nadu, India
- Party: Dravida Munnetra Kazhagam
- Spouse: Mariyammal Thennavan
- Children: Ramajeyam; Sudha; Ilakkiya
- Parents: Muthalagu Pillai (father); Pechiyammal (mother)
- Occupation: Politician

Muthalagupillai Thennavan is an Indian politician and Former Minister and Member of the Legislative Assembly of Tamil Nadu. He was elected to the Tamil Nadu legislative assembly as an Anna Dravida Munnetra Kazhagam (Jayalalitha) candidate from Ramanathapuram constituency in 1991 election.

== Personal life ==
He was born in Kallikudi, Ramnad district. His father name is Muthalagu Pillai and his mother name is Pechiyammal. He is the only son of his family. He is now in the Dravida Munnetra Kazhagam Party and having a post of Ilakkiya Ani Thalaivar. His wife's name is Mariyammal Thennavan and he lives in Karaikkudi as of now.
