= Kadaladi Assembly constituency =

One of the 234 State Legislative Assembly Constituencies in Tamil Nadu, in India

Coordinates: 9.227392°N 78.472595°E

Kadaladi
- Former constituency for the Tamil Nadu Legislative Assembly

Constituency details
- Country: India
- Region: South India
- State: Tamil Nadu
- District: Ramanathapuram
- Established: 1967
- Abolished: 2008
- Total electors: 2,04,370
- Reservation: None

Kadaladi is a state assembly constituency in Ramanathapuram district in Tamil Nadu. It is a component of Ramanathapuram Lok Sabha constituency. It is one of the 234 State Legislative Assembly Constituencies in Tamil Nadu, in India.

== Members of the Legislative Assembly ==
Year	Winner	Party
1971	C. Ramalingam	Dravida Munnetra Kazhagam
1977	R. C. Subramanian	All India Anna Dravida Munnetra Kazhagam
1980	S. Sathiamoorthy	All India Anna Dravida Munnetra Kazhagam
1984	A. Piranavanathan	Dravida Munnetra Kazhagam
1989	A. M. Ameeth Ibrahim	Dravida Munnetra Kazhagam
1991	V. Sathiamoorthy	All India Anna Dravida Munnetra Kazhagam
1996	S. P. Thangavelan	Dravida Munnetra Kazhagam
2001	S. Balakrishnan	Tamil Maanila Congress
2006	Suba. Thangavelan	Dravida Munnetra Kazhagam

== Election results ==
Vote share of winning candidates
2006	44.88%
2001	48.10%
1996	53.23%
1991	55.65%
1989	30.36%
1984	39.81%
1980	51.41%
1977	36.56%
1971	64.86%
1967	61.50%

=== 2006 ===
2006 Tamil Nadu Legislative Assembly election: Kadaladi
Party	Candidate	Votes	%	±%
DMK	Suba. Thangavelan	53,600	44.88%	2.53%
AIADMK	V. Sathiamoorthy	46,044	38.55%	
DMDK	Singai Jinnah. S.	12,141	10.17%	
SP	Sabapathy. K.	2,149	1.80%	
BSP	Satish Kumar. P	1,343	1.12%	
AIFB	Thangaraj Pandian. D.	1,304	1.09%	
BJP	Sudalai Madan. R.	1,283	1.07%	
Independent	Naganathan. M. S	1,191	1.00%	
	Malaichamy. A.	376	0.31%	
Margin of victory		7,556	6.33%	0.57%
Turnout		119,431	58.44%	4.14%
Registered electors		204,370		
DMK gain from TMC(M)		Swing	-3.22%	

=== 2001 ===
2001 Tamil Nadu Legislative Assembly election: Kadaladi
Party	Candidate	Votes	%	±%
TMC(M)	S. Balakrishnan	51,142	48.10%	
DMK	S. P. Thangavelan	45,027	42.35%	−10.88%
Independent	Piranavanathan A	2,598	2.44%	
SP	Shiek Mohamed S. M. H.	2,002	1.88%	
MDMK	Muniyaraj. M	1,943	1.83%	−1.78%
Independent	Velusamy A	1,711	1.61%	
JD(S)	Natramil Selvan N.	666	0.63%	
JP	Ganesan K	631	0.59%	
Independent	Syed Ibrahim M	595	0.56%	
Margin of victory		6,115	5.75%	−13.22%
Turnout		106,315	54.30%	−4.91%
Registered electors		195,964		
TMC(M) gain from DMK		Swing	-5.13%	

=== 1996 ===
1996 Tamil Nadu Legislative Assembly election: Kadaladi
Party	Candidate	Votes	%	±%
DMK	S. P. Thangavelan	56,031	53.23%	26.57%
AIADMK	V. Sathiamoorthy	36,061	34.26%	−21.39%
MDMK	A. Piraanavanathan	3,795	3.61%	
Independent	P. Nagaswamy	3,532	3.36%	
PMK	V. Mahendarapallavan	2,522	2.40%	
Independent	P. Sundararajan	1,230	1.17%	
BJP	P. Murugavel	1,143	1.09%	
Independent	S. R. Shaik Dawood	283	0.27%	
Independent	S. Mohamed Abdul Kadar	185	0.18%	
Independent	S. Ganesapandy	141	0.13%	
Independent	M. Mohamedali Jinnah	140	0.13%	
Margin of victory		19,970	18.97%	−10.01%
Turnout		105,258	59.20%	4.41%
Registered electors		191,186		
DMK gain from AIADMK		Swing	-2.42%	

=== 1991 ===
1991 Tamil Nadu Legislative Assembly election: Kadaladi
Party	Candidate	Votes	%	±%
AIADMK	V. Sathiamoorthy	56,552	55.65%	30.88%
DMK	Kalimuthu K.	27,098	26.67%	−3.69%
IUML	Mohamed Mubarak Alim	17,230	16.96%	
JP	Velusamy Nadar V. A.	240	0.24%	
Independent	Mangaleswaran M. R.	187	0.18%	
THMM	Rajendran P.	178	0.18%	
Independent	Shajahan S.	134	0.13%	
Margin of victory		29,454	28.98%	28.60%
Turnout		101,619	54.79%	−9.34%
Registered electors		192,136		
AIADMK gain from DMK		Swing	25.29%	

=== 1989 ===
1989 Tamil Nadu Legislative Assembly election: Kadaladi
Party	Candidate	Votes	%	±%
DMK	A. M. Ameeth Ibrahim	32,682	30.36%	−9.45%
INC	Balakrishnan. S. M	32,273	29.98%	
AIADMK	V. Sathiamoorthy	26,665	24.77%	
AIADMK	Ramassamy. T. M	14,795	13.74%	
Independent	Parasu. S. M	611	0.57%	
Independent	Kovilipillai. G. M	274	0.25%	
Independent	Muthuthevar. K. M	198	0.18%	
Independent	Rajendran. S. M	152	0.14%	
Margin of victory		409	0.38%	−6.75%
Turnout		107,650	64.13%	−1.68%
Registered electors		170,792		
DMK hold		Swing	-9.45%	

=== 1984 ===
1984 Tamil Nadu Legislative Assembly election: Kadaladi
Party	Candidate	Votes	%	±%
DMK	A. Piranavanathan	37,399	39.81%	
Independent	V. Sivathavilli Thevar	30,697	32.67%	
Independent	M. Jeyandirapandi	17,995	19.15%	
Independent	V. Velusami	2,618	2.79%	
Independent	M. M. K Mohammed Ibrahim	2,575	2.74%	
Independent	S. Natrajan	1,265	1.35%	
INC(J)	M. Jailani	622	0.66%	
Independent	A. Duraipandi	586	0.62%	
Independent	M. Kuppusami Yadev	196	0.21%	
Margin of victory		6,702	7.13%	3.00%
Turnout		93,953	65.81%	8.61%
Registered electors		150,980		
DMK gain from AIADMK		Swing	-11.60%	

=== 1980 ===
1980 Tamil Nadu Legislative Assembly election: Kadaladi
Party	Candidate	Votes	%	±%
AIADMK	S. Sathiamoorthy	40,246	51.41%	14.85%
Independent	Abdul Cadir. T. S. O.	37,010	47.28%	
Independent	R. C. Subramanian	603	0.77%	
Independent	Dorairaj. V.	250	0.32%	
Independent	Maruthasamy. K.	175	0.22%	
Margin of victory		3,236	4.13%	−14.92%
Turnout		78,284	57.20%	0.49%
Registered electors		138,693		
AIADMK hold		Swing	14.85%	

=== 1977 ===
1977 Tamil Nadu Legislative Assembly election: Kadaladi
Party	Candidate	Votes	%	±%
AIADMK	R. C. Subramanian	25,690	36.56%	
DMK	A. Piranavanathan	12,299	17.50%	−47.36%
Independent	K. Govindan	9,174	13.06%	
JP	P.A.S. Abdul Hannan Sahib	8,746	12.45%	
INC	S. Muniyandi Thevar	6,947	9.89%	
Independent	S.P. Murugesan	6,796	9.67%	
Independent	M. Valampuri	408	0.58%	
Independent	Mohamed Sultan	204	0.29%	
Margin of victory		13,391	19.06%	−17.28%
Turnout		70,264	56.70%	2.27%
Registered electors		125,625		
AIADMK gain from DMK		Swing	-28.30%	

=== 1971 ===
1971 Tamil Nadu Legislative Assembly election: Kadaladi
Party	Candidate	Votes	%	±%
DMK	C. Ramalingam	31,521	64.86%	3.37%
SWA	Alangaram M.	13,863	28.53%	
Independent	Kizhavan K.	1,806	3.72%	
Independent	Pandy T.	634	1.30%	
Independent	Rajam Tirumathi P. R.	531	1.09%	
Independent	Krishnan S.	242	0.50%	
Margin of victory		17,658	36.34%	7.52%
Turnout		48,597	54.44%	−18.62%
Registered electors		99,347		
DMK hold		Swing	3.37%	

=== 1967 ===
1967 Madras Legislative Assembly election: Kadaladi
Party	Candidate	Votes	%	±%
DMK	M. Alangaram	38,681	61.50%	
INC	K. Paramalai	20,556	32.68%	
Independent	M. Pandi	3,662	5.82%	
Margin of victory		18,125	28.82%	
Turnout		62,899	73.06%	
Registered electors		89,895		
DMK win (new seat)				
