= K. Patinetampatian =

Indian politician

K. Patinetampatian is an Indian politician and former Member of the Legislative Assembly of Tamil Nadu. He was elected to the Tamil Nadu Legislative Assembly as an All India Anna Dravida Munnetra Kazhagam candidate from the Mudukulathur constituency in the 2001 election.
