= T. Thangappan =

Indian politician

T. Thangappan was an Indian politician from Dravida Munnetra Kazhagam, and former Member of the Legislative Assembly from Madras State (later Tamil Nadu).

== Political career ==
During the 1967 Madras State Legislative Assembly election, Thangappan was elected from Ramanathapuram constituency by a margin of 8,610 votes. By his victory, he ended the three-term-streak of his predecessor Shanmugha Rajeswara Sethupathi (the then Zamindar of Ramnad who contested as an Indian National Congress candidate).

This feat made C. Rajagopalachari to describe Thangappan as the ‘Julius Caesar of South India’.

1967 Madras Legislative Assembly election: Ramanathapuram
Party	Candidate	Votes	%	±%
DMK	T. Thangappan	35,880	56.82%	New
INC	Shanmugha Rajeswara Sethupathi	27,270	43.18%	−18.74
Margin of victory		8,610	13.63%	−22.99%
Turnout		63,150	76.81%	7.30%
Registered electors		84,526		
DMK gain from INC		Swing	-5.11%	
