= T. L. Sasivarna Thevar =

Indian politician

T. L. Sasivarna Thevar was an Indian politician and former Member of the Legislative Assembly of Tamil Nadu. He was elected to the Tamil Nadu legislative assembly as a Forward Bloc candidate from Mudukulathur constituency in 1962 election.
