= M. S. K. Rajendran =

Indian politician

M. S. K. Rajendran is an Indian politician and former Member of the Legislative Assembly of Tamil Nadu. He was elected to the Tamil Nadu Legislative Assembly as a Dravida Munnetra Kazhagam candidate from Ramanathapuram constituency in 1989 election.
