= T. Ramasamy (AIADMK politician) =

- த. இராமசாமி

Member of the Tamil Nadu Legislative Assembly
- In office 1977–1989
- Preceded by: M. S. K. Sathiyendran
- Succeeded by: M. S. K. Rajendran
- Constituency: Ramanathapuram

Personal details
- Born: 17 July 1942 Ramanathapuram, Tamil Nadu, India
- Died: 19 December 2004 (aged 62)
- Party: All India Anna Dravida Munnetra Kazhagam
- Profession: Merchant

T. Ramasamy (17 July 1942 – 19 December 2004) was an Indian politician and a former Member of the Legislative Assembly (MLA) of Tamil Nadu. Born in Ramanathapuram on July 17, 1942, he completed his education at the Ramanathapuram Raja High School and also served as a member of the Ramanathapuram Municipality. Representing the All India Anna Dravida Munnetra Kazhagam (AIADMK), he contested and won the Ramanathapuram assembly constituency elections in 1977, 1980, and 1984, serving three consecutive terms as a legislator.

== Electoral Performance ==
=== 1984 ===
1984 Tamil Nadu Legislative Assembly election: Ramanathapuram
Party	Candidate	Votes	%	±%
AIADMK	T. Ramasamy	56,342	59.91%	+2.27
DMK	M. S. Abdul Raheem	35,615	37.87%	New
Independent	P. Chellathurai	1,345	1.43%	New
Margin of victory		20,727	22.04%	4.58%
Turnout		94,047	75.14%	7.03%
Registered electors		130,455		
AIADMK hold		Swing	2.27%	

=== 1980 ===
1980 Tamil Nadu Legislative Assembly election: Ramanathapuram
Party	Candidate	Votes	%	±%
AIADMK	T. Ramasamy	46,987	57.63%	+10.77
INC	Zeenath Sheriffdeen	32,755	40.18%	New
JP	Y. Sahul Hameed	990	1.21%	New
Margin of victory		14,232	17.46%	−7.40%
Turnout		81,527	68.11%	2.78%
Registered electors		121,008		
AIADMK hold		Swing	10.77%	

=== 1977 ===
1977 Tamil Nadu Legislative Assembly election: Ramanathapuram
Party	Candidate	Votes	%	±%
AIADMK	T. Ramasamy	33,048	46.86%	New
JP	S. K. Ganesan	15,520	22.01%	New
DMK	S. Marimuthu	11,448	16.23%	−48.82
CPI	M. Ramaswamy	9,984	14.16%	New
Independent	A. Mani	524	0.74%	New
Margin of victory		17,528	24.85%	−8.79%
Turnout		70,524	65.33%	−6.43%
Registered electors		109,710		
AIADMK gain from DMK		Swing	-18.19%	
