= K. Muthuvel =

Indian politician

K. Muthuvel (1 July 1946 – 23 July 2016) was an Indian politician and former Member of the Legislative Assembly of Tamil Nadu. He was elected to the Tamil Nadu legislative assembly from the Mudukulathur constituency in the 1984 election.

== Early life ==
Muthuvel was born to Karupaiya Thevar and Lakshmiamal on 1 July 1946 in N. Karisalkulam village, near Kamuthi, Ramanathapuram District. He participated in many activities as a student leader. He served as a Revenue Inspector in R. S. Mangalam, Ramanathapuram, and later elected as the President of N. Karisalkulam village.

== Political career ==
He joined Forward Bloc, an Indian National Political Party formed by Subhas Chandra Bose under the guidance of Pasumpon Muthuramalinga Thevar.

Muthuvel was elected as the Central Committee member of the All India Forward Bloc. He became Joint Secretary of Pasumpon Muthuramalinga Thevar College, in Kamuthi.

He was elected to the Tamil Nadu legislative assembly from the Mudukulathur constituency in the 1984 election. He made a famous speech against a Member of the legislative council in the Tamil Nadu legislative assembly.

He was elected State President of All India Forward Bloc, Tamil Nadu division. He became President of Pasumpon Muthuramalinga Thevar trust, Kamuthi and took several steps designed to uplift all backward class communities in southern Tamil Nadu. He worked for the upliftment of downtrodden people.
