= R. R. Thevar =

Indian politician

R. R. Thevar was an Indian politician and member of the legislative assembly of Tamil Nadu. He was elected to the Tamil Nadu legislative assembly as a Swatantra Party candidate from the Mudukulathur constituency in the 1967 election.
