= A. Piranavanathan =

Indian politician

A. Piranavanathan was an Indian politician and former Member of the Legislative Assembly of Tamil Nadu. He was elected to the Tamil Nadu legislative assembly as a Dravida Munnetra Kazhagam candidate from Kadaladi constituency in 1984 election.
