= Suba Thangavelan =

Indian politician

- Born: March 31, 1936 (age 88); P. Kodikulam, Ramanathapuram district, Tamil Nadu
- Occupation: politician

Suba Thangavelan, also known as S. P. Thangavelan, (born 31 March 1936) is an Indian politician and former minister for slum clearance and Accommodation Control in the Government of Tamil Nadu. He was elected as a member of Tamil Nadu Legislative Assembly from Tiruvadanai constituency in 2011.

Thangavelan was elected to the Tamil Nadu Legislative Assembly as a Dravida Munnetra Kazhagam candidate from Kadaladi constituency in the 1996 and 2006 elections.

== Personal life ==
Thangavelan was born in Thaniyappuli P. Kodikkulam on 31 March 1936. He has completed his SSLC education.
