= M. S. K. Sathyendran =

Indian politician

M. S. K. Sathyendran was an Indian politician and former Member of the Legislative Assembly of Tamil Nadu. He was elected to the Tamil Nadu legislative assembly as a Dravida Munnetra Kazhagam candidate from Ramanathapuram constituency in the 1971 election.
