= K. Murugavel =

Indian politician

K. Murugavel is an Indian politician. He currently serves as a Member of the Legislative Assembly of Tamil Nadu.

K. Murugavel was elected to the Tamil Nadu legislative assembly as a Dravida Munnetra Kazhagam candidate from Mudukulathur constituency in 2006 election. It is reported that there was development in his constituency during the period between 2006 and 2011.
