= S. Pandi =

Indian politician

S.Malaysia Pandian (Born 10 February 1947) is an Indian politician from the Indian National Congress and a member of the Tamil Nadu Legislative Assembly representing the Mudukulathur constituency.

He is known for his politics in Mudukulathur legislative assembly. He won in the election with the help of his own community. The majority of yadava people's supported Pandi and they made him won. He is from the Indian National Congress party as many of the people who won in Mudukulathur assembly are INC. The Former INC president S. Balakrishnan (Mudukulathur MLA) is from the mudukulathur constituency.
