= S. M. Muhammed Sheriff =

Indian politician

S. M. Muhammed Sheriff was an Indian politician and former Member of Parliament elected from Tamil Nadu. He was born on July 15, 1924 at Madurai. His father was Muhammed Mathar Rowther. His wife's name was M. A. Jowaharunnisa.

In 1967, he was elected to Ramnad Lok sabha constituency for 4th Lok Sabha. However, the 4th Lok Sabha was dissolved earlier than 5 year in 1970 and fresh elections were held in 1971. He was elected to the 5th Lok Sabha from Periyakulam constituency as an Indian Union Muslim League candidate in the 1971 election.

On July 23rd, 1974, when Statements regarding "Agreement between India and Sri Lanka on boundary in Historical Waters between the Two countries and related matters" was to be made by then Indian External Affairs Minister Sri Swaran Singh in Parliament, S. M. Muhammed Sheriff walked out opposing the Agreement. Along with him, Forward Bloc MP P. K. Mookkiah Thevar of who was also the then MP of Ramnad Lok Sabha constituency, also walked out.
