= P. Subbiah Ambalam =

Indian politician

MP P. Subbiah Ambalam

Members of the 2nd Lok Sabha
- In office 1957–1962
- Constituency: Ramanathapuram

Personal details
- Born: Ramanathapuram, India
- Party: Indian National Congress
- Spouse: Pappathy Ammal
- Children: 5
- Education: Dr. Ambedkar Government Law College, Chennai

Periannan Subbiah Ambalam was an Indian politician and member of parliament who was elected to the 2nd Lok Sabha, representing Ramanathapuram parliamentary constituency from 1957 to 62. He was affiliated with the Indian National Congress.

== Biography ==
He was born to Perianan Ambalam on 4 May 1921 in Ramanathapuram district, Tamil Nadu. He received his education from Madras Christian College, Tambaram and Madras Law College, Madras (in modern-day Dr. Ambedkar Government Law College, Chennai).

He was married to Pappathy Ammal, with whom he had five children, including one daughter and four sons.
