= K. Hussan Ali =

Indian politician

K. Hussan Ali is an Indian politician and presently serving Member of the Legislative Assembly of Tamil Nadu. He was elected to the Tamil Nadu Legislative Assembly as an Indian National Congress candidate from Ramanathapuram constituency in 2006 election.
