= V. Rajeshwaran =

Indian politician

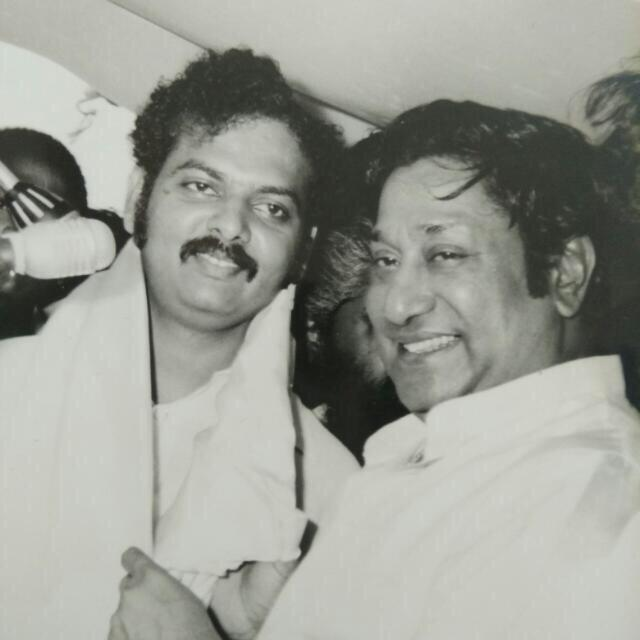
Dr. V. Rajeshwaran with Actor Sivaji Ganesan during a function

Dr. Vadivel Rajeshwaran M.B.B.S (1 October 1950 – 6 June 2021) was an Indian politician and three-time Member of Parliament elected from Tamil Nadu. He was elected to the Lok Sabha from Ramanathapuram constituency as an Indian National Congress candidate in the 1984, 1989 and 1991 elections.

He was known for his contributions to healthcare, rural development, and regional infrastructure during his tenure. A member of the Indian National Congress and later the Nationalist Congress Party and Anna Dravidar Kazhagam, he remained a respected figure in Tamil Nadu politics throughout his career.

== Early life and education ==
Rajeshwaran was born on 1 October 1950 to Mr. Vadivel Thevar, judge and District Magistrate, and Mrs. Nagarathinam. He was the eldest of ten children. His grandfather, Andi Thevar, was a well-known landlord from Paduvanenthal village in Kadaladi Taluk, Ramanathapuram District. His father was an admirer of Pasumpon Muthuramalinga Thevar, whose political legacy influenced Rajeshwaran from a young age.

He completed his schooling in Omalur, Panruti, and at Jayaraj Nadar School in Nagamalai Pudukottai. He went on to earn his M.B.B.S. degree from Madurai Medical College.

== Medical career ==
After graduating, Rajeshwaran began practicing medicine, initially in Nagamalai Pudukottai. Driven by a desire to serve the underprivileged, he later established a hospital in Sattur, where he became widely known as a kind and accessible physician, particularly to the poor and marginalized.

== Political career ==
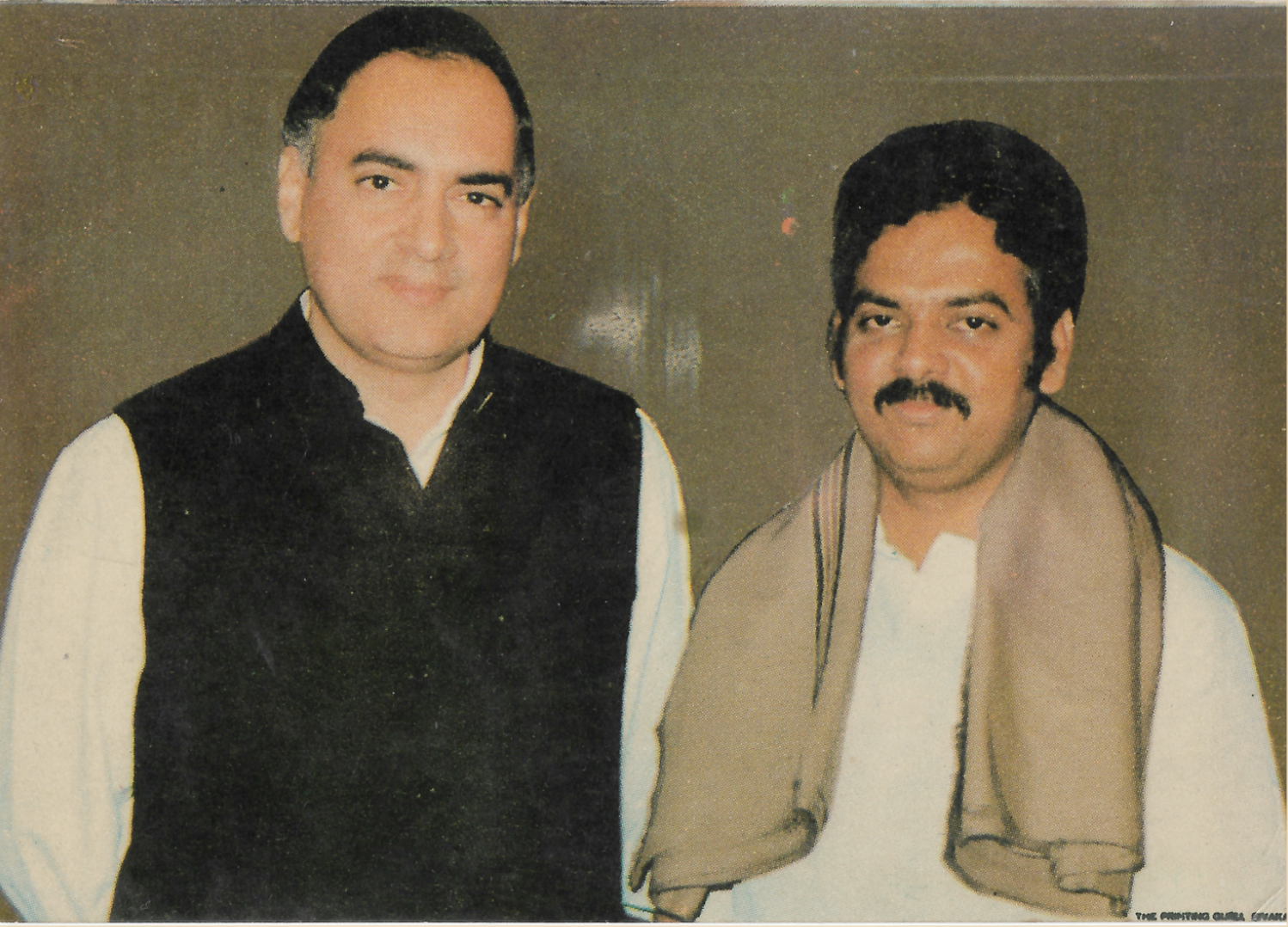
MP Dr. V. Rajeshwaran with Prime Minister Rajiv Gandhi at his residence

Rajeshwaran’s political journey was shaped by his early exposure to the legacy of Pasumpon Muthuramalinga Thevar. Even as a college student, he was determined to enter Parliament—a goal he would achieve multiple times.

He entered electoral politics in the 1984 general election, contesting from Ramanathapuram as a candidate of the AIADMK–Congress alliance, and won. He was re-elected from the same constituency in 1989 and 1991, becoming the first person to win three consecutive terms from Ramanathapuram. In the 1989 election, he secured a record 63.57% vote share—a benchmark still unbeaten in that constituency.

=== Parliamentary achievements ===
As MP, Rajeshwaran played a pivotal role in several development initiatives:

- He brought the Kendriya Vidyalaya school to Rameswaram.
- He was serving as the member of parliament when the construction of the Pamban Bridge was completed. The bridge was inaugurated by the then prime minister Rajiv Gandhi, with Dr. V. Rajeshwaran standing alongside him during this historic occasion.
- He advocated strongly for Tamil Nadu fishermen affected by Sri Lankan naval attacks and convinced PM Rajiv Gandhi to station an Indian Navy vessel permanently in Tamil Nadu waters for their protection.
- He facilitated the installation of Asia’s largest Doordarshan transmission tower in Rameswaram.
- He campaigned for the Sethusamudram Shipping Canal Project and improved drinking water access to numerous rural communities.
- He was the first MP to propose naming Madurai Airport after Pasumpon Muthuramalinga Thevar.

During Rajiv Gandhi’s visit to Ramanathapuram, Dr. Rajeshwaran brought him to the memorial of Muthuramalinga Thevar. Rajiv Gandhi became the only Indian prime minister to pay homage at the Thevar memorial.

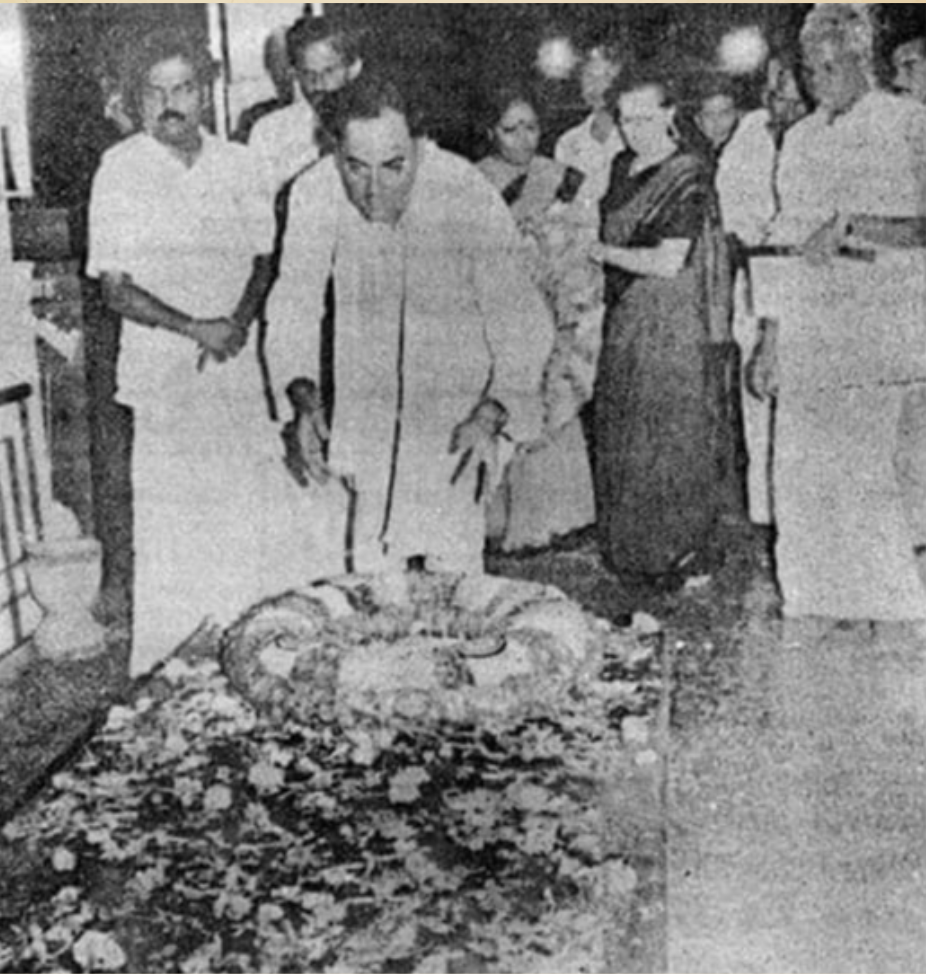
A rare and historic photograph showing Dr. V. Rajeshwaran standing alongside Prime Minister Rajiv Gandhi paying homage at the memorial of Pasumpon Muthuramalinga Thevar—a moment of great political and cultural significance. Senior Congress leader G.K. Moopanar also joined in offering respects.

== Party Affiliation and Later Years ==
Due to political roadblocks, Rajeshwaran eventually left the Indian National Congress and joined the Nationalist Congress Party (NCP), where he served as All India General Secretary under Sharad Pawar. He later joined the Anna Dravidar Kazhagam, led by T.T.V. Dhinakaran, and served as South Zone Secretary until his passing.

== Legacy and death ==
V. Rajeshwaran died on 6 June 2021. He is remembered for his integrity, his commitment to public welfare, and his scandal-free political career spanning over 37 years. His ability to build friendships across party lines and his self-funded welfare initiatives made him a highly respected leader among both peers and the public.
