= A. Perumal =

Indian politician

A. Perumal (15 June 1923 – 21 October 1991) was an Indian politician and former Member of the Legislative Assembly of Tamil Nadu. He was elected to the Tamil Nadu legislative assembly as an Indian National Congress candidate from Mudukulathur constituency in 1957 election. He was one of the two winners from the same constituency in that election, the other being U. Muthuramalinga Thevar from the same party. He won 1962 election from Tiruchuli constituency as a Forward Bloc candidate.
