= Kadher Batcha =

Indian politician

S.Vellaichamy (alias Kather Batcha) (c.1932 – 31 August 2012) was an Indian politician and former Member of the Legislative Assembly of Tamil Nadu. He was elected to the Tamil Nadu legislative assembly as an Independent candidate from Mudukulathur constituency in the 1971 election and as a Dravida Munnetra Kazhagam candidate in the 1989 election.

Vellaichamy was murdered in his home on 31 August 2012, aged 80.
