= Ramanathapuram taluk =

Coordinates: 9.367°N 78.835°E

Ramanathapuram taluk is a taluk in the Ramanathapuram district of Tamil Nadu, India. The headquarters is the district seat of Ramanathapuram.

== Demographics ==
According to the 2011 census, the taluk of Ramanathapuram had a population of 414,877 with 210,395 males and 204,482 females. There were 972 women for every 1,000 men. The taluk had a literacy rate of 79.76%. Child population in the age group below 6 years were 19,702 Males and 18,825 Females.
