= Mandapam block =

Mandapam block is a revenue block in the Ramanathapuram district of Tamil Nadu, India. It has a total of 28 panchayat villages.
