= K. Malaisamy =

Indian bureaucrat and politician (1937–2024)

Malaisamy, IAS (1 June 1937 – 6 November 2024) was an Indian bureaucrat turned politician from Tamil Nadu. He was a member of the Indian Administrative Service and served as the Home Secretary of Tamil Nadu from 1991 to 1994. He served as a Member of Parliament in Rajya Sabha, the upper house of the Indian Parliament.

Malaisamy was a member of the All India Anna Dravida Munnetra Kazhagam (AIADMK) until 2014. He was expelled from AIADMK on 15 May 2014 for suggesting that the party's chief Jayalalithaa may ally with Narendra Modi of NDA.

Malaisamy died on 6 November 2024, at the age of 87.
