= Ramanathapuram Assembly constituency =

One of the 234 State Legislative Assembly Constituencies in Tamil Nadu, in India

Coordinates: 9.367°N 78.835°E

Ramanathapuram
- Constituency No. 211 for the Tamil Nadu Legislative Assembly

Constituency details
- Country: India
- Region: South India
- State: Tamil Nadu
- District: Ramanathapuram
- Lok Sabha constituency: Ramanathapuram
- Established: 1951
- Total electors: 312,303

Member of Legislative Assembly
- 17th Tamil Nadu Legislative Assembly
- Incumbent Katharbatcha Muthuramalingam
- Party: DMK
- Elected year: 2026

Ramanathapuram is a state assembly constituency in Ramanathapuram district in Tamil Nadu, India. It is a component of Ramanathapuram Lok Sabha constituency. It is one of the 234 State Legislative Assembly constituencies in Tamil Nadu.

Elections and winners in the constituency are listed below.

== Members of Legislative Assembly ==
=== Madras State ===
Year	Winner	Party
1952	Shanmuga Rajeswara Sethupathy	Indian National Congress
1957	Shanmuga Rajeswara Sethupathy	Independent
1962	Shanmuga Rajeswara Sethupathy	Indian National Congress
1967	T. Thangappan	Dravida Munnetra Kazhagam

=== Tamil Nadu ===
Year	Winner	Party
1971	M. S. K. Sathyendran	Dravida Munnetra Kazhagam
1977	T. Ramasamy	All India Anna Dravida Munnetra Kazhagam
1980	T. Ramasamy	All India Anna Dravida Munnetra Kazhagam
1984	T. Ramasamy	All India Anna Dravida Munnetra Kazhagam
1989	M. S. K. Rajendran	Dravida Munnetra Kazhagam
1991	M. Thennavan	All India Anna Dravida Munnetra Kazhagam
1996	A. Rahman Khan	Dravida Munnetra Kazhagam
2001	A. Anwar Rhazza	All India Anna Dravida Munnetra Kazhagam
2006	K. Hussan Ali	Indian National Congress
2011	Prof. M. H. Jawahirullah	Manithaneya Makkal Katchi
2016	Dr. M. Manikandan	All India Anna Dravida Munnetra Kazhagam
2021	Katharbatcha Muthuramalingam	Dravida Munnetra Kazhagam
2026	Katharbatcha Muthuramalingam	Dravida Munnetra Kazhagam

== Election results ==
Vote share of winning candidates
2026	37.52%
2021	51.88%
2016	46.30%
2011	40.96%
2006	46.43%
2001	50.21%
1996	51.22%
1991	59.00%
1989	36.21%
1984	59.91%
1980	57.63%
1977	46.86%
1971	65.05%
1967	56.82%
1962	61.92%
1957	81.99%
1952	62.38%

=== 2026 ===
2026 Tamil Nadu Legislative Assembly election: Ramanathapuram
Party	Candidate	Votes	%	±%
DMK	Katharbatcha Muthuramalingam	89,137	37.52	▼14.54
TVK	E. K. Sahul Hameed	76,678	32.28	New
BJP	GBS K. Nagendran	57,730	24.3	▼4.18
NTK	Muthu Kesavan	10,766	4.53	▼3.47
NOTA	NOTA	953	0.4	
Margin of victory		12,459		
Turnout		2,37,576		
Rejected ballots				
Registered electors		310,165		
DMK hold		Swing		

=== 2021 ===
2021 Tamil Nadu Legislative Assembly election: Ramanathapuram
Party	Candidate	Votes	%	±%
DMK	Katharbatcha Muthuramalingam	111,075	52.06	New
BJP	D. Kuppuramu	60,763	28.48	+20.69
NTK	K. Ilango	17,062	8.00	+5.92
Independent	P. Malaichamy	10,845	5.08	New
AMMK	G. Muniyasamy	6,776	3.18	New
MNM	K. P Saravanan	1,996	0.94	New
Independent	E. Vinoth	1,219	0.57	New
Margin of victory		50,312	23.58	+6.37
Turnout		213,345	69.20	+1.34
DMK gain from AIADMK		Swing	+5.76	

=== 2016 ===
2016 Tamil Nadu Legislative Assembly election: Ramanathapuram
Party	Candidate	Votes	%	±%
AIADMK	M. Manikandan	89,365	46.30	New
MNMK	Dr. M. H. Jawahirullah	56,143	29.09	−11.87
DMDK	M. A. Singai Jinnah	16,353	8.47	New
BJP	D. Kannan	15,029	7.79	−9.67
NTK	K. Sivakumar	4,001	2.07	New
NOTA	NOTA	1,528	0.79	New
Margin of victory		33,222	17.21	7.41
Turnout		193,002	67.86	−3.19
AIADMK gain from MNMK		Swing	+5.34	

=== 2011 ===
2011 Tamil Nadu Legislative Assembly election: Ramanathapuram
Party	Candidate	Votes	%	±%
MNMK	Dr. M. H. Jawahirullah	65,831	40.96	New
INC	K. Hussan Ali	50,074	31.16	−15.27
BJP	D. Kannan	28,060	17.46	+13.56
INL	K. Raja Hussain	3,606	2.24	New
Margin of victory		15,757	9.81	+0.53
Turnout		160,703	71.05	+2.54
MNMK gain from INC		Swing	-5.46	

=== 2006 ===
2006 Tamil Nadu Legislative Assembly election: Ramanathapuram
Party	Candidate	Votes	%	±%
INC	K. Hussan Ali	66,922	46.43%	New
MDMK	M. Palanichamy	53,555	37.15%	+34.3
DMDK	S. Dharmaraj	12,070	8.37%	New
BJP	A. Sathiah	5,624	3.90%	New
Independent	C. Rajendiran	1,012	0.70%	New
Independent	S. Viswanathan	974	0.68%	New
Margin of victory		13,367	9.27%	1.63%
Turnout		144,149	68.50%	1.45%
Registered electors		210,426		
INC gain from AIADMK		Swing	-3.78%	

=== 2001 ===
2001 Tamil Nadu Legislative Assembly election: Ramanathapuram
Party	Candidate	Votes	%	±%
AIADMK	A. Anwar Rhazza	59,824	50.21%	+29.73
DMK	A. Rahman Khan	50,712	42.56%	−8.66
MDMK	M. Patrick	3,399	2.85%	−1.26
Independent	Rajaji N	2,285	1.92%	New
Independent	M. Jeyakumar	1,458	1.22%	New
Margin of victory		9,112	7.65%	−23.10%
Turnout		119,150	67.05%	0.07%
Registered electors		177,797		
AIADMK gain from DMK		Swing	-1.01%	

=== 1996 ===
1996 Tamil Nadu Legislative Assembly election: Ramanathapuram
Party	Candidate	Votes	%	±%
DMK	A. Rahman Khan	59,794	51.22%	+21.12
AIADMK	S. K. G. Sekar	23,903	20.47%	−38.52
Independent	T. Ramasamy	17,009	14.57%	New
Independent	R. Kalanjiyam	7,647	6.55%	New
MDMK	K. Singaraj	4,796	4.11%	New
BJP	M. Rajan	2,161	1.85%	−0.98
Margin of victory		35,891	30.74%	1.85%
Turnout		116,745	66.98%	5.45%
Registered electors		186,156		
DMK gain from AIADMK		Swing	-7.78%	

=== 1991 ===
1991 Tamil Nadu Legislative Assembly election: Ramanathapuram
Party	Candidate	Votes	%	±%
AIADMK	M. Thennavan	62,004	59.00	+35.97
DMK	M. A. Kader	31,635	30.10	−6.11
PMK	K. Raja Hussain	7,063	6.72	New
BJP	M. A. Muniyasamy	2,971	2.83	New
Margin of victory		30,369	28.90	+15.71
Turnout		105,098	61.53	−8.11
Registered electors		176,322		
AIADMK gain from DMK		Swing	+22.78	

=== 1989 ===
1989 Tamil Nadu Legislative Assembly election: Ramanathapuram
Party	Candidate	Votes	%	±%
DMK	M. S. K. Rajendran	38,747	36.21%	−1.65
AIADMK	S. Sekar	24,636	23.03%	−36.88
Independent	M. S. A. Shajahan	19,598	18.32%	New
AIADMK	A. Anwar Raja	15,584	14.57%	−45.34
Independent	S. K. Ganesan	4,746	4.44%	New
Independent	A. Mohamed Moosa	1,766	1.65%	New
Margin of victory		14,111	13.19%	−8.85%
Turnout		106,993	69.64%	−5.50%
Registered electors		156,764		
DMK gain from AIADMK		Swing	-23.69%	

=== 1984 ===
1984 Tamil Nadu Legislative Assembly election: Ramanathapuram
Party	Candidate	Votes	%	±%
AIADMK	T. Ramasamy	56,342	59.91%	+2.27
DMK	M. S. Abdul Raheem	35,615	37.87%	New
Independent	P. Chellathurai	1,345	1.43%	New
Margin of victory		20,727	22.04%	4.58%
Turnout		94,047	75.14%	7.03%
Registered electors		130,455		
AIADMK hold		Swing	2.27%	

=== 1980 ===
1980 Tamil Nadu Legislative Assembly election: Ramanathapuram
Party	Candidate	Votes	%	±%
AIADMK	T. Ramasamy	46,987	57.63%	+10.77
INC	Zeenath Sheriffdeen	32,755	40.18%	New
JP	Y. Sahul Hameed	990	1.21%	New
Margin of victory		14,232	17.46%	−7.40%
Turnout		81,527	68.11%	2.78%
Registered electors		121,008		
AIADMK hold		Swing	10.77%	

=== 1977 ===
1977 Tamil Nadu Legislative Assembly election: Ramanathapuram
Party	Candidate	Votes	%	±%
AIADMK	T. Ramasamy	33,048	46.86%	New
JP	S. K. Ganesan	15,520	22.01%	New
DMK	S. Marimuthu	11,448	16.23%	−48.82
CPI	M. Ramaswamy	9,984	14.16%	New
Independent	A. Mani	524	0.74%	New
Margin of victory		17,528	24.85%	−8.79%
Turnout		70,524	65.33%	−6.43%
Registered electors		109,710		
AIADMK gain from DMK		Swing	-18.19%	

=== 1971 ===
1971 Tamil Nadu Legislative Assembly election: Ramanathapuram
Party	Candidate	Votes	%	±%
DMK	M. S. K. Sathyendran	40,690	65.05%	+8.24
INC	R. Balagangadharan	19,649	31.41%	−11.77
Independent	E. M. Abduliah	1,632	2.61%	New
Independent	V. A. Mani	578	0.92%	New
Margin of victory		21,041	33.64%	20.01%
Turnout		62,549	71.76%	−5.05%
Registered electors		92,658		
DMK hold		Swing	8.24%	

=== 1967 ===
1967 Madras Legislative Assembly election: Ramanathapuram
Party	Candidate	Votes	%	±%
DMK	T. Thangappan	35,880	56.82%	New
INC	Shanmugha Rajeswara Sethupathi	27,270	43.18%	−18.74
Margin of victory		8,610	13.63%	−22.99%
Turnout		63,150	76.81%	7.30%
Registered electors		84,526		
DMK gain from INC		Swing	-5.11%	

=== 1962 ===
1962 Madras Legislative Assembly election: Ramanathapuram
Party	Candidate	Votes	%	±%
INC	Shanmuga Rajeshwara Sethupathi	44,942	61.92%	New
IUML	S. Abdul Rahim	18,363	25.30%	New
SWA	N. Padmanaban	5,058	6.97%	New
Independent	S. Kodangi	2,238	3.08%	New
Independent	M. Sathiah	1,977	2.72%	New
Margin of victory		26,579	36.62%	−27.36%
Turnout		72,578	69.51%	18.08%
Registered electors		107,593		
INC gain from Independent		Swing	-20.07%	

=== 1957 ===
1957 Madras Legislative Assembly election: Ramanathapuram
Party	Candidate	Votes	%	±%
Independent	R. Shanmuga Rajeshwara Sethupathi	40,577	81.99%	New
CPI	G. Mangalasamy	8,912	18.01%	−4.53
Margin of victory		31,665	63.98%	24.14%
Turnout		49,489	51.43%	−1.11%
Registered electors		96,220		
Independent gain from INC		Swing	19.61%	

=== 1952 ===
1952 Madras Legislative Assembly election: Ramanathapuram
Party	Candidate	Votes	%	±%
INC	Shanmuga Rajeswara Sethupathy	26,131	62.38%	New
CPI	Rajamanickam	9,440	22.53%	New
KMPP	Meera Hussain	3,287	7.85%	New
Margin of victory		16,691	39.84%	
Turnout		41,892	52.54%	
Registered electors		79,728		
INC win (new seat)				
