= V. Sathiamoorthy =

Indian politician

V. Sathiamoorthy is an Indian politician and former Member of the Legislative Assembly of Tamil Nadu. He was elected to the Tamil Nadu legislative assembly as an All India Anna Dravida Munnetra Kazhagam candidate from Kadaladi constituency in 1991 election. He later joined to Dravida Munnetra Kazhagam in presence of M. K. Azhagiri in 2010.
