= Thiruppalaikudi =

- Nickname: TPK
- Interactive map of Thiruppalaikudi
- Coordinates: 11°55′N 78°20′E
- Country: India
- State: Tamil Nadu
- District: Ramanathapuram
- Taluka: R.S.Mangalam

Government
- Elevation: 45 m (148 ft)

Population (2011)
  - Total: 8,824
- Time zone: IST (UTC+5:30)
- Postal code: 623531
- Area code: 04561

Thirupalaikudi (natively known as TPK) is a small town in R. S. Mangalam Taluka in Ramanathapuram District of the Indian state of Tamil Nadu.

== Geography ==
It is near the Bay of Bengal and features a humid climate. It is located 24 kilometres north of District headquarters Ramanathapuram and 480 kilometres from State capital Chennai. Thiruppalaikudi is surrounded by Ramanathapuram, Devipattinam, Thondi, R. S. Mangalam, Nambuthalai

== Economy ==
Thirupalaikudi is located marine landscape, the people of this village earn their main income from fishing, and they also earn income through self-employment such as animal husbandry, agriculture, construction, and part-time wage work such as salting and shrimp farming, Apart from being an area with less natural resources and water resources, a certain percentage of the men from this village earn their income in the Persian Gulf region, Southeast Asian countries, America and Europe as a migrate workers.
