= List of airports in Tamil Nadu =

Airports in Tamil Nadu

The Indian state of Tamil Nadu has four international, and six domestic or private airports. Chennai International Airport, which is the fifth busiest airport by passenger traffic in India, is a major international airport and the main gateway to the state. Other international airports in the state include Coimbatore, Tiruchirapalli, and Madurai. Domestic flights are operational to certain airports like Thoothukudi and Salem while flights are planned to be introduced to more domestic airports by the UDAN scheme of Government of India.

The Southern Air Command of the Indian Air Force operates three air bases in the state Sulur, Tambaram and Thanjavur. The Eastern Naval Command of the Indian Navy operates airbases at Uchipuli and Chennai. The Southern Naval Command of the Indian Navy operates an airbase at Arakkonam. The Indian Coast Guard operates an air station in Chennai.

The aviation history of the state began in 1910, when Giacomo D'Angelis built the first powered flight in Asia and tested it in Island Grounds. In 1915, Tata Air Mail started an airmail service between Karachi and Madras, marking the beginning of civil aviation in India. On 15 October 1932, J. R. D. Tata flew a Puss Moth aircraft carrying air mail from Karachi to Bombay's Juhu Airstrip and the flight was continued to Madras piloted by aviator Nevill Vintcent marking the first scheduled commercial flight.

== Civilian airports ==
Civilian airports
Airport	Location	IATA Code	ICAO Code	Type	Operational	Owned/operated by
Chennai International Airport	Chennai	MAA	VOMM	International	Yes	Airports Authority of India
Coimbatore International Airport	Coimbatore	CJB	VOCB	International	Yes	Airports Authority of India
Hosur Aerodrome	Hosur		VO95	State/Private	Limited (Note: Used for maintenance, repair and overhaul operations)	Taneja Aerospace
Madurai International Airport	Madurai	IXM	VOMD	International	Yes	Airports Authority of India
Neyveli Airport	Neyveli	NVY	VONY	State/Private	No	Neyveli Lignite Corporation
Salem Airport	Salem	SXV	VOSM	Domestic	Yes	Airports Authority of India
Thanjavur Airport (Note: Though designated to operate civilian flights as well, the airport is currently used exclusively by the Indian Air Force.)	Thanjavur	TJV	VOTJ	Domestic	No	Airports Authority of India and Ministry of Defence
Thoothukudi Airport	Thoothukudi	TCR	VOTK	Domestic	Yes	Airports Authority of India
Tiruchirappalli International Airport	Tiruchirappalli	TRZ	VOTR	International	Yes	Airports Authority of India
Vellore Airport	Vellore		VOVR	Domestic	No	Airports Authority of India

== Military airbases ==
Military airbases
Airbase	Location	IATA Code	ICAO Code	Owned/operated by
Coast Guard Air Station	Chennai (Note: The Coast Guard Air Station operates in the premises of the Chennai International Airport and shares the facilities.)	MAA	VOMM	Indian Coast Guard
INS Parundu	Uchipuli		VORM	Indian Navy
INS Rajali	Arakkonam		VOAR	Indian Navy
Naval Air Enclave	Chennai (Note: The Naval Air Enclave operates in the premises of the Chennai International Airport and shares the facilities.)	MAA	VOMM	Indian Navy
Sulur Air Force Station	Coimbatore		VOSX	Indian Air Force
Tambaram Air Force Station	Chennai		VOTX	Indian Air Force
Thanjavur Air Force Station	Thanjavur	TJV	VOTJ	Indian Air Force

== Defunct ==
Defunct airports
Airport	Location
Chettinad Airport	Karaikudi
Cholavaram Airstrip	Chennai
Kayathar Airport	Kayathar
Ulundurpettai Airport	Ulundurpettai
Kovilpatti Airstrip	Kovilpatti
