= Ilanthaikoottam =

Village in Chittarkottai Panchayat in Tamil Nadu, India

Ilanthaikoottam is a village in Chittarkottai Panchayat in Ramanathapuram district, Tamil Nadu, India.

It is situated 16 km North East from Ramanathapuram. It is located between Devipattinam and Chittarkottai villages. It is 3.5 km away from Devipattinam and 3 km away from Chittarkottai.

== Education ==
Primary school is located in the village up to 5th standard. Till 1970 the education level was low among the girls and the students from the surrounding villages. But after the development of Mohamedia Higher Secondary School, Chittarkottai. the area's education level went up to 95%.

== Temples ==
The village has three temples. Lord Hare Krishna, Vinayagar and Mariyamman Temple
