= Erwadi Santhanakoodu Festival =

The Erwadi Santhanakoodu Festival is a monthlong festival held in Ervadi dargah, located in Ramanathapuram district, to commemorate the anniversary of Sulthan Syed Ibrahim Shaheed Badhusha nayagam whose grave is in Ervadi. The festival is organised as a National Integrity festival by the local Dargah Huqdhar Management Committee (D.H.M.C.), constituting the heirs of badhusha nayagam called as Mujavirs or Levvais. It is a month-long festival happening every Hijri year in the full Islamic month of Zil Qa'dah.

It is organised to commemorate the anniversary of Sulthan Syed Ibrahim Shaheed Badhusha Oliyullah, at the famous Erwadi Dargah which always stands as a symbol of religious harmony. Every year hundreds of thousands of people from a variety of religions and communities within Tamil Nadu and elsewhere throng Erwadi on this day to witness the festival, marking the sandal anointing ceremony of the tomb.

A sense of unity in diversity is exemplified by the 'Santhanakoodu' festival with all community people's participation and contribution and going in a procession, led by a decorated elephant, dancing horse and preceded by a dancing folk arts troupe at midnight. People of all faiths, hue and colour throng the pathway leading to the dargah with reverence, once the procession reach the dargah, people of all religions enter the dargah and offer obeisance. The day is declared a holiday by the district administration and Tamil Nadu State Transport Corporation operates special buses throughout the night for the benefit of devotees.

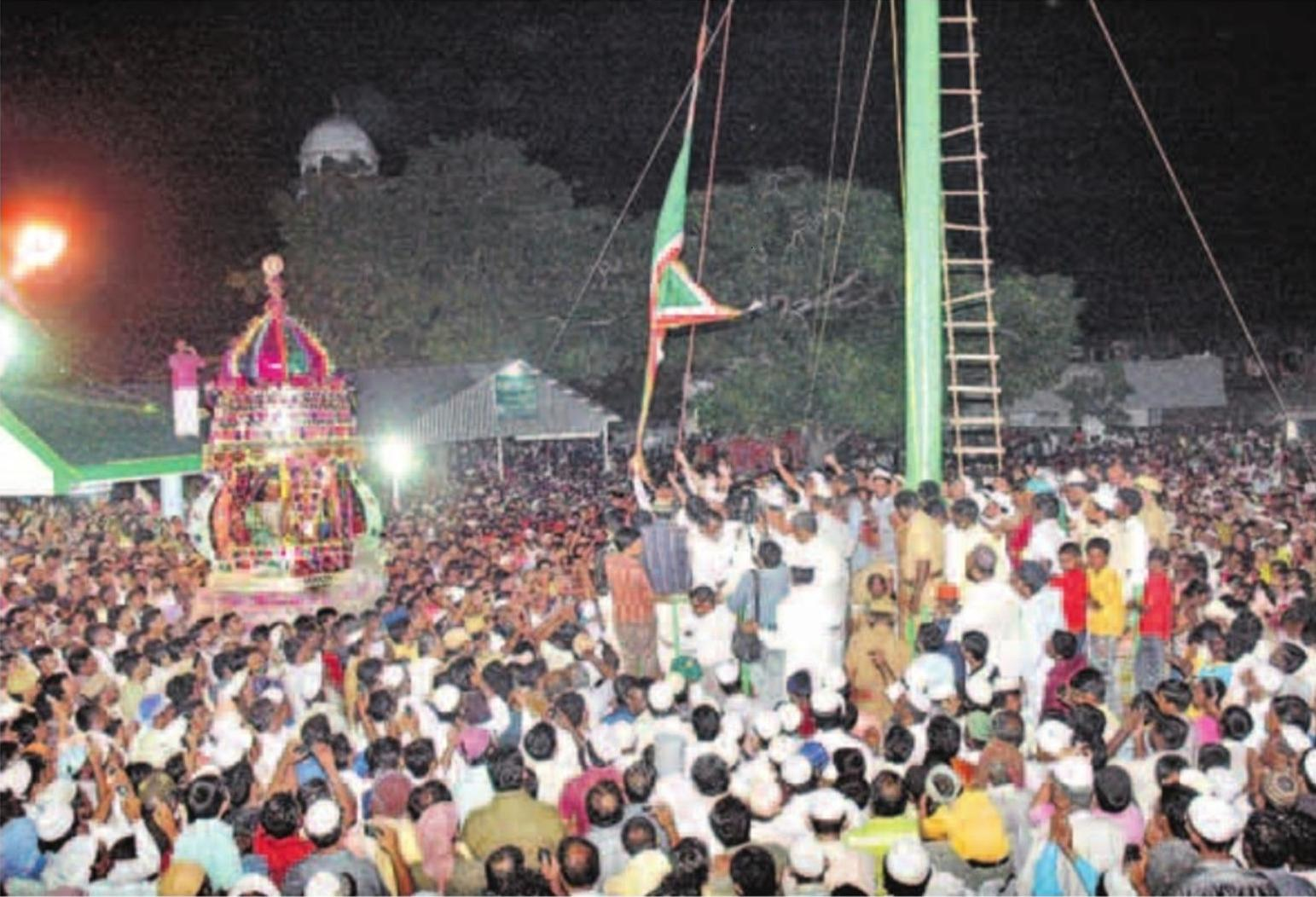
Lakhs of pilgrims witnessing the Holy flag hoisting ceremony at Erwadi dargah, October 2010.

== Ervadi Santhanakoodu Festival 2019 ==
Following is the schedule of the Grand Holy Annual Santhanakoodu (Sandanakoodu) festival commemorating the 843rd Urus festival to be held at Ervadi dargha, Ramanathapuram district for a month's time, from 4 July 2019 to 2 August 2019.

Date	Day	Time	Event
4 July 2019	Thursday	7:00 pm	Beginning of Holy Moulid Shariff
6 July 2019	Saturday	4:30 pm	Mursal Ibrahim Shaheed Rali... Moulid Shariff, Thachu oorani
7 July 2019	Sunday	9:00 am	Ameer Abbas Manthiri Shaheed Rali.. Moulid shariff, Kattupalli.
13 July 2019	Saturday	6:00 am	Recital of Quraan Shariff and Qutb Abuthahir Madani Shaheed Moulidh Shariff, Du'aa.
13 July 2019	Saturday	5:00 pm	Installation of the Lower trunk (ADI MARAM)
14 July 2019	Sunday	6:30 pm	Holy Flag Hoisting (Punithamigu Kodi yetram)
21 July 2019	Sunday	9:00 am	Aboobakkar Abdul Hakkeem Doctor Shaheed Rali... Moulidh Shariff, Kattupalli.
25 July 2019	Thursday	9:00 am	Abdul Khader Mujahid Shaheed, Ghazanfar Muhaiddeen Shaheed (Qadir manthiri, Muhaiddeen manthiri) Moulidh Shariff, Kattupalli.
26 July 2019	Friday	5:30 pm	Beginning of Sandhanakoodu festival, Erwadi dargah.
26 July 2019	Friday	7:00 pm	Fassiyatush Shazuliya Tariqa Zikr Halqa Majlis after Maghrib prayers at Jumma Masjid, Erwadi dargah.
27 July 2019	Saturday	4:30 am	Urus - Sandal Smearing on the Holy Rouza of Qutbul Hamid Gouthul Majid Badhusha Sulthan Syed Ibrahim Shaheed Rali... and Dua
2 August 2019	Friday	5:30 am	Recital of Quran, Qattam Thamaam and Shaheed Badhusha Nayagam - Farewell Moulidh
2 August 2019	Friday	5:00 pm	Dismounting of Holy Flag (Punithamigu Kodi Irakkam)
2 August 2019	Friday	7:00 pm	Holy Thabarruk of Shaheed Badhusha Nayagam Ghee Rice (Nei Soru) distribution

A local district holiday has been announced by the Ramanathapuram district collector and other officials of the District administration on 26 July 2019 for Erwadi Santhanakoodu (Urus) festival 2019.

== Ervadi Santhanakoodu Festival 2018 ==
Following is the schedule of the Santhanakoodu (Sandanakoodu) festival commemorating the 844th Urus festival to be held at Ervadi dargha, Ramanathapuram district for a month's time, from 14 July 2018 to 12 August 2018.

Date	Day	Time	Event
14 July 2018	Saturday	7.00 PM	Beginning of Holy Moulid Shariff
16 July 2018	Monday	4.30 PM	Mursal Ibrahim Shaheed Rali... Moulid Shariff, Thachu oorani
17 July 2018	Tuesday	8.00 AM	Ameer Abbas Manthiri Shaheed Rali.. Moulid shariff, Kattupalli.
23 July 2018	Monday	6.00 AM	Recital of Quraan Shariff and Qutb Abuthahir Madani Shaheed Moulidh Shariff, Du'aa.
23 July 2018	Monday	5.00 PM	Installation of the Lower trunk (ADI MARAM)
24 July 2018	Tuesday	6.30 PM	Holy Flag Hoisting (Punithamigu Kodi yetram)
31 July 2018	Tuesday	09.00 AM	Aboobakkar Abdul Hakkeem Doctor Shaheed Rali... Moulidh Shariff, Kattupalli.
4 August 2018	Saturday	09.00 AM	Abdul Khader Mujahid Shaheed, Ghazanfar Muhaiddeen Shaheed Raliyallahu anhuma (Qadir manthiri, Muhaiddeen manthiri) Moulidh Shariff, Kattupalli.
5 August 2018	Sunday	5.30 PM	Beginning of Sandhanakoodu festival, Erwadi dargah.
5 August 2018	Sunday	7.00 PM	Fassiyatush Shazuliya Tariqa Zikr Halqa (Halara) Majlis after Maghrib prayers at Jumma Masjid, Erwadi dargah.
6 August 2018	Monday	4.30 AM	Urus - Sandal Smearing on the Holy Rouza of Qutbul Hamid Gouthul Majid Badhusha Sulthan Syed Ibrahim Shaheed Rali... and Dua
12 August 2018	Sunday	5.30 AM	Recital of Quran, Qattam Thamaam and Shaheed Badhusha Nayagam - Farewell Moulidh
12 August 2018	Sunday	5.00 PM	Dismounting of Holy Flag (Punithamigu Kodi Irakkam)
23 August 2018	Sunday	7.00 PM	Holy Thabarruk of Shaheed Badhusha Nayagam Ghee Rice (Nei Soru) distribution

A local district holiday has been announced by the Ramanathapuram district collector and other officials of the District administration on 6 August 2018 for Erwadi Santhanakoodu (Urus) festival 2018.
