= Anjukottai =

Coordinates: 9.823207°N 78.941982°E

Anjukottai is a village in northern Ramnad district, Tamil Nadu, India, 4 kilometres (2.5 mi) from Tiruvadanai; and 16 kilometres (9.9 mi) from Thondi. It includes seven small villages: Vaniyenthal, Melavayal, Pottakottai, Manathadal, Karaiyakottai, Chinna Anjukottai and Periya Anjukottai.

Hindus (the majority), Muslims and Christians live there. The village has one mosque, six churches and more than 15 temples. Most of the people are farmers and businessmen.

The Maravar community was the largest.

There are schools, hospitals, a panchayath union, post office, and bus stand. It is back-bone and heart to Thiruvadanai Taluka. Once the Thiruvadanai Taluka was managed by a person from this village who was the chairman Mr. A.T.M.Ramanathan ambalam. After ATMR in 2011 local body election Mrs. Muniyammal Rajendran who belonged to Vaniyenthal village in Anjukottai was selected as Chairman of the Thiruvadanai union. She was the first AIADMK Chairman in Thiruvadanai union .

== Population ==
Statistical analysis base : Census 2001 unless mentioned otherwise
Category	Total	Male	Female
Population	2703	1224	1479
Age 0-6	328	157	171
Agriculture Labour	35	19	16
Literate Population	1555	841	714
Main working population	198	53	145
Casual Working Population	145	25	120
SC Population	522	242	280
ST Population	0	0	0

Total Households 704 Working Population 1406
