= R. S. Mangalam =

R. S. Mangalam Raja Singa Mangalam
- Town panchayat
- Location in Tamil Nadu, India R. S. Mangalam (India)
- Coordinates: 9°36′0″N 78°53′0″E
- Country: India
- State: Tamil Nadu
- District: Ramanathapuram
- Revenue division: Ramanathapuram
- Taluka: R.S.Mangalam

Government
  - Type: First grade Town Panchayat
  - Body: R.S.Mangalam Town Panchayat

Area
  - Total: 13 km^{2} (5.0 sq mi)
- Elevation: 45 m (148 ft)

Population (2011)
  - Total: 14,565
  - Density: 1,098/km^{2} (2,840/sq mi)

Language
  - Official: Tamil
  - Additional official: English
- Time zone: UTC+5:30 (IST)
- PIN: 623 525
- Telephone code: 04561
- Vehicle registration: TN 65 (Ramnad RTO)
- Nearest Town: Ramanathapuram; Paramakudi; Thondi
- Nearest coastal Towns: Devipattinam; Nambuthalai; Thiruppalaikudi
- Nearest railway station: Ramanathapuram Railway Station
- Parliament constituency: Ramanathapuram
- Assembly constituency: Tiruvadanai

R. S. Mangalam, from its complete name Raja Singa Mangalam, is a panchayat town in Ramanathapuram district in the Indian state of Tamil Nadu. It is located 35 Kilometres north from the district headquarters Ramanathapuram.

== Geography ==
R. S. Mangalam is 11 kilometres from the Bay of Bengal and features a humid climate. It is located 35 kilometres north from the district headquarters Ramanathapuram.

R. S. Mangalam is surrounded by Ramanathapuram, Devipattinam, Thondi, Thiruvadanai, Nambuthalai, Thirupalaikudi, ilayangudi and Paramakudi.

=== Areas around R. S. Mangalam ===
- Ramanathapuram (35 km)
- Paramakudi (37 km)
- Thondi (29 km)
- Chittarkottai (29 km)
- Nambuthalai (27 km)
- ilayangudi (26 km)
- Tiruvadanai (21 km)
- Devipattinam (21 km)
- Solandur (10 km)
- Thiruppalaikudi (17 km)
- Uppur, Morepannai (11 km)

== Geography and Water Resources ==
R. S. Mangalam is renowned for the R. S. Mangalam Big Tank (Kanmai), which is the second-largest irrigation tank in Tamil Nadu. The tank spans approximately 20 to 22 kilometers in length. It is a vital water reservoir for the region's agriculture, catching diverted floodwaters from the Vaigai River and the Manimuthar river basin.

Locally, the vast reservoir is historically known by the Tamil phrase "narai parakka mudiyatha 48 madai" (a 48-sluice tank so incredibly large that a crane cannot fly across it). It distributes water to the surrounding villages and farming lands through this massive network of 48 sluices (madai).

== Demographics ==
Religious census 2011
Religion	Percent(%)
Muslims	43.45%
Hindus	48.14%
Christian	8.14%
Sikh	0.01%
Jain	0.00%
Not stated	0.25%

As of 2011 Indian Census, R. S. Mangalam had a total population of 14,565, of which 7,296 were males and 7,269 were females. Population within the age group of 0 to 6 years was 1,662. The total number of literates in R. S. Mangalam was 11,566, which constituted 79.4% of the population with male literacy of 83.5% and female literacy of 75.3%. The effective literacy rate of 7+ population of R. S. Mangalam was 89.6%, of which male literacy rate was 94.7% and female literacy rate was 84.6%. The Scheduled Castes population was 1,551. R. S. Mangalam had 3481 households in 2011.

R.S.Mangalam 2023 Population Current estimated population of R.S.Mangalam Town Panchayat in 2023 is approximately 19,900. The schedule census of 2021 for R.S.Mangalam city is postponed due to covid. We believe new population census for R.S.Mangalam city will be conducted in 2023 and same will be updated once its done. The current data for R.S.Mangalam town are estimated only but all 2011 figures are accurate.
