= Adhi Ratneswarar Temple =

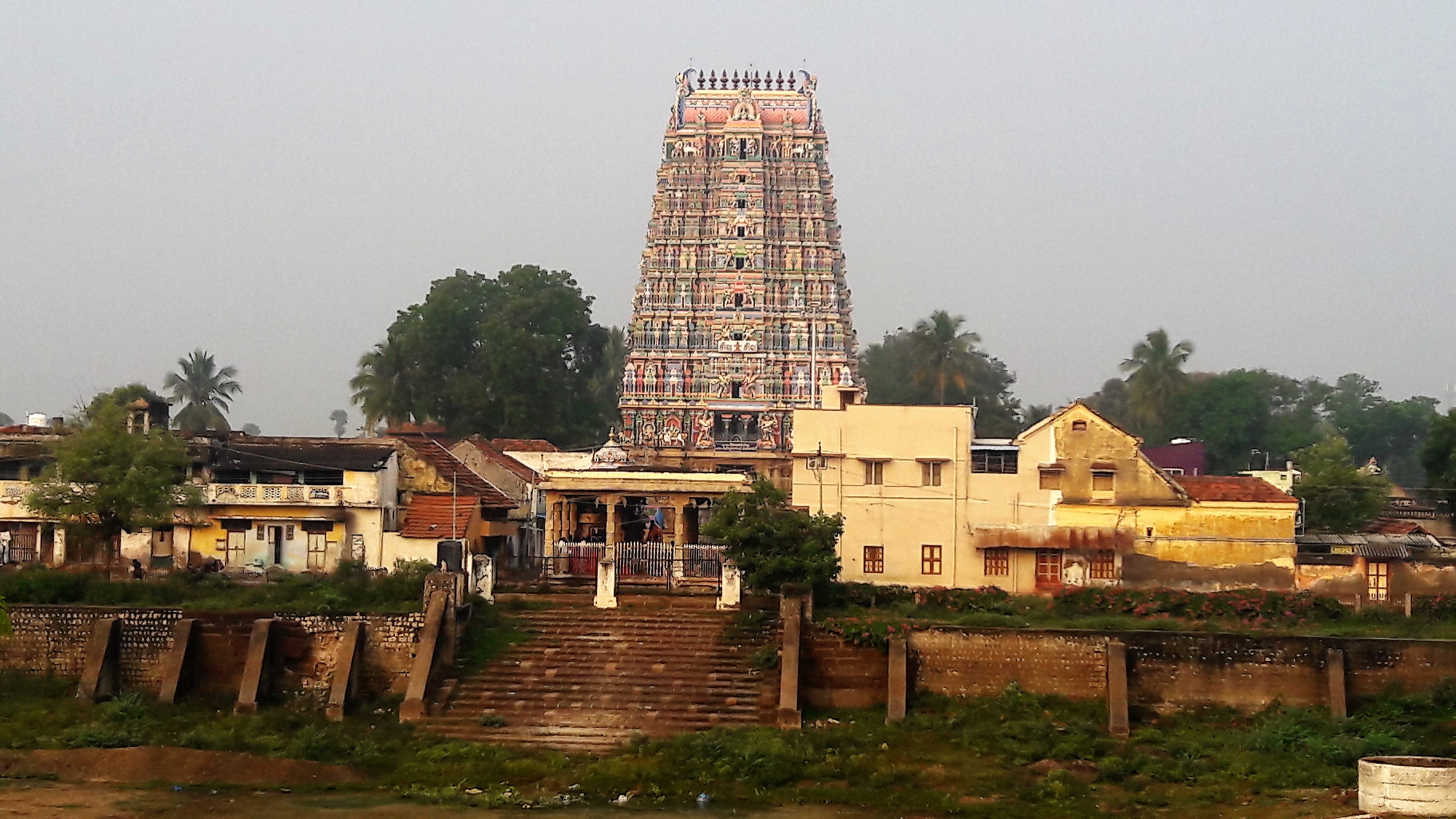

- Location in Tamil Nadu

Religion
- Affiliation: Hinduism
- District: Ramanathapuram
- Deity: Shiva

Location
- State: Tamil Nadu
- Country: India
- Coordinates: 9°47′0″N 78°55′10″E

Architecture
- Type: Dravidian architecture

The Adhi Ratneswarar Temple is a major Hindu temple with Shiva as the presiding deity, located in the town of Tiruvadanai in the state of Tamil Nadu, India.

== Legend ==
Thiruvadanai is one of the many temple towns in the state which is named after the grooves, clusters or forests dominated by a particular variety of a tree or shrub and the same variety of tree or shrub sheltering the presiding deity. The region is believed to have been covered with Vilva forest and hence called Vilvavanam. Legend has it that Vaaruni, the son of Varuna, the God of rain who was cursed by a Sage to have an elephant's body and a goat's head, regained his normal form after worshiping Shiva at this temple. The name of the town is believed to have been derived from this mythological incident(Thiru- sacred; Adu- goat; Aanai- elephant; Thiru Adanai- the sacred place, where the goat-headed-elephant regained his original form).

The Sun God(Suriyan) is said to have worshiped a blue diamond image of Shiva here. Sage Brighu(Brighu Munivar) is also said to have worshiped the Lord here.

Another popular belief is that during the exile of Pandavas, Arjuna got the pasupatha missile from Lord Shiva. He was asked by the Lord to come to Tiruvadanai to know how to use the weapon. As a mark of his devotion(Bhakti), Arjuna installed the shrine(Somaskanda) in the temple.

== History ==
It is one of the shrines of the 275 Paadal Petra Sthalams. This is one of the 14 Shiva temples praised in Thevaram hymns which are located in Paandiya Naadu (south eastern part of Tamil Nadu ). Sages Agasthya, Markandeya and divine cow Kamadenu had worshipped Lord of this temple. Lord Muruga in the temple is praised in the Tirupugazh hymns of saint Arunagirinathar.

== Architecture ==
The Tower (Gopuram) of this temple is a specimen of Dravidian art presented in the upper stories. It was recently renovated by the benign patronage of some film actors of the state. The surface of the Gopuram depicts various lifelike art from the different anecdotes of the Hindu mythology. The pictures are painted in oil and exhibit vivid descriptions of the incidents depicted. The tower can be seen from a colossal distance of about 10 miles from the temple's premises.

== Significance ==
Devotees pray to Lord Adhi Ratneswarar for relief from the evil effects of past deeds. Special Sukhra (Venus planet) Homas are performed on Mother for child boon. Those under planet Shukra’s main or sub-periods are advised to pray to Mother in this temple.

Mother Snehavalli is the deity for the planet, Sukran (Venus). Those consulting Nadi astrology in Tiruvannamalai and Vaitheeshwaran Koil come to this temple to perform the remedial pujas.

The Tamil poet Sambandar is known to have composed the Thevara Pathigam here.

This is one of the Shiva temples offering pujas to the Sun God. It is believed that the Sun worshiped Lord Shiva placing him on a stage made of sapphire gems, hence came the name of the Lord, Adhi Ratneswarar. When the Abhishekams are performed during mid-day, the Lord appears blue.

=== Festivals observed at the Temple ===
- 10-day Vaikasi Visaka Vasanth Utsav (summer festival) in May–June
- 15-day Aadi Pooram in July–August
- Navarathri in September–October
- Shiva-Pradoshams the 13th day of both full moon and new moon fortnights in all months)
- Karthikai in November–December and Chaturthi in the month of Avani(August–September)

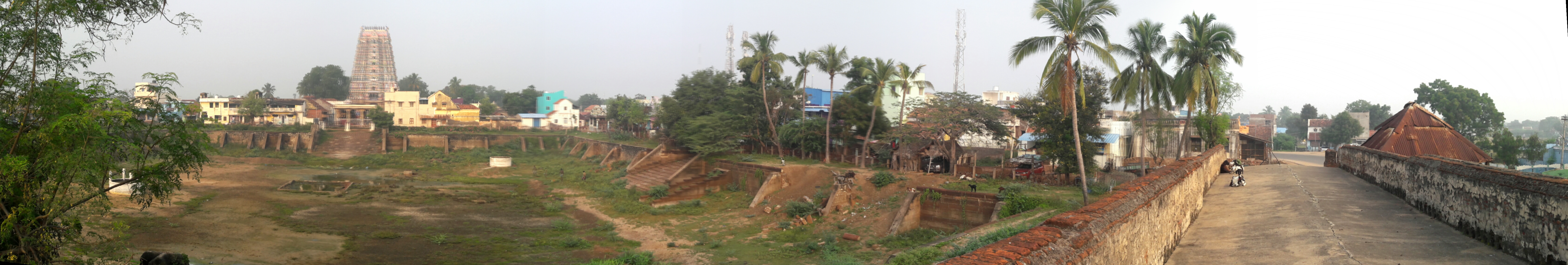
Image of shrines inside the temple

== Gallery ==
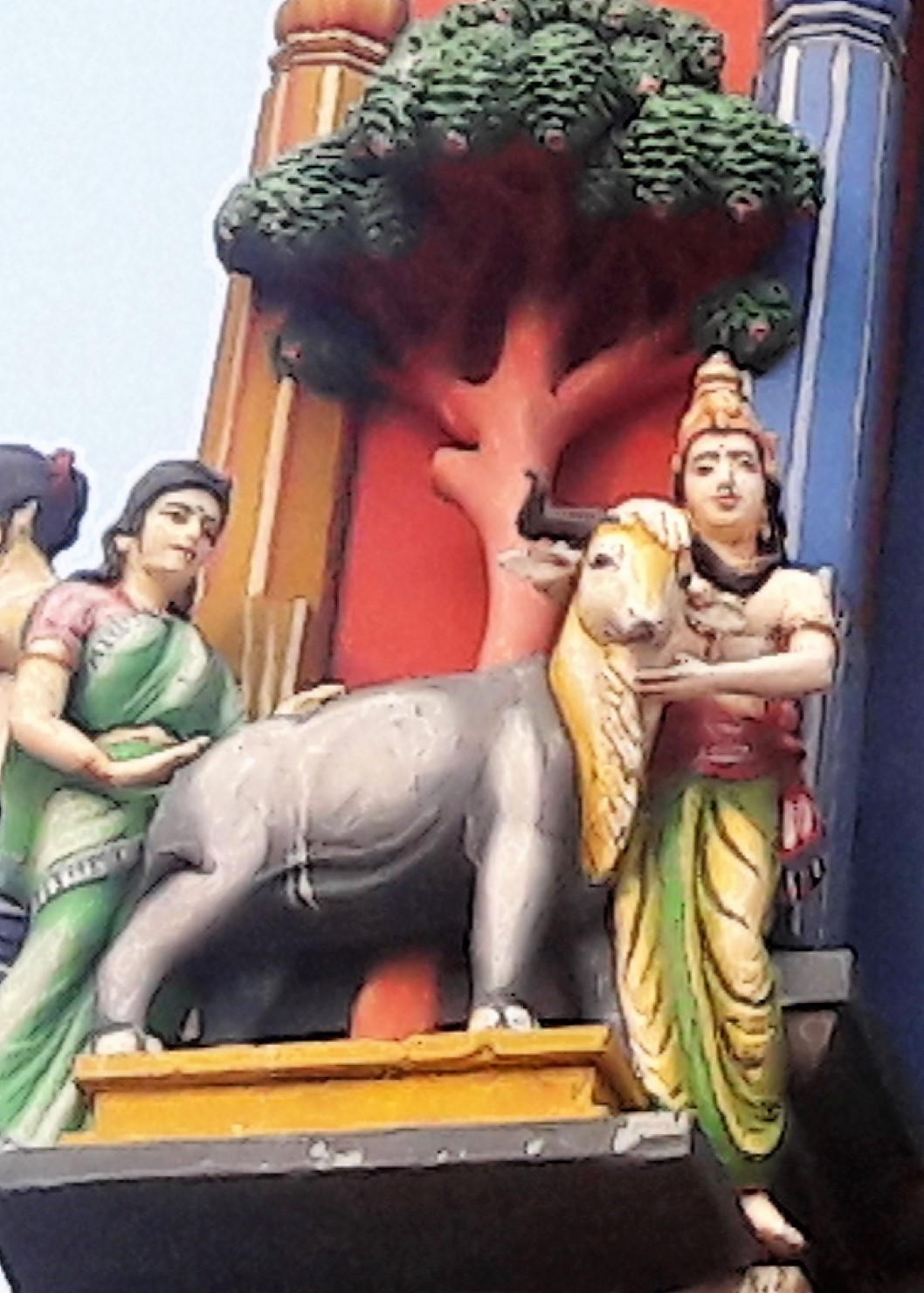
Legend of the temple

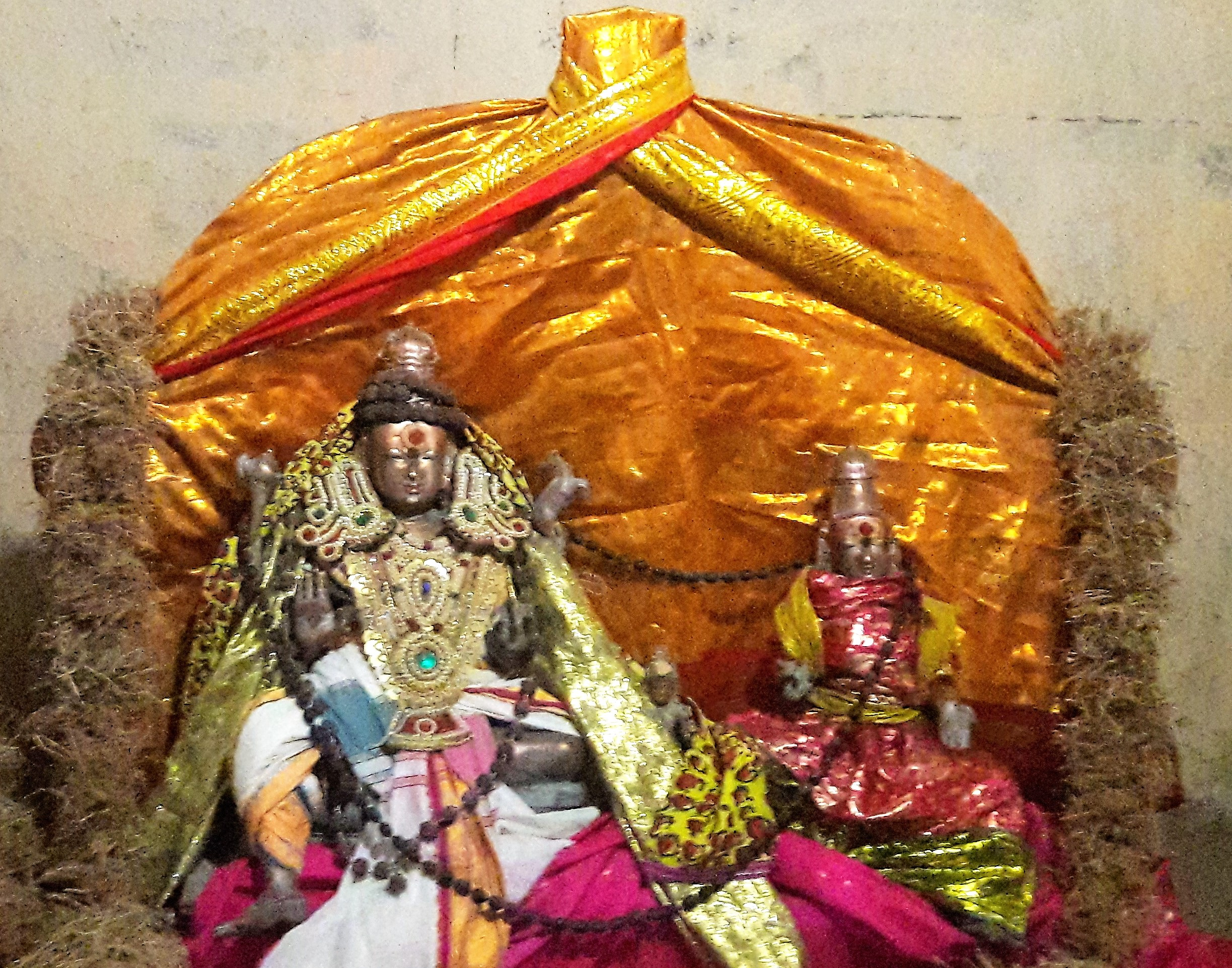
Festive image of the temple

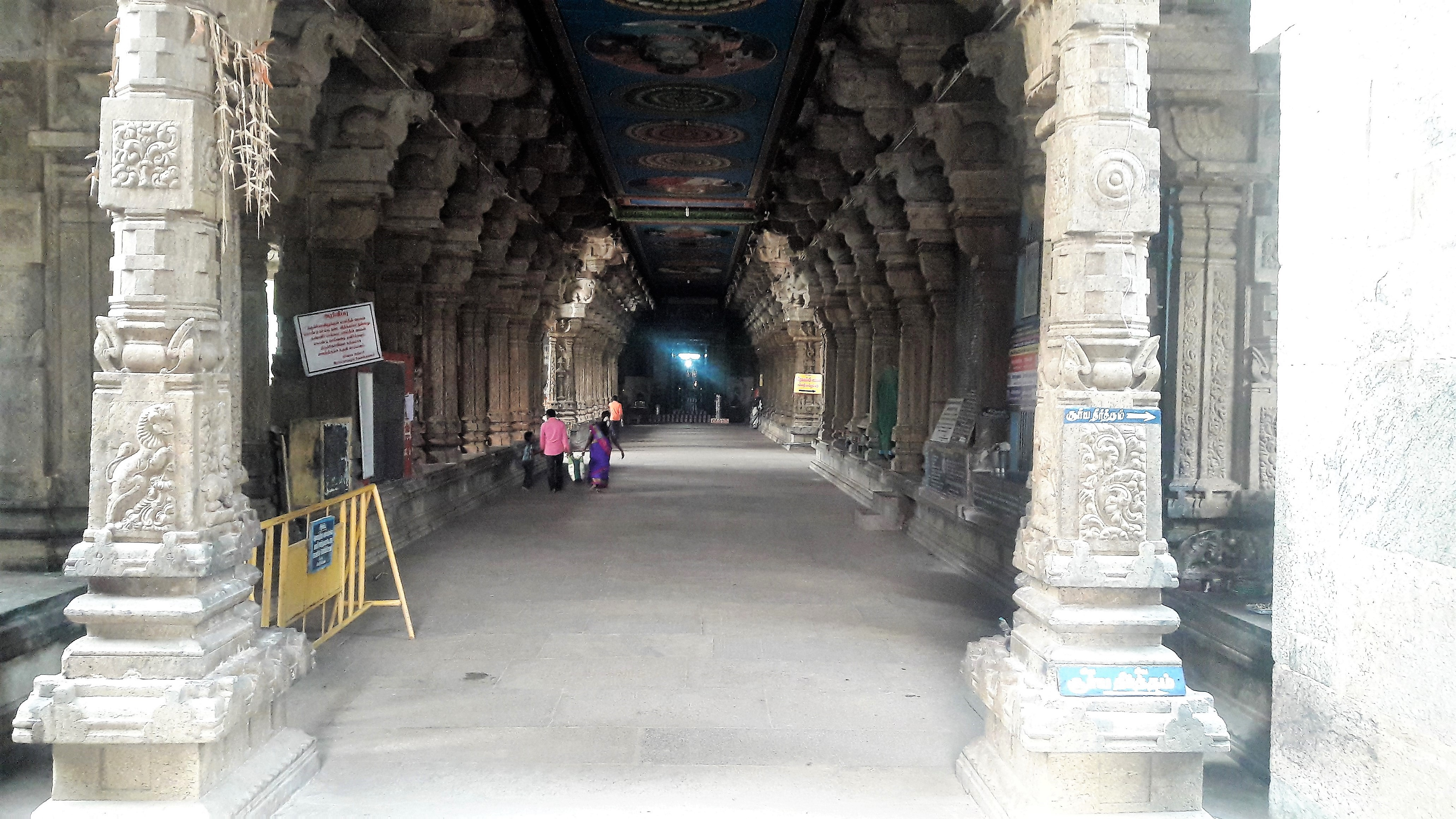
Pillared halls of the temple

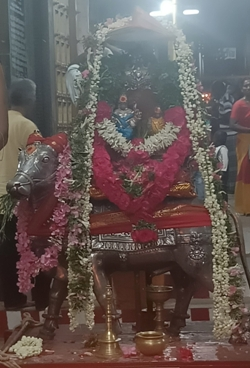
Deity in procession

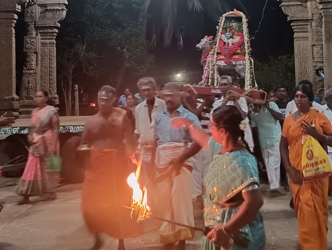
Processional deity going around the prakara
