= Vedalai =

Vedalai is a village in Ramanathapuram district, Tamil Nadu state in southern India.

== Geography ==
Vedalai is bordered by the Paak River to the north and Gulf of Mannar to the south. Sundaramudaiyan (S.Madai) village lies to the west and Maraikkayar Pattinam to the east. Vedalai is 13 km^{2}(approx) in size. It lies in 9.26' Latitude and 79.11' Longitude.

In south of the Gulf of Mannar there are two islands lies between 2 km from Vedalai. This islands have many extinct species and rare living organisms so it is declared as a reserved area called "Gulf of Mannar National Park" and carefully monitored by the Forest Department.

Pillaimadam is near Vedalai.

== Economy ==
Many years ago, fishing was the main source of income in Vedalai. In recent years, however, people are going to the Gulf countries to make money.

Seafood export and seafood preserving also contribute to the income of the people.

== Education ==
=== Private schools ===
- Infant Jesus Matriculation School
- Al Ameen Nursery and Primary school
- Sethu Vidyalaya
- Raja Matriculation Higher Secondary School and Arts College

=== Government school ===
- Elementary and Govt Higher secondary school.
