= Athiyuthu =

- village
- Location in Tamil Nadu, India Athiyuthu (India)
- Coordinates: 9°25′40″N 78°54′15″E
- Country: India
- State: Tamil Nadu
- District: Ramanathapuram

Languages
  - Official: Tamil
- Time zone: UTC+5:30 (IST)
- PIN: 623513
- Telephone code: 04567
- Nearest city: Ramanathapuram
- Lok Sabha constituency: Ramanathapuram
- Vidhan Sabha constituency: Tiruvadanai

Athiyuthu is a village located 17 km(10 Miles) from the center of Ramanathapuram district, Tamil Nadu, India. It has some similar places nearby, such as Chittarkottai, Panaikulam, Pudhuvalasai Alagankulam and Aatrangarai.

== Panchayat ==
Athiyuthu is a village panchayat for three villages namely Athiyuthu, Kovilkarai and Iraniyanvalasai which has 9 wards.

== Demography ==
Muslims are the majority community in this village, and are served by the Athiyuthu Jamiya Masjid mosque. There is also an Islamic pilgrimage center Pattani Shahib Dargah. This region is notable because Dalits began converting en-masse to Islam.

Two major areas for Muslims namely Athiyuthu Palaya Theru Jamaliya Muslim valibar sangam (JMVS) and Ramzan nagar vahidhiya Muslim valibar sangam (VMVS) which are controlled by Athiyuthu Muslim Jamath and Ramzan Nagar Muslim Jamath respectively.

For Hindus, Idayar Theru, Colony and many more areas. A temple named Bagavathy Amman Temple is also in the area, as are temples like Vinayagar temple, Muneeswarar temple, and Visalatchi temple.

== Education ==
Many educational Institutions like Syed Ammal Matriculation School, Syed Ammal Hr. Sec. School, Naziya Matriculation School, Mohamedia Hr. Sec.School, Bukhariya Matriculation School, Velumanickam Matriculation school, MG Public Matriculation School, Bahurdeen Hr.Sec. School, Krishna International school, Shifan Global Academy are some of the schools here and Syed Ammal Arts and Science college, Syed Hameedha Arts and Science College, Thasim Beevi Abdul Kadher College for Women, Syed Ammal Engineering College, Mohamed Sathak Engineering College, Mohamed Sathak Polytechnic College are the colleges here.

== Economy ==
Athiyuthu is an Agricultural-based village in which half of the land areas in it are agricultural lands. The people had cultivated many varieties of crops but now only Paddy due to the climatic changes and many people had sold their lands. Most of the people had been moved to Malaysia, Singapore and so on.

== Bus routes ==
There are state buses connecting to Ramanathapuram running every hour. Private buses connect the city with Chennai and Rameshwaram, visiting Athiyuthu.
