= Keelathooval =

Village in Tamil Nadu

Keelakthooval
- Location in Tamil Nadu, India
- 9.45°N 78.554°E
- Location: Ramnad, India

Keelathooval is a village in Ramanathapuram district, Tamil Nadu, India. As of 2011, it had a population of 3900 in 994 households.
