= Melakkal Kanavai =

Village in Tamil Nadu, India

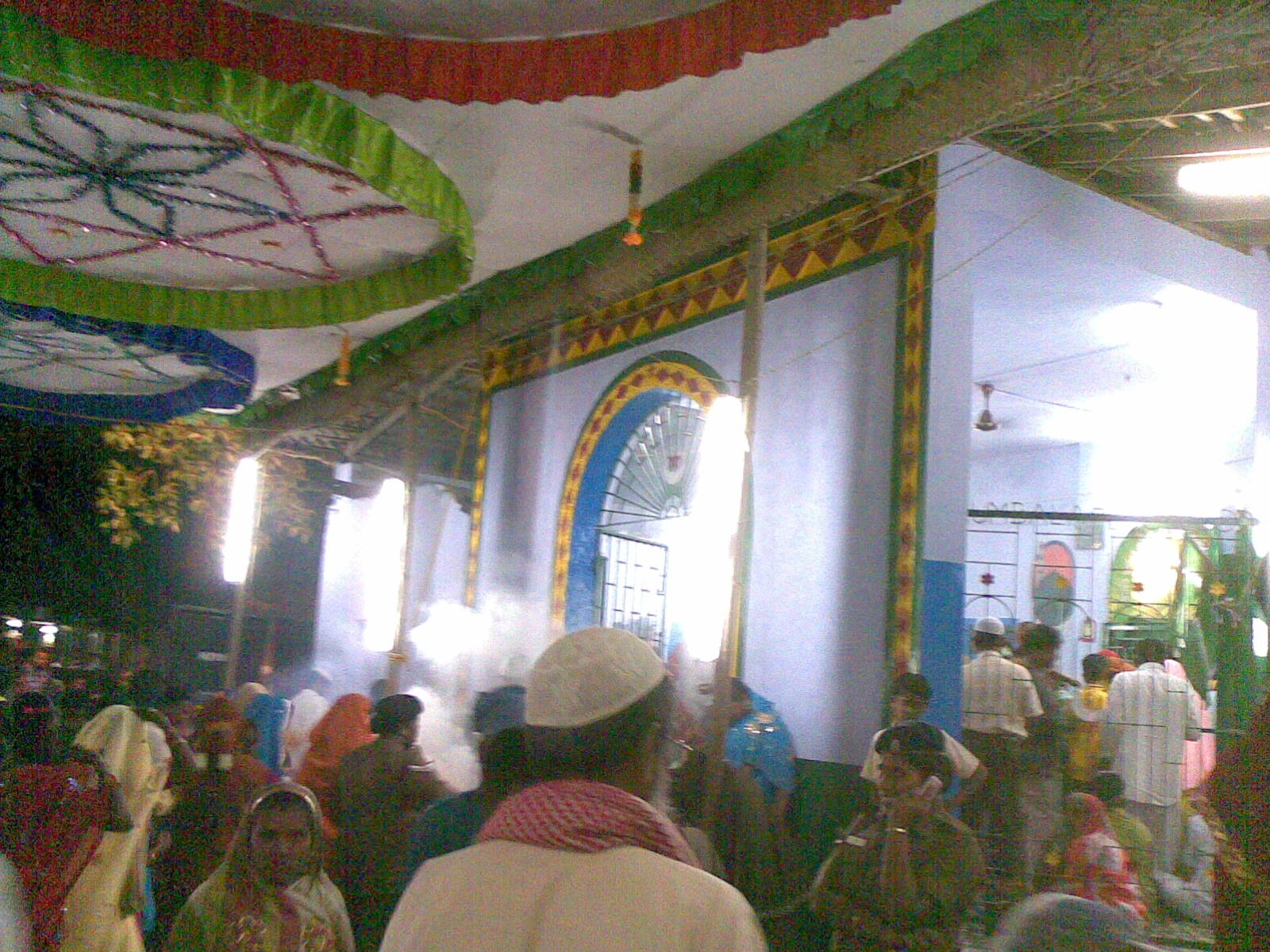
Dargah of Varushai Syed Ibrahim waliyullah on the night of urus, Kanavai, Melakkal, Madurai

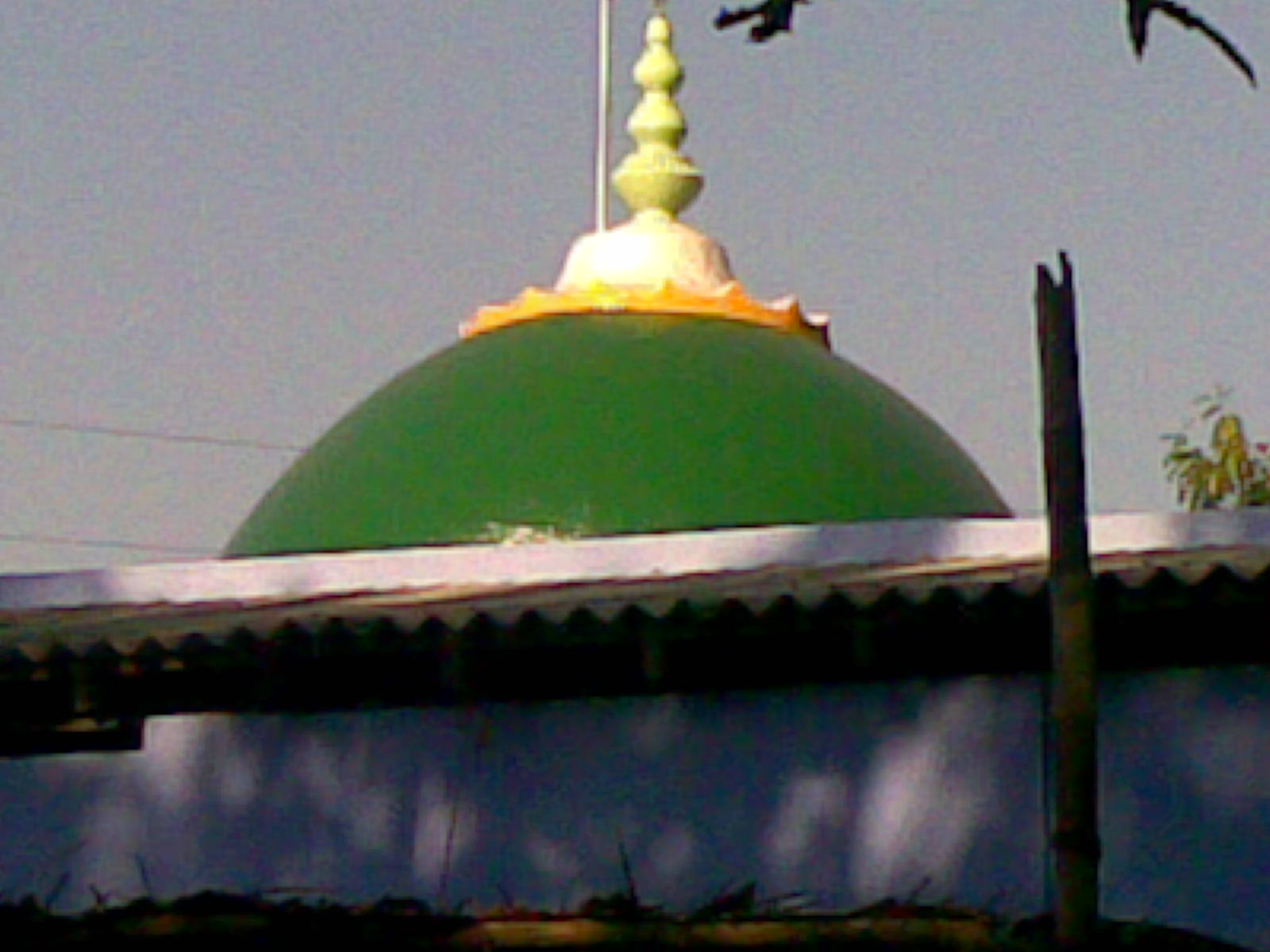
Tomb of the Dargah of Varushai Syed Ibrahim waliyullah, Kanavai, Melakkal, Madurai

Melakkal is a village in Madurai district, Tamil Nadu, India, where the grave of Varushai Syed Ibrahim Waliullah is found.

== Demographics ==
Melakkal is a village surrounded by Nagamalai hills in the north, Vaigai river in the south.

== Kanavai Dargha ==
Varushai Syed Ibraheem Shaheed Waliullah is the descendant of Sulthan Syed Ibrahim Shahhed Badusha Nayagam of Erwadi. He is the grandfather of Mursal Ibrahim Shaheed, whose dargah is located in Thachu oorani near Mayakulam, between Kilakkarai and Ervadi in the East Coast Road. Thus he is the great-grandfather of Nalla Ibrahim Waliyullah whose is the forefather of all the levvai mujavirs (huqdhars) of Erwadi dargah. The dargah of Nalla Ibrahim (who is actually named Muhammad Ibraim) is located Erwadi main dargah campus.
