= Pillaimadam =

Coordinates: 8°30′N 77°34′E

Pillaimadam is a village of Ramanathapuram district, Tamil Nadu state in India. The two place is important of Pillaimadam one of the nearest of vegetables garden and another place is nearest Ariyaman beach. Gulf of Mannar area is a Pillaimadam. Pillaimadam is nearest to Vedalai. Sundaramudaiyan post -623519 Ramanathapuram district, Tamil Nadu state, India.
