= Meesal Kilavaneri =

Village in Ramanathapuram district, Tamil Nadu, India

Meesal மீசல் Meesal Kilavaneri
- Village
- Location in Tamil Nadu, India Meesal (India)
- Coordinates: 9.33°N 78.45°E
- Country: India
- State: Tamil Nadu
- District: Ramanathapuram district
- Taluk: Mudukulathur

Government
  - Body: Prabakkalur Panchayat
- Elevation: 27 m (89 ft)

Population (2021 estimate)
  - Total: 2,846

Languages
  - Official: Tamil (தமிழ்)
- Time zone: UTC+5:30 (IST)
- PIN: 623 712
- Telephone code: 04576
- Vehicle registration: TN-65

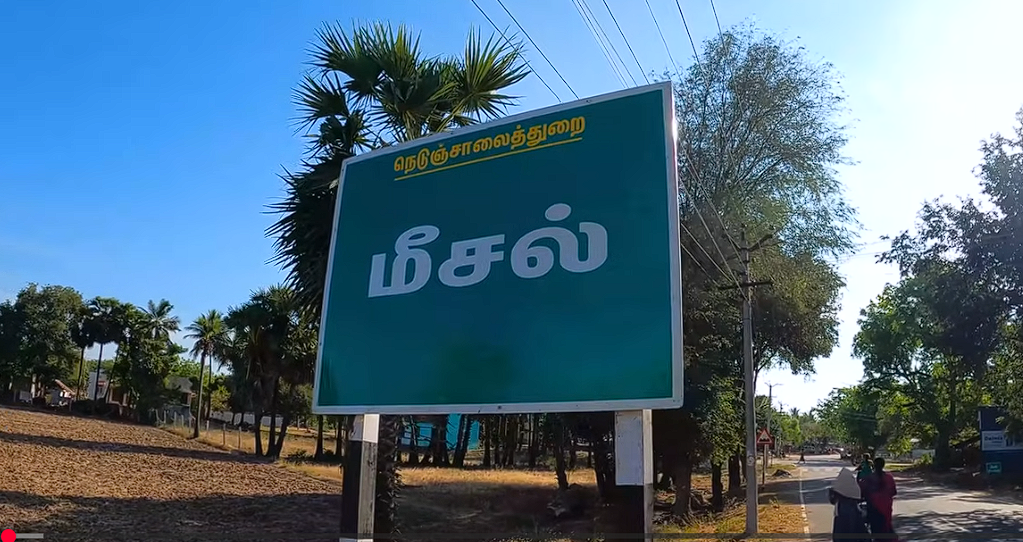
Meesal Village Entrance Signboard

Meesal (Tamil: மீசல்), also known as Meesal Kilavaneri (மீசல் கிலவநேரி), is a village in the Mudukulathur taluk of Ramanathapuram district in the southern Indian state of Tamil Nadu. The settlement is known for its history of religious coexistence and its association with Tamil Muslim scholarship.

== History ==
Meesal is among the older rural settlements of the Mudukulathur region, believed to have developed during the late period of the Ramanathapuram kingdom. Local oral traditions link the village with the travels of early Muslim preachers associated with Sultan Syed Ibrahim Shaheed of Erwadi in the twelfth century CE. Among them was Umar Khattab Shaheed, whose tomb remains a local pilgrimage site. Over later centuries, Meesal developed as a modest centre of Tamil-Islamic teaching and literary activity.

== Geography ==
Meesal lies about 20 km west of Ramanathapuram and approximately 5 km south of Mudukulathur. It falls under the Prabakkalur Panchayat and has the postal code 623 712. The terrain consists of dry plains with agriculture as the principal occupation. The village is connected by district roads linking Ramanathapuram, Paramakudi, and nearby towns.

== Demographics ==
Tamil is the predominant language spoken. The population comprises Hindu, Muslim, and Christian communities living in close proximity. Agriculture, education, and small-scale trade are the main sources of livelihood.

== Religious and cultural sites ==
- Umar Khattab Shaheed Dargah – a local shrine associated with early Islamic missionaries of southern Tamil Nadu.
- Masjid Taqwa Meesal – the principal mosque and community prayer centre.
- Several Hindu temples, including Kannan, Vinayagar, Ayyanar, and Amman temples, host annual village festivals attended by residents of all faiths.
- A small Christian congregation maintains a local church, reflecting the area’s multi-religious character.

== Education and healthcare ==
The village has a Government Primary and Middle School serving Meesal and neighbouring hamlets. Basic health services are provided by a Primary Health Centre operated under the Ramanathapuram District Health Department.

== Religious education ==
An Islamic madrasah in Meesal offers instruction in Qurʾānic recitation, Hadith, Fiqh, and Arabic language. Established through community funding, it conducts evening classes and special programmes during Ramadan.

== Community and events ==
Residents organise an annual Mawlid (Meelad Sharif) commemorating the birth of Prophet Muhammad, which includes religious recitations and communal meals. Local youth groups also conduct social-welfare and literacy drives.

== Notable people ==
- Vannak-kaḷañciyap Pulavar (Muhammad Ibrahim) – Tamil Muslim poet from Meesal, known for the works Irāja Nāyakam and Dīn Purāṇam.

== See also ==
- Ramanathapuram district
- Erwadi
- Tamil Muslim literature
