= Maraikayar Pattinam =

Town in Tamil Nadu, India

Maraikayar Pattinam is a town located 33 km from Ramanathapuram, Tamil Nadu, India, located between the Bay of Bengal and the Indian Ocean.

The residents here are called Maraikayars, after a local style of wooden ships known as marakkalams. Cricket is the most popular sport.
