= Vaippar =

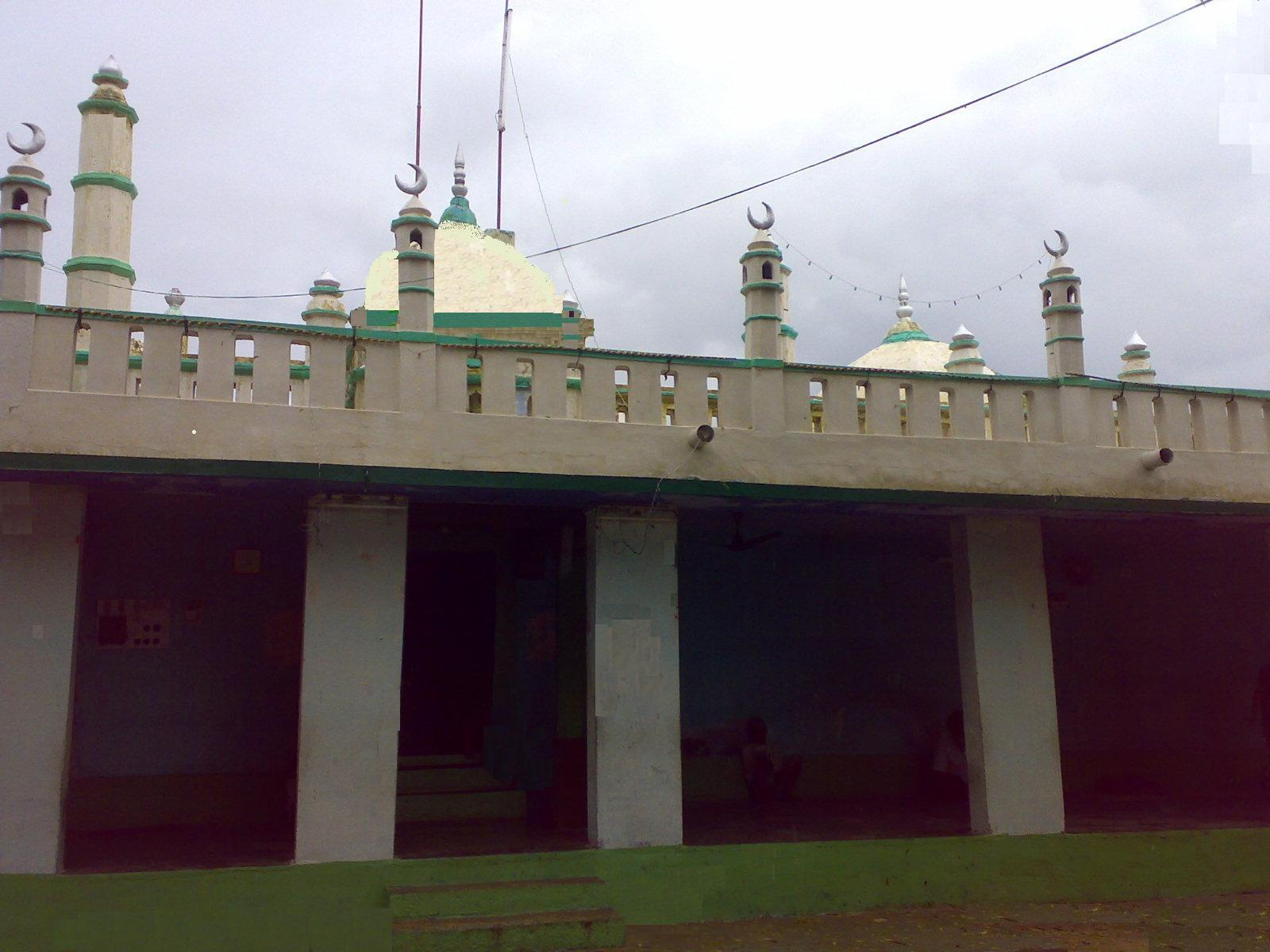
Dargah of Shamsuddeen Shaheed, Vaippar

Vaippar is a village panchayat in Tuticorin district, Tamil Nadu, India. It is the location of a famous dargah, the grave of Shamsuddeen Shaheed, who was a minister of Badusha Sulthan Syed Ibrahim Shaheed of Erwadi.
