= Karseri =

Neighbourhood in Madurai district, Tamil Nadu, India

Coordinates: 9.8735°N 78.2166667°E

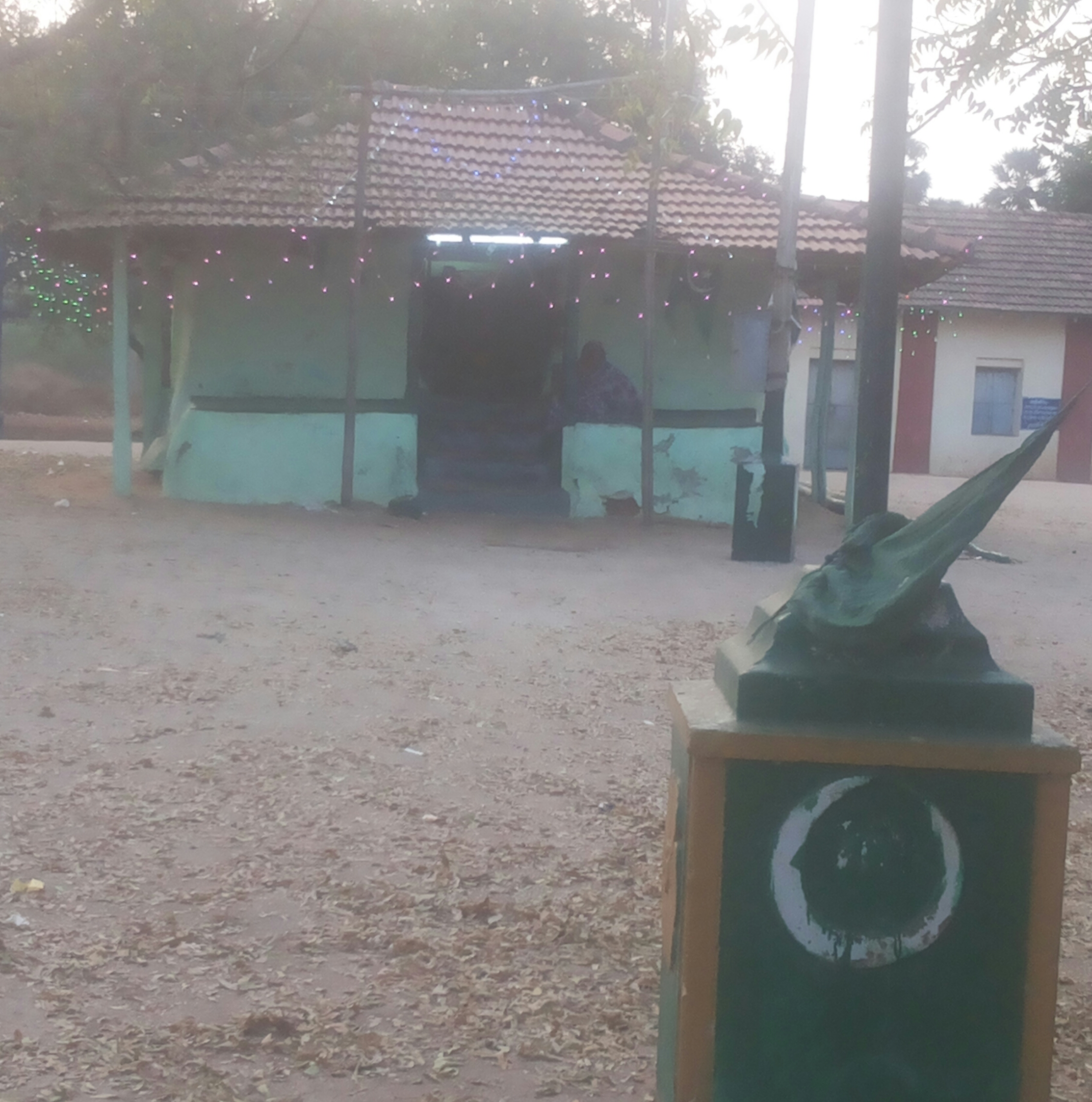
Dargah of Syed Ibrahim Shaheed, Karseri on the night of Urs

Karseri is a small village near Sakkimangalam in the Madurai West union of Madurai District, India. It is a small village, famous for the grave of Syed Ibrahim Shaheed who was a soldier in the army of Qutb Sulthan Syed Ibrahim Shaheed of Erwadi and Sulthan Sikandhar Badusha of Thiruparankundram in Madurai. The anniversary of his death (urs) at his dargah (shrine) is commemorated on the 15th night of the Islamic month of Jumada al-Awwal.
