= Pallichandai Silaiman =

Village in Tamil Nadu, India

Coordinates: 9.8606954°N 78.1900895°E

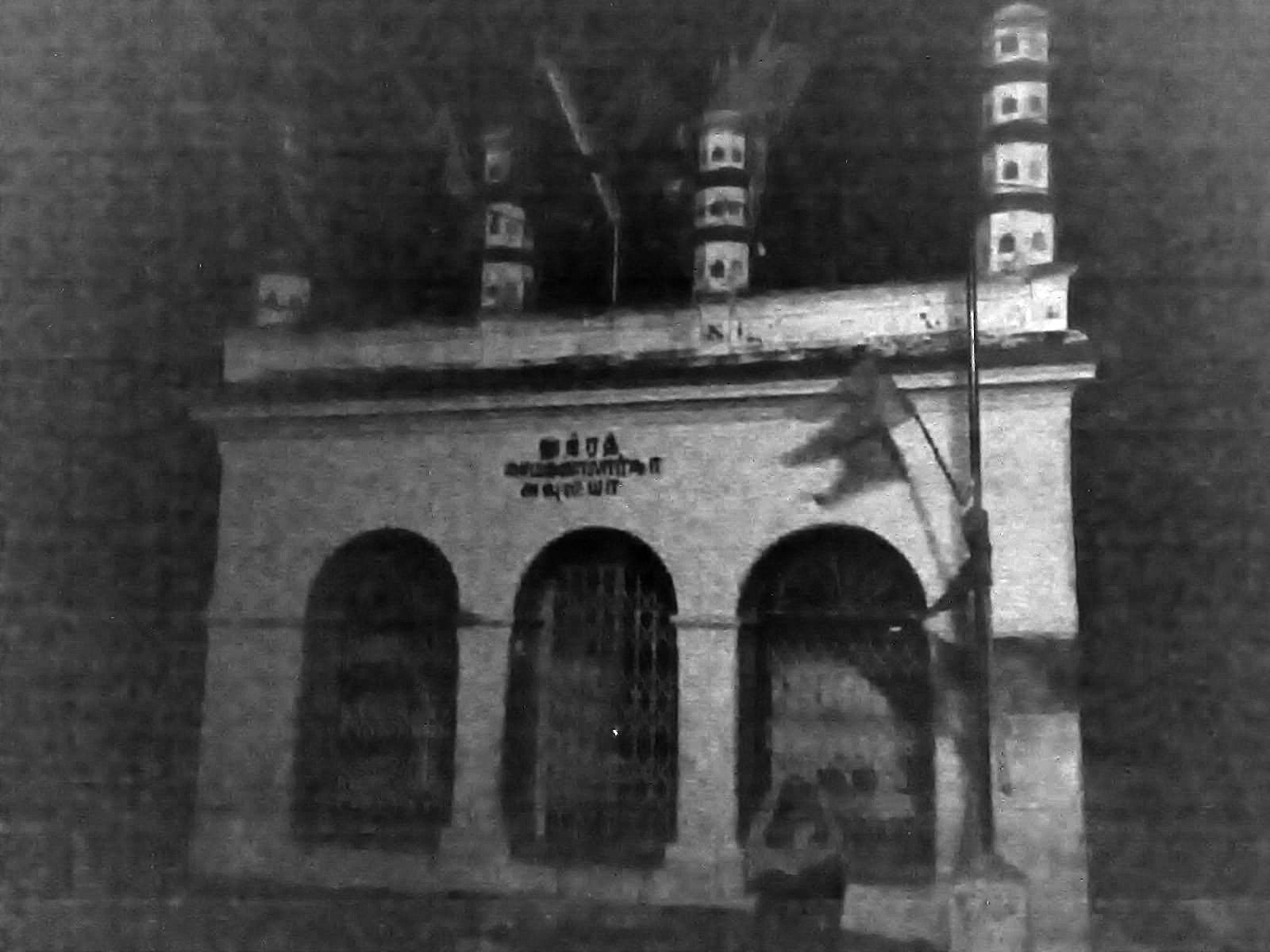
Dargah of Syed Salaar Sha Shaheed, Palli chandhai, Madurai

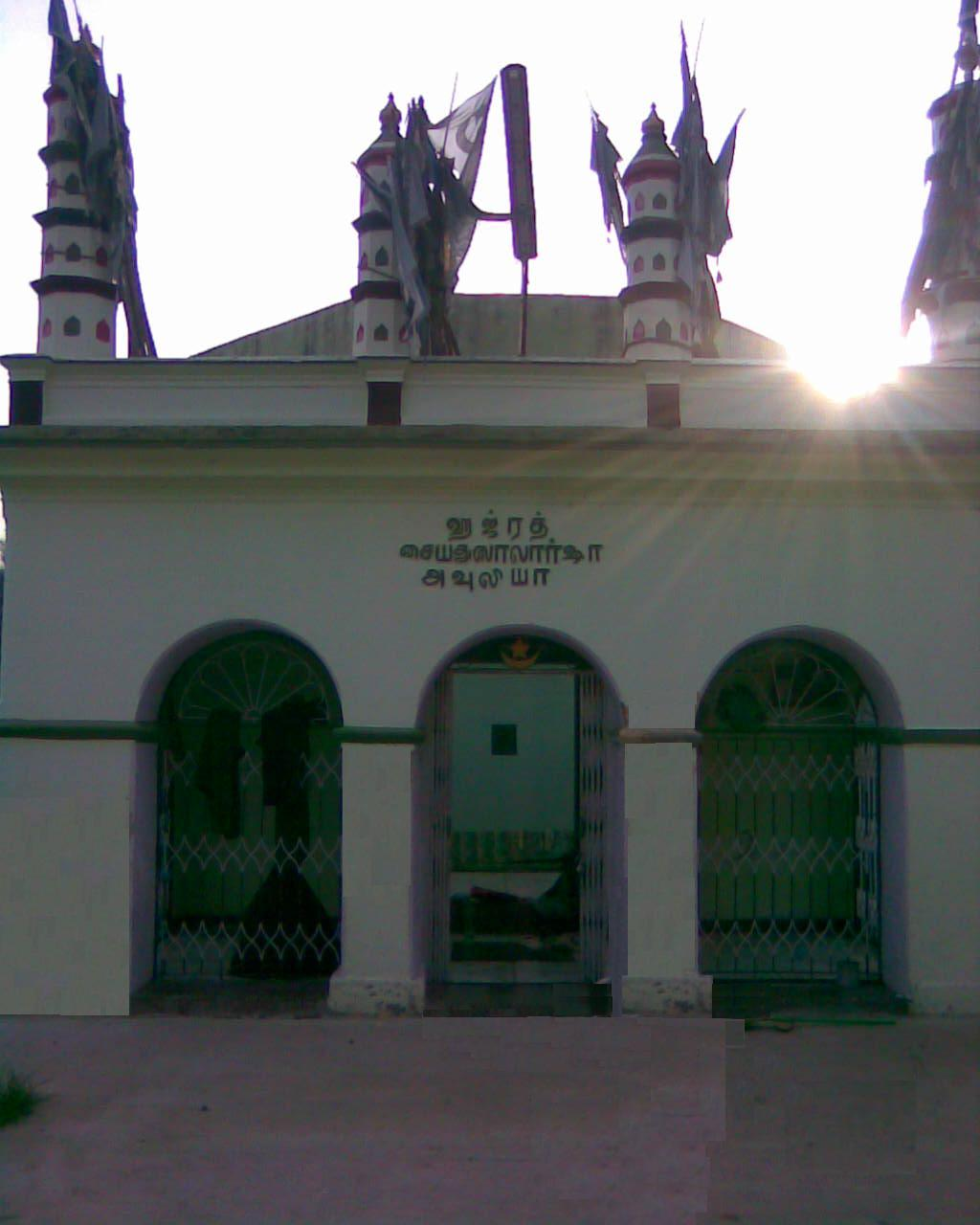
Front view of the Dargah of Syed Salaar Sha Shaheed, Palli chandhai, Madurai

Palli Chandai is a small village near Keeladi the famous archeological site of Tamil Nadu on the border of Madurai and Sivaganga districts. The grave of Saalaar Shah Shaheed who was a soldier in the army of Qutb Sulthan Syed Ibrahim Shaheed of Erwadi and Sulthan Sikandhar Badusha of Thiruparankundram in Madurai is located here. The anniversary Urus festival of this dargah is commemorated in the Islamic month of Safar. The mosque and dargah are renovated by local Muslims.
