= Alagankulam =

Alagankulam Alagai
- Village Panchayat
- Location in Tamil Nadu, India Alagankulam (India)
- Coordinates: 9.354722222°N 78.96916667°E
- Country: India
- State: Tamil Nadu
- District: Ramanathapuram

Government
  - Type: Panchayati raj (India)
  - Body: Gram panchayat
  - Councillor: Sabiya Rani R
  - President: [VALLI பா.வள்ளி ]
- Elevation: 4 m (13 ft)

Population (2011)
  - Total: 15,473

Languages
  - Official: Tamil
- Time zone: UTC+5:30 (IST)
- PIN: 623512
- Telephone code: 04567
- Vehicle registration: TN 65
- Website: www.alagankulam.com

Alagankulam is a village situated on the east coast in the Ramanathapuram taluk and district in India. The village is situated on the banks of the Vaigai River and is about 3 kilometres (1.9 mi) away from the seashore. The village is located 18 kilometres (11 mi) east of Ramanathapuram. The village had a population of 15,473 at the 2011 census.

The carbon dating report of the artefacts excavated from Azhagankulam revealed that they dated to 345 BC. With the artefacts having Tamil inscriptions, this could prove that Tamil was older than Prakrit which is dated to be from 268 BC to 232 BC.

== Tourism ==
The village is situated on the banks of the river Vaigai and is about three kilometers from the seashore.

The most significant findings of the excavation are hundreds of potsherds of the Mediterranean region. They include Rouletted ware and Amphorae jar pieces. Pieces of Red ware with Tamil Brahmi letters have been found. They are assignable to the first century BCE. Other antiquities include beads, perforated tiles, and bricks in various levels.

Three Roman coins were unearthed. They contain the figure of the head of the Roman Emperor on one side and the figure of goddess of victory, holding a globe on the other side. The legend on them shows that the Roman Emperor Valentine II who ruled around 375 CE issued the coins. Undersea exploration work was also conducted at Poompuhar in 1996–1997 in collaboration with National Institute of Oceanography, Goa. Lead ingots were obtained in the search.

Alagankulam is close to Rameswaram and Devipattinam, both important pilgrimage centres. Alagankulam beach is popular in this village.

== Demographics ==
The Alagankulam village has a population of 15,473 with a sex ratio of 1067 which is higher than the Tamil Nadu state average of 996. There are 1,730 children aged between 0 and 6 (11.18% of total population). Scheduled Castes and Scheduled Tribes accounted for 3.28% and 0.02% of the population respectively. The village had 3,259 households. There were a total of 4370 workers. The literacy rate is 86.63% - 89.60% for males, and 83.85% for females.

== Geography ==
The nearest towns include Ramanathapuram and Rameswaram.

== Transport ==
The village is located in southeast Tamil Nadu and connected by NH-49 to Madurai and Ramanathapuram from Rameswaram.

The nearest airport is Madurai Airport, which is located about 145 kilometres (90 mi) away from the village.
