= Jegaatha =

Tamil writer

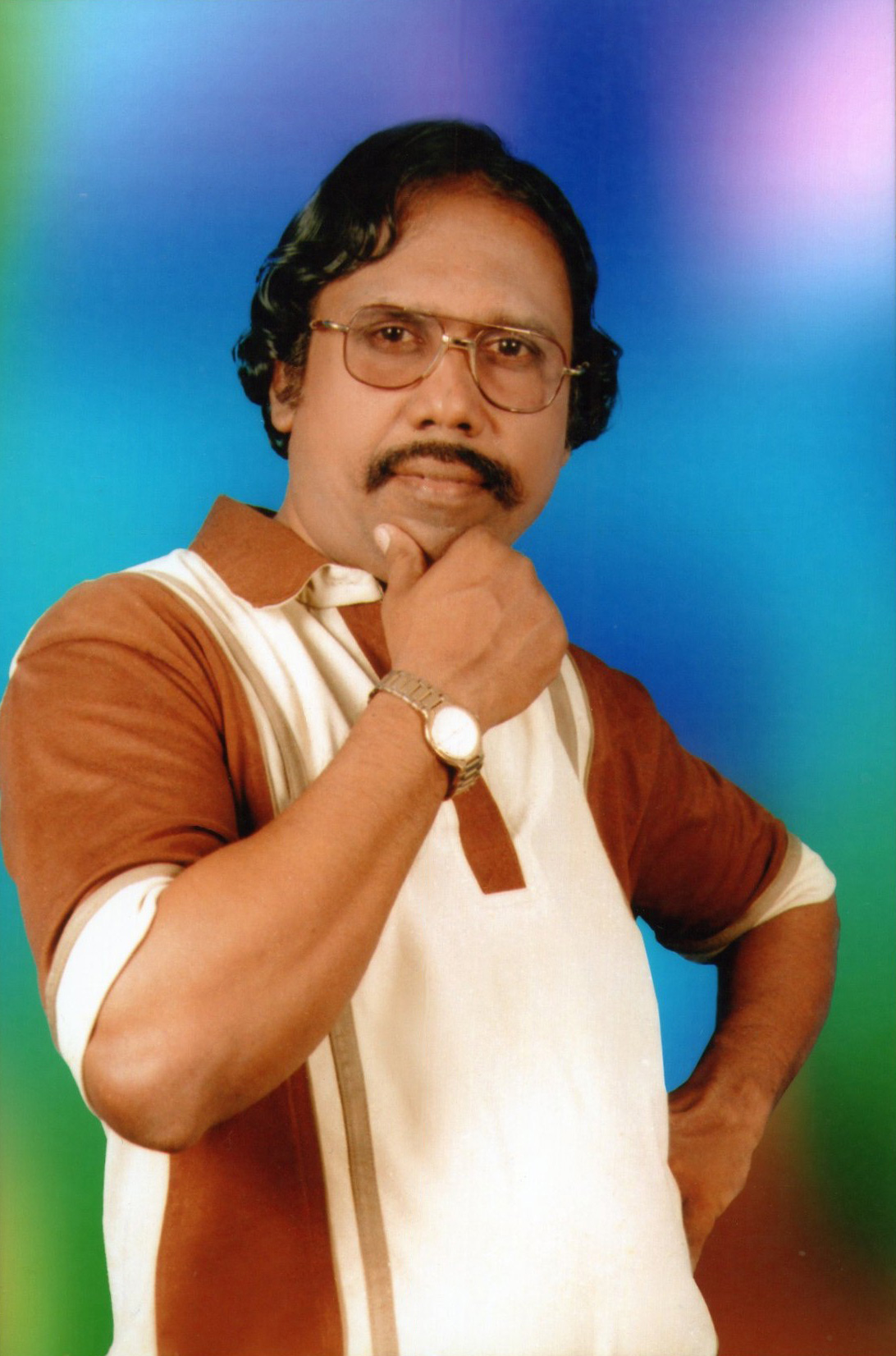
- Born: 3 January 1956 (age 70); Ramanathapuram, Tamil Nadu, India
- Occupation: Writer

Jegaatha (born 3 January 1956) is a famous Tamil author of over 500 short stories, 30 small novels, 10 novels, 100 poems and more than 300 books on various titles. He has also contributed more than 44 Tamil periodicides, ceylon periodicals, Internet periodicals and radio broadcasts.

== Creative works ==
=== Short story collections ===
Name of the book	Publications
Jegaadha sirukadaihal	Sri Shenbaha Publications
Mister Parliament	NCBH
Velviyil mulaitha vidhaigal	Kavitha Publications
Maangalyam Thandunaney	Manimehalai Pirasuram
Viradaparuvam	Poovalaghi Pathippaham
Iravu nerathu maudihal	Annam Pathippaham
Thoondil meen	Agni Pathippaham
Paalmaram	Nakkiran Pathippaham
Kadhal Thaganam	Agni Pathippaham
Girama devadhaigal	Sri Shenbaha Publications
Kalathai vendra Nanneri kadhaigal	Tamilan Pathippaham
Gurushethram koorum kadhaihal	Ilakkumi Nilayam
Suvadigal koorum suvayana kadhaihal	Arivu Nilayam
Ammavukku magan sonna ariviyal kadhaihal	Tamilan Nilayam
Kaviyam kanda Nayagiyar kadhaihal	RR Nilayam
Panbai valarkkum anbu neri kadhaihal	Arunodhayam
Kadhavai thirakkum vingnana kadhaihal	Sri Vignesh Pathipaham
Sindhaikkinia sethunattu kadhaihal	Visalam Pathipagam
Amma sonna rishigalin kadhaihal	Sura Pathipaham
Needhi podhikkum gnaniyar kadhaihal	Anbu Nilayam
Kaapiya kadhaihal	Baagambiriyal Pathipaham
Sigaram kanda amarar sirukadaihal	Sri Shenbaha Pathippagam
Viyakkavaitha vinghaniyar kadaihal	Vinayaga Pathippagam
Siddhar marabu kathaihal	Sri Shenbaha Pathippagam
Buddha leelayum murpiravi kadhaihalum	Dhanalaxmi Pathippaham
Dhisai Kaattum Kadhaihal	Arunodhayum
Nanneri pugattum Nayanmaar Kadhaigal	Bagambiriyal Pathippagam
Padhumaigalum paati vikra madhithan kadhaihalum	Sri Shenbaha Pathippaham
Nadhihal koorum Kadhaihal	Arivu Nilayam
Bharatha panbaattu kadhaihal	Sai Surya Enterprise

=== Small novel collections ===
Name of the book	Publications
Kadhalahi kasinthu	Manimegalai Pirasuram
Karaiyyan putredukka	Moovendhar Pathippagam
Gobiyar konjum ramana	Nakkiran Pathippagam
Sinnanjiru Kiliye	Annam Pathippagam
Karumainiram thondru thadi	Nakkiran Pathippagam

=== Novels ===
Name of the book	Publications
Samudhira kumaararhal	Annam Pathippaham
Thwaiba	Sri Shenbaha Pathippaham
Anda Bagiranda Adharvana Siddharhal	Nakkirran Pathippaham
Viduthalai Vengai	Sri Shenbaga Pathippaham
Jenni Jenni	KaalaiPoonga
Rishi Kamam	Udhayam
Ragam Thedum Kavidhaihal	Saandror murasu
Oru Nayil nadhi	Maniyan
Karunai vayal	Agni

=== Poetry ===
Name of the book	Publications
Narasimma Vadham	Annam publications

=== Tamil periodical contributions ===
Name of the book	Publications
Aaranya kandathu arundhadhihal	Om Saravana bhava
Kaadhalahi kasindhu	Idhayam Pesugirathu
Irava varam petra Indiya siddharhal	Om Saravana bhava
Kadavulai kaadhalitha kanniyar	Om Saravana bhava
Atshaya Kavitha aanmiga gurumaarhal	Bala jodhidam
Sinnanjiru kiliye	Thayin manikkodi
Karayan Putredukka	Maniyan
Gnana siddharhalin Attama Siddhihal	Om Saravana bhava
Oru Nayil Nadhi	Saravanas stores
Thvaiba	Gopura deepam
Ingu Karpu parisodhikkapadum	Maniyan
Siddhargalin Arpudha Siddhigal	Om Saravana bhava
Closeup murder	Kunguma Chimizh
Grama devadaihal	Om Saravana bhava
Anda Bhagiranda adharvana Siddharga	Om Saravana bhava
Ushar pengaley ushar	Thanikkai malar
Mukkalam vendravargalin andha mukhthi velai	Om Saravana bhava
You devil	Kaalai poonga
Natpukku niramillai	Agni

== Translation novels ==
Name of the book	Publications
Yama (Alexander Gubrin)	Iniya Udayam
Kalvadiyum Kadhal (Leo Tolstoy)	Iniya Udayam
Thimingala vettai (Herman Melvin)	Iniya Udayam
Rathakkatteri (Pram Stokker)	Iniya Udayam
Kalyana Kanavuhal (Jehn Austin)	Iniya Udayam
Yezhlai padum padu (Victor Hugo)	Iniya Udayam
Anna Karineena (Leo Tolstoy)	Iniya Udayam
Siddhartha (Herman Hessie)	Iniya Udayam
Ulagappugal petra Piramoli Naavalhal	Kathir veliyeedu

== Fictions on various titles ==
=== Drama ===
Name of the book	Publications
Melainaattu medai Naadahangal	Sri Shenbaha Pathipaham
Indiya Nadahamedayil kodikatti paranthavarhal	Kavitha publications
Viduthalai velviyil naadaha kalai	RR Nilayam
Medayai maatriya Naadaha kathaihal	Ramprasanth Publications
Ulahai ulukkiya thigil naadahangal	Charu Prabha Publications
Indiya mozhihalin arithaana medaihal	Raaja manikkamal publications

=== Music ===
Name of the book	Publications
Bharatha Ratna M.S.Subhulakshmi Isaikkaviyam	Sri Shenbaha Pathipaham

=== Cinema ===
Name of the book	Publications
Kaalathai vendra thiraipadakkalai	Sri Shenbaha Pathipaham
Puhal petra 100 cinema kalaingarhal	Shankara Pathippaham
Irupatham nootrandin Indiya Cinema	Saruprabha Publications

=== History ===
Name of the book	Publications
Kaalam pala kanda Hider ali	Saru prabha publications
Adimai vilangoditha Indiya Pennarasihal	Saru prabha publications
Veerathin Adaiyalam Maratiya Sivaji	Raja maanikkamal publications
Hitlarin Andharanga Kaadhali	Ramprasanth
Viyakkathakka Ulaga naayagargal	Tamilan Nilayam
Ulaha viduthalai poraaligalin sirai kurrippuhal	Arivu nilayam
Pennarasigalin veera varalaru	Ilakkumi Nilayam
Ulagai ulukkum varalaatru nihalvuhal	Tamil nilayam
Sarithiram padaitha saadhanaiyaalarhal	Sethu Alami
Indiavil kumbeniyar kalam	Sri Shenbaha Publications
Ulaha puratchiyargalin kadhaihal	Arivu nilayam
Pughal petra India varalatru kadhaihal	Dhanalaxmi Publications
Saadhanai chithiram Nelson mandela	Arivu nilayam
Irumbu manithan stalin	Arivu nilayam
Nepolean Bonapart	Sri Shenbaha Publications
Naayakka mannargalum sethupathihalum	Arivu nilayam
Hitlarin yutha kalangal	Arivu nilayam
Tippu sultan oru thigaipootum varalatru paarvai	Anbu Illam

=== Theology ===
Name of the book	Publications
Mahaveerar vaalvum vaakum	Sri Shenbaga Publications
Olikkadavul Vallalar	Priya Nilayam
Naanilam potrum nabigal naayagam	Sri Shenbaga Publications
Paandu rangan bhaktha leelai	Sri Shenbaga Publications
Sri Raamanujar vaalvum vaakkum	Sri Shenbaga Publications
Krishna Kaaviyam - Aaayar Paadiyilirunthu Amaraapuri varai	Raja Manikkamal Publications
Bhudhanin mun jenmam	Ram Prasanth Publications
aadhi Shankarar	Saru Prabha Publications
Karuviley uruvaana Gurunaanak	Saru Prabha Publications
Sri Rahavendirar	Saru Prabha Publications
Sriadi sai baba	Saru Prabha Publications
Vallalar	Saru Prabha Publications
Harichandra kaaviyam	Ram Prasanth Publications
panniru aalwaarhal arul varalaaru	Ram Prasanth Publications
Bhudha kaaviyam	Saru Prabha Publications
Naayan maarhalin thiru kadhaihal	Ram Prasanth Publications
Paamban swamihalin vaalvum vaakkum	Sankar Pathippagam
Sathyavaan Saavithri	R.S.P. Publications
Mukkaalam vendravarhalin andha mukthi velai	R.S.P. Publications

=== Literature ===
Name of the book	Publications
Idayam thotta Islamiya ilakkiyam	Sri Shenbaha Publications
Mahaa kaviyin padhivuhal	Kavitha Publications
Thiru mangai azhlwar thiruvaayamudam	Kurinji Pathippaham
Aymberum Kaapiyangal	Ramprasanth Publications
Tamilil Imayam kanda 100 periyaarhal	Tamilan Nilayam
Varalaru koorum vattara ilakkiam	Priya Pathippaham
Marakka mudiyatha mangayar Thilahangal	Ramprasanth Publications

=== Epic ===
Name of the book	Publications
Mahabharatam	Nakkiran
Sundara Kaandam	Nakkiran
Ramayanam	Raja Manakiammal Publications
Idhayathai eramaakkum Idhikkasa kadhaihal	Nakkiran
Maanavarhalukkaana Ramayanam	Vignesh Pathippagam
Gurushetram koorum Kadhaihal	Ilakkumi Nilayam

=== Law ===
Name of the book	Publications
Pengalum Paadhugaappu sattangalum	Sri Shenbaga Pathippaham

=== Computer ===
Name of the book	Publications
Kanini oru kanavu desam	Arivu nilayam
Internet yenum iniya nanban	Ilakkumi Nilayam

=== Sports ===
Name of the book	Publications
Ulaga vilayaatu kalangiyum	Dhanalakshmi Pathippaham
Pugazhpetra 101 cricket veerarhal	Ilakkumi Nilayam

=== G.K ===
Name of the book	Publications
Sigarathai thotta sindhanaiyaalarhal	Vishalatshi Pathippaham
Kadhal Kalanjiyum	Ilakkumi Nilayam
Super Quiz box	Sri Shenbaha Publications
Pugal petra lol saadhanayaalarhal	Vishalatshi Pathippaham
Ulaha Thahaval kalanjiyum	Arunodhayam
Vedikkayaana Vidukathaihal	Arun pathippaham
Viyakkathakka Ulaha naayaharhal	Tamizhlan nilayam
Puhal petra 101 kattidangal	Ilakkumi Nilayam
Thakaval Arivvu kalanjiyum	dhanalakshmi Publications
Sindhanayai thoondum 1000 vidukathaihal	Ram Prasanth
3581 pazha molihal	Ram Prasanth
Arivu vettai super quiz 2652	Raaja maanikkamal
Ulahai maatrippotta vingnana kandupidippuhal	Ram Prasanth
vinnadi vinaakkal 3000	Arivu nilayam

=== Siddha ===
Name of the book	Publications
Siddhar kalanjium pagam -1	Sri Shenbaha Publications
Siddhar kalanjium pagam -2	Sri Shenbaha Publications
Siddhar sonna Nadi ragasiyangal	Ramprasantha Publications
Neengalum kooduvitta koodu paayalum	Ramprasantha Publications
Siddharhalin varmakkalai marmangal	Ramprasantha Publications
Irava varam petra India siddharhal	Rajamanikkamal Publications
Yendrum ilamaikku siddharhalin yoga vasiyangal	Ramprasantha Publications
Siddharhalin mandrea vasiya kurippuhal	Saruprabha Publications
Gnana siddharhalin attama siddhihal	Saruprabha Publications
Sivavakia siddhargalin valvum viyappum	Ramprasantha Publications
Siddhargal aruliya 200 mooligai ragasiyangal	Ramprasantha Publications
Siddharhal nihalthiya arpudangal	Saruprabha Publications
Anda bahiranda adharvana siddharhal	Saruprabha Publications
Makkalukkaai mutrum thurantha mahaa siddarhal	Saruprabha Publications
Siddhar paadalhal	Ramprasantha Publications
Maranathai vendra mahaa siddhar vallalar	R.S.P. Publications
Siddharhalin srishti ragasiyam	Sri Shenbaha Publications
Siddharhal kanda aavihalai virattum mooligai rahasiyangal	Rajamanikkamal Publications
Siddharhal kanda rasamani mooligai rahasiyangal	Rajamanikkamal Publications
Siddharhal kanda thanga mooligai ragasiyangal	Rajamanikkamal Publications
Aatkolli noyai adithu virattum yoga payirchihal	Ramprasantha Publications
Siddharhalin mandira thanthira kalaihal	Sri Shenbaha Publications
Sagala visakadikkum siranjeeva mooligaihal	Ramprasantha Publications
Narambu murukketrum aasana payirchi	R.S.P. Publications
Vaalvikka vantha siddharhal	Sri Shenbaha Publications
Siddharhal kanda vasiya mooligai rahasiyangal	Ramprasantha Publications
Siddharhal kanda kaaya kalpa mooligai rahasiyangal	Rajamanikkamal Publications
Siddharhal kanda mandira mooligai rahasiyangal	Rajamanikkamal Publications
Siruneeraha noi virattum aasana payirchihal	R.S.P. Publications
Siddharhal kanda pesum moolihaihal	Sri Shenbaha Publications
Sindhai allum siddhar arul molihal	Ramprasantha Publications
Siddharhal kanda pudaiyal mooligai rahasiyangal	Rajamanikkamal Publications
Siddharhal kanda arokkia azhagu tharum mooligai rahasiyangal	Rajamanikkamal Publications
Moola noi virattum murayaana aasangal	Ramprasantha Publications
Illarathirkku pinnum ilamayai irukka yelia yogaasanangal	R.S.P. Publications
Siddharhal kanda deiveeha mooligai rahasiyangal	Rajamanikkamal Publications
Mudhuguvaliya?Moottuvaliya?Iduppuvaliya? Yogaasanam payilvom	Rajamanikkamal Publications
Padhinen Siddharhalin varalaru	R.R. Nilayam
Arokkia vaalvukku 55 aasanangal	Karpagam Pudhagalyam
Siddhar Gnana ragasiyam	Visalatchi Pathippagam
Siddhar kanda yoga mooligai Sakkarai noy neenga	Sankar Pathippagam
Siddharhalin yoga neri	Senthamil Pathippaham
Ungal thottathil uyir kaakkum mooligai	Visalatchi Pathippagam
Siddharhal aruliya siranjeevi maruthuvam	Sri Shenbaha Publications
Moolanoy neenga siddhar kanda yogaa matrum mooligai	Sankar Pathippagam
Pattinathu siddhar vaalvum vaakkum	Sri Shenbaha Publications
Kan, Kaadhu noy neenga siddhar kanda yoga matrum mooligai	Sankar Pathippagam
Siruneeraga noy neenga siddhar kanda yoga matrum mooligai	Sankar Pathippagam
Rathakothippu Idaya noyhal neenga siddhar kanda yoga	Sankar Pathippagam
Yendrum ilamayudan irukka siddhar kanda yoga matrum mooligai	Sankar Pathippagam
Koodu vittu koodu paayum kalai	R.R.Nilayam
Ashthma, suvasakkolar neenga siddhar kanda yoga matrum mooligai	Sankar Pathippagam
Narambu thalarchi neenga siddhar kanda yoga matrum mooligai	Sankar Pathippagam
Siddhar marabukkathihal	Sri Shenbaha Publications
Parasakthi Agathiyarukku arulia mandhira jodhi	Rajamanikkamal Publications
Kattilukkum thotillukkum Siddhar kaatiya valihal	Saruprabha Publications

== Other media contributions ==
- Many short stories were contributed to Madurai, Tuticorin radio stations and were praised by Radio fans.

== Awards and contributions ==
- "Ilakkiya Sindhanai" award to his "Koottanjoru" Sirukadaihal.
- "Therunai" short story was praised by Ananda vikadan itself.
- "Vizhuthugal" short story was praised by "Idayam pesugiradhu" weekly for "Natchathira sirukadhai".
- "Ooothapoo" short story was praised by "Saavi" weekly for its "Vaanavil sirukadhai potti".
- "Iravu nerathu magudihal" was praised by "Thai" weekly for its sirukathai potti.
- "Samuthira Kumararhal" novel was selected as one of the best novel of 1980's by TKC.This novel was accepted by Madurai Kamaraj University for M.A. subject.
- "Viduthalai vengai" novel was accepted by Annamalai University for M.Phil.
- "Viradha paruvam" - A short story collection was accepted by Pachaiyappa college, Chennai for M.Phil.
- "Velviyil Mulaitha vidhaihal" -A short story collection was accepted by Annamalai University for M.phil.
- "Jegaadhavin Sirukadhaihal" collection was accepted by Sri saradha women college(Salem), Fathima College for M.phil.

== Sources ==
The details have been gathered from the following publications.

- India Today
- Ananda Vikadan
- Kumudham
- Dhinamani
- Nakkeran
- Saravanna store
- Kunguma chimzh
- Thayin manikkodi
- Mugavai murasu
- Thodarum
- Saandror Murasu
- Niraimathi
- Ambala, Internet
- Nivedhini(Ceylon)
