= Natham Kilakarai =

Natham is a village near Kilakarai in Keelakarai taluk of Ramanathapuram district.

The dargah (grave) of Muhammad Ja'afar Shaheed (called as Mujabar auliya by the local people) who came along with Sulthan Syed Ibrahim Shaheed Badhusha of Erwadi is located here.
