= INAS 344 =

- Active: 11 April 2012 - present
- Country: India
- Branch: Indian Navy
- Role: Reconnaissance
- Garrison/HQ: INS Parundu, Tamil Nadu
- Nickname: The Spirited Shadowers

Aircraft flown
- Reconnaissance: IAI Heron

The INAS 344 is an Indian naval air squadron based at INS Parundu, Tamil Nadu. The squadron was established on 11 April 2012 and operates IAI Heron.

== Accidents and incidents ==
On 13 December 2013, one of the IAI Heron of INAS 344, bearing registration number INAS 922, crashed into the grove at Usilankattuvalasai after taking off from INS Parundu at 3:10 pm IST. After the aircraft crashed behind the naval station, the rotor blades broke into pieces, and "the engine part was found between palm and coconut trees". The remains were salvaged by 50 naval civilians.
