= Erwadi =

Village in Tamil Nadu, India

Erwadi Erwadi Dargah Shariff
- village
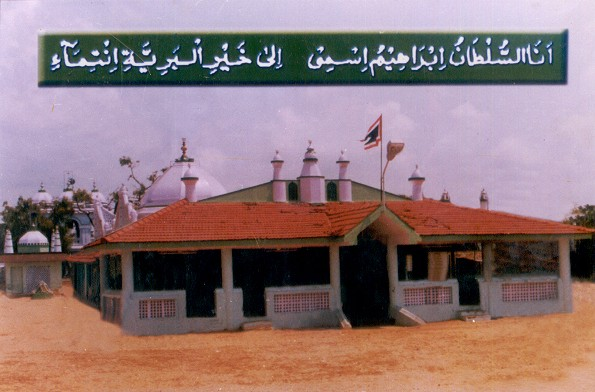
- Erwadi Dargah

- Location in Tamil Nadu, India
- Coordinates: 9°12′32″N 78°42′36″E
- Country: India
- State: Tamil Nadu
- District: Ramanathapuram district

Languages
  - Official: Tamil
- Time zone: UTC+5:30 (IST)
- Postal code: 623566
- Website: www.ervadidargah.in

Erwadi is a village located in the Ramanathapuram district of Tamil Nadu, India. It falls under the jurisdiction of the Kilakarai Taluk and the town panchayat. The village is notable for housing the grave and shrine of Qutb-us-Sultan Syed Ibrahim Badshah Shaheed, a historical ruler associated with Madurai.

Erwadi was originally part of the Kadaladi Assembly constituency, which is included in the Ramanathapuram Lok Sabha constituency. Following the delimitation of constituencies in 2009, Erwadi was incorporated into the Ramanathapuram Assembly constituency.

Erwadi is considered the second-largest contributor to the revenue of Ramanathapuram district.

== History ==
=== Importance in Islam ===
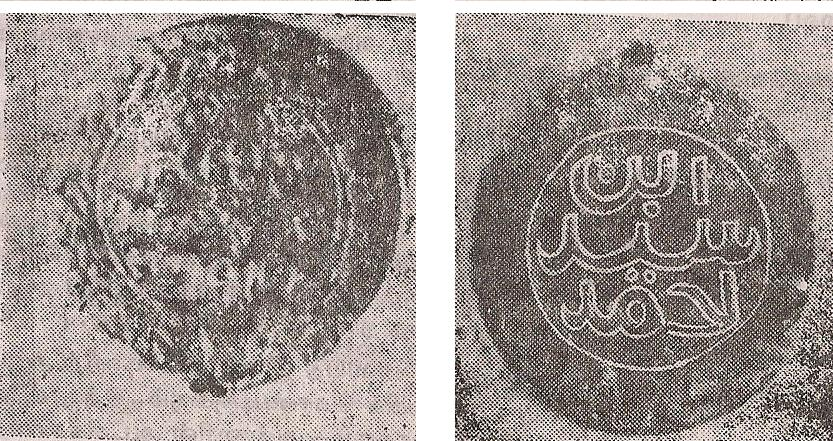
Coin minted by Syed Ibrahim Shaheed in Ervadi during his rule

According to local traditions, Sultan Syed Ibrahim Shaheed sent his commander, Sikandar Badusha, to the Pandiyan ruler Thiru Pandiyan in Madurai with the objective of converting him to Islam. When the offer was declined, a battle ensued, resulting in the victory of Shaheed's forces and the installation of Sultan Sikandar Badusha as ruler of Madurai.

Following this, Shaheed's forces advanced towards Bouthiramanickapattinam (present-day Kilakarai). There, Shaheed attempted to convert King Vikrama Pandiyan to Islam. The king refused and asked Shaheed to leave the kingdom, but Shaheed declined, stating he would not leave without fulfilling his mission. A series of battles followed, with approximately ten engagements, each lasting three to four days. During these conflicts, many members of Shaheed's family and administration, including his only son Syed Abu Tahir, his brother Syed Ismail, his brother-in-law Zainul Abideen, and several ministers, were reportedly killed.

Eventually, King Vikrama Pandiyan and his sons, Indra Pandiyan and Chandra Pandiyan, were killed, and Shaheed claimed victory. He is said to have ruled Bouthiramanickapattinam for twelve years and played a role in the spread of Islam in southern Tamil Nadu. Coins attributed to the rule of Sultan Syed Ibrahim Shaheed have reportedly been discovered by archaeologists.

Al Qutbul Hamid wal Gausul Majid Badhusha Sultan Syed Ibrahim Shaheed, believed to be a king of Medina and an 18th-generation descendant of the Islamic prophet Muhammad, is said to have arrived in Erwadi (then known as Bouthiramanickapattinam) during a journey to India in the early 12th century, with the aim of propagating Islam in accordance with the Prophet's wishes.

== Ervadi Santhanakoodu Festival ==
Decorated dargah on the eve of urus

Mosque inside the Dargah campus with a Minar

The annual Santhanakoodu Festival is held at the Erwadi Dargah in Ramanathapuram district during the Islamic month of Dhu al-Qi'dah. The festival commemorates the ''shahadat'' (martyrdom anniversary) of Qutb Sulthan Syed Ibrahim Shahid Badhusha. It is observed jointly by members of both the Hindu and Muslim communities.

== Transport ==
The nearest major town to Erwadi is Kilakarai, located approximately 10 km away. Kilakarai lies on National Highway 49 (NH 49), which connects Madurai to Rameswaram. The nearest railway station is in Ramanathapuram, situated about 27 km from Erwadi, providing rail connectivity to major cities across Tamil Nadu.

Erwadi is also connected to the coastal ports along the Bay of Bengal and serves as a junction point for fishing steamers.

== Education ==
Educational institutions in Erwadi include the following schools:

- Panchayat Union Middle School
- S.A.B.M.H Government Higher Secondary School
- Elite Matriculation School
- Kadaladi Union Middle School, Chinna Ervadi

== See also ==
- Karseri
- Kattupalli
- List of Islamic shrines in Tamil Nadu
- Madurai Maqbara
- Manamadurai
- Meesal
- Melakkal
- Natham (Keelakarai)
- Palli chandai
- Sundaramudayan
- Thachu oorani
- Thiruparankundram
- Thiruparankundram Dargah
- Thiruvedagam
- Vaippar
- Valinokkam
