= Thondi =

Town Panchayat in Tamil Nadu, India

Coordinates: 9°46′35″N 79°00′28″E

- Panchayat town
- Interactive map of Thondi
- Country: India
- State: Tamil Nadu
- District: Ramanathapuram

Government
  - Type: Town panchayat
  - Body: Town panchayat of Thondi

Population (2011)
  - Total: 18,465

Languages
  - Official: Tamil
- Time zone: UTC+5:30 (IST)
- PIN: 623409
- Vehicle registration: TN-65
- Nearest Town: Ramanathapuram; R. S. Mangalam; Tiruvadanai
- Lok Sabha constituency: Ramanathapuram
- Vidhan Sabha constituency: Tiruvadanai

Thondi (தொண்டி) is a town located in the Ramanathapuram district of the southern Indian state of Tamil Nadu. It is about 13 km from Tiruvadanai. During the Sangam period, it India, it was a port town.

== Boat Race ==
The Thondi boat race is a traditional coastal sailing competition held off the coast of Puthupattinam and Mahasathipuram near Thondi. This is the setting for 2026 movie Mandaadi

== Climate ==
Climate data for Thondi (1991–2020, extremes 1959–2020)
Month	Jan	Feb	Mar	Apr	May	Jun	Jul	Aug	Sep	Oct	Nov	Dec	Year
Record high °C (°F)	33.7 (92.7)	35.5 (95.9)	36.9 (98.4)	38.0 (100.4)	40.1 (104.2)	40.0 (104.0)	40.4 (104.7)	40.0 (104.0)	39.7 (103.5)	37.5 (99.5)	36.9 (98.4)	36.2 (97.2)	40.4 (104.7)
Mean daily maximum °C (°F)	30.3 (86.5)	31.0 (87.8)	32.5 (90.5)	33.9 (93.0)	34.1 (93.4)	34.5 (94.1)	34.3 (93.7)	33.6 (92.5)	33.2 (91.8)	32.3 (90.1)	30.6 (87.1)	29.8 (85.6)	32.5 (90.5)
Mean daily minimum °C (°F)	21.7 (71.1)	22.7 (72.9)	24.9 (76.8)	27.0 (80.6)	27.3 (81.1)	26.6 (79.9)	26.4 (79.5)	25.9 (78.6)	25.7 (78.3)	24.8 (76.6)	23.7 (74.7)	22.4 (72.3)	24.9 (76.8)
Record low °C (°F)	17.1 (62.8)	18.0 (64.4)	19.7 (67.5)	20.6 (69.1)	21.1 (70.0)	21.0 (69.8)	21.1 (70.0)	21.5 (70.7)	20.6 (69.1)	20.6 (69.1)	19.5 (67.1)	17.7 (63.9)	17.1 (62.8)
Average rainfall mm (inches)	28.2 (1.11)	27.8 (1.09)	15.4 (0.61)	51.7 (2.04)	59.9 (2.36)	24.1 (0.95)	26.0 (1.02)	44.0 (1.73)	55.1 (2.17)	229.1 (9.02)	226.5 (8.92)	129.2 (5.09)	917.1 (36.11)
Average rainy days	1.6	1.2	1.2	2.9	2.6	1.7	1.8	2.5	3.5	9.4	10.5	5.7	44.6
Average relative humidity (%) (at 17:30 IST)	75	74	73	75	78	75	74	76	78	78	80	78	76
Source: India Meteorological Department
