= Kayathar Airport =

Kayathar Airport is an unused airport near Kayatharu. The airport was operated as an airbase by the British during World War II. later it was left unused and turned to barren land though the airstrip remains undamaged. It is also easily accessible to a train route near the station.

The airstrip is currently held by the Government of India with plans to construct a new airport under UDAN scheme.
