= Devipattinam =

Town in Tamil Nadu, India

- Town panchayat
- Nickname: DVM
- Location in Tamil Nadu, India Devipattinam (India)
- Coordinates: 9.4770375°N 78.8960545°E
- Country: India
- State: Tamil Nadu
- District: Ramanathapuram

Population (2011)
  - Total: 11,599

Languages
  - Official: Tamil Tamil Arabic (Arwi)
- Time zone: UTC+5:30 (IST)
- Postal code: 623514
- Vehicle registration: TN 65
- Nearest Town: Ramanathapuram; R.S.Mangalam; Thondi
- Lok Sabha constituency: Ramanathapuram
- Vidhan Sabha constituency: Tiruvadanai

Devipattinam is a coastal town of Ramanathapuram district, Tamil Nadu, India.

Devipattinam is an ancient coastal town and a port, located in the southern state of Tamil Nadu. It was a flourishing sea port and a gateway to places as far as Madurai until the early 20th century. The famous pearl belt known as the Gulf of Mannar in the Bay of Bengal is dotted with small islands; Appa Tivu, Nallathanni Theevu, Shuli Tivu, Uppu Tanni Tivu, Talari Tivu and Musal Tivu. The coastal line of Devipattinam is formed by series of small bays and finest coral reefs in Thiruppaalaikudi.

The prime occupations of the people were pearl, conch, sea trade and transport. The mid-20th century saw a decline in the occupations of the people of Devipattinam. With the advent of the surface transport the Merchant Navies faded away and Devipattinam ceased to be a harbour and port. The cultured pearl industry and the mindless dragnet fishing that destroyed the coral reefs, choked the once robust pearl trade or Muthu Salabam. The conch and coral industries declined due to new regulations and restrictions.

Devipattinam has 7 Masjids. They are Periya pallivasal, Mela pallivasal, Thaqua pallivasal, Bukhariya pallivasal, Masjid Al Aqsa, Towheed Pallivasal and Darul Uloom Haqqaniyya pallivasal.

Arabian Traders during the sea trade era settled here and adopted the local language. They developed a dialect called ‘Arwi’ which is a combination of Arabic and Tamil. Arabian food and traditions are still followed. Islam is the dominant religion and they mostly practice the ‘Sha'fi school of thought. The Arab descendants are called Maraikayars and are found all over the coastal regions of India and Sri Lanka.

The migration of the people after the decline of the marine trade and industry resulted in people exploring the other parts of the globe. Devipattinam has a large expatriate population and a very high literacy rate.^{[2]} This enabled the people of Devipattinam to span the globe and find new riches in the Gulf, Far East, Americas and Europe.

== Demographics ==
Religious census 2011
Religion	Percent(%)
Muslims	37.15%
Hindus	51.31%
Christian	5.78%
Sikh	0.07%
Jain	0.00%
Not stated	5.69%

Devipattinam is a Census Town city in district of Ramanathapuram, Tamil Nadu. The Devipattinam Census Town has population of 11,599 of which 5,897 are males while 5,702 are females as per report released by Census India 2011.
