= Uchipuli =

Uchipuli Uchippuli
- Town
- Location in Tamil Nadu, India
- Coordinates: 9°19′0″N 79°1′0″E
- Country: India
- State: Tamil Nadu

Languages
  - Official: Tamil
- Time zone: UTC+5:30 (IST)
- PIN: 623534

Uchipuli or Uchippuli is a locality in the Mandapam block of Ramanathapuram district of the Indian state of Tamil Nadu. It is a major source of water supply for the Ramanathapuram town. An Indian Navy air station, INS Parundu, is located near Uchipuli.

== Transport ==
Uchipuli is located on the National Highway 49 (NH 49)or 85 that connects Kochi to Rameswaram. The Uchippuli Railway Station (code UCP) is located on the Rameshwaram-Ramanathapuram route. Madurai Airport (140 km) is the nearest airport.

== Naval air station ==
An Indian naval air station located near Uchipuli has been in operation since 1982 at the site of the abandoned Ramnad Civil Aerodrome. Initially known as INS Rajali II, it was formally recommissioned as "INS Parundu" on 26 March 2009 by the Chief of the Naval Staff Admiral Sureesh Mehta.

INS Parundu is used primarily as a reconnaissance station to monitor the South East Bay of Bengal, the Palk Strait, and the Gulf of Mannar. A number of naval air squadrons operating Dornier 228 and Britten-Norman Islander aircraft, HAL Chetak helicopters and UAV squadrons are based here.

In 2007, Tamil Nadu Police recovered 1950 detonators hidden in a coconut grove at Uchipuli. They were suspected to have been stashed there by the LTTE for use against Sri Lankan Military.
