= Sundaramudayan =

Village in Tamil Nadu, India

Sundaramudayan or Seeniappa dargah or Dargah valasai is a coastal village near Uchipuli in Ramanathapuram district.

There is a Naval base of the Indian Navy near Uchipuli called INS Parundu Naval Air Station. The village also has Sundaramariyamman Temple which is a popular destination for the devotees.
