= Chittarkottai =

- village
- Location in Tamil Nadu, India Chittarkottai (India)
- Coordinates: 9°25′38″N 78°54′15″E
- Country: India
- State: Tamil Nadu
- District: Ramanathapuram

Languages
  - Official: Tamil
- Time zone: UTC+5:30 (IST)
- PIN: 623513
- Telephone code: 04567
- Vehicle registration: TN 65
- Nearest city: Ramanathapuram
- Lok Sabha constituency: Ramanathapuram
- Vidhan Sabha constituency: Tiruvadani

Chittarkottai is a Panchayat in Ramanathapuram district, Tamil Nadu, India. It has consists of seven villages with different faiths of religions people. Most of the people following Hinduism and Islamic Culture. Remaining people following religion of Christianity. The coastline along with 'Bay of Bengal'. People incomes are based on agriculture harvesting and Fishing. The village has the Mohamedia Higher Secondary School and Government High school Palanivalasai in palanivalasai sub village. Nearby Syed Ammal arts and science College is there, also one Municipal Maternity home is Located. Some beautiful east coast beaches and the village is known for the Murugan Temple near the sea in Mudiveeran Pattinam (a sub-village in chittar kottai ).

== Panchayat ==
Chittarkottai is village Panchayat. Panchayat President Mrs. Musthari Jahan was elected during 2020 election.

== Geography ==
It is situated 13 km North East from Ramanathapuram. Devipattinam is 5 km from Chittarkottai. The Chennai - Rameshwaram bypass road is crossing chittarkottai. The geographical position is: 9.4287N / 78.9005E

== Education ==
Mohamedia Higher Secondary School is educational institution for East Ramnathapuram. Mohamedia primary school was founded in 1905 and developed into Mohamedia middle school by 1957. Then Mohamedia High School on 1971. As of now Mohamedia higher secondary school is successful educating students from surrounding villages. After the development of Mohamedia Higher Secondary School, the area's education level went up to 95%, and girls also enrolled.
