= Thachu oorani =

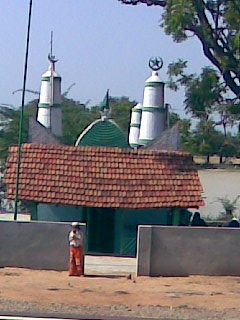
Dargah of Syed Mursal Ibrahim Waliyullah Razi in thachu oorani, in between Ervadi and Keelakarai

Thachu oorani is a village locality near Mayakulam between Kilakkarai and Erwadi dargah in the East Coast Road in Ramanathapuram district in Tamil Nadu.
