= INS Parundu =

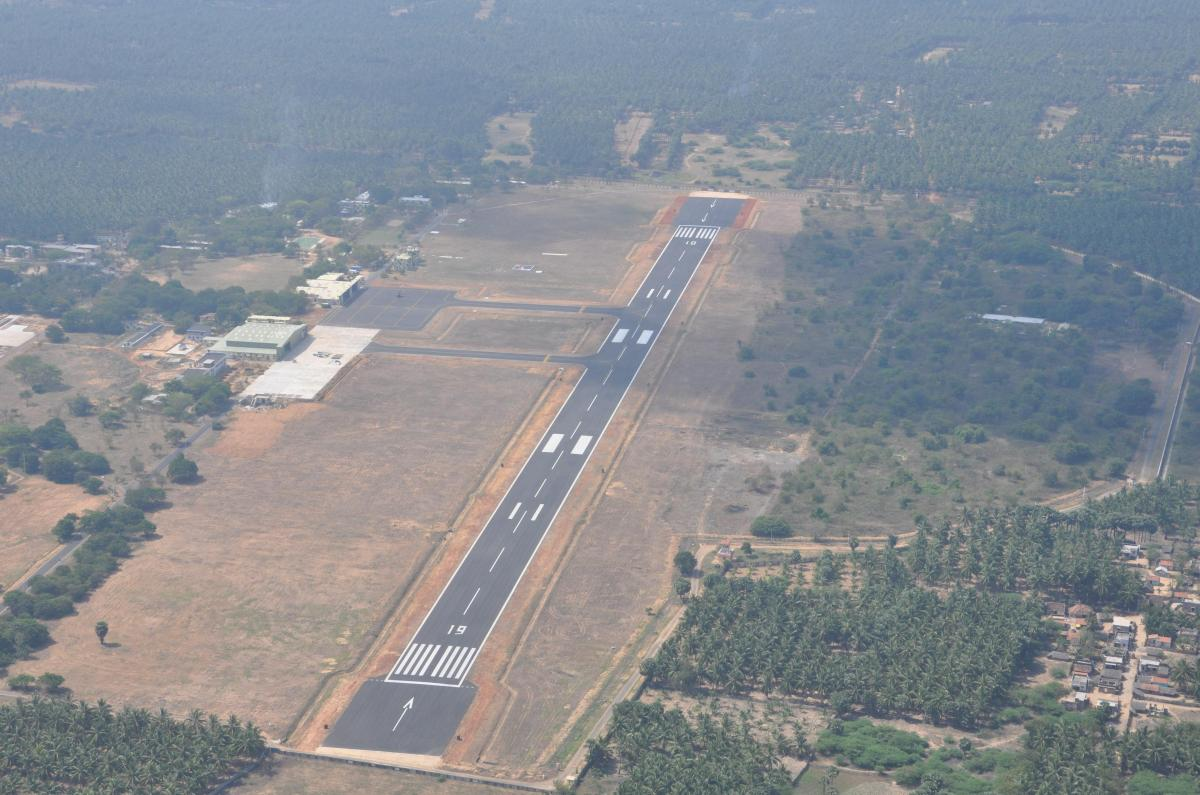
- IATA: none; ICAO: VORM

Summary
- Airport type: Naval Air Station
- Operator: Indian Navy
- Location: Near Uchipuli, Ramanathapuram, Tamil Nadu
- Coordinates: 09°19′26″N 78°58′22″E
- Interactive map of INS Parundu

Runways
Direction	Length		Surface
Direction	m	ft	Surface
	920	3,017	Asphalt

INS Parundu is an Indian naval air station located near Uchipuli in the Ramanathapuram of the state of Tamil Nadu. It operates under the Eastern Naval Command of the Indian Navy. The air station will be opened up for civilian flights under Phase 2 of the Regional Connectivity Scheme (RCS) of the Government of India also known as UDAN and the Airports Authority of India (AAI) has started preparatory work at the airstrip. It is sandwiched between Rameswaram National Highway Road and Railway track which leads towards Rameswaram.

== History ==
The airfield in Ramanathapuram was previously the abandoned Ramnad Civil Aerodrome. Naval aviation first utilised the facilities in 1982, to monitor the Palk Strait in the wake of the Sri Lankan Civil War.

The facilities were fully transferred to the Navy on 9 June 1985, and the naval air station was initially commissioned INS Rajali II.

On 26 March 2009, the base was renamed and commissioned as INS Parundu, for the Tamil word for an eagle. The facilities have since been upgraded to operate larger aircraft. It is primarily used by the navy as a reconnaissance station to monitor the South East Bay of Bengal, the northern Indian Ocean, the Gulf of Mannar and the Palk Strait.

On 25 August 2017, an Integrated Automatic Aviation Meteorological System (IAAMS) was added.

== Units ==
The primary units based at INS Parundu are Indian Naval Air Squadrons (INAS) that operate HAL Chetak helicopters and Islander reconnaissance aircraft.

Besides upgrading the runway, the Navy has installed dedicated facilities to operate UAVs from the air station. INAS 344, operating IAI Heron and IAI Searcher Mk II UAVs is based at INS Parundu.

== See also ==
Indian navy

- List of Indian Navy bases
- List of active Indian Navy ships

Integrated commands and units

- Armed Forces Special Operations Division
- Defence Cyber Agency
- Integrated Defence Staff
- Integrated Space Cell
- Indian Nuclear Command Authority
- Indian Armed Forces
- Special Forces of India

Other lists

- Strategic Forces Command
- List of Indian Air Force stations
- List of Indian Navy bases
- India's overseas military bases
