= Tiruvadanai =

Tiruvadanai Thiru Adanai
- town
- Location in Tamil Nadu, India
- Coordinates: 9°47′0″N 78°55′10″E
- Country: India
- State: Tamil Nadu
- District: Ramanathapuram

Government
  - Type: Municipal corporation
  - Body: Nagar Palika

Languages
  - Official: Tamil
- Time zone: UTC+5:30 (IST)
- PIN: 623407
- Telephone code: 04561

Tiruvadanai or Thiruvadanai is a town and a taluk headquarters of the Ramanathapuram district, in Tamil Nadu, India. The town is known for the Adhi Ratneswarar Temple and is mentioned in the Thevaram hymns.

It is situated about 70 km away from Ramanathapuram and can be reached from Karaikudi via Devakottai or Madurai via Sivagangai.

== Etymology ==
Thiruvadanai is one of the many temple towns in the state which is named after the grooves, clusters or forests dominated by a particular variety of a tree or shrub and the same variety of tree or shrub sheltering the presiding deity. The region is believed to have been covered with Vilva forest and hence called Vilvavanam.

The name Tiruvadanai or Thiruvadanai is believed to have originated from an ancient myth associated with the town. Legend has it that Vaaruni, the son of Varuna, the God of rain who was cursed by a Sage to have an elephant's body and a goat's head, regained his normal form after worshiping Shiva at this temple. The name of the town is believed to have been derived from this mythological incident(Thiru- sacred; Adu- goat; Aanai- elephant; Thiru Adanai- the sacred place, where the goat-headed-elephant regained his original form).

== Adhi Ratneswarar Temple ==
The Adhi Ratneswarar Temple situated in Tiruvadanai, is one of the 14 temples in Paandiya Naadu praised in the Thevaram hymns. Sages Agasthya, Markandeya and the holy cow Kamadenu were believed to have worshiped Lord Shiva at this temple.

The temple is also mentioned in the Thirupugal and Thevara Pathigam works of Tamil poets Arunagirinathar and Sambandar respectively.

== Transportation ==
The town is well connected by means of road. The nearest railway station is situated at the Devakottai Road train station and the nearest airport is at Madurai.
