= Ramanathapuram =

Ramanathapuram Muguvai Ramnad (shortened)
- Town
- Ramanathapuram, Tamil Nadu
- Coordinates: 9.363900°N 78.839500°E
- Country: India
- State: Tamil Nadu
- District: Ramanathapuram

Government
  - Type: Municipality
  - Body: Ramanathapuram spacial grade Municipality
- Elevation: 35 m (115 ft)

Population (2011)
  - Total: 61,440
  - Rank: 2nd in Ramanathapuram District (as of 2011 census)

Languages
  - Official: Tamil
- Time zone: UTC+5:30 (IST)
- Postal code: Code starts with 623
- Telephone code: 04567
- Vehicle registration: TN-65
- Website: https://ramanathapuram.nic.in

Ramanathapuram, also known as Ramnad, is a town in Ramanathapuram district in the Indian state of Tamil Nadu. It is the administrative headquarters of Ramanathapuram district and the second largest town (by population) in Ramanathapuram district.

== History ==
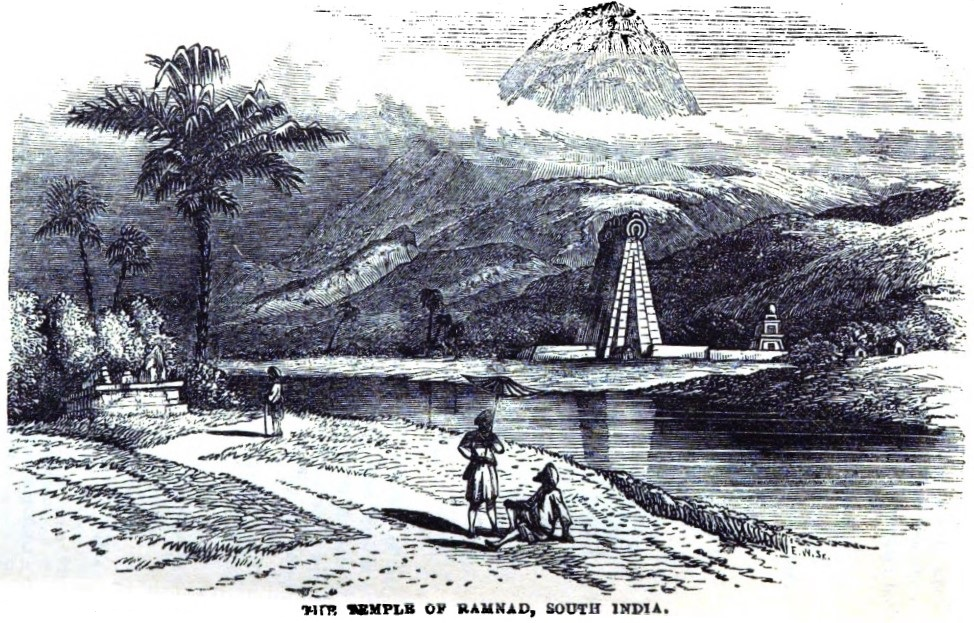
The temple of Mugavai, South India (1858)

The town is at times referred to as Mukhavai (Mugavai) Nagaram, that is, Entrance town. The region is well known since Puranic ages. The estate of Ramnad included the Hindu holy island city of Rameswaram, from where, legend has it that the Hindu god Rama launched his invasion of Ravana's Lanka. On the conclusion of the war and Rama's success in it, he appointed a Sethupathi or "lord of the bridge" to guard the way to the island. The "bridge" referred to here is a chain of natural limestone shoals known as Adam's Bridge, (Note: Sinhala: ආදම්ගේ පාලම ādamgē pālama; Tamil: ஆதாம் பாலம் ātām pālam) also known as Rama's Bridge or Rama Setu, (Note: Sinhala: රාමගේ පාලම rāmagē pālama; Tamil: ராமர் பாலம் Rāmar pālam; Sanskrit: रामसेतु rāmasetu. Also spelled Ram Sethu, Ramasethu and other variants.) which according to Hindu legend is believed to have been constructed by Rama. The chieftains of Ramnad were entrusted with the responsibility of protecting the bridge, hence the appellation.

Historically, for a short period, this area had been under the Chola dynasty when Rajendra Chola I brought it under his territory in 1063 CE.

In the late 12th and early 13th centuries, this province was ruled by Hazrat Sulthan Syed Ibrahim shaheed of Ervadi. Later on, his heirs were ruling the province following a peace treaty with the Sethupathis. From then, until the early 15th century the present territories of Ramanathapuram district—comprising the taluks Tiruvadanai, Kilakarai, Paramakudi, Kamuthi, Mudukulathur, Ramanathapuram and Rameswaram—were included in the Pandyan Empire.

During the 14th and 15th centuries, the traditional chieftain of the region who belonged to the Maravar caste was officially recognized as Sethupathi by the Nayak king of Madurai. The chieftain of Ramnad, in return, recognized the sovereignty of the Nayak king over his lands. When the power of the Nayak kings of Madurai began to decline in the late 17th century, the chieftains of Ramnad asserted their independence. In the late 17th century, Raghunatha Kilavan crowned himself king of Ramnad and changed his seat from Pogalur to Ramnad close to the east coast. He erected massive fortifications to protect his capital. In 1725, the king of Tanjore claimed the northern part of the Ramnad kingdom (the Aranthangi region) up to the river Pambar in return for his services during the civil war in Ramnad. A vassal of Ramnad who was amongst the victors in the civil war took over the westerly located Sivaganga region, thereby leaving only three-fifths of the kingdom actually in the hands of the king of Ramnad. At the beginning of the 18th century, family disputes over succession resulted in the division of Ramanathapuram. With the help of the King of Thanjavur in 1730, one of the chieftains deposed the Sethupathi and became the Raja of Sivaganga.

In 1741 the area came under the control of the Marathas and then under the Nizam in 1744. Dissatisfied with the Nawab's rule, the chieftains revolted, led by the last ruling Nayak, against the Nawab in 1752. By that time, the throne of Arcot had two rivals, Chanda Shahib and Muhammed Ali, and this district was under the rule of Nawab of Arcot. The British supported Chand Sahib, whilst the French supported Muhammed Ali. This paved the way for a series of conflicts in the southern part of the continent also called Carnatic Wars.

In 1795, the British deposed Muthuramalinga Sethupathi and took control of the administration of Ramanathapuram. After the death of the Queen Velu Nachiyar, the Maruthu brothers took charge by paying regular revenue to the East India company. In 1803 the Maruthu Pandiyar of Sivaganga revolted against the British in collaboration with Kattabomman of Panchalamkurichi. Colonel Agnew captured and hanged the Maruthu brothers. After the fall of Tippu Sultan, the British took control and imprisoned the Nawab. In 1892 the Zamindari system was abolished and a British collector was appointed for administration.

In 1910, Ramanathapuram was formed from portions of Madurai and Tirunelveli districts, with J.F. Bryant as the first collector. During the British period this district was called "Ramnad"; the name continued after independence. Later the district was renamed as Ramanathapuram to be in conformity with the Tamil name for this region."Ramnad" is also known as "Mugavai"(face) since it acts as the entry point for River "Vaigai".

== Demographics ==
Religious census
Religion	Percent(%)
Hindu	76.39%
Muslim	19.77%
Christian	3.08%
Sikh	0.01%
Other	0.79%
No religion	0.01%

According to 2011 census, Ramanathapuram had a population of 61,440 with a sex-ratio of 988 females for every 1,000 males, much above the national average of 929. A total of 6,370 were under the age of six, constituting 3,245 males and 3,125 females. The average literacy of the town was 93.42%, compared to the national average of 72.99%. The town had a total of 14716 households. There were a total of 20,375 workers, comprising 115 cultivators, 178 main agricultural labourers, 262 in house hold industries, 18,773 other workers, 1,047 marginal workers, 20 marginal cultivators, 30 marginal agricultural labourers, 41 marginal workers in household industries and 956 other marginal workers.

Among Hindus Agamudayars, Maravars,Kallars, Konars, Devendrakulam are more predominant population and also large number of Vellalars, Muslims constitute a demographic population in Ramanathapuram District.

As per the religious census of 2011, Ramanathapuram had 76.39% Hindus, 19.77% Muslims, 3.08% Christians, 0.01% Sikhs, 0.7% following other religions and 0.01% following no religion or did not indicate any religious preference.

== Civic administration ==
Ramanathapuram is a municipality. After shifting the district headquarters' offices from Madurai to Ramanathapuram, the town is growing. The gauge conversion of the railway from Madurai to Rameswaram and from Trichy to Rameswaram connects the town to all major Indian cities. Ramanathapuram district was a larger district in Tamil Nadu, and later some of its portions were removed to create Sivaganga district.

The river Vaigai enters the Big Tank (periya kanmaai) and the water is collected for the purpose of agriculture. It is claimed that the river water does not reach the sea, portraying the size of the catchment area. The town has many ponds catering to the needs of the populace. It is a good sign to have few engineering colleges like Anna University, UCER-Ramnad campus, Syed Ammal Engineering College and Mohamed Sathak Engineering College.

Former Indian president A.P.J. Abdul Kalam attended Schwartz Higher Secondary School, Ramanathapuram.

== Government ==
It is a part of Ramanathapuram (Lok Sabha constituency).

== Geography ==
Ramanathapuram is located at 9.38°N 78.83°E. It has an average elevation of 2 metres (6 feet). The nearest towns include Paramakudi, Rameshwaram, Mudukulathur, Kilakarai and Manamadurai.

== Transport ==
The town is located in south east Tamil Nadu and connected by NH 49 (also called as AH 43) to Madurai from Rameswaram. East Coast Road is the major coastal road in east Tamil Nadu which connects the state capital Chennai and Ramanathapuram; this road also connects Ramanathapuram with Pondicherry, Thoothukudi and Kanyakumari. Ramanathapuram railway station is well connected by railroad to major cities in India through Madurai Junction and Karaikudi Junction.

The nearest international airport is Madurai Airport, about 125 km and domestic airport is Tuticorin Airport about 140 km. The Nearest Naval Station is located in Uchipuli In the name of INS Parundu.

== Education ==
Government Arts College for Women is located in Ramanathapuram.

== Notable people ==
- Ramnad Krishnan, the famous Carnatic singer
- Ramanathapuram Srinivasa Iyengar, the famous Carnatic singer
- Jegaatha (born 1956), Tamil author
- Pasumpon Muthuramalinga Thevar (born 1908), Freedom Fighter
- Kamal Haasan (born 1954), film Actor
- Vikram born(1966), film Actor
- A.P.J Abdul Kalam, Missile Man, Scientist, President of India.
- R. C. Sakthi, Film Director

== Tourism ==
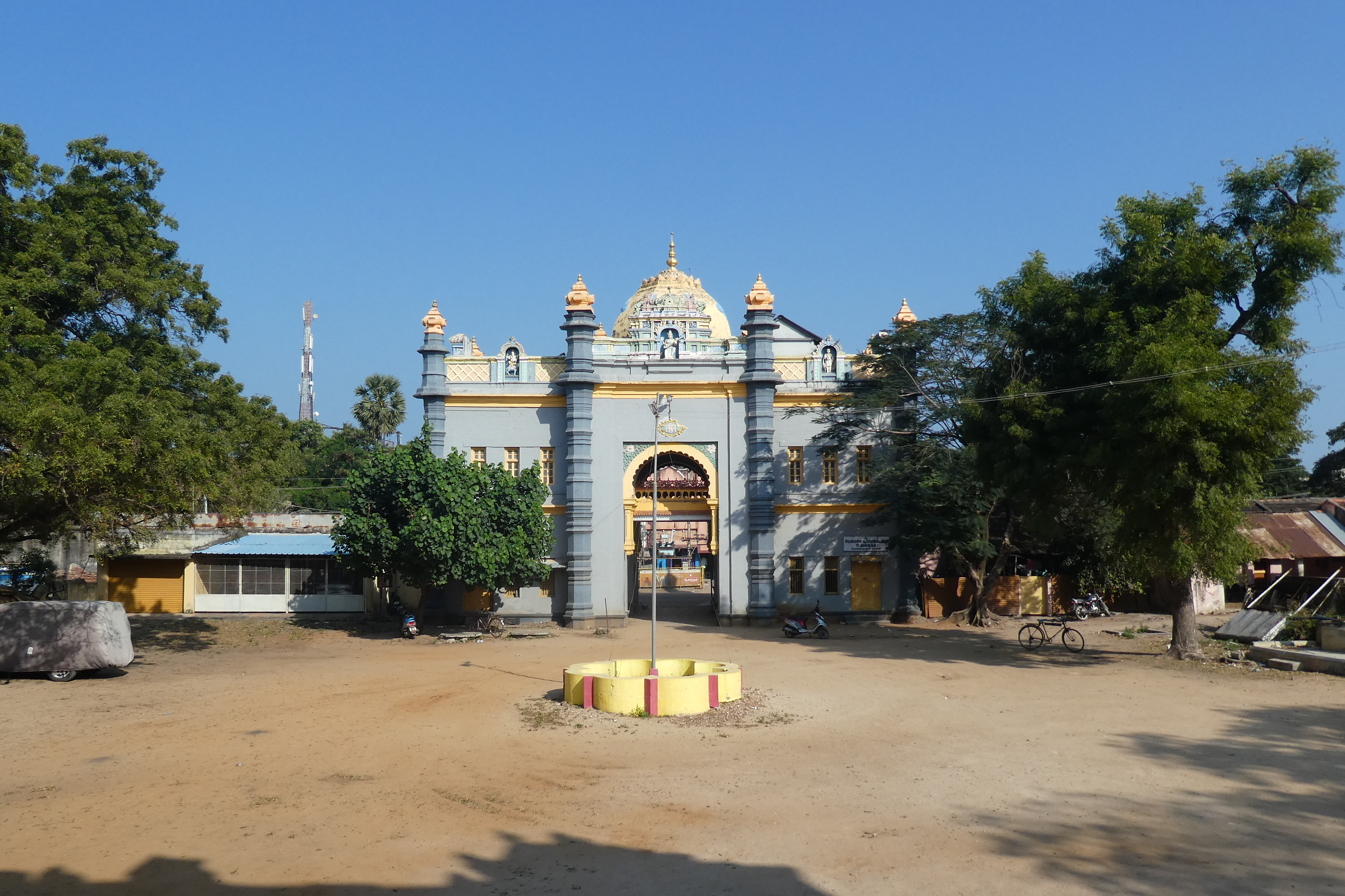
Palace of Ramanathapuram

Tourists visit Ramnad to see the Raja Palace, still occupied by the former Sethupaty Raja and his family.

The royal family sends the elephant for Santhanakoodu procession in Erwadi during the annual Santhanakoodu Festival.

Ramanathapuram is close to Rameswaram, Devipattinam, Thiruppullani, and Uthirakosamangai which are very important ancient pilgrimage centres.

Uchipuli, an Indian naval air station with near by Ariyamaan Beach is one among the popular beaches in Uchipuli.

Periyapattinam, Athiyuthu, Panaikulam, Alagankulam, Puduvalasai, Chittarkottai, Valoor beaches are other popular in Ramnad region.

And there is also memorial for former President of India A. P. J. Abdul Kalam is also located at Peikarumbu near Ramanathapuram.
