= Forward Bloc (disambiguation) =

All India Forward Bloc is a political party in India.

Forward Bloc could also refer to :

- All India Forward Bloc (Subhasist), Indian political party
- All India Forward Bloc (Ruikar), Indian political party
- National Forward Bloc, Indian political party
- Indian People's Forward Bloc, Indian political party
- Independent Forward Bloc, a political party in Mauritius
- Marxist Forward Bloc, Indian political party
- West Bengal Forward Bloc, Indian political party
- Democratic Forward Bloc, Indian political party
- Pasumpon Forward Bloc, Indian political party
- Tamil Nadu Forward Bloc, Indian political party
- All India Forward Bloc (Ramayan Singh), Indian political party
- Forward Bloc (Socialist), Indian political party
- National Forward Bloc, Indian political party
- Desiya Forward Bloc, Indian political party
