= P. Neethipathi =

Indian politician

- பா. நீதிபதி

Member of the Tamil Nadu Legislative Assembly
- In office 2016–2021
- Preceded by: P. V. Kathiravan
- Succeeded by: P. Ayyappan
- Constituency: Usilampatti

Personal details
- Born: 12 June 1966 (age 60) Usilampatti, Madurai district, Tamil Nadu, India
- Party: All India Anna Dravida Munnetra Kazhagam
- Education: Post Graduate (M.A.)
- Occupation: Politician, Agriculturist

P. Neethipathi is an Indian politician and a former member of the Tamil Nadu Legislative Assembly. He hails from the Usilampatti area of Madurai district.

A postgraduate degree holder, Neethipathi belongs to the All India Anna Dravida Munnetra Kazhagam (AIADMK) party. He was elected to the Tamil Nadu Legislative Assembly from the Usilampatti Assembly constituency in the 2016 state assembly elections.

== Electoral Performance ==
=== 2016 ===
2016 Tamil Nadu Legislative Assembly election: Usilampatti
Party	Candidate	Votes	%	±%
AIADMK	P. Neethipathi	106,349	52.88%	New
DMK	K. Ilamakezhan	73,443	36.52%	−5.81
MDMK	A. Baskara Sethupathy	7,079	3.52%	New
AIFB	P. V. Kathiravan	5,136	2.55%	New
BJP	M. Sangli	2,860	1.42%	+0.31
NOTA	NOTA	1,672	0.83%	New
NTK	G. Iyndhu Kovilan	1,437	0.71%	New
Margin of victory		32,906	16.36%	+7.47%
Turnout		201,126	74.70%	−4.61%
Registered electors		269,244		
AIADMK gain from AIFB		Swing	1.65%	
