= South India Forward Bloc =

- Leader: K.C. Thirumaran
- Founder: K.C. Thirumaran
- Headquarters: 5/197, Chinna Managalakudi, Uthangudi Post, Madurai, Tamil Nadu – 625107.
- Ideology: Dharmic National Alignment, Anti - Dravidianism
- ECI status: Registered, Unrecognised Political Party
- Alliance: NDA (2014-Present); AIADMK+ (2014-2023) (2025-Present)
- Seats in Rajya Sabha: 0 / 245
- Seats in Lok Sabha: 0 / 543
- Seats in Tamil Nadu Legislative Assembly: 0 / 234
- Number of states and union territories in government: 0 / 31

Party flag
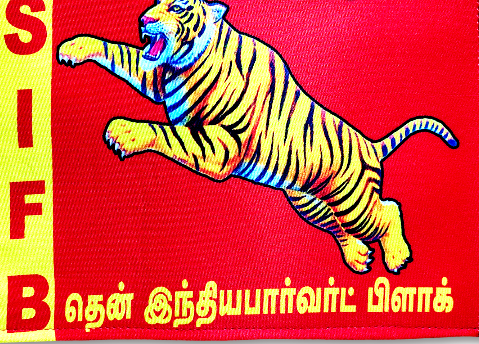

The South India Forward Bloc (SIFB) is a registered, unrecognized regional political party primarily active in the Indian state of Tamil Nadu. Founded in 2009 by K. C. Thirumaran, the party is a splinter faction rooted in the historical fragmentation of the All India Forward Bloc (AIFB) in southern India.

Unlike the socialist ideology of the parent AIFB, the SIFB pivots towards right-wing cultural realism, focusing on the preservation of Sanatana Dharma and nationalist values.

== History ==
The legacy of Subhas Chandra Bose's All India Forward Bloc has historically seen multiple regional splits in Tamil Nadu, heavily influenced by localized socio-political dynamics and leadership friction. Over the decades, various factions emerged, including the Tamil Nadu Forward Bloc and the Democratic Forward Bloc.

In 2009, political leader K. C. Thirumaran established the South India Forward Bloc in Madurai to carve out a distinct regional platform. While keeping the historic "Forward Bloc" name nomenclature, the party diverged completely from traditional leftist principles.

== Ideology and stance ==
The South India Forward Bloc strongly rejects the scientific socialism championed by the original AIFB. Its core platform revolves around:

- Dharmic National Alignment: Advocating for the integration of traditional spiritual values and Hindu Dharma into public welfare and policy.
- Anti-Dravidianism: The party regularly critiques standard regional Dravidian equity and leftist alliances in Tamil Nadu, pushing instead for a youth-driven cultural awakening.

== Alliance and electoral activity ==
The party operates as a Registered Unrecognized Political Party (RUPP) under the Election Commission of India.

While the SIFB functions as an independent organisation, its leadership maintains close political alignments with the Bharatiya Janata Party (BJP) and the National Democratic Alliance (NDA). In the 2026 Tamil Nadu Legislative Assembly election, party president K. C. Thirumaran formally contested as the BJP candidate representing the Tiruppattur constituency in Sivaganga district, securing 29,054 votes.

== See also ==
- All India Forward Bloc
- Tamil Nadu Forward Bloc
- Democratic Forward Bloc
