= R. Pandiammal =

- இரா. பாண்டியம்மாள்

Member of the Tamil Nadu Legislative Assembly
- In office 1991–1996
- Preceded by: P. N. Vallarasu
- Succeeded by: P. N. Vallarasu
- Constituency: Usilampatti

Personal details
- Born: 1 June 1953 (age 73) Usilampatti, Tamil Nadu, India
- Party: All India Anna Dravida Munnetra Kazhagam
- Education: B.A.
- Occupation: Politician, Agriculturist

R. Pandiammal is an Indian politician and a former member of the Tamil Nadu Legislative Assembly. She hails from the Thenichalai area of Usilampatti in the Madurai district.

A graduate with a Bachelor's degree, Pandiammal belongs to the All India Anna Dravida Munnetra Kazhagam (AIADMK) party. She was elected to the Tamil Nadu Legislative Assembly from the Usilampatti Assembly constituency in the 1991 state assembly elections.

== Electoral Performance ==
=== 1991 ===
1991 Tamil Nadu Legislative Assembly election: Usilampatti
Party	Candidate	Votes	%	±%
AIADMK	R. Pandiammal	41,654	50.30%	+35.11
AIFB	P. N. Vallarasu	38,460	46.44%	New
BJP	R. S. Bose	638	0.77%	+0.13
PMK	A. Thangavelu	606	0.73%	New
Margin of victory		3,194	3.86%	−11.89%
Turnout		82,818	55.29%	−8.09%
Registered electors		155,036		
AIADMK gain from DMK		Swing	16.55%	
