= M. Vijay =

Indian politician (born 1993)

Mahalingam Vijay (born 1993) is an Indian politician from Tamil Nadu. He is a member of the Tamil Nadu Legislative Assembly from the Usilampatti Assembly constituency in Madurai district representing the Tamilaga Vettri Kazhagam.

== Early life ==
Vijay is from Usilampatti, Madurai district, Tamil Nadu. He is the son of Mahalingam. He completed his SSLC in 2001 and Class 12 in 2004. Later, he did BA and then BL at Ambedkar Law College, Madurai in April 2010. He runs his own business, Mercury Broilers and declared assets worth Rs.1 crore in his affidavit to the Election Commission of India.

== Career ==
Vijay won from the Usilampatti Assembly constituency representing the Tamilaga Vettri Kazhagam in the 2026 Tamil Nadu Legislative Assembly election. He polled 65,743 votes and defeated his nearest rival, I. Mahendran of the All India Anna Dravida Munnetra Kazhagam, by a margin of 1,805 votes.
