= Revolutionary Forward Bloc =

Political party in Tamil Nadu, India

Revolutionary Forward Bloc was a political party in Tamil Nadu, India. The party was founded in 1968 by S. Andi Thevar and Velayudham Nayar, following a split from the All India Forward Bloc.

In the 1971 Tamil Nadu Legislative Assembly election, S. Andi Thevar challenged the regional AIFB leader P.K. Mookiah Thevar. S. Andi Thevar was defeated, receiving 16 909 votes (25%) against 49 292 for P.K. Mookiah Thevar (75%).

In the 1977 Tamil Nadu Legislative Assembly election, RFB contested as part of the 'Progressive Front'. The front consisted of All India Anna Dravida Munnetra Kazhagam, Congress (R), Communist Party of India, Tamil Nadu Muslim League, Tamil Nadu Toilers Party, Backward Classes Progressive Federation and RFB.

In 1979, following mediation by P.K. Mookkiah Thevar, RFB merged back into AIFB.
