= India Bloc (disambiguation) =

India Bloc may refer to:

- Indian National Developmental Inclusive Alliance
- All India Forward Bloc
- All India Forward Bloc (Subhasist)
