= Perungamanallur =

- Village
- Location in Tamil Nadu, India Perungamanallur (India)
- Coordinates: 9.868883°N 77.820282°E
- Country: India
- State: Tamil Nadu
- District: Madurai

Government
  - M.L.A: P.Neethipathi

Languages
  - Official: Tamil
- Time zone: UTC+5:30 (IST)

Perungamanallur is a village in Peraiyur taluk, Sedapatti block, Madurai district in the Indian state of Tamil Nadu and part of Usilampatti (State Assembly Constituency)

Perungamanallur massacre,

A resistance against coloniser.

Historians and Anthropologists consider fingerprinting under the Criminal Tribes Act (CTA) as a means to resist the movement of individuals and population by police suspecting criminality as one of the most draconian laws that came into existence in the Colonial era.

The Piramalai Kallars (Mukkulathor), among other castes in the erstwhile Madras Presidency, were systematically fingerprinted (suspecting thievery) and restricted to their villages under CTA, 1911.

The centenary of the promulgation of the Act falls on the year 2011 and years ago 16 persons were killed in Perungamanallur, near Sedapatti resisting CTA.

Members from various organisations and parties paid homage at the Black Pillar erected in memory of those victims.

The black pillar with a burning torch on top in Perungamanallur now stands as a symbol of resistance against the coloniser and his draconian law.

History of CTA

Originally the CTA came into being in 1871 and further amendments were made in 1911, 1924 and 1944, which gradually toned down the provisions of the Act.

Studies revolved around anthropomorphic details and caste which was considered as an entity with concrete and measurable traits such as endogamy, commensality rules, fixed occupation and common ritual practices were looked into.

Most importantly it was said that the colonial discourse on criminal castes and tribes has developed around the accounts of ethnographic accounts of administrator historians.

As per the Act, members of the criminal tribes had their fingerprints taken and their mobility restricted. Under Section 10(a) of the Act, hours were fixed for them to report to the police. After 1918, the registration of Kallars under the CTA proceeded at a brisk pace of several thousands each year and resistance to this intrusion reached a climax in 1920.

In 1919–20, 1,400 Kallars were brought under this Section. The hours fixed were 11 p.m. to 4 a.m., which compelled them to sleep at the police station every day. This made life difficult for the Kallars and the women in the community had no safety.

Refusals to appear for registration saw several armed policemen go to the village of Perungamanallur near Sedapatti, protests by the Kallars resulted in indiscriminate firing where 15 Kallar men and one woman was killed.

Historian David Arnold in his book ‘Police Power and Colonial Rule Madras, 1859-1947' writes, "The police fired 89 rounds of ball and 17 of buckshot at villagers armed only with spears, sticks, stones and sickles, eleven were killed outright and of the eight others seriously injured, three died later."

Change in system

Historian and Folklorist, Stuart Blackburn says that, The Police Re-organization Act, 1860, set the foundation of the present police system and introduced a fundamental change in the village ‘kaval' system could be seen as reasons which led to various social effects ultimately leading to the CTA.

Later enactments in 1873 and 1899 upgraded the village police and introduced the low level ghat taliaris, but the traditional calling of many Kallars and their right to collect kaval fees remained illegal.

The social effects of the abolition of kaval were obvious, the attempt to abolish kaval without filling the economic gap which this would entail would be to repeat history and to produce results in crime which can well be imagined.
