= Piramalai Kallar =

Sub-caste of the Kallars, part of the Mukkulathor community

- Classification: Backward Class / Denotified Class
- Languages: Tamil
- Country: India
- Subdivisions: Sub-caste of Kallar

Piramalai Kallars is a sub-caste of the Kallars and thus are part of the Mukkulathor community that also includes the Maravar and Agamudayar castes. They are listed as an Other Backward Class and Denotified Class in Tamil Nadu.

== History ==
Copper plate inscriptions dated 1645, 1652, 1655 and 1656 are the most important artefacts about the Piramalai Kallars. According to these, during the period of Thirumalai Nayak, members of the community were appointed as guards ("kavalkarars") of villages. The Piramalai Kallar group responsible for a village had to compensate for any theft in that village.

Piramalai Kallar local chieftains, such as Tirumal Pinna Thevar, also performed judicial duties by organising panchayats. This is described in the 1655 inscription.

With a separate system of judiciary and policing, they refused to accede to British rule. In 1767, around 5000 Kallars were killed by British forces near Melur in a single day when they refused to pay tax.

With the introduction of British rule and the fall of the Nayak dynasty, the Piramalai Kallars began to lose their work as guards. They participated in the South Indian Rebellion of 1800-1801 that resulted in Madurai and the adjoining regions coming under the British rule. When the rebellious Kallars refused to pay tax, the British abolished the kavalkarar system.

Piramalai Kallars were reduced to poverty, reliant on land farming, while continuing to oppose the British. They became classified as a criminal tribe under the Criminal Tribes Act (CTA). (Note: Although the Criminal Tribes Act was introduced in 1871, its provisions were not generally applied in South India until the amended Act of 1911.)

On 3 April 1920 a group of Piramalai Kallars at Perungamanallur village battled against the British in protest against the CTA. A memorial pillar at the village names 16 inhabitants who were shot dead during the incident. The Act, which had originally been introduced in 1871 and then amended in 1911, was repealed in 1948.

== Notable people ==
- P.K. Mookiah Thevar
- Maya Thevar
- O. A. K. Thevar
- Periya Karuppu Thevar
- Dindigul C. Sreenivasan
- Bharathiraja
- Vairamuthu

== Elected representatives ==
2021 Tamil Nadu Legislative Assembly election

- A. Maharajan
- P. Ayyappan
- Sellur K. Raju
- V. V. Rajan Chellappa
- Dindigul C. Sreenivasan
