= Bharatiya Jan Congress =

Political party in India

Bharatiya Jan Congress (Indian Popular Congress) was a political party that existed in the Indian state of Bihar around 1999-2001. BJC was led by the ex-Chief Minister Jagannath Mishra.

Mishra, who then belonged to the Indian National Congress, was the Chief Minister of Bihar 1975-1979, 1980-1983 and 1989-1990. Mishra was an opponent of the leadership of Sitaram Kesri in the Congress party.

Mishra was accused of corruption in connection with the so-called 'fodder scandal'. During one period he has imprisoned for his role in the affair.

In 1999 BJC was active in forming a political front in Bihar consisting of BJC, Bihar Vikas Party, Janata Dal (Secular), All India Forward Bloc, Samajwadi Janata Party and Nationalist Congress Party. The front was supposed to confront both the National Democratic Alliance and Rashtriya Janata Dal.

The BJC youth wing was called Bharatiya Yuva Jan Congress (Indian Youth Popular Congress) and the student wing Bharatiya Chhatra Jan Congress (Indian Student Popular Congress).

In 2001 BJC merged with Nationalist Congress Party. Mishra did however leave NCP ahead of the 2004 elections and joined Janata Dal (United). Later Mishra joined RJD.

== See also ==
- Indian National Congress breakaway parties
