= T. V. Sasivarna Thevar =

- Born: 6 August 1912
- Died: 7 November 1973 (aged 61)
- Occupation: politician

T.V. Sasivarna Thevar (6 August 1912 – 7 November 1973) was an Indian politician. He was a protégé of U. Muthuramalinga Thevar and a leader of the Forward Bloc.

Sasivarna Thevar was born in the southern part of the Madras province. to T.Ladasamy servai& Guruvammal. In 1934 he joined the movement organized by Muthuramalinga Thevar to oppose the Criminal Tribes Act (CTA). He later joined the Indian National Congress.

When Muthuramalinga Thevar resigned from the Congress and joined the All India Forward Bloc in 1939, Sasivarna Thevar followed suit. In 1951, he contested and won the Legislative Assembly elections as a Forward Bloc candidate.

In 1957, Muthuramalinga Thevar contested the Parliamentary elections as a candidate of the Forward Bloc from Aruppukottai and won. As a result of this, he resigned the Mudukulathur Legislative Assembly seat which he had previously held. Sasivarna Thevar stood for by-election from Mudukulathur and won. However, the victory triggered controversy which resulted in the murder of Congress leader Emmanuel Sekaran Devendrar and fuelled the 1957 Ramnad riots.

Sasivarna Thevar was also a part of the inter-caste peace conference organized by government for reconciliation between people of different castes. This conference was attended by Thevar, Nadar and Devendrar leaders. The death of Emmanuel Sekaran and the Ramnad riots followed soon afterwards.

Following the death of Muthuramalinga Thevar on 30 October 1963, there erupted a power struggle between Thevar's other disciple, P. K. Mookayya Thevar and Sasivarna Thevar. Mookiah Thevar emerged victorious and Sasivarna Thevar broke off to form the Subhasist Forward Bloc.

== See also ==
- Pasumpon Muthuramalinga Thevar
- 1957 Ramnad riots
- P. K. Mookayya Thevar
