= P. N. Vallarasu =

Indian politician

P. N. Vallarasu, also known as Thanagaraj, (died 21 October 2000) was an Indian politician and Member of the Legislative Assembly of Tamil Nadu.

Vallarasu contested the Andipatti assembly constituency in the 1984 elections. He has been variously described as a Dravida Munnetra Kazhagam (DMK) and Forward Bloc (FB) candidate at that time. In standing, he was facing M. G. Ramachandran, the incumbent Chief Minister and leader of the All India Anna Dravida Munnetra Kazhagam party. In a move that was considered by his opponents to be an election ploy to elicit sympathy, Ramachandran was receiving medical treatment in the US and his nomination papers to be a candidate in the election were verified by a thumbprint rather than a signature. Vallarasu took the issue to Madras High Court, claiming that the nomination was invalid because the Representation of the People Act only permitted illiterates to file their papers in such a way. The court disagreed with Vallarasu, who had also challenged the manner in which the oath had been sworn by Ramachandran. Ramachandran won the seat, with Vallarasu finishing as runner-up.

Vallarasu was elected to the Tamil Nadu legislative assembly as a DMK candidate from Usilampatti constituency in the 1989 election and as an FB candidate in the 1996 election. As an FB candidate, he also finished as runner-up in 1991.

Vallarasu died on 21 October 2000. He had been elected as state president of the FB's trade union wing in February of that year.

P. V. Kathiravan, a nephew of Vallarasu, won the Usilampatti seat in the 2011 assembly elections. Ilayarasu was founder and general secretary of all in forward bloc (vallarasu) party after death of P.N vallarasu. Ilayarasu is nephew of him. Personal life

Vallarasu was born in Nallathangalpuram (Kalpulichanpatti), Madurai, Tamil Nadu.
