= K. Velayudham Nayar =

Indian politician

K. Velayudham Nayar was an Indian politician. He was born in Kerala, but was politically active in Tamil Nadu. He belonged to the All India Forward Bloc. After the demise of the AIFB stalwart and Lok Sabha member U. Muthuramalingam Thevar, Nayar contested the Lok Sabha bye-election for Thevar's seat from the Aruppukottai constituency in 1964. His candidature was supported by the Swatantra Party, the Dravida Munnetra Kazhagam and the Indian Union Muslim League. Nayar was, however, defeated by the Congress candidate R.K. Dorai (brother of the Raja of Ramnad).

In 1968 Nayar (then a central committee member of the party), together with S. Andi Thevar broke away from AIFB and founded the Revolutionary Forward Bloc. Nayar accused the Forward Bloc of deviating from its socialist principles through its cooperation with the rightwing Swantantra Party. Nayar became the chairman of RFB. The RFB was, however, reunified with AIFB in 1979.

== Sources ==
- Bose, K.; Forward Bloc. Madras: 1988, Tamil Nadu Academy of Political Science. p. 163, 189, 193
- ECI: Bye-Election Results 1952–95
