= S. Andi Thevar =

- சி. ஆண்டித் தேவர்

Member of the Tamil Nadu Legislative Assembly
- In office 1980–1984
- Preceded by: P. K. Mookiah Thevar
- Succeeded by: P. K. M. Muthuramalingam
- Constituency: Usilampatti

Personal details
- Born: 1 June 1934 (age 92) P. Kalappanpatti, Madras Presidency, British India
- Party: All India Forward Bloc
- Education: St. Xavier's College, Palayamkottai; Madras Law College
- Profession: Lawyer

S. Andi Thevar was an Indian politician and a former member of the Tamil Nadu Legislative Assembly. He was born on June 1, 1934, in P. Kalappanpatti.

He completed his schooling in Usilampatti, pursued his collegiate education at St. Xavier's College, Palayamkottai, and obtained his law degree from the Madras Law College. A member of the All India Forward Bloc party, he was elected to the Tamil Nadu Legislative Assembly from the Usilampatti Assembly constituency in the 1980 general elections.

== Electoral Performance ==
=== 1980 ===
1980 Tamil Nadu Legislative Assembly election: Usilampatti
Party	Candidate	Votes	%	±%
AIFB	S. Andi Thevar	33,857	47.67%	New
Independent	P. K. M. Muthuramalingam	21,534	30.32%	New
DMK	L. Santhana Thevar	15,033	21.16%	+13.53
Independent	T. K. Karutha Pandian	605	0.85%	New
Margin of victory		12,323	17.35%	−24.59%
Turnout		71,029	58.73%	7.26%
Registered electors		122,773		
AIFB hold		Swing	-14.28%	
