= National Forward Bloc =

Political party in India

National Forward Bloc was a political party in Tamil Nadu, India. The party was founded in 1977 by K. Kandasamy and T.P.M. Periyasami, following a split from the All India Forward Bloc.

In 1980 NFB suffered a split, as a group led by Ayyanan Ambalam left to found the Pasumpon Forward Bloc.

In 1981, NFB and PFB merged and formed the Tamil Nadu Forward Bloc.

== General references ==
- Bose, K. (1988). Forward Bloc. Madras: Tamil Nadu Academy of Political Science. ASIN B0000D6CIA.
