= TUCC =

Most commonly, TUCC stands for:

- Trinity United Church of Christ, an African-American megachurch in Chicago

It can also stand for:

- Tasmania University Cricket Club, also known as the "Lions"
- Tasmanian University Chemistry Club
- Trade Union Coordination Committee
- Triangle Universities Computation Center, based in Research Triangle Park, NC
- Transport Users Consultative Committee
