= I. Mahendran =

Indian politician

Member of the Tamil Nadu Legislative Assembly
- In office 11 May 2006 – 13 May 2011
- Preceded by: L. Santhanam
- Succeeded by: P. V. Kathiravan
- Constituency: Usilampatti

Personal details
- Born: Mahendran; 1965 (age 60–61) Usilampatti, Madurai district, Tamil Nadu, India
- Party: AIADMK (until 2017, 2023-present)
- Other political affiliations: AMMK (2017-2023)
- Parent: Irulandi Thevar (father)

Irulandi Mahendran is an Indian politician from Tamil Nadu. He was elected to the Tamil Nadu Legislative Assembly from the Usilampatti constituency in the 2006 elections, representing the All India Anna Dravida Munnetra Kazhagam (AIADMK) party.
