= All India Youth League =

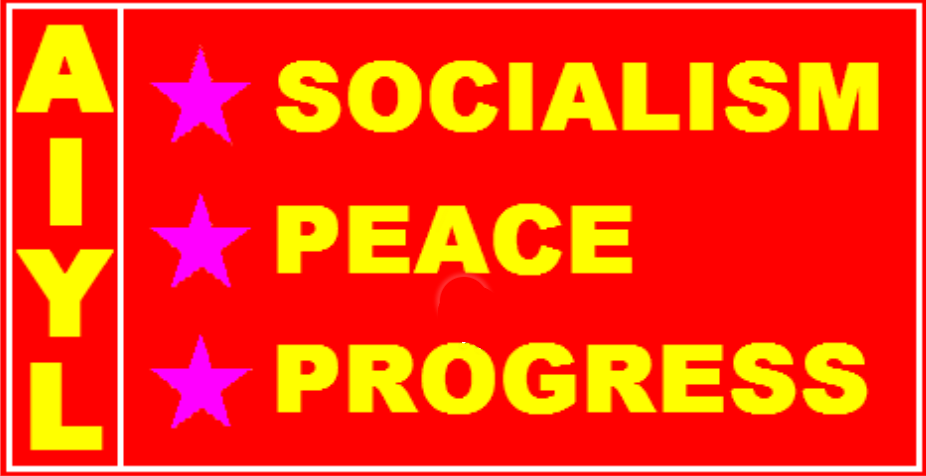
AIYL flag

All India Youth League is the youth wing of the Indian political party All India Forward Bloc.

AIYL was founded in 1928 by Subhas Chandra Bose, as the first national youth organization. By the end of 1929 the youth movement was growing, with AIYL being set up across the country.

Shri Magharam Vaidya was elected as the Prime Minister of the Forward All-India Youth League in Calcutta from 1937 to 40.

Ansar Harvani was the president of AIYL 1946-1952.

AIYL is a member of World Federation of Democratic Youth. It became a WFDY affiliate in 1951.
