= Pasumpon Forward Bloc =

Political party in Tamil Nadu, India

Pasumpon Forward Bloc was a political party in Tamil Nadu, India. The party was founded in 1980 by Ayyanan Ambalam, following a split from the National Forward Bloc (NFB). In 1981, NFB and PFB merged and formed the Tamil Nadu Forward Bloc.

The party name referred to the late Forward Bloc leader Pasumpon Muthuramalinga Thevar.

== General references ==
- Bose, K. (1988). Forward Bloc. Madras: Tamil Nadu Academy of Political Science. ASIN B0000D6CIA.
