= Tripura Bani =

Indian newspaper

Tripura Bani letter-head

Tripura Bani is a Bengali language weekly newspaper that is the mouthpiece of the Tripura State Committee of the All India Forward Bloc. The weekly is published from Agartala. As of 1983, Tripura Bani had a circulation of 1,900 copies. As of 2007 it claimed a weekly circulation of 5,895 copies.

Brajagopal Roy served as the editor of Tripura Bani until his death in July 2022.
