= P. V. Kathiravan =

Indian politician

Member of the Tamil Nadu Legislative Assembly
- In office 23 May 2011 – 21 May 2016
- Preceded by: I. Mahendran
- Succeeded by: P. Neethipathi
- Constituency: Usilampatti

Personal details
- Born: Usilampatti
- Party: All India Forward Bloc

P. V. Kathiravan is an Indian politician and former Member of the Tamil Nadu Legislative Assembly from the Usilampatti constituency. He represents the All India Forward Bloc party. He is the National deputy chairman and Tamil Nadu state general secretary of the party.

== Electoral career ==
=== Tamil Nadu Legislative Assembly Elections Contested ===
Election	Constituency	Party	Result	Vote %	Opposition Candidate	Opposition Party	Opposition vote %
2001	Usilampatti	Independent	Lost	10.86	L. Santhanam	AIFB	43.32
2011	Usilampatti	AIFB	Won	51.22	S. O. Ramasamy	DMK	42.33
2021	Usilampatti	AIFB	Lost	30.01	P. Ayyappan	AIADMK	33.53
