= Agragami Adivasi Samiti =

Agragami Adivasi Samiti ("Forward Tribal Association"; Bengali: অগ্রগামী আদিবাসী সমিতি) is an organisation for Adivasi people in West Bengal, India. The organisation is linked to the All India Forward Bloc.

== History ==
The organisation was founded at a convention in Bankura January 28–29, 2009. The Bankura convention elected Jatin Soren and Nishikanta Mehta as joint presidents and Biswanath Kisku and Rebati Bhattacharya as joint general secretaries, as leaders of a 39-member State Committee. The Bankura convention adopted a twenty-one point list of demands; that the Forest Dweller Act provisions on the right to water-forest-land be implemented, that tribal certificates be given to all Adivasi families, reservation of seat in the Development Committees in Adivasi villages, that landless Adivasi families be given government lands; providing ration cards for Adivasis, development of the Ol Chiki script, institution of a 500 rupee pension for poor handicapped persons, free medical centres, agricultural aid, drinking water, electricity and compulsory primary education in all Adivasi villages, stipends for forming cooperatives and self-help groups and development of cottage industries.

== Incidents ==
On 16 December 2010 seven activists of Agragami Adivasi Samiti were killed by the Communist Party of India (Maoist). The seven were abducted from four separate villages in Purulia District. The killed had been prominent members of the organization locally. Following the killings, the CPI (Maoist) distributed posters claiming that the seven victims had aided security services. The murders were condemned by the All India Forward Bloc and the CPI (Marxist). The All India Forward Bloc organised a 24-hour bandh in Purulia District in protest.
