= All India Forward Bloc (Ramayan Singh) =

- Founder: Ramayan Singh
- Founded: 1978
- Split from: All India Forward Bloc
- Merged into: All India Forward Bloc

All India Forward Bloc (Ramayan Singh) was a political party in India. Ramayan Singh, an All India Forward Bloc leader from Bihar, had been expelled from AIFB in 1978. In May 1979 he regrouped his followers at a meeting in Delhi and constituted a parallel AIFB. Singh's party adopted the tricolour with a tiger as their flag, identical to the flag of the Indian National Army.

In the 1982 West Bengal assembly elections, Singh's party supported the Indian National Congress. Singh's party didn't win any seats.
