= Bharatiya Forward Bloc =

Bharatiya Forward Bloc was a political party in Tamil Nadu, India. The president of the party was K.A. Murugan (alias 'Muruganji'). In difference to other Forward Bloc splinter factions, the BFB aligned with the Vishva Hindu Parishad (VHP).

The party merged with the All India Forward Bloc ahead of the 2006 legislative election.
