= P. Ayyappan =

Indian politician

Member of the Tamil Nadu Legislative Assembly
- In office 12 May 2021 – 27 February 2026
- Preceded by: P. Neethipathi
- Succeeded by: Vijay Mahalingam
- Constituency: Usilampatti

Personal details
- Born: Ayyappan; 7 April 1965 (age 61) Thirumangalam, Madurai district, Tamil nadu, India
- Other political affiliations: AIADMK (1996–2022); Independent (2022–2026)

P. Ayyappan is an Indian politician who is a former Member of Legislative Assembly of Tamil Nadu. He was elected from Usilampatti as an All India Anna Dravida Munnetra Kazhagam candidate in 2021. 2026, P. Ayyappan joined the All India Puratchi Thalaivar Makkal Munnetra Kazhagam,

== Electoral performance ==
2021 Tamil Nadu Legislative Assembly election: Usilampatti
Party	Candidate	Votes	%	±%
AIADMK	P. Ayyappan	71,255	33.53	−19.35
AIFB	P. V. Kathiravan	63,778	30.01	+27.46
AMMK	I. Mahendran	55,491	26.11	New
NTK	G. Iyndhukovilan	15,357	7.23	+6.51
Independent	K. Arumugam	1,247	0.59	New
PT	C. Thiruselvam	1,161	0.55	New
Margin of victory		7,477	3.52	−12.84
Turnout		212,513	74.60	−0.10
Rejected ballots		453	0.21	
Registered electors		284,858		
AIADMK hold		Swing	-19.35	
