= Desiya Forward Bloc =

Indian political party

The Desiya Forward Bloc (Tamil: தேசிய பார்வர்டு பிளாக்) is a political party in the India state of Tamil Nadu. Arasakumar B T is the founder president of the party, whilst S.R. Thevar is its Tamil Nadu state unit president. The party has its headquarters in Chennai.

The party fielded four candidates in the 2014 Indian general election, whom together mustered 17,474 votes.
