= Tamil Nadu Forward Bloc =

Political party in Tamil Nadu, India

Tamil Nadu Forward Bloc was a political party in Tamil Nadu, India. The party was founded in 1981 through the merger of National Forward Bloc (NFB) and Pasumpon Forward Bloc of Ayyanan Ambalam, following a split from the NFB.

In 1983, the party suffered a severe split. One section of the party rallied around P.K. Muthuramalinga Thevar and formed the Democratic Forward Bloc. Another group, led by K. Kandasamy broke away and formed the All India Forward Bloc (Kandasamy). The rump TNFB was led by Ayyanan Ambalam.
