= Trade Union Coordination Centre =

Trade union in India

TUCC
- Trade Union Coordination Centre
- Founded: 1970; 56 years ago
- Headquarters: New Delhi, India
- Location: India
- Members: 1.6 million (2013)
- Key people: Probir Banerjee, President; G.R. Shivashankar, General Secretary
- Affiliations: WFTU
- Website: tucc.forwardbloc.org

Trade Union Coordination Centre is a central trade union federation in India. TUCC is politically attached to All India Forward Bloc.

TUCC was founded in 1970. Prasanta Das Gupta was the founding general secretary of TUCC. Prior to the foundation of TUCC, the trade union leaders of the Forward Bloc had belonged to the United Trade Union Congress. TUCC is mainly based in the state of West Bengal.

As of 1980, TUCC claimed to have 272,229 members in 182 affiliated unions. The Ministry of Labour verified 65 affiliated unions with a combined membership of 123,048. As of 1995, TUCC was the smallest of the ten Central Trade Union Organisations recognised by the Indian Ministry of Labour, counting 65 affiliated unions. As of 2002, TUCC had 737,760 members, out of whom 554,207 were agricultural or rural workers. In 2011, the Ministry of Labour and Employment estimated that the TUCC had a membership of more than 1.6 million. The same number was reported by the Business Standard in 2013.

As of 2013, G.R. Shivashankar was the TUCC president and Nripendra Kumar Mahto the general secretary.

Krishi Shramik Union (Agricultural Labour Union) is affiliated to TUCC.

TUCC is affiliated to the World Federation of Trade Unions.

== See also ==
- Indian Trade Unions
