= West Bengal Forward Bloc =

Political party in India

- Abbreviation: WBFB
- Chairman: Anath Malla
- General Secretary: Subrata Kumar Dey
- Founded: 27 March 2023 (3 years ago)
- Split from: All India Forward Bloc
- Ideology: Scientific socialism
- Political position: Left-wing
- Colours: Red

Party flag
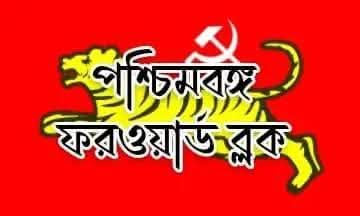

West Bengal Forward Bloc is a left-wing political party in India. It was established on 27 March 2023 as a breakway faction of All India Forward Bloc when the party removed hammer-sickle from the party flag.
