= Democratic Forward Bloc =

Political party in Tamil Nadu, India

Democratic Forward Bloc (DFB) is a political party in Tamil Nadu, India. It was formed in 1983 by P.K. Muthuramalingam as a break-away faction of the Tamil Nadu Forward Bloc. Today the general secretary of the party is S. Velusamy.

== Election results ==
In the 2001 state Legislative Assembly elections in Tamil Nadu, DFB had launched five candidates, who together got 3,270 votes.
