= P. K. Mookiah Thevar =

Indian politician (1923-1979)

P. K. Mookaiah Thevar

Member of the Madras State Assembly
- In office 1952–57
- Constituency: Periyakulam
- In office 1957-1977
- Constituency: Usilampatti

Personal details
- Born: Pappapatti Kattamuthu Ocha Thevar; 4 April 1923 Pappapatti, Usilampatti, Madurai district, Tamil Nadu
- Died: 6 September 1979 (aged 56)
- Party: All India Forward Bloc
- Occupation: Politician

P. K. Mookiah Thevar (1923–1979) was an Indian politician.

== Early life ==
He was born to Kattamuthu Ocha Thevar and Sevenamal on 4 April 1923 in Pappapatti village, near Usilampatti, Madurai district, India. He married Raniammal in 1949. He participated in many activities as a student leader. Later, he formed the Kallar educational trust and took several steps designed for the upliftment of all backward classes community in southern Tamil Nadu.He worked for the upliftment of downtrodden people and the vulnerable groups.

== Political career ==
Later, he joined Forward Bloc, an Indian National Political Party, formed by Subhas Chandra Bose, under the guidance of Pasumpon Muthuramalinga Thevar.

He was elected for the Periakulam Assembly constituency in 1952–57 as a Forward Bloc candidate. He also served as a Member of the Legislative Assembly in Usilampatti for four terms (1957–62, 1962–67, 1967–71, 1977–79). He was sworn in as Pro-tem speaker on 13th March 1967 in Guindy Raj Bhavan. He was part of the Business Advisory Committee of the Legislative Assembly in 1969, 1970, 1977.He was again sworn in as Pro-tem speaker on 1st July 1977 in Guindy, Raj Bhavan.

In 1971 he matched the achievement of U. Muthuramalinga Thevar in winning both Assembly and Parliament elections simultaneously. His parliamentary constituency was that of Ramanathapuram district and his period of office as an MP ran from 1971 to 1977. Katchatheevu formed part of the Ramanad parliamentary constituency. On July 23rd, 1974, when Statements regarding "Agreement between India and Sri Lanka on boundary in Historical Waters between the Two countries and related matters" was to be made by then Indian External Affairs Minister Sri Swaran Singh in Parliament, Mookkiah Thevar walked out opposing the Agreement. Along with him, IUML MP S.M. Muhammed Sheriff of Periyakulam Lok Sabha Constituency, who was also the MP of Ramnad before Mookaiah Thevar, also walked out.

== Electoral records ==
He was elected to the Tamil Nadu legislative assembly from Usilampatti constituency as an Independent candidate in 1957 election, and as a Forward Bloc candidate in 1962, 1967, 1971 and 1977 elections.
