= L. Santhanam =

Indian politician

L. Santhanam is an Indian politician and was a Member of the Legislative Assembly (MLA) of Tamil Nadu. He was elected to the Tamil Nadu legislative assembly as a Dravida Munnetra Kazhagam (DMK) candidate from Sholavandan constituency in the 1996 election and from the Usilampatti constituency in 2001 as a candidate of the All India Forward Bloc (AIFB). He stood again for the Sholavandan seat in the 2006, this time as a candidate for the All India Anna Dravida Munnetra Kazhagam, and lost to P. Moorthy of the DMK.

AIADMK leader Jayalalithaa allocated the Usilampatti constituency candidacy to Santhanam in the 2001 elections as part of an electoral pact with the AIFB. His 2006 candidacy for the AIADMK was a consequence of a dispute within the AIFB, a party with which he had been at odds since at least 2004 despite being its general secretary. He was the sole AIFB MLA in the 2001-2006 Assembly and he disagreed with the AIFB leadership's interest in abandoning their electoral pact with the AIADMK for the 2006 elections. Despite his attempts in the courts to prevent it, Santhanam was expelled from the AIFB by its new president, the actor-politician Karthik, and reached an individual agreement with the AIADMK to contest a seat in the election. He was initially allocated the Madurai Central constituency but this was changed as Jayalalithaa made numerous adjustments, in part as an attempt to appease local party workers in various areas across the state who had objected to her choice of seat allocations.
