= Bihar Vikas Party =

Political party in India

Bihar Vikas Party (Bihar Development Party), political party in the Indian state of Bihar. BVP was formed ahead of the Lok Sabha 1999 elections by Bharatiya Janata Party (BJP) Rajya Sabha MP, Janardan Yadav. Yadav got some local ex-BJP leaders along to his new party. Yadav got 6 591 votes (1.04%) in the constituency Godda (today part of Jharkhand).

BVP are opponents of the bifurcation of Bihar and the creation of Jharkhand as a separate state.

BVP stands on the same ideological ground as BJP, for example on the Ayodhya issue.
