= All India Forward Bloc (Subhasist) =

- Leader: Aveek Roy
- Ideology: Subhasism

All India Forward Bloc (Subhasist), an Indian political party. AIFB(S) is a splinter group of All India Forward Bloc. AIFB(S) is mainly concentrated in West Bengal, Tamil Nadu and Karnataka. The party was founded in 1963 by Sasivarna Thevar, after a power vacuum led Thevar to try to take control of the All India Forward Bloc (AIFB) party in Tamil Nadu. When he failed, he quit to launch the Subhasist Forward Bloc party, a splinter group of the AIFB. The party is mainly concentrated in the states of West Bengal, Tamil Nadu and Karnataka. The Previous general secretary of the party was Late K. Kandasamy. Now Mr. Aveek Roy is National General Secretary.

In the 2003 by-elections in Tamil Nadu, AIFB(S) supported All India Anna Dravida Munnetra Kazhagam (AIADMK).
