= Kallar (caste) =

Tamil caste belonging to the triumvirate known as Mukkulathor

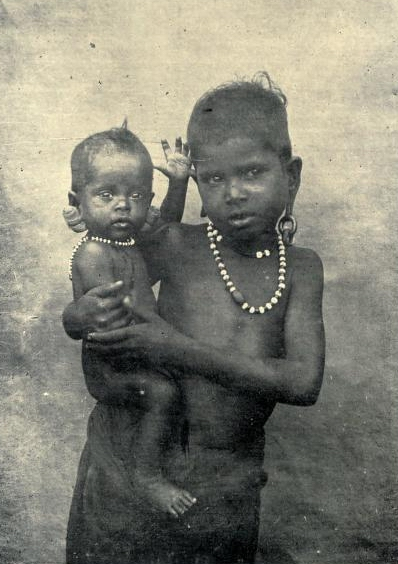
- Kallar children with dilated earlobes, formerly a common practice

Regions with significant populations
- Tamil Nadu

Languages
- Tamil

Religion
- Folk Hinduism

Kallar (or Kallan, formerly spelled as Colleries) is one of the three related castes of southern India which constitute the Mukkulathor confederacy. The Kallar, along with the Maravar and Agamudayar, constitute a united social caste on the basis of parallel professions, though their locations and heritages are wholly separate from one another.

== Etymology ==
Kallar is a Tamil word meaning thief. Their history has included periods of banditry. Kallars themselves use titles such as "landlord". Other proposed etymological origins include "black skinned", "hero", and "toddy-tappers".

The anthropologist Susan Bayly notes that the name Kallar, as with that of Maravar, was a title bestowed by Tamil palaiyakkarars (warrior-chiefs) on pastoral peasants who acted as their armed retainers. The majority of those poligars, who during the late 17th and 18th centuries controlled much of the Telugu region as well as the Tamil area, had themselves come from the Kallar, Maravar and Vatuka communities. Kallar is synonymous with the western Indian term, Koli, having connotations of thievery but also of upland pastoralism. According to Bayly, Kallar should be considered a "title of rural groups in Tamil Nadu with warrior-pastoralist ancestral traditions".

== History ==
Ramachandra Tondaiman, Raja of Pudukkottai seated in his palace, 1858

Bayly notes that the Kallar and Maravar identities as a caste, rather than as a title, "... were clearly not ancient facts of life in the Tamil Nadu region. Insofar as these people of the turbulent poligar country really did become castes, their bonds of affinity were shaped in the relatively recent past". Prior to the late 18th century, their exposure to Brahmanic Hinduism, the concept of varna and practices such as endogamy that define the Indian caste system was minimal. Thereafter, the evolution as a caste developed as a result of various influences, including increased interaction with other groups as a consequence of jungle clearances, state-building and ideological shifts.

British sources often characterized the Kallars, and the related castes, as "soldiers out of work." Many Kallars had been warriors as well as peasants for the last few centuries. Kallar chieftaincies, organized into networks of nadus, controlled the region north and west of Madurai. The Nayaks attempted to pacify or subjugate them by titling Kallar chieftains, with limited success. These nadus were well outside Nayaka control, and folk songs told of fields that could not be harvested and raids by Kallar parties, who were considered sovereign and independent, in Madurai city. This situation persisted past the downfall of the Nayakas and the advent of Yusuf Khan, until the mid-18th century. Starting in 1755, the Presidency armies of the East India Company engaged in several campaigns against the Kallars of Melur, but decades later Kallar raiding parties still posed a significant threat. In 1801, they networked with palegars of Tamil and Telugu regions to spearhead a series of revolts against British control.

By the late 18th century, the Kallars were working as kavalkarars, or watchmen, in hundreds of villages throughout southern Tamil Nadu, especially the region west of Madurai. These kavalkarars were given maniyam, rent-free land, to ensure they did their job correctly. These kaval maniyams were commonly held by palaiyakarars who used land, and shares of the crops, to maintain a small militia. A common allegation made by colonial officials was that these kavalkarars were "abusing" their position and exploiting the peasants whose livelihoods they were supposed to protect. Kallars were often also hired as mercenaries by palaiyakarars, who according to British sources, used them to loot villagers. In 1803, these rights were abolished by the East India Company and the militias were abolished. However, the kaval system was not abolished but placed under the supervision of the East India Company.

Reforms in 1816 abolished the responsibility kavalkarars had towards compensation for damaged crops while keeping fees, which British sources claimed led to the kavalkarars charging exorbitant fees. By the end of the 19th century, the watchmen formed a "shadow administration." Although British claims that Kallar watchmen were operating a "protection racket" were exaggerated, the Kallar watchmen still had the power of violence over the cultivators who paid them.

Around the beginning of the 20th century, the cultivators, of many communities, near Madurai staged an anti-Kallar movement against the community's authority. The reasons for the movement are complex: partly the abuse of authority shown by Kallar watchmen, partly agrarian distress, and part-personal feud. The agitations took the form of violence against the Kallars, including arson, and forcing them out of the villages. In 1918, the community was placed on the list of Criminal Tribes.

The Thondaiman dynasty of the erstwhile Pudukkottai state hailed from the Kallar community.

== Culture ==
Among the traditional customs of the Kallar noted by colonial officials was the use of the "collery stick" (Tamil: valai tādi, kallartādi), a bent throwing stick or "false boomerang" which could be thrown up to 100 yards (91 m). Writing in 1957, Louis Dumont noted that despite the weapon's frequent mention in literature, it had disappeared amongst the Piramalai Kallar.

=== Diet ===
The Kallar were traditionally a non-vegetarian people, though a 1970s survey of Tamil Nadu indicated that 30% of Kallar surveyed, though non-vegetarian, refrained from eating fish after puberty. Meat, though present in the Kallar diet, was not frequently eaten but restricted to Saturday nights and festival days. Even so, this small amount of meat was sufficient to affect perceptions of Kallar social status.

=== Martial arts ===
The Kallars traditionally practised a Tamil martial art variously known as Adimurai, chinna adi and varna ati. In recent years, since 1958, these have been referred to as Southern-style Kalaripayattu, although they are distinct from the ancient martial art of Kalaripayattu itself that was historically the style found in Kerala.
