= Ayyanan Ambalam =

Ayyanan Ambalam (15 July 1924 – 1998) was an Indian politician, belonging to the All India Forward Bloc.

== Biography ==
Ayyanan Ambalam was born on 15 July 1924. He attended school up to IV Form, and joined politics in 1942.

In 1965 he was elected Chairman of the Panchayat Union Council, Madurai East.

Ambalam was elected Member of the Tamil Nadu Legislative Council on 21 April 1970, representing Madurai Local Authorities.

Ambalam died in a car accident in 1998.
