= Usilampatti Assembly constituency =

One of the 234 State Legislative Assembly Constituencies in Tamil Nadu, in India

Coordinates: 9.97°N 77.8°E

Usilampatti
- Constituency No. 197 for the Tamil Nadu Legislative Assembly

Constituency details
- Country: India
- Region: South India
- State: Tamil Nadu
- District: Madurai
- Established: 1957
- Total electors: 266,192

Member of Legislative Assembly
- 17th Tamil Nadu Legislative Assembly
- Incumbent Vijay Mahalingam
- Party: TVK
- Elected year: 2026

Usilampatti is a state assembly constituency in Madurai district in Tamil Nadu. The constituency has been in existence since the 1957 election. It is one of the 234 State Legislative Assembly Constituencies in Tamil Nadu, in India. Elections and winners from this constituency are listed below.

== Members of Legislative Assembly ==
=== Madras State ===
Year	Winner	Party
1957	P. K. Mookiah Thevar	Independent
1962	P. K. Mookiah Thevar	All India Forward Bloc
1967	P. K. Mookiah Thevar	All India Forward Bloc

=== Tamil Nadu ===
Year	Winner	Party
1971	P. K. Mookiah Thevar	All India Forward Bloc
1977	P. K. Mookiah Thevar	All India Forward Bloc
1980	S. Andi Thevar	All India Forward Bloc
1984	P. K. M. Muthuramalingam	Independent
1989	P. N. Vallarasu	Dravida Munnetra Kazhagam
1991	R. Pandiammal	All India Anna Dravida Munnetra Kazhagam
1996	P. N. Vallarasu	All India Forward Bloc
2001	L. Santhanam	All India Forward Bloc
2006	I. Mahendran	All India Anna Dravida Munnetra Kazhagam
2011	P. V. Kathiravan	All India Forward Bloc
2016	P. Neethipathi	All India Anna Dravida Munnetra Kazhagam
2021	P. Iyyappan	All India Anna Dravida Munnetra Kazhagam
2026	Vijay Mahalingam	Tamilaga Vettri Kazhagam

== Election results ==
Vote share of winning candidates
2026	29.34%
2021	33.53%
2016	52.88%
2011	51.22%
2006	42.17%
2001	43.32%
1996	76.18%
1991	50.30%
1989	33.74%
1984	60.90%
1980	47.67%
1977	61.95%
1971	74.46%
1967	72.11%
1957	66.32%

=== 2026 ===
2026 Tamil Nadu Legislative Assembly election: Usilampatti
Party	Candidate	Votes	%	±%
TVK	Vijay Mahalingam	65,743	29.34	New
AIADMK	I. Mahendran	63,938	28.54	▼4.99
INC	T. Saravanakumar	59,465	26.54	New
AIPTMMK	P. Ayyappan	16,620	7.42	New
NTK	Abirami Dhanapal	15,185	6.78	▼0.45
NOTA	NOTA	692	0.31	
Margin of victory		1,805	0.80	
Turnout				
Rejected ballots				
Registered electors		264,141		
TVK gain from AIADMK		Swing		

=== 2021 ===
2021 Tamil Nadu Legislative Assembly election: Usilampatti
Party	Candidate	Votes	%	±%
AIADMK	P. Ayyappan	71,255	33.53	−19.35
AIFB	P. V. Kathiravan	63,778	30.01	+27.46
AMMK	I. Mahendran	55,491	26.11	New
Independent	K. Arumugam	1,247	0.59	New
PT	C. Thiruselvam	1,161	0.55	New
Margin of victory		7,477	3.52	−12.84
Turnout		212,513	74.60	−0.10
Rejected ballots		453	0.21	
Registered electors		284,858		
AIADMK hold		Swing	-19.35	

=== 2016 ===
2016 Tamil Nadu Legislative Assembly election: Usilampatti
Party	Candidate	Votes	%	±%
AIADMK	P. Neethipathi	106,349	52.88	New
DMK	K. Ilamakezhan	73,443	36.52	−5.81
MDMK	A. Baskara Sethupathy	7,079	3.52	New
AIFB	P. V. Kathiravan	5,136	2.55	New
BJP	M. Sangli	2,860	1.42	+0.31
NOTA	NOTA	1,672	0.83	New
Margin of victory		32,906	16.36	+7.47
Turnout		201,126	74.70	−4.61
Registered electors		269,244		
AIADMK gain from AIFB		Swing	1.65	

=== 2011 ===
2011 Tamil Nadu Legislative Assembly election: Usilampatti
Party	Candidate	Votes	%	±%
AIFB	P. V. Kathiravan	88,253	51.22	New
DMK	S. O. Ramasamy	72,933	42.33	+3.45
Independent	C. Kannan	3,354	1.95	New
BSP	K. Venkatesan	2,235	1.30	+0.73
BJP	R. Mathuran	1,919	1.11	−0.53
JMM	K. Pandi	1,558	0.90	New
Margin of victory		15,320	8.89	5.60
Turnout		172,293	79.31	12.15
Registered electors		217,244		
AIFB gain from AIADMK		Swing	9.05	

=== 2006 ===
2006 Tamil Nadu Legislative Assembly election: Usilampatti
Party	Candidate	Votes	%	±%
AIADMK	I. Mahendran	39,009	42.17	New
DMK	P. V. Kathiravan	35,964	38.88	+5.56
DMDK	A. K. T. Raja	9,672	10.46	New
MGP	K. Surendran	3,874	4.19	New
BJP	V. Panneer Selvam	1,516	1.64	New
AIFB	K. Muthiah Pasumpon	840	0.91	New
Independent	A. Thirumoorthy	658	0.71	New
BSP	M. Suryadev	526	0.57	New
Margin of victory		3,045	3.29	−6.72
Turnout		92,503	67.16	12.19
Registered electors		137,738		
AIADMK gain from AIFB		Swing	-1.15	

=== 2001 ===
2001 Tamil Nadu Legislative Assembly election: Usilampatti
Party	Candidate	Votes	%	±%
AIFB	L. Santhanam	39,248	43.32	New
DMK	S. O. Ramasamy	30,181	33.31	New
Independent	P. V. Kathiravan	9,834	10.86	New
JP	A. Murugan	7,455	8.23	New
MDMK	T. K. P. Rathinam	1,386	1.53	New
Independent	P. K. M. Rajeswari Kasinathan	1,023	1.13	New
Independent	N. Thinagaran Alias Duraisingam	705	0.78	New
Margin of victory		9,067	10.01	−46.53
Turnout		90,594	54.97	−9.07
Registered electors		164,821		
AIFB hold		Swing	-32.86	

=== 1996 ===
1996 Tamil Nadu Legislative Assembly election: Usilampatti
Party	Candidate	Votes	%	±%
AIFB	P. N. Vallarasu	75,324	76.18	New
AIADMK	P. Veluchamy	19,421	19.64	−30.65
Independent	M. Perumal	3,582	3.62	New
Margin of victory		55,903	56.54	52.68
Turnout		98,877	64.04	8.75
Registered electors		159,474		
AIFB gain from AIADMK		Swing	25.88	

=== 1991 ===
1991 Tamil Nadu Legislative Assembly election: Usilampatti
Party	Candidate	Votes	%	±%
AIADMK	R. Pandiammal	41,654	50.30	+35.11
AIFB	P. N. Vallarasu	38,460	46.44	New
BJP	R. S. Bose	638	0.77	+0.13
PMK	A. Thangavelu	606	0.73	New
Margin of victory		3,194	3.86	−11.89
Turnout		82,818	55.29	−8.09
Registered electors		155,036		
AIADMK gain from DMK		Swing	16.55	

=== 1989 ===
1989 Tamil Nadu Legislative Assembly election: Usilampatti
Party	Candidate	Votes	%	±%
DMK	P. N. Vallarasu	29,116	33.74	New
INC	V. Pandian	15,525	17.99	New
AIADMK	K. Thavasi	13,106	15.19	New
AIFB	S. Andithevar	9,090	10.53	New
Independent	P. K. M. Muthuramalingam	8,776	10.17	New
Independent	P. Ramasami	8,473	9.82	New
BJP	M. Pitchaithevar	554	0.64	New
Independent	P. Mariappan	437	0.51	New
Margin of victory		13,591	15.75	−9.08
Turnout		86,285	63.37	−6.27
Registered electors		138,949		
DMK gain from Independent		Swing	-27.16	

=== 1984 ===
1984 Tamil Nadu Legislative Assembly election: Usilampatti
Party	Candidate	Votes	%	±%
Independent	P. K. M. Muthuramalingam	50,876	60.90	New
Independent	S. Andi Thever	30,135	36.07	New
Independent	O. Gurusamy	937	1.12	New
Independent	R. Muthiah	677	0.81	New
Independent	T. K. Karuthapandian	496	0.59	New
Margin of victory		20,741	24.83	7.48
Turnout		83,541	69.64	10.91
Registered electors		125,879		
Independent gain from AIFB		Swing	13.23	

=== 1980 ===
1980 Tamil Nadu Legislative Assembly election: Usilampatti
Party	Candidate	Votes	%	±%
AIFB	S. Andi Thevar	33,857	47.67	New
Independent	P. K. M. Muthuramalingam	21,534	30.32	New
DMK	L. Santhana Thevar	15,033	21.16	+13.53
Independent	T. K. Karutha Pandian	605	0.85	New
Margin of victory		12,323	17.35	−24.59
Turnout		71,029	58.73	7.26
Registered electors		122,773		
AIFB hold		Swing	-14.28	

=== 1977 ===
1977 Tamil Nadu Legislative Assembly election: Usilampatti
Party	Candidate	Votes	%	±%
AIFB	P. K. Mookiah Thevar	35,361	61.95	New
INC	N. S. Ponniah	11,422	20.01	New
JP	K. N. A. Natarajan	5,034	8.82	New
DMK	T. K. P. Rathinam	4,356	7.63	New
Independent	R. Veerammal	911	1.60	New
Margin of victory		23,939	41.94	−6.98
Turnout		57,084	51.47	−17.55
Registered electors		111,961		
AIFB hold		Swing	-12.51	

=== 1971 ===
1971 Tamil Nadu Legislative Assembly election: Usilampatti
Party	Candidate	Votes	%	±%
AIFB	P. K. Mookiah Thevar	49,292	74.46	New
Independent	S. Andi Thevar	16,909	25.54	New
Margin of victory		32,383	48.92	2.97
Turnout		66,201	69.02	−7.67
Registered electors		99,815		
AIFB hold		Swing	2.34	

=== 1967 ===
1967 Madras Legislative Assembly election: Usilampatti
Party	Candidate	Votes	%	±%
AIFB	P. K. Mookiah Thevar	44,714	72.11	New
INC	A. M. N. Thevar	16,225	26.17	−6.65
Independent	A. Yougaraju	1,065	1.72	New
Margin of victory		28,489	45.95	11.58
Turnout		62,004	76.69	2.84
Registered electors		87,876		
AIFB hold		Swing	4.93	

=== 1962 ===
1962 Madras Legislative Assembly election: Usilampatti
Party	Candidate	Votes	%	±%
AIFB	P. K. Mookiah Thevar	47,069	67.18	New
INC	Thinagarasamy Thevar	22,992	32.82	+8.79
Margin of victory		24,077	34.37	−7.93
Turnout		70,061	73.84	18.96
Registered electors		99,021		
AIFB gain from Independent		Swing	0.86	

=== 1957 ===
1957 Madras Legislative Assembly election: Usilampatti
Party	Candidate	Votes	%	±%
Independent	P. K. Mookiah Thevar	31,631	66.32	New
INC	P. V. Raj	11,459	24.03	New
Independent	Kamana Thevar	4,606	9.66	New
Margin of victory		20,172	42.29	
Turnout		47,696	54.88	
Registered electors		86,904		
Independent win (new seat)				
