= Usilampatti =

- Town
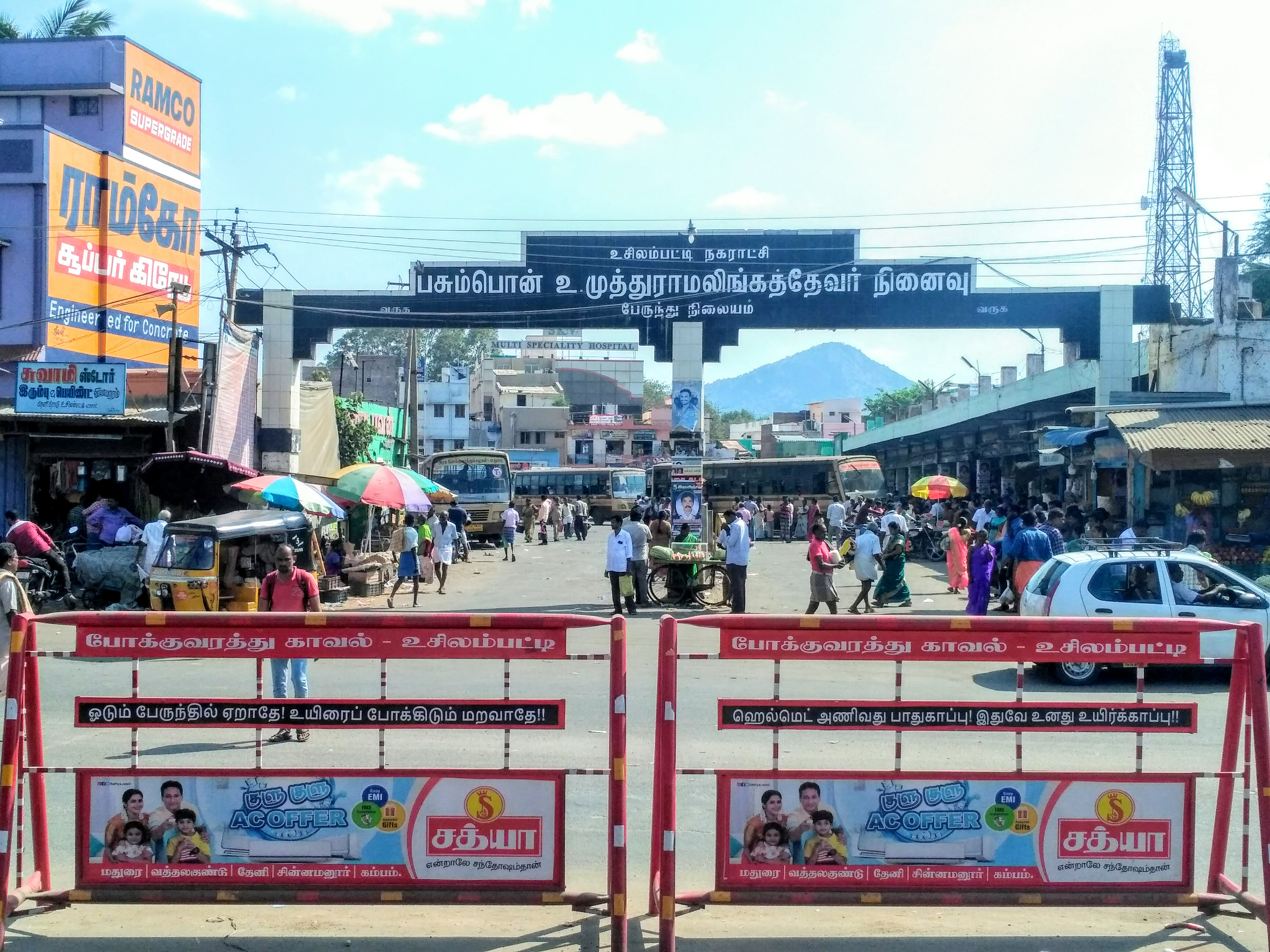
- Usilampatti bus stand
- Nickname: Usilai
- Interactive map of Usilampatti
- Coordinates: 9.9651°N 77.7885°E
- Country: India
- State: Tamil Nadu
- District: Madurai district
- Taluk: Usilampatti
- Gr III Municipality since: 1997

Government
  - Body: Municipality
  - M. L. A.: P. Ayyappan
- Elevation: 263 m (863 ft)

Population (2011)
  - Total: 35,219

Languages
  - Official: Tamil
- Time zone: UTC+5:30 (IST)
- PIN: 625532
- Vehicle registration: TN-58 yy xxxx

Usilampatti (Tamil: [உசிலம்பட்டி]) is a town and Taluk of Madurai district in the Indian state of Tamil Nadu. It lies in an area once governed by the Pandya dynasty, for whom it served as a crucial trade hub, connecting the city of Madurai with the western passes that led into modern-day Kerala.

== Location ==
Usilampatti town lies 37 km east of Theni town and 32 km west of Madurai city on the NH 49 road. The town has a population of 30601 as per the 2001 census.

Physical feature is the Madurai–Bodinayakkanur meter gauge railway line, which runs parallel to the Madurai–Usilampatti road, bifurcating the developed area of the town. The lands which lies in between railway line and Peraiyur road and Battalakundu road, are mostly of wet lands which restrict the development of the town in the southern direction. Hence, the town is likely to expand along both sides of Peraiyur roads and Madurai roads only. Madurai road has been elevated as NH 49 (Extension) (Rameswaram to Kochi) passing through this town is an important feature of the town.

Usilampatti is located at Madurai District at 9.97°N 77.8°E. It has an average elevation of 201 metres (659 feet).

== Transportation ==
The town is well connected, by the N.H.49, (Rameswaram–Kochi with Madurai city, and a Major District road with Theni, Bodinakayanur and Cumbum town. The town is also linked with Madurai city, by a Broad gauge railway line.

The Usilampattiis has 27.230 km length of roads and the municipality is maintaining a "C” grade bus stand in the heart of the town.

The Tamil Nadu state Bus transport corporation is providing 90% of transport facilities to this town. Besides the bus facilities the southern railway is providing train facilities through Usilampatti Railway station which is an old Railway station. Train facilities are available to Madurai, Theni and Bodi.

== Climate and nature ==
The maximum temperature during summer is 39 °C and during winter it is 30 °C. The minimum temperature varies from 24.5 °C to 26.0 °C. The mean humidity is 70.2%, which varies from 61.6% to 78.8%. The seasonal climate conditions are moderate and the weather is uniformly salubrious.

The town gets major rainfall during the south west monsoon period. The Annual normal rainfall varies from 300 mm to 800 mm. The average annual rainfall being received in the town is 770 mm.

The major group of soils that are found in the town are black and red varieties. The red soil constitutes 90 percent while black soil only 10 percent.

== Demographics ==
Religious census
| Religion | Percent(%) |
| Hindu | 94.53% |
| Muslim | 2.33% |
| Christian | 2.91% |
| Sikh | 0.02% |
| Other | 0.19% |
| No religion | 0.01% |

According to 2011 census, Usilampatti had a population of 35,219 with a sex-ratio of 998 females for every 1,000 males, much above the national average of 929. A total of 3,427 were under the age of six, constituting 1,800 males and 1,627 females. Scheduled Castes and Scheduled Tribes accounted for 7.94% and .01% of the population respectively. The average literacy of the town was 78.39%, compared to the national average of 72.99%. The town had a total of : 9101 households. There were a total of 13,031 workers, comprising 443 cultivators, 1,113 main agricultural labourers, 417 in house hold industries, 9,892 other workers, 1,166 marginal workers, 32 marginal cultivators, 343 marginal agricultural labourers, 76 marginal workers in household industries and 715 other marginal workers.

As per the religious census of 2011, Usilampatti had 94.53% Hindus, 2.33% Muslims, 2.91% Christians, 0.02% Sikhs, 0.19% following other religions and 0.01% following no religion or did not indicate any religious preference.

Usilampattitown has recorded with a literacy rate of 75% in the year 2001 and this has increased from 65% in the year 1991. Among the literate population nearly 52% are male literate and remaining 48% are female literate as per 2001 census. Generally, the composition of female literacy has increased from 70% (1991) to 78% (2001), which is higher than the growth of male literacy from 81% (1991) to 86% (2001).

The working population constitutes 25% of the total population and majority of them are engaged in Pickles and Biscuits i.e. 60% in Agriculture and Trade related activities. Secondary Sector is the second important activity and nearly 40% of the total workers are engaged in business and related allied activities, especially in Biscuits, Pickles Business.

Usilampatti is a taluk headquarters. The main occupation of the town is agriculture oriented.

== Politics ==
Usilampatti assembly constituency is part of Theni (Lok Sabha constituency).
