= All India Forward Bloc =

Political party in India

- Abbreviation: AIFB
- Chairman: Naren Chatterjee
- General Secretary: G. Devarajan
- Founder: Subhas Chandra Bose
- Founded: 22 June 1939 (87 years ago)
- Split from: Indian National Congress
- Headquarters: Netaji Bhavan, T-2235/2, Ashok Nagar, Faiz Road, Karol Bagh, New Delhi, India-110005
- Newspaper: Towards Socialism; Jangarjan; Lokmat
- Student wing: All India Student Bloc
- Youth wing: All India Youth League
- Women's wing: All India Agragami Mahila Samiti
- Labour wing: Trade Union Coordination Centre
- Peasant's wing: All India Agragami Kisan Sabha
- Ideology: Socialism; Marxism; Left-wing nationalism
- Political position: Left-wing
- Colours: Red
- ECI status: State party (West Bengal)
- Alliance: INDIA (All India); Left Front (West Bengal); Left Front (Tripura); UDF (Kerala)
- Seats in West Bengal Legislative Assembly: 0 / 294

Election symbol

Party flag
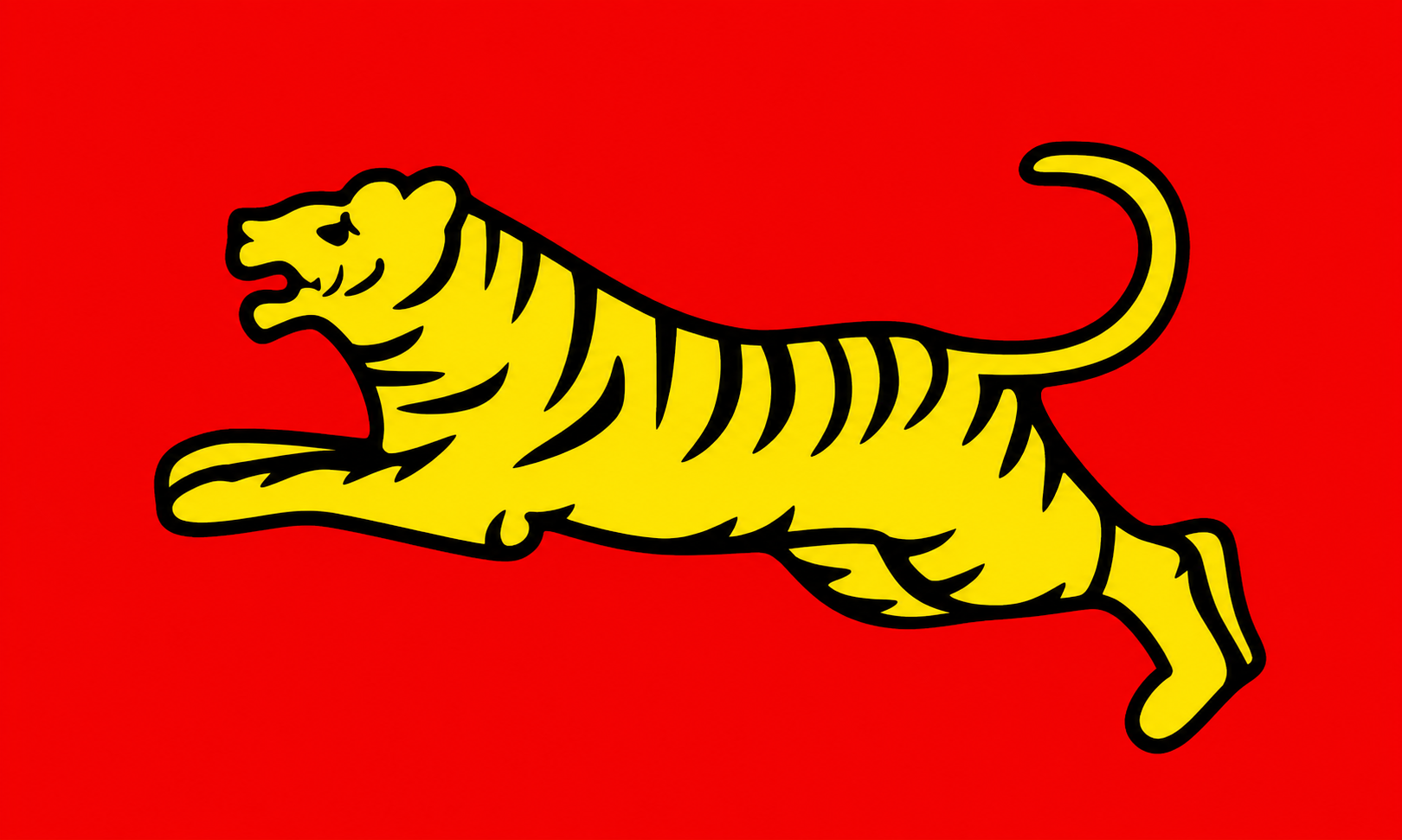

Website
- allindiaforwardbloc.org

The All India Forward Bloc (AIFB) is a left-wing nationalist political party in India. It emerged as a faction within the Indian National Congress in 1939, led by Netaji Subhas Chandra Bose, and was strongest in West Bengal. The party re-established as an independent political party after the independence of India. During the 1951–1952 and 1957 Indian general election, the party was known as Forward Bloc. The party's current Secretary-General is G. Devarajan. Veteran Indian politicians Sarat Chandra Bose (brother of Subhas Chandra Bose) and Chitta Basu had been the stalwarts of the party in independent India.

Leveraging Netaji's sway over the populace, the organization had established its electoral footprint after Independence in states like Tamil Nadu, Andhra Pradesh, Kerala, and Assam, with West Bengal as its primary bastion. However, after eight decades, the party, now confined to select regions, lacks any Members of Parliament or Legislative Assembly representatives.

== History ==
=== Formation of the Forward Bloc ===
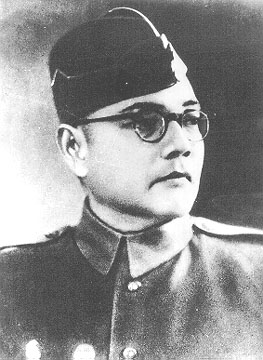
Founder, Netaji Subhas Chandra Bose

The Forward Bloc of the Indian National Congress was formed on May 3, 1939, by Netaji Subhas Chandra Bose in Makur Unnao, Uttar Pradesh, who had resigned from the presidency of the Indian National Congress on 29 April after being outmaneuvered by Mohandas Karamchand Gandhi. The formation of the Forward Bloc was announced to the public at a rally in Calcutta. Bose said that all who were joining, must never turn their back to the British and must fill the pledge form by cutting their finger and signing it with their blood. First of all, seventeen young girls came up and signed the pledge form. Initially the aim of the Forward Bloc was to rally all the leftwing sections within the Congress and develop an alternative leadership inside the Congress. Bose became the president of the Forward Bloc and S.S. Kavishar its vice-president. A Forward Bloc Conference was held in Bombay in the end of June. At that conference the constitution and programme of the Forward Bloc were approved. In July 1939 Subhas Chandra Bose announced the Committee of the Forward Bloc. It had Subhas Chandra Bose as president, S.S. Kavishar from Punjab as its vice-president, Lal Shankarlal from Delhi, as its general secretary and Vishwambhar Dayalu Tripathi and Khurshed Nariman from Bombay as secretaries. Other prominent members were Annapurniah from Andhra Pradesh, Senapati Bapat, Hari Vishnu Kamath from Bombay, Pasumpon U. Muthuramalingam Thevar from Tamil Nadu and Sheel Bhadra Yagee from Bihar. Satya Ranjan Bakshi, was appointed as the secretary of the Bengal Provincial Forward Bloc.

In August, the same year Bose began publishing a newspaper titled Forward Bloc. He travelled around the country, rallying support for his new political project.

=== The first conference ===
The next year, on 20–22 June 1940, the Forward Bloc held its first All India Conference in Nagpur. The conference declared the Forward Bloc to be a socialist political party, and the date of 22 June is considered as the founding date of the party by the Forward Bloc itself. The conference passed a resolution titled 'All Power to the Indian People', urging militant action for struggle against British colonial rule. Subhash Chandra Bose was elected as the president of the party and H.V. Kamath as the general secretary.

=== Arrest and exile of Bose ===
Soon thereafter, on 2 July 1940 Bose was arrested and detained in Presidency Jail, Calcutta. In January 1941 he escaped from house arrest, and clandestinely went into exile. He travelled to the Soviet Union via Afghanistan, seeking Soviet support for the Indian independence struggle. Soviet leader Joseph Stalin declined Bose's request, and he then travelled to Germany. In Berlin he set up the Free India Centre, and rallied the Indian Legion.

Inside India, local activists of the Forward Bloc continued the anti-British activities without central co-ordination. For example, in Bihar members were involved in the Azad Dasta resistance groups, and distributed propaganda in support of Bose and Indian National Army. They did not have, however, any organic link either with Bose nor the INA.

=== Post-war reorganisation ===
At the end of the war, the Forward Bloc was reorganised. In February 1946 R.S. Ruiker organised an All India Active Workers Conference at Jabalpur, Madhya Pradesh. The conference declared the formation of the 'FB Workers Assembly', in practice the legal cover of the still illegal Forward Bloc. Notably some leading communists from Bombay, like K.N. Joglekar and Soli Batliwalli, joined the 'FB Workers Assembly'. The Workers Assembly conference declared that the "Forward Bloc is a Socialist Party, accepting the theory of class struggle in its fullest implications and a programme of revolutionary mass action for the attainment of Socialism leading to a Classless Society."

Ahead of the 1946 assembly elections the ban on the Bloc was lifted in June that year. The Working Committee of the Forward Bloc met on 10 June.

Elections to the Constituent Assembly and to provincial legislatures were held in December 1946. The Forward Bloc contested the elections. H.V. Kamath won a seat in the Constituent Assembly and Jyotish Chandra Ghosh, Hemantha Kumar Basu and Lila Roy were elected to the Bengal Legislative Assembly.

=== Arrah conference ===
The Bloc held its 2nd All India Conference in Arrah, Bihar on 12–14 January 1947. S.S. Kavishar (a leading member of the Subhasist sector) was elected president and Sheel Bhadra Yagee (a leading member of the Marxist sector) was elected general secretary.

=== Split between Yagee and Ruikar ===
Following Independence and Partition, the party national council met in Varanasi February 1948. The national council meeting was also preceded by a decision of the Indian National Congress in the beginning of the year to expel all dissenting tendencies within the Congress, including the Forward Bloc. Thus the party decided to renounce any links with the Congress once and for all, and reconstruct itself as an independent opposition party. Moreover, it passed a resolution that the party be divided into a Forward Bloc for India and a Forward Bloc for the new nation of Pakistan. This would soon prove to be very controversial. The general secretary Yagee did, in line with the Varanasi resolution, dissolve the Bengal committee of the Forward Bloc and set-up ad hoc committees for West Bengal and East Bengal. Now the division between 'Marxists' and 'Subhasists' resurfaced. The 'Subhasists', and S. S. Kavishar in particular, criticised Yagee's actions.

The split was now a fact. The 'Subhasist' group, led by Ruiker and Cavesheer, called for a conference in Chandannagar, West Bengal. Their conference was held on 29–31 December. On the same dates Yagee organised a conference in Calcutta. Effectively there was now two Forward Blocs, the Forward Bloc led by Ruiker and the Forward Bloc led by Yagee. Yagee was elected general secretary and K.N. Joglekar, chairman of the Yagee-led group.

Roughly speaking the Yagee's party had its main base in Bihar, Punjab and West Bengal, whereas the Ruiker-led group had its strongholds in Madhya Pradesh and West Bengal.

In Tripura, a united front was formed by the Communist Party of India, Tripura Ganatantrik Sangha, Ganamukti Parishad, Ganatantrik Nari Samiti and independents to contest the election to the Tripura electoral college (whose function was to appoint a Rajya Sabha delegate from Tripura) jointly. The Forward Bloc participated in mass rallies on 2 October and 2 December 1951. However, just before the election the Forward Bloc withdrew from the front and decided to contest three of the 30 seats on their own. None of the Forward Bloc candidates were elected.

The 5th party conference (a 4th party plenum had been held in Ingota, U.P. in 1949) was held in Puri, Odisha on 28–31 December 1952. Mohan Singh was elected chairman and Dhillon as general secretary.

=== Expulsion of Yagee and Singh ===
In 1955, the Indian National Congress adopted socialism as its policy. Thus, leaders like Yagee and Singh then proposed that, as the Congress had become a socialist party, the Forward Bloc ought to merge with it. Singh and Yagee, without consulting the Central Committee nor the party membership, declared the unification of the Forward Bloc into the Congress. Many sections of the party disagreed with this move, and a Central Committee meeting was held in Nagpur 11–15 May. The Central Committee decided to expel Singh and Yagee. Hemanta Kumar Bose was elected as the new chairman and R.K. Haldulkar as general secretary.

=== Socialist unity ===
In 1964, a unity process was initiated by the Praja Socialist Party, which eventually resulted in the formation of the Samyukta Socialist Party. The Forward Bloc was invited to join the new party, and the Delhi unit of the party did take part in a joint socialist anti-Nehru campaign conference in April 1964.

=== Death of U.M. Thevar ===
The party stalwart in Tamil Nadu, U. Muthuramalingam Thevar, died on 30 October 1963. Following his death a power-struggle began between two of his disciples, Sasivarna Thevar and P.K. Mookiah Thevar. Mookiah Thevar emerged victorious and Sasivarna Thevar left to form his own party, the Subhasist Forward Bloc.

A by-election for the Aruppukottai Lok Sabha constituency seat vacated by U. Muthuramalingam Thevar's death was held in 1964, in which the Forward Bloc was defeated for the first time.

=== Progressive Front in Tripura ===
In 1965, the party joined a 'Progressive Front' in Tripura. The front consisted of the Communist Party of India, the Forward Bloc and a break-away faction of the Socialist Party. The front demanded nationwide land reforms, strengthening of the national defence, withdrawal from the Commonwealth, nationalisation of foreign capital, a rational food policy, release of all political prisoners and scrapping of the Indo-American agreement of food supply. Existence of the new front was declared at a meeting in Agartala on 17 November. Mass rallies of the front were held in Belonia on 28 November and then in Birchandra Bazar (near Belonia) on 1 December. The front did not last, though, as in the 1967 election the communist parties aligned with a splinter group of the Congress Party. The Forward Bloc did not present any candidates in that election.

=== 1968 split in Tamil Nadu ===
In 1968, two influential party leaders in Tamil Nadu Velayudham Nayar (then a central committee member of the party) and S. Andi Thevar broke away from AIFB and founded the Revolutionary Forward Bloc. Nayar and Thevar accused the Forward Bloc of having deviated from its socialist principles through its co-operation with the rightwing Swatantra Party.

=== West Dinajpur clashes ===
In July 1969, violent clashes erupted in West Dinajpur district, West Bengal, between peasants aligned with the Communist Party of India (Marxist) and East Pakistani refugee cultivators, who supported the Forward Bloc. CPI(M) leader Hare Krishna Konar characterised the events as a degeneration of the agrarian struggles in rural West Bengal.

=== Split in the Indian National Congress ===
In 1969, a major split occurred in the Indian National Congress. Indira Gandhi had entered into open conflict with the traditional Congress leadership. Effectively two separate Congress parties appeared, the Congress(R) led by Indira and the Congress(O) led by Kamaraj. The split was in many ways a left-right one, with Indira whipping up populism against the established party elites. The Forward Bloc did in some ways welcome the new developments. It appreciated Indira's stands and reformulated its anti-Congress line to focus mainly opposition to the traditional Congress elite (i.e., the Congress(O)). In the 1969 presidential elections, AIFB supported Indira's candidate V.V. Giri. This caused an abrupt break-up of the Swatantra-AIFB alliance in Tamil Nadu, as the Swatantra Party sought to align itself with the Congress(O).

=== 1971–72 elections ===
On 20 February, just ahead of the 1971 general elections, the All India Forward Bloc chairman Hemantha Kumar Bose was murdered in Calcutta. An emergency central committee meeting was held on 24 February, which appointed P.K. Mookiah Thevar as the new chairman of the party.

In the 1971 Lok Sabha election, the Forward Bloc launched 24 candidates around the country. Two were elected, P.K. Mookiah Thevar from Ramanathapuram and Jambuwantrao Dhote from Nagpur. The party contested three seats in the interior of Maharashtra, where it performed well. Dhote, who was then known as Vidarbha ka Sher (the Lion of Vidarbha), had joined the Forward Bloc and campaigned for a separate Vidarbha state with the Forward Bloc as his platform. Dhote was hugely popular in the region at the time, and could draw crowds of hundreds of thousands to his meetings.

In Tamil Nadu, the party contested one seat, Ramanathapuram, with the support of its allies in the Progressive Front (most notably the Congress(R) and Dravida Munnetra Kazhagam). Meanwhile, the Forward Bloc played an important role in securing Mukkulathor votes for its Progressive Front allies.

In West Bengal, the party contested 10 Lok Sabha seats. The party obtained some significant voting in constituencies like Cooch Behar (22.17%) and Birbhum (19.70%), but in general it was defeated by the CPI(M) candidates.

Moreover, the party contested three seats in Bihar, one in Haryana, one in Madhya Pradesh, four in Uttar Pradesh and one in Delhi. In total, the candidates of the party obtained 962,971 votes (0.66% of the national vote).

In the 1971 state legislative assembly election in Odisha, the party contested four seats. It got 8393 votes (0.19% of the statewide vote), but was not close to winning any seat. In Tamil Nadu, the party contested nine seats in the southern part of the state within the framework of the Progressive Front. Out of these nine candidates, seven won. In total, its vote stood at 268,721 (1.71% of the statewide vote). One of its candidates came second and in the Mudukulathur constituency (that had been the centre of the violent 1957 Ramnad riots) the AIFB candidate R. Rathina Thevar came third with 17244 votes (31.02%). The most spectacular victory was that of P.K. Mookiah Thevar (who contested Lok Sabha and assembly elections simultaneously) who got 49292 votes (74.46%) in the Usilampatti constituency, defeating S. Andi Thevar of the Revolutionary Forward Bloc. Lastly in West Bengal the party contested 52 constituencies, but could only win three seats. Its vote stood at 374 141 (2.90% of the statewide vote).

On 28 March 1972, the party was able to win a seat in the Tamil Nadu Legislative Council (the upper house of the state assembly) for the first time. R. Sakthi Mohan was elected with the votes of the AIFB, DMK, PSP, Muslim League and the Tamil Arasu Kazhagam.

In the 1972 state legislative assembly election, the Forward Bloc presented one candidate in Assam, five in Bihar and two in Madhya Pradesh. In Maharashtra, the party contested 26 seats. Like in the 1971 Lok Sabha elections, the party did well in the interior areas of the state. It won the Nagpur North and Yeotmal seats, and came second in several others. In total, the AIFB candidates in Maharashtra got 363 547 votes (2.4% of the statewide vote). In West Bengal, where fresh elections to the state assembly were again held in 1972, the Forward Bloc launched 18 candidates. It got 331 244 votes (2.48% of the statewide vote), but could not win a single seat.

=== Realignment in Tripura ===
After having contested the 1972 elections on its own, the Forward Bloc decided to join a 'United Front' led by the communist parties in Tripura. The front demanded clear-cut policies for procurement and distribution of food grains, stopping spiralling prices of essential commodities, a land reform legislation for delimitation of Tribal reserve areas and creation of employment opportunities for the unemployed. A 24-hour Tripura Bandh was organised by the front on 16 December. On 3 May 1974 the four parties organised a 12-hour Tripura Bandh.

=== 1977 elections ===
Nineteen seventy seven was a crucial year in Indian political history. For the first time in independent India, the Congress Party was routed in a national election. The Forward Bloc had contested four seats in the Lok Sabha election. In West Bengal, it had three candidates which were supported by the Left Front, out of whom all three were elected. Moreover, the party contested one seat in Haryana.

In Tripura, a Left Front was formed consisting of the CPI(M), RSP and the Forward Bloc. The Front launched one Forward Bloc candidate, Brajagopal Roy in the Town Bordowali constituency. Roy won the seat with 7m800 votes (62.76%). In the beginning of 1978, the Left Front formed a majority government in the state, with Brajagopal Roy appointed minister in the state government.

=== Recent history ===
Flag of the Forward Bloc, with hammer and sickle in it, used till 2023.

Ahead of the 2000 Bihar legislative election, AIFB took part in building a front together with the Bharatiya Jan Congress, the Bihar Vikas Party, the Janata Dal (Secular), the Samajwadi Janata Party and the Nationalist Congress Party. The front vowed to maintain equidistance towards the two major blocs in Bihari politics, the Rashtriya Janata Dal and the National Democratic Alliance, condemning them as 'casteist and communal'.

In 2002, AIFB was one of four left-wing parties that nominated Lakshmi Sahgal as a candidate for the presidency of India. Sehgal, who challenged the main candidate A.P.J. Abdul Kalam, got around 10% of the votes.

In the 2004 Lok Sabha elections, the party received 0.4% of votes and three seats.

Just before the 2006 Tamil Nadu legislative election, the party was joined by the actor Karthik. Karthik was given the post of president of the Tamil Nadu state unit by the national party leadership and was put in charge of the election campaign of the party in the state. The party decided to contest a large number of seats without joining either of the two major political blocs in Tamil Nadu. The appointment of Karthik as the new leader of the state unit provoked the sole Forward Bloc legislator and secretary of the state unit, L. Santhanam, to leave the party. In the election the party lost its representation in the assembly. A few months later, the party leadership expelled Karthik on the grounds of 'anti-party activities'.

Ahead of the 2006 West Bengal legislative election, a section of the party led by Jayanta Roy, former AIFB Rajya Sabha member, and Chhaya Ghosh, former West Bengal Minister of Agriculture, broke away and formed the Indian People's Forward Bloc. This party aligned itself with the Indian National Congress. The Bharatiya Forward Bloc, a former Forward Bloc splinter group, merged into the All India Forward Bloc prior to the 2006 election.

== List of General secretaries and Presidents ==
=== President ===
1. Subhas Chandra Bose (1940)
2. Sardul Singh Kavishar (1947)
3. Mohan Singh (1952)
4. Hemanta Kr. Basu (1958)
5. P. K. Mookiah Thevar (1979)
6. P. D. Paliwal (1984)
7. A. R. Perumal (1991)
8. Ayyanan Ambalam (1998)
9. D. D. Shastri (2001)

=== General Secretary ===
1. Hari Vishnu Kamath (1940)
2. Sheel Bhadra Yajee (1947)
3. Ramchandra Sakharam Ruikar (1948)
4. K. N. Joglekar (1948)
5. Gurbaksh Singh Dhillon (1952)
6. R. K. Haldulkar (1958)
7. Chitta Basu (1979)
8. Debabrata Biswas (1997)
9. G. Devarajan (2023)

=== Chairman ===
1. N. Velappan Nair
2. Naren Chatterjee

=== Vice president ===
- U. Muthuramalingam Thevar (1955)

== Eastern India ==
=== West Bengal ===
AIFB has branches throughout the country, but the main strength of the party is concentrated in West Bengal. Notably though AIFB is a part of Left Front in West Bengal, Tripura and on the national level, AIFB is not a part of the Left Democratic Front in Kerala.

=== Tripura ===
The Forward Bloc established its presence in Tripura in 1944, founded by Kamala Ranjan Talapatra. Bengali immigrants like Sailesh Sen, Gopi Ballav Saha, Dwijen Deu, Anil Dasgupta, Hiren Nandi and Sati Bhardwaz are the other active members of the party. They took part in various political campaigns. However, around 1955–1956 most of the founding core of the party in Tripura joined the RSP. Today, AIFB is a member of opposition Left Front coalition. In the 2003 Tripura legislative election the Tripura State Committee president Brajagopal Roy contested the Town Borowali constituency on behalf of the Left Front. Roy got 9844 votes (43.57%), but was defeated by a Congress candidate. The AIFB state unit publishes Tripura Bani.

== Northern India ==
=== Uttar Pradesh ===
In the 2007 assembly election, 2007 in Uttar Pradesh AIFB launched three candidates, Ram Lakhan in Bisalpur (732 votes, 0.51% of the votes in the constituency), Samar Singh in Fatehpur Sikri (870 votes, 0.69%) and Jabar Singh in Hastinapur (503 votes, 0.42%).

=== Haryana ===
AIFB has a small state unit in Haryana. The chairman of Haryana state committee is Naveen Kumar. In the 2005 election to the Haryana legislative assembly AIFB ran a single candidate, Mukhtiar Singh Kaushik in the Nilokheri constituency. Kaushik got 442 votes (0.44%).

== Southern India ==
In Andhra Pradesh the party had significant presence during the 1950s, but then declined sharply. In 2005 the party took an initiative to revive its Andhra Pradesh State Committee.

In Telangana 2018 Assembly AIFB performed very well in some Constituencies. In Ramagundam Assembly constituency AIFB candidate Korukanti Chander won with almost 32,000 huge majority. In Bhupalapally AIFB candidate Gandra Satyanarayana Rao stood 2nd place with almost 52,000 votes.

In 2024 Lok sabha elections, AIFB joined DMK-led Alliance in Tamil Nadu.

== Mass organisations ==
- All India Youth League (youths organisation)
- All India Students Bloc (student's organisation)
- Trade Union Coordination Centre (trade union organisation)
- All India Agragami Kisan Sabha (peasants' organisation)
- All India Agragami Mahila Samiti (women's organisation)
- Indian National Cyber Army (social media organisation)
- Agragami Adivasi Samiti (tribal's organization)
- Azad Hind Vahini
- Lok Sanskrity Sansad
- All India Lawyers Federation

== Splits ==
- Marxist Forward Bloc
- West Bengal Forward Bloc
- All India Forward Bloc (S)

== See also ==
- List of political parties in India
